= Savannah River Parkway =

Highway in Georgia, United States

Route information
- Length: 156.00 mi (251.06 km)
- Component highways: US 25 / US 301 / SR 73 from near Statesboro to Statesboro; US 25 Byp. / SR 67 Byp. from Statesboro to northwest of Statesboro US 25 from northwest of Statesboro to south of Waynesboro and from north of Waynesboro to Augusta: US 80 / SR 26 from northwest of Statesboro to Hopeulikit; SR 67 from northwest of Statesboro to Millen SR 121 from south of Millen to south of Waynesboro and from north of Waynesboro to Augusta SR 23 from south of Millen to Millen SR 17 Byp. in Millen US 25 Byp. / SR 121 Byp. in Waynesboro SR 21 from Savannah to Millen SR 30 in Port Wentworth US 301 / SR 73 from southwest of Sylvania to Sylvania SR 73 Loop in Sylvania

Western section
- South end: I-16 / US 25 / US 301 / SR 73 south-southwest of Statesboro
- North end: US 25 / SR 21 / SR 121 north of Millen

Eastern section
- South end: Downtown Savannah
- Major intersections: I-95 in Port Wentworth; I-520 in Augusta
- North end: US 1 / US 25 / US 78 / US 278 / SR 10 / SR 121 in Augusta

Location
- Country: United States
- State: Georgia
- Counties: Bulloch, Burke, Richmond, Chatham, Effingham, Screven, Jenkins

Highway system
- Georgia State Highway System; Interstate; US; State; Special

The Savannah River Parkway is a four-lane divided highway that roughly parallels the Savannah River in the U.S. state of Georgia, that exists in two distinct segments. The roadway is being considered for inclusion as part of Interstate 3 (I-3), which ultimately is planned to travel from Savannah to Knoxville, Tennessee.

== Route description ==
=== Western branch ===
The western branch follows US 25/US 301/SR 73 from I-16 south-southwest of Statesboro into the southern parts of the city. It then follows US 25 Byp./SR 67 Byp. around the western edge of the city, then US 25/US 80/SR 26/SR 67 northwest to Hopeulikit, where US 80/SR 26 leave the roadway. The highway travels to the north-northwest to Millen, picking up SR 121 and SR 23 along the way.

=== Eastern branch ===
The eastern branch begins at an as-yet undetermined point in downtown Savannah. It follows SR 21 out of the city. It has an interchange with I-95 in Port Wentworth and follows SR 21 northwest to Millen.

=== Combined segment ===
In Millen, both branches merge and follow US 25/SR 121 northward to an interchange with I-520 in Augusta. They continue on to the point where US 25/SR 121 begin a concurrency with US 1/US 78/US 278/SR 10 (Gordon Highway).

== Future ==
The Savannah River Parkway is proposed to be included in the future I-3, which has been planned to connect the Savannah and Knoxville metropolitan areas.

== See also ==
- Interstate 14
- Fall Line Freeway
