= U.S. Route 25 in Georgia =

Highway in Georgia, United States

U.S. Highway 25
- US 25 highlighted in red

Route information
- Maintained by GDOT
- Length: 188.94 mi (304.07 km)
- Existed: 1929-1932–present

Major junctions
- South end: US 17 / SR 25 / SR 25 Conn. in Brunswick
- US 341 / SR 25 Conn. / SR 27 in Brunswick; I-95 in Dock Junction; US 341 / SR 27 / US 301 / SR 23 in Jesup; I-16 south-southwest of Statesboro; US 25 Byp. / SR 67 Byp. / US 301 Byp. / SR 73 Byp. in Statesboro; US 80 / SR 26 / US 301 / SR 73 in Statesboro; I-520 / US 1 / US 78 / US 278 / SR 10 in Augusta
- North end: US 1 / US 25 / US 78 / US 278 / SC 121 / SR 10 at the Georgia–South Carolina state line on the northeast edge of Augusta

Location
- Country: United States
- State: Georgia
- Counties: Glynn, Wayne, Long, Tattnall, Evans, Bulloch, Jenkins, Burke, Richmond

Highway system
- United States Numbered Highway System; List; Special; Divided; Georgia State Highway System; Interstate; US; State; Special
← SR 24	→ SR 25

U.S. Highway 25 (US 25) is a United States Numbered Highway that travels from Brunswick, Georgia, to the Kentucky–Ohio state line, where Covington, Kentucky, meets Cincinnati, Ohio, at the Ohio River. In the U.S. state of Georgia, US 25 is as a 188.94-mile-long (304.07 km) highway that travels south to north in the eastern part of the state, near the Atlantic Ocean, serving Statesboro and the Brunswick and Augusta metropolitan areas on its path from Brunswick to South Carolina at the Savannah River. Its routing travels through portions of Glynn, Wayne, Long, Tattnall, Evans, Bulloch, Jenkins, Burke, and Richmond counties.

The segment of US 25 from Interstate 16 (I-16) south-southwest of Statesboro north to Millen is the western segment of the Savannah River Parkway, a four-lane divided highway that roughly parallels the Savannah River. The segment from Millen north to I-520 in Augusta is the combined segment of the parkway. This highway is being considered for inclusion as part of I-3, which is ultimately planned to stretch from Savannah to Knoxville, Tennessee.

== Route description ==
=== Glynn County ===
US 25 begins at an intersection with US 17/State Route 25 (SR 25; Glynn Avenue) in the southern part of Brunswick in Glynn County. This intersection also marks the southern end of SR 25 Connector (SR 25 Conn.). This intersection is west of the Marshes of Glynn Overlook Park and is north of Howard Coffin Park. US 25 and SR 25 Conn. travel concurrently on Gloucester Street to the west. At the intersection with US 341/SR 27 (Oglethorpe Street), SR 25 Conn. ends, and US 25 begins a nearly 39-mile-long (63 km) concurrency with US 341/SR 27. The three highways travel to the north. Just after F Street, they curve to the northeast and skirt along the western edge of Gateway Park. On the northern edge of the park, they intersect Newcastle Street and turn left, back to the north. Between L and M streets, the concurrency passes just to the southwest of Orange Park, and, between Q and R streets, they pass to the southwest of Palmetto Park. Between the intersection with Oak Street/1st Street, US 25/US 341/SR 27 pass Greenwood Cemetery. Between 2nd and 5th streets, they pass Selden Park. Between 4th and 7th streets, they pass Palmetto Cemetery. At 7th Street, they enter Dock Junction. Just before 9th Street, the concurrency passes Acco Park. Farther north, they intersect SR 303 (Blythe Island Highway/Community Road). The roadway passes to the southwest of Ballard Park and cross over the Brunswick–Altamaha Canal. Immediately, US 25/US 341/SR 27 begin to curve to the northwest. Approximately 0.5 miles (0.80 km) later, they cross over Yellow Bluff Creek. Only about 1,500 feet (460 m) later, they have an interchange with I-95 (Purple Heart Trail). At Crispen Boulevard, the concurrency leaves the city limits of Dock Junction. They cross over Burnett Creek and travel through Pyles Marsh, before curving back to the north. Immediately after that curve, the three highways travel through Brobston. Just before entering Sterling, they pass east of Sterling Park. In town, they intersect SR 99, as well SR 32. The highways travel through Pennick and Zuta, before passing to the southeast of Berry Lake. After traveling through Everett, they enter Wayne County.

=== Wayne County ===
When the concurrent routes pass Mt. Pleasant Cemetery, they curve back to the northwest, travel through Mount Pleasant and cross over Alex Creek. After traveling through Grangerville, Pendarvis, and Gardi, they make a slight westward jog in Odessa; then, they cross over Ponholloway Creek, before entering Jesup. In town, US 25 splits off from US 341/SR 27 (East Cherry Street) to the north and intersects US 301/SR 23, with which US 25 begins traveling concurrently. The three highways travel north in the northeast part of the city. They curve to the northwest, before curving back north and meeting US 84/SR 38, which join the concurrency. Immediately afterward, the five highways travel to the north and leave the city limits. The concurrency travels through rural parts of the county, before traveling through Doctortown, curving to the northeast, and crossing over the Altamaha River into Long County on the Dr. J. Alvin Leaphart Sr. Memorial Bridge.

=== Long County ===
US 25/US 84/US 301/SR 23/SR 38 continues north and travel through rural areas of the county, crossing over Forrest Pond, Back Swamp (in two places), Corker Branch, Fountain Branch, Brickyard Branch, and Jones Creek on its way to Ludowici. In town, the concurrency intersects SR 57 south, which travels to the southeast. At this intersection, US 25/US 301/SR 23, as well as SR 57 north, travel to the northwest, while US 84/SR 38 continue to the northeast. After a slight jog to the east, the roadway crosses through Wefanie. Just before leaving the county, they intersect former SR 261, today known as Marcus Nobles Road. Right after that, they curve to the north and cross over Beards Creek into Tattnall County.

=== Tattnall County ===
US 25/US 301/SR 23/SR 57 travel to the east of Kicklighters Pond. After an intersection with SR 196, the roadway curves north and enters Glennville. At an intersection with SR 144 (Barnard Street), SR 23/SR 57 depart the concurrency to the northwest. At this intersection, US 25/US 301 continue to the north, concurrent with SR 73, which begins here. Just after leaving the city limits, the highways pass the Georgia Veterans Memorial Cemetery – Glennville, Stricklands Pond, and Strickland Pond Dam. Alongside Smith State Prison, the concurrency begins to curve to the north. They curve back to the northeast and cross over Beards Creek just before intersecting what used to be SR 250. After passing to the east of Durrence Pond, just west of Midway, US 25/US 301/SR 73 cross into Evans County.

=== Evans County ===
The concurrency passes Union Cemetery and Evans Heights Golf Club. Approximately 2,000 feet (610 m) later, it crosses over Bull Creek. After a westward jog past Richards Pond, the highways curve to a due north routing and enter Claxton. In downtown, they intersect US 280/SR 30 (Main Street). Just before leaving town, the highways curve to the northeast. Just northeast of the city limits, US 25/US 301/SR 73 pass the Claxton Sewage Treatment Pond and Sewage Treatment Pond Dam. About 2,000 feet (610 m) later, they cross over the Canoochee River on the Claxton Bridge. They provide access to Claxton–Evans County Airport and then curve to the north. After curving back to the northeast, the highways curve north and intersect SR 169. About one mile (1.6 km) later, they cross into Bulloch County.

=== Bulloch County ===
Almost immediately, the three highways curve to the north-northwest, passing Ephesus Cemetery, and curve back to the north-northeast and pass by Nevils Pond and Nevils Pond Dam. They again curve to the north-northwest and have an interchange with I-16 (Jim Gillis Historic Savannah Parkway). US 25/US 301/SR 73 curve to a nearly due north routing briefly before curving to the northeast and intersect SR 46, southeast of Register, just before crossing over Lotts Creek. The highways pass Riggs Lake and Riggs Lake Dam. Later on, they travel through Jimps, just before passing a campus of Ogeechee Technical College. They intersect the southern terminus of US 25 Bypass (US 25 Byp.)/SR 67 Byp. and US 301 Byp./SR 73 Byp. (Veterans Memorial Parkway) and enter Statesboro. They pass just to the west of Georgia Southern University and skirt along the eastern edge of W. Jones Lane Memorial Park. They curve to the north-northeast and cross over Little Lotts Creek before intersecting SR 67 (Fair Road). In downtown, they curve to the north-northwest and intersect US 80/SR 26 (Northside Drive East). At this intersection, US 301/SR 73 continue to the north-northwest, while US 25/SR 67 travel to the west-southwest, concurrent with US 80/SR 26. The four highway curve to the north-northwest before assuming a more northwesterly routing. After leaving the city limits, they intersect the northern terminus of US 25 Byp./SR 67 Byp. They provide access to William James Middle School. In Hopeulikit, the four highways curve to the north-northwest; then, US 80/SR 26 split off to the southwest. About five miles (8.0 km) later, US 25/SR 67 enter Jenkins County.

=== Jenkins County ===
After continuing north, US 25/SR 67 pass Paynes Chapel Cemetery and Clifton Cemetery, before they curve northeast. They intersect SR 121, which joins the concurrency. Approximately two miles (3.2 km) later, immediately after traveling through Emmalane, they intersect SR 23, which also joins the concurrency. At Union Camp Logging Road, the four highways curve to the northeast and cross over the Ogeechee River. Just after entering Millen, they curve north and intersect SR 17 Byp. (South Gray Street), which joins the concurrency. At an intersection with SR 17 (Winthrope Avenue), SR 17 Byp. ends, and SR 23/SR 67 depart the concurrency to the east. Less than 1,000 feet (300 m) before leaving town, US 25/SR 121 curve to the northwest. On the northern edge of the city limits, they intersect the SR 21. The two highways pass the Magnolia Springs Country Club and travel through the southwestern part of Magnolia Springs State Park, in the community of Lawton. On the northwestern edge of the park, they pass Millen Airport and curve back north, passing Magnolia View Lake and Perkins; they curve once again to the north and enter Burke County.

=== Burke County ===
The concurrency travels west of Munnerlyn, passing Jenkins Lake, makes a slight westward jog, and curves due north before curving back to the northwest in Idlewood and passing Burke County Airport. They intersect US 25 Byp./SR 121 Byp. (Burke Veterans Parkway). The mainline highways turn to the right and curve back to the north and have an interchange with the bypass route. Just before entering Waynesboro the roadway passes west of the Burke County campus of Augusta Technical College. In town, they curve to the north and intersect SR 24, which joins the concurrency. The three highways travel to the northwest and pass Burke Medical Center and the Burke County Museum. They intersect SR 56/SR 80 (6th Street). At this intersection, SR 24 departs the concurrency to the southwest. Just past 9th Street, they pass Burkeland Garden. About 300 feet (91 m) past the West 13th Street/Peachtree Street intersection, the concurrency begins to curve to the north to an intersection with US 25 Byp./SR 121 Byp. The mainline highways turn left and begin curving to the northwest and leave town; then, they curve north. They cross over Walnut Branch and Brier Creek, before traveling to the west of Stockton Pond. Approximately four miles (6.4 km) later, the highways cross over McBean Creek into Richmond County and the city limits of Augusta.

=== Richmond County ===
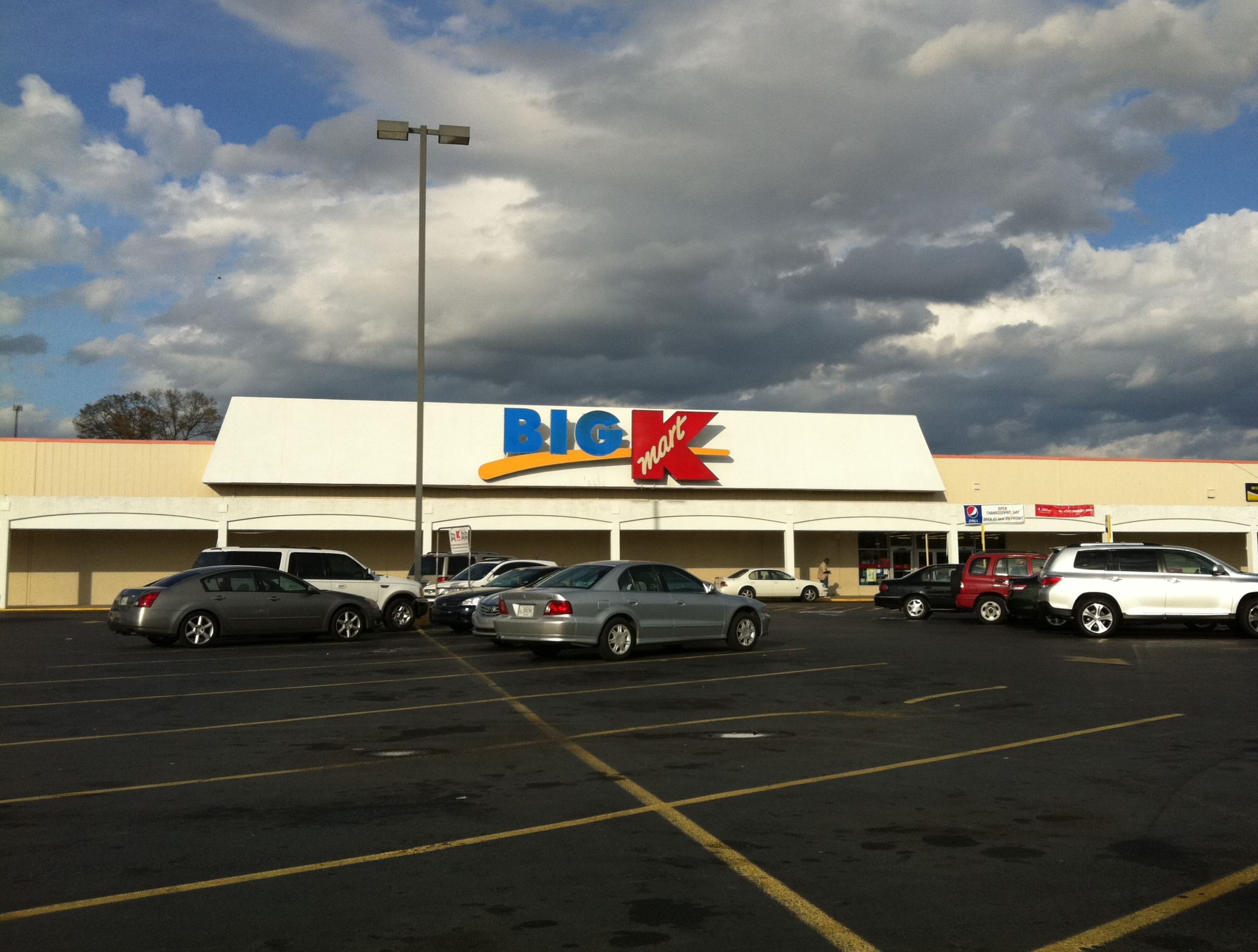
Former Kmart store on Gordon Highway in Augusta

Just before passing the Pointe South Golf Club, US 25/SR 121 begin to travel along the Hephzibah–Augusta city line. They intersect SR 88. After curving to the north, they reenter Augusta proper. They pass the Richmond Factory Pond and Richmond Factory Pond Dam and curve to the northeast. Then they pass by the East Central Regional Hospital–Gracewood. The two highways cross over Butler Creek and make a gradual winding path to an interchange with I-520 (Bobby Jones Expressway), passing to the west of Foss Park and the Charles B. Webster Detention Center and to the east of Rollins Elementary School and Sego Middle School along the way. US 25/SR 121 intersect Windsor Spring Road, which is also part of the I-520 interchange. The roadway curves to the north. At the intersection with Lumpkin Road, they pass Alleluia Community School. The concurrency crosses over Rocky Creek just southeast of Lombard Pond. It curves to the northeast and intersects Tubman Home Road and SR 56 (Mike Padgett Highway). Approximately 0.2 miles (0.32 km) later, they have an interchange with US 1/US 78/US 278/SR 10 (Gordon Highway) and begin to travel concurrently with those four highways. The six-highway concurrency continue north to an intersection with Molly Pond Road and Doug Barnard Parkway (former SR 56 Spur). Just before that intersection, the roadway begins to curve to the northeast. The highways pass Magnolia Cemetery, Cedar Grove Cemetery, and May Park and James Brown Arena. A short distance later, they pass the Old Medical College and the Old Government House, then an interchange with US 25 Business (US 25 Bus.)/SR 28 (Broad Street). Here, US 25 Bus. ends. Just after this interchange, the highway crosses over the Savannah River into South Carolina. At the state line, SR 10 ends, while US 1/US 25/US 78/US 278/SR 121 (Continues as South Carolina Highway 121) curves to the northeast toward North Augusta.

=== National Highway System ===
From its southern, in Brunswick, to Ludowici and from I-16, south-southwest of Statesboro to its northern terminus, at the South Carolina state line on the northeastern edge of Augusta are included as part of the National Highway System, a system of routes determined to be the most important for the nation's economy, mobility, and defense.

== History ==
=== 1920s ===
The road that would later be designated as part of US 25 was established in 1920 as an unidentified road from Brunswick to about Sterling, SR 27 from that point to Jesup, SR 38 from Jesup to Ludowici, SR 23 from Statesboro to Millen, and SR 21 from Millen to Augusta. By the end of the next year, SR 23 was designated between Ludowici and Glennville, SR 26 was designated on a routing southwest of, and into, Statesboro, SR 46 was designated between Statesboro and Hopeulikit, and SR 67 was designated from Hopeulikit to a point southwest of Millen. The latter two supplanting SR 23, which was rerouted on a more westerly path. By the end of 1926, US 341 was designated along SR 27 between Brunswick and Jesup. By the end of 1929, US 80 had been designated along SR 46 between Statesboro and Hopeulikit.

=== 1930s ===
By 1932, US 341/SR 27 were paved in Glynn County. Also, SR 73 was designated from Clayton to an intersection with SR 26 southwest of Statesboro, approximately where I-16 is today. Farther to the north-northwest, US 25 was designated from Hopeulikit to Augusta, and US 25/SR 21 were paved from Waynesboro to Augusta. That January, the positions of SR 26 and SR 46 were swapped. In April, SR 23's Ludowici–Darien segment was redesignated as part of SR 99; SR 23 was rerouted along SR 38 between Jesup and Ludowici. By May 1933, that Jesup–Ludowici segment of SR 23/SR 38 was paved. In May, US 25/SR 21 were paved from Millen to just north of the Jenkins–Burke county line. In July, SR 23 was paved from the Long–Tattnall county line to Glennville. In late 1934, SR 73 was extended southward from Claxton to Glennville. A vert short stretch of SR 46 south of Statesboro was paved. US 25/SR 67 was paved from just southeast of the SR 23 intersection south-southwest of Millen and into that town. Between June and October 1935, US 25/SR 21 was paved between the Jenkins–Burke county line and Waynesboro. At the end of that year, nearly half of US 341/SR 27, between the Glynn–Wayne county line and Jesup, was paved. In mid-to-late 1936, SR 46 was paved from the SR 73 intersection southwest of Statesboro into the city. About one year later, all of US 341/SR 27 between Brunswick and Jesup were paved. Also, a short stretch of SR 23 northwest of Ludowici was paved. In August 1938, all of SR 23 between Ludowici and Glennville was paved. By mid-1939, US 25 was designated along US 341/SR 27 between Sterling (and perhaps Brunswick) and Jesup. It was also designated along SR 23 between Ludowici and Glennville and along SR 73 between Claxton and the intersection with SR 46, southwest of Statesboro. It is unclear whether it was designated along the stretches of roadway in between those.

=== 1940s ===
Between April and July 1941, US 25/SR 73, between the Evans–Bulloch county line and the intersection with SR 46, were paved. In 1942, SR 73 was paved from Glennville to the Tattnall–Evans county line. In 1943, SR 73 was paved all the way from Glennville to Claxton. By the end of 1946, US 25 was designated along SR 23/SR 38 between Jesup and Ludowici. In Augusta, US 25 (and presumably SR 21) approached downtown on Savannah Road. It intersected US 1/US 78 (Milledgeville Road). The three highways traveled to the northeast on Twiggs Street until just past Gwinnett Street, where they curved to the north-northeast onto 7th Street. At the intersection with SR 28 (Broad Street), US 1/US 78 turned right, while US 25 turned left. At 13th Street, US 25 turned to the right and crossed into South Carolina. Also, all stretches of road from Brunswick to Augusta were paved. By the middle of 1948, US 301 was designated along US 25/SR 23 from Ludowici to Glennville.

=== 1950s ===
By the end of 1953, US 301 was designated along SR 73 between Glennville and Claxton. In 1955, US 278 was added to the intersection of US 1/US 78 and US 25 in Augusta. Also, US 1/US 78 left the concurrency with US 25 just past Gwinnett Street and turned right onto Calhoun Street, then left onto 8th Street. In 1956, the four U.S. Highways in Augusta were rerouted on a bypass to the east of the main part of downtown. The former route of US 78 became part of SR 12, and the former route of US 1 became part of SR 4. SR 4 also took the former route of US 25 through the city but ended at SR 28. US 25 followed the bypass onto 8th Street with US 1/US 78/US 278. At the intersection with SR 28, it turned left as it had done previously, just a little farther to the east-southeast. It appears that US 278 ended at this intersection. SR 21 followed Savannah Road and ended at the intersection with SR 4.

=== 1960s ===
By the middle of 1960, US 25 was no longer routed on Broad and 13th streets. It was rerouted to continue following US 1/US 78 and SR 10, which had only recently joined the concurrency. In its place was the newly commissioned US 25 Bus. Between 1960 and 1963, SR 121 was designated, concurrent with US 25, as it does today. At least as far back as 1965, US 25/US 341/SR 27 traveled through Brunswick on Norwich Street, before being moved slightly to the west. During this time period, the eastern bypass in Augusta was named Gordon Highway. SR 121's concurrent section was designated along US 25, as it exists today. The Gordon Highway–Broad Street intersection was reconfigured into an interchange.

=== 1980s ===
In the early part of the decade, SR 21's concurrency with US 25 was truncated at Millen. Between 1983 and 1986, US 25/US 341/SR 27 were moved to the west in Brunswick to follow Newcastle Street.

== Future ==
Interstate 3
- Location: Savannah, Georgia–Knoxville, Tennessee

The segment of US 25 from I-16 south-southwest of Statesboro north to Millen is the western segment of the Savannah River Parkway, a four-lane divided highway that roughly parallels the Savannah River. The segment from Millen north to I-520 in Augusta is the combined segment of the parkway. This highway is being considered for inclusion as part of I-3, which is ultimately planned to stretch from Savannah to Knoxville, Tennessee.

== Major intersections ==
County	Location	mi	km	Destinations	Notes
Glynn	Brunswick	0.000	0.000	US 17 / SR 25 (Glynn Avenue) / SR 25 Conn. begins – St. Simons, Darien, Savannah, Jekyll Island, Woodbine, Jacksonville	Southern terminus; eastern terminus of SR 25 Conn.; eastern end of SR 25 Conn. concurrency
Glynn	Brunswick	1.120	1.802	US 341 south / SR 27 east (Bay Street) / SR 25 Conn. ends	Western terminus of SR 25 Conn.; western end of SR 25 Conn. concurrency; southern end of US 341/SR 27 concurrency
see US 341
Wayne	Jesup	38.772	62.397	US 341 north / SR 27 west (Cherry Street) / US 301 south / SR 23 south – Downtown Jesup, Baxley, Nahunta, Airport	Northern end of US 341/SR 27 concurrency; southern end of US 301/SR 23 concurrency
Wayne	Jesup	41.217	66.332	US 84 west / SR 38 west – Business District	Southern end of US 84/SR 38 concurrency; interchange; no northbound exit
Altamaha River		44.570	71.728	Dr. J. Alvin Leaphart Sr. Memorial Bridge	
Long	Ludowici	50.931	81.965	US 84 east / SR 38 east / SR 57 south (McDonald Street) to I-95 – Hinesville, Darien, Ludowici Well Pavilion Historic Site	Northern end of US 84/SR 38 concurrency; southern end of SR 57 concurrency
Tattnall		70.103	112.820	SR 196 east – Hinesville	Western terminus of SR 196
Tattnall	Glennville	71.922	115.747	SR 23 north / SR 57 north / SR 73 begins / SR 144 (Barnard Street) – Reidsville, Baxley, Fort Stewart, Gordonia-Alatamaha State Park & Golf Course	Northern end of SR 23 and SR 57 concurrencies; southern end of SR 73 concurrency; southern terminus of SR 73
Evans	Claxton	87.563	140.919	US 280 / SR 30 / SR 129 (Main Street) – Reidsville, Metter, Pembroke	
Evans	Claxton	89.437	143.935	Claxton Bridge over Canoochee River	
Evans		93.929	151.164	SR 169 south – Bellville	Northern terminus of SR 169
Bulloch		98.268	158.147	I-16 (SR 404) – Macon, Savannah	I-16 exit 116
Bulloch		101.904	163.999	SR 46 – Metter, Savannah	
Bulloch	Statesboro	107.359	172.778	US 25 Byp. north / US 301 Byp. north / SR 67 Byp. (Veterans Memorial Parkway / SR 73 Byp. north) – Millen, Paulson Stadium, Sylvania, Airport	Southern terminus of US 25 Byp. and US 301 Byp./SR 73 Byp.
Bulloch	Statesboro	109.236	175.798	SR 67 south (Fair Road) – Pembroke, Hinesville, Fort Stewart	Southern end of SR 67 concurrency
Bulloch	Statesboro	110.352	177.594	US 80 east / SR 26 east (Northside Drive) / US 301 north / SR 73 north (North Main Street) – Sylvania, Savannah, Airport	Northern end of US 301 and SR 73 concurrencies; southern end of US 80/SR 26 concurrency
Bulloch		112.464	180.993	US 25 Byp. south / SR 67 Byp. south (Veterans Memorial Parkway) – Claxton, Ogeechee Technical College	Northern terminus of US 25 Byp./SR 67 Byp.
Bulloch	Hopeulikit	116.879	188.099	US 80 west / SR 26 west – Portal, Twin City, Swainsboro, George L. Smith State Park	Northern end of US 80/SR 26 concurrency
Jenkins		133.549	214.926	SR 121 south – Metter	Southern end of SR 121 concurrency
Jenkins		135.247	217.659	SR 23 south – Garfield	Southern end of SR 23 concurrency
Jenkins	Millen	138.081	222.220	SR 17 Byp. east (South Gray Street) – Scarboro	Southern end of SR 17 Byp. concurrency
Jenkins	Millen	138.713	223.237	SR 17 / SR 23 north / SR 67 north (West Winthrope Avenue) – Midville, Rocky Ford, Sardis, Sylvania	Northern end of SR 17 Byp., SR 23, and SR 67 concurrencies; northern terminus of SR 17 Byp.
Jenkins	Millen	140.258	225.723	SR 21 south – Sylvania	Northern terminus of SR 21
Burke		156.515	251.886	US 25 Byp. north / SR 121 Byp. north (Burke Veterans Parkway) – Waynesboro	Southern terminus of US 25 Byp./SR 121 Byp.
Burke		157.505	253.480	US 25 Byp. / SR 121 Byp. (Burke Veterans Parkway) – Millen, Augusta	Interchange
Burke	Waynesboro	158.347	254.835	SR 24 east – Sardis, Sylvania	Southern end of SR 24 concurrency
Burke	Waynesboro	159.299	256.367	SR 24 west / SR 56 / SR 80 (Sixth / Peace Street) – Vidette, Louisville, Swainsboro, Midville, McBean, Wrens, Plant Vogtle	Northern end of SR 24 concurrency
Burke	Waynesboro	160.426	258.181	US 25 Byp. south / SR 121 Byp. south (Burke Veterans Parkway)	Northern terminus of US 25 Byp./SR 121 Byp.
Richmond	Augusta–Hephzibah line	175.845	282.995	SR 88 west – Hephzibah, Wrens	Eastern terminus of SR 88
Richmond	Augusta	182.130	293.110	I-520 (Bobby Jones Expressway / SR 415) to I-20 – Columbia, Atlanta	I-520 exit 7
Richmond	Augusta	184.399	296.761	SR 56 south (Mike Padgett Highway)	Northern terminus of SR 56
Richmond	Augusta	184.858	297.500	US 1 south / US 78 west / US 278 west / SR 10 west (Gordon Highway) – Wrens, Louisville, Fort Gordon, Thomson	Southern end of US 1/US 78/US 278 and SR 10 concurrencies; interchange
Richmond	Augusta	186.162	299.599	Molly Pond Road north / Doug Barnard Parkway south – Augusta Regional Airport	Southern terminus of Molly Pond Road; northern terminus of Doug Barnard Parkway; former SR 56 Spur south
Richmond	Augusta	188.690	303.667	US 25 Bus. north / SR 28 (Broad Street) – Downtown Augusta, Fort Discovery	Interchange; southern terminus of US 25 Bus.; also serves Bay Street; eastbound lanes have access via Bay Street
Richmond	Augusta	188.938	304.066	US 1 north / US 25 north / US 78 east / US 278 east / SC 121 north / SR 10 ends – Columbia	Northern end of US 1, US 78, US 278, SR 10 and SR 121 concurrencies; eastern terminus of SR 10; SR 121 continues as SC 121; continuation to South Carolina beyond the Savannah River
1.000 mi = 1.609 km; 1.000 km = 0.621 mi: Concurrency terminus

== See also ==
- Special routes of U.S. Route 25

U.S. Route 25
Previous state: Terminus	Georgia	Next state: South Carolina
