= Georgia State Route 67 =

State highway in Georgia, United States

State Route 67
- Georgia State Route 67 highlighted in red

Route information
- Maintained by GDOT
- Length: 59.2 mi (95.3 km)
- Existed: 1921–present

Major junctions
- South end: Dead end at the northern edge of Fort Stewart, southeast of Pembroke
- US 280 / SR 30 in Pembroke; I-16 northwest of Pembroke; US 301 Byp. / SR 67 Byp. / SR 73 Byp. in Statesboro; US 25 / US 301 / SR 73 in Statesboro; US 80 / SR 26 in Statesboro; US 301 / SR 73 in Statesboro; US 25 Byp. / SR 67 Byp. northwest of Statesboro; US 80 / SR 26 northwest of Statesboro; US 25 / SR 17 / SR 17 Byp. / SR 121 in Millen
- North end: SR 21 east of Millen

Location
- Country: United States
- State: Georgia
- Counties: Bryan, Bulloch, Jenkins

Highway system
- Georgia State Highway System; Interstate; US; State; Special
← SR 66	→ SR 68

State Route 67 (SR 67) is a 59.2-mile-long (95.3 km) state highway that runs south-to-north through portions of Bryan, Bulloch, and Jenkins counties in the east-central part of the U.S. state of Georgia. The route connects Fort Stewart and Pembroke with Millen, via Statesboro.

== Route description ==
SR 67 begins on the northeastern edge of Fort Stewart, approximately 2.2 miles (3.5 km) southeast of Pembroke, within Bryan County. The highway travels northwest, through rural areas of the county, into Pembroke. It curve to the north-northeast to an intersection with US 280/SR 30 (East Bacon Street). At this intersection both SR 67 and SR 119 join that concurrency. One block later, SR 67 splits off to the north, while SR 119 splits off to the south. SR 67 continues to the northwest, leaving town and crosses into Bulloch County. The highway continues to the northwest and has an interchange with Interstate 16 (I-16), that's where SR 46 west begins, just before entering Denmark. In Denmark, it intersects SR 46 west. It passes through rural areas of the county, until it enters Statesboro. In town, it intersects US 301 Bypass/SR 67 Bypass/SR 73 Bypass (Veterans Memorial Parkway), at the southeastern edge of Georgia Southern University. It runs along the northeastern edge of the university, before meeting US 25/US 301/SR 73 (South Main Street). The four highway head concurrent to the north. At East Main Street, they intersect the western terminus of SR 24. In the main part of town, they intersect US 80/SR 26. There, US 301/SR 73 split off to the north and northeast, while US 25/US 80/SR 26/SR 67 head northwest. Just after leaving town, they meet US 25 Bypass/SR 67 Bypass. In Hopeulikit, US 80/SR 26 split off to the southwest. Here, US 25/SR 67 continue to the northwest and enter Jenkins County. A little distance before entering Millen, first SR 121 and then SR 23 join the concurrency. Just after entering Millen, SR 17 Bypass (South Gray Street) joins the concurrency. The five routes head concurrent into the main part of town. At SR 17 (Winthrope Avenue), SR 17 Bypass ends, US 25/SR 121 continue to the north, and SR 17/SR 23/SR 67 head concurrent to the east. At Masonic Street, SR 17 splits off to the south, and SR 23 splits off to the north. SR 67 continues to the east, passing the Jenkins County Hospital. Then, it continue to the east until it meets its northern terminus, an intersection with SR 21 (Millen Bypass), just east of town.

The following portions of SR 67 are part of the National Highway System, a system of routes determined to be the most important for the nation's economy, mobility, and defense:

- From the southern end of the US 280/SR 30/SR 119 concurrency, in Pembroke, to the I-16 interchange, south-southeast of Denmark
- From the southern end of the US 25/US 301/SR 73 concurrency, in Statesboro, to the northern end of the US 25, SR 17 Byp., and SR 121 concurrencies, in Millen

== History ==
The road that would become SR 67 was established at least as early as 1919 as part of SR 23 from present-day US 80 northwest of Statesboro to Emmalane in Jenkins County. In 1921, SR 23 was rerouted to serve the city of Graymont in Emanuel County. The route that used to be SR 23 became SR 67.

In 1989, a bypass of Millen was proposed; six years later, SR 21 was shifted there and SR 67 was extended beyond Millen.

=== State Route 63 (1921–1967) ===
State Route 63
- Location: Fancy Hall–Pembroke
- Length: 38.2 mi (61.5 km)
- Existed: 1921–1967

==== State Route 63 Spur ====
State Route 63 Spur
- Location: Southeast of Richmond Hill–Fort McAllister
- Existed: 1966–1967

== Major intersections ==
County	Location	mi	km	Destinations	Notes
Bryan	Fort Stewart	0.0	0.0	Dead end at the northeastern edge of Fort Stewart	Southern terminus; roadway blocked, no access to post
Bryan	Pembroke	3.3	5.3	US 280 east (East Bacon Street east / SR 30 east) / SR 119 north (North College Street north) to I-16 – Savannah, Springfield	Southern end of US 280/SR 30/SR 119 concurrency
Bryan	Pembroke	3.3	5.3	US 280 west / SR 30 west (West Bacon Street west) / SR 119 south (South Main Street) – Claxton	Northern end of US 280/SR 30/SR 119 concurrency
Bulloch		13.4	21.6	I-16 (Jim L. Gillis Highway / SR 404) / SR 46 begins – Macon, Savannah	Eastern terminus of SR 46; southern end of SR 46 concurrency; I-16 exit 127
Bulloch	Denmark	14.8	23.8	SR 46 west – Register	Northern end of SR 46 concurrency
Bulloch	Statesboro	24.6	39.6	US 301 Byp. / SR 67 Byp. north (Veterans Memorial Parkway / SR 73 Byp.) – Claxton, Sylvania, Georgia Southern University, Paulson Stadium, Ogeechee Technical College, Mill Creek Park	Southern terminus of SR 67 Byp.; provides access to Statesboro–Bulloch County Airport
Bulloch	Statesboro	27.2	43.8	US 25 south / US 301 south (South Main Street / SR 73 south) – Claxton	Southern end of US 25 and US 301/SR 73 concurrencies
Bulloch	Statesboro	28.3	45.5	US 80 east (Northside Drive east / SR 26 east) / US 301 north (North Main Street north / SR 73 north) – Savannah, Sylvania	Northern end of US 301/SR 73 concurrency; southern end of US 80/SR 26 concurrency
Bulloch		30.4	48.9	US 25 Byp. south (Veterans Memorial Parkway south / SR 67 Byp. south) – Claxton, Ogeechee Technical College	Northern terminus of US 25 Byp. and SR 67 Byp.; provides access to Willingway Hospital
Bulloch	Hopeulikit	34.8	56.0	US 80 west / SR 26 west – Portal, Twin City, Swainsboro, George L. Smith State Park	Northern end of US 80/SR 26 concurrency
Jenkins		51.5	82.9	SR 121 south – Metter	Southern end of SR 121 concurrency
Jenkins		53.2	85.6	SR 23 south – Garfield	Southern end of SR 23 concurrency
Jenkins	Millen	56.1	90.3	SR 17 Byp. east (South Gray Street) – Scarboro	Southern end of SR 17 Byp. concurrency
Jenkins	Millen	56.7	91.2	US 25 north / SR 121 north / SR 17 north (West Winthrope Avenue) / SR 17 Byp. ends – Midville, Magnolia Springs State Park	Northern end of US 25/SR 121 and SR 17 Byp. concurrencies; southern end of SR 17 concurrency; northern terminus of SR 17 Byp.
Jenkins	Millen	57.4	92.4	SR 17 south (South Masonic Street) – Rocky Ford	Northern end of SR 17 concurrency
Jenkins	Millen	57.4	92.4	SR 23 north (North Masonic Street) – Sardis	Northern end of SR 23 concurrency
Jenkins		59.2	95.3	SR 21 / Buttermilk Road east – Sylvania, Sardis, Waynesboro	Northern terminus of SR 67; western terminus of Buttermilk Road
1.000 mi = 1.609 km; 1.000 km = 0.621 mi: Concurrency terminus

== Statesboro bypass ==
State Route 67 Bypass
- Location: Statesboro
- Length: 7.3 mi (11.7 km)

State Route 67 Bypass (SR 67 Byp.) is a 7.3-mile-long (11.7 km) bypass route of SR 67 that exists entirely within the central part of Bulloch County. The southern part is located within the Statesboro city limits. It is entirely concurrent with U.S. Route 25 Bypass (US 25 Byp.) and is also partially concurrent with US 301 Byp./SR 73 Byp. The entire length of US 25 Byp./SR 67 Byp. and US 301 Byp./SR 73 Byp. is known as Veterans Memorial Parkway.

It begins at an intersection with the SR 67 mainline (Fair Road) in the southeastern part of Statesboro. At this intersection, SR 67 Byp. begins a concurrency with US 301 Byp./SR 73 Byp. (Veterans Memorial Parkway) to the west. The three highways skirt along the southern edge of Georgia Southern University until they intersect US 25/US 301/SR 73 (South Main Street). At this intersection, US 301 Byp./SR 73 Byp. end, and US 25 Bypass begins. The two highways leave the city limits and skirt around the western side of the city until they meet their northern terminus, an intersection with US 25/US 80/SR 26/SR 67 just northwest of the town.

The entire length of SR 67 Byp. is part of the National Highway System, a system of routes determined to be the most important for the nation's economy, mobility, and defense.

The entire route is in Bulloch County.

Location	mi	km	Destinations	Notes
Statesboro	0.0	0.0	US 301 Byp. north (Veterans Memorial Parkway / SR 73 Byp. north) / SR 67 (Fair Road) – Statesboro, Pembroke, Sylvania	Southern end of US 301 Byp./SR 73 Byp. concurrency; southern terminus; provides access to East Georgia Regional Medical Center
Statesboro	2.3	3.7	US 301 / SR 73 (US 25) / US 25 Byp. begins / US 301 Byp. ends (Veterans Memorial Parkway / SR 73 Byp. ends) to I-16 – Claxton, Statesboro, Historic Downtown Statesboro, Averitt Arts Center, East Georgia State College, Ogeechee Tech	Northern end of US 301 Byp./SR 73 Byp. concurrency; southern end of US 25 Byp. concurrency; southern terminus of US 25 Byp., US 301 Byp., and SR 73 Byp.
	7.3	11.7	US 25 / US 80 / SR 26 / SR 67 / US 25 Byp. ends – Statesboro, Millen, Magnolia Springs State Park	Northern end of US 25 Byp. concurrency; northern terminus of US 25 Byp. and SR 67 Byp.
1.000 mi = 1.609 km; 1.000 km = 0.621 mi: Concurrency terminus
