= Georgia State Route 121 =

Highway in Georgia

State Route 121
- SR 121 highlighted in red; US 25 Byp./SR 121 Byp. highlighted in blue

Route information
- Maintained by GDOT
- Length: 238.6 mi (384.0 km)
- Tourist routes: Woodpecker Trail

Major junctions
- South end: SR 121 at the Florida state line south of Saint George
- US 1 / US 23 / US 301 / SR 4 / SR 15 in Folkston; US 301 / SR 23 in Homeland; US 1 / US 23 / SR 4 in Racepond; US 82 / SR 520 in Hoboken; US 84 / SR 38 in Blackshear; US 280 in Reidsville; I-16 in Metter; US 80 / SR 26 east of Twin City; US 25 / SR 67 south-southeast of Emmalane; I-520 in Augusta
- North end: US 1 / US 25 / US 78 / US 278 / SC 121 at the South Carolina state line in Augusta

Location
- Country: United States
- State: Georgia
- Counties: Charlton, Brantley, Pierce, Appling, Tattnall, Candler, Emanuel, Jenkins, Burke, and Richmond

Highway system
- Georgia State Highway System; Interstate; US; State; Special
← SR 120	→ SR 122

Georgia State Route 121 (SR 121) is a 238-mile-long (383 km) state highway between Charlton County and Augusta. It is part of a long multi-state route beginning in Florida and ending in South Carolina.

== Route description ==
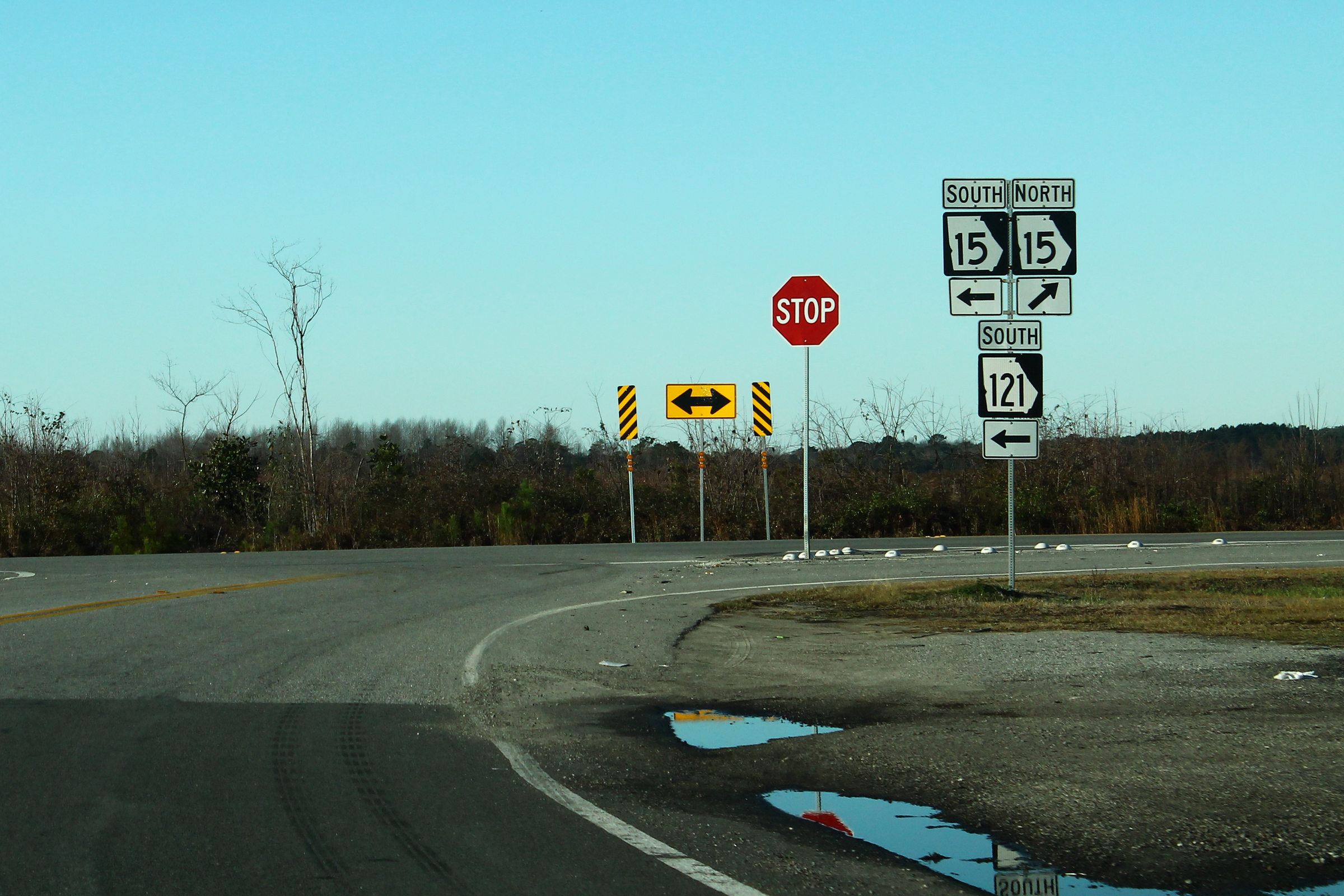
SR 121 and SR 15 north of Bristol

SR 121 begins in rural Charlton County at the Florida state line near the southernmost point in the state. Here, the roadway continues as State Road 121. From the state line, it travels to the north, concurrent with SR 23. This segment of the route is called the Okefenokee Parkway. After passing through St. George, it has a concurrency with US 1/US 23/US 301/SR 4/SR 15 in Folkston. Shortly afterwards, US 301/SR 23 split from the other routes, while US 1/US 23/SR 4/SR 15/SR 121 stay concurrent until Racepond, where US 1/US 23/SR 4 continue to the northwest while SR 15/SR 121 branch off to the northeast. In Hoboken, the routes intersect with US 82/SR 520. In Blackshear is an intersection with US 84/SR 38. North of this intersection, SR 15 splits off to the northwest, while SR 121 heads to the northeast again. The road has a brief concurrency with SR 203 shortly afterwards. In Surrency, the road intersects US 341/SR 27. Later, SR 169, and then SR 144 form brief concurrencies with the road. A short time later, the route is reunited with SR 23/SR 57 and becomes concurrent with one of these two routes once again. In Reidsville, the route intersects US 280/SR 30. In Cobbtown, SR 57 splits off. Just south of Metter is an interchange with Interstate 16 (I-16), specifically Exit 104. Within Metter itself, SR 23 splits off. North of Metter, US 80/SR 26 intersect with the road. North of that junction, SR 121 begins a concurrency with US 25/SR 67. SR 23 joins the concurrency shortly afterward. In Millen, SR 23/SR 67 split off. SR 24 briefly joins the concurrency in Waynesboro. In Augusta, SR 121 travels concurrently with US 1/US 25/US 78/US 278/SR 10 along Gordon Highway and serves as a major road. At the South Carolina state line, SR 10 ends, and US 1/US 25/US 78/US 278 continue, concurrent with what is now South Carolina Highway 121.

=== Woodpecker Trail ===
In 2004, the Senate and Georgia House of Representatives of the state of Georgia passed legislation designating SR 121 as the Woodpecker Trail Highway from the Florida state line to the South Carolina state line and was signed into law by Governor Sonny Perdue on May 17, 2004. On September 19, 2005, Governor Perdue and others officially dedicated the Woodpecker Trail Highway in Augusta. A newly designed Woodpecker Trail logo was imprinted onto highway signs which have been placed along the trail at key highway junction points.

The origin of the trail's name dates back to the 1920s when it was listed by AAA, and, in the 1940s, highway signs using Walter Lantz's Woody Woodpecker character marked the highway but eventually fell out of use. Of course, it was in use before then, maybe as early as 1915 by Native Americans, horse-drawn buggies, and the first horseless carriages.

While the highway continues into Florida and South Carolina as State Road 121, efforts to continue the Woodpecker Trail designation and signage in those states have been unsuccessful.

== Major intersections ==
County	Location	mi	km	Destinations	Notes
St. Marys River		0.0	0.0	SR 121 south – Macclenny	Continuation to Florida; southern terminus of SR 23 and southern end of SR 23 concurrency
St. Marys River		0.0	0.0	Florida–Georgia state line	
Charlton		0.4	0.64	SR 185 north – Moniac	Southern terminus of SR 185
Charlton	Saint George	13.2	21.2	SR 94 (Moniac Road) – Moniac, Fargo, Crawford	
Charlton	Folkston	36.1	58.1	US 1 south / US 23 south / US 301 south / SR 4 south / SR 15 south – Hilliard, Jacksonville	Southern end of US 1/US 23/US 301/SR 4 and SR 15 concurrencies
Charlton	Folkston	36.2	58.3	SR 40 Conn. east (Cross Street) – Kingsland, White Oak, D. Ray James Prison	Western terminus of SR 40 Conn.
Charlton	Folkston–Homeland line	38.8	62.4	US 301 north / SR 23 north – Nahunta, Jesup	Interchange; northern end of US 301 and SR 23 concurrencies
Charlton	Racepond	50.7	81.6	US 1 north / US 23 north / SR 4 north – Waycross	Northern end of US 1/US 23/SR 4 concurrency
Brantley	Hoboken	63.3	101.9	US 82 / SR 520 (Main Street) – Waycross, Nahunta, Laura S. Walker State Park	
Pierce	Blackshear	74.2	119.4	US 84 / SR 38 – Waycross, Patterson	
Pierce	Blackshear	74.3	119.6	SR 203 north (Strickland Avenue) – Alma	Southern terminus of SR 203
Pierce	Bristol	84.2	135.5	SR 32 – Alma, Patterson	
Appling		92.0	148.1	SR 15 north – Baxley	Northern end of SR 15 concurrency
Appling		94.2	151.6	SR 203 south – Alma, Baxley	Southern end of SR 203 concurrency
Appling		94.5	152.1	SR 203 north (K'Ville Highway) – Jesup, Screven	Northern end of SR 203 concurrency
Appling	Surrency	103.8	167.0	US 341 / SR 27 – Baxley, Jesup	
Appling		113.7	183.0	SR 169 south (Lanes Bridge Road) – Jesup	Southern end of SR 169 concurrency
Appling		113.8	183.1	SR 144 west – Baxley	Southern end of SR 144 concurrency
Tattnall		119.5	192.3	SR 178 west – State Prison	Eastern terminus of SR 178
Tattnall	Five Points	120.5	193.9	SR 144 east (Hencart Road) – Glennville	Northern end of SR 144 concurrency
Tattnall	Five Points	120.7	194.2	SR 169 north (Mendes Highway) – Claxton	Northern end of SR 169 concurrency
Tattnall		130.7	210.3	SR 23 south / SR 57 south (Romie Waters Highway) – Glennville	Southern end of SR 23 and SR 57 concurrencies
Tattnall	Reidsville	134.2	216.0	US 280 / SR 30 (Brazell Street) – Lyons, Claxton	
Tattnall	Collins	140.9	226.8	SR 292 (Manassas Street) – Lyons, Claxton	
Tattnall	Cobbtown	148.1	238.3	SR 152 west – Lyons	Eastern terminus of SR 152
Tattnall	Cobbtown	148.2	238.5	SR 57 north – Aline, Stillmore, Swainsboro	Northern end of SR 57 concurrency
Candler	Metter	156.0	251.1	I-16 (SR 404) – Macon, Savannah	I-16 exit 104
Candler	Metter	157.7	253.8	SR 23 north / SR 46 (Broad Street) – Soperton, Statesboro	Northern end of SR 23 concurrency
Emanuel		169.2	272.3	US 80 / SR 26	
Jenkins		182.9	294.3	US 25 south / SR 67 south – Statesboro	Southern end of US 25 and SR 67 concurrencies
Jenkins		184.9	297.6	SR 23 south – Garfield	Southern end of SR 23 concurrency
Jenkins	Millen	186.9	300.8	SR 17 Byp. east (South Gray Street) – Scarboro	Southern end of SR 17 Byp. concurrency
Jenkins	Millen	187.5	301.8	SR 17 / SR 23 north / SR 67 north (West Winthrope Avenue) – Midville, Rocky Ford, Sardis, Sylvania	Northern end of SR 17 Byp., SR 23, and SR 67 concurrencies; northern terminus of SR 17 Byp.
Jenkins	Millen	189.1	304.3	SR 21 south – Sylvania	Northern terminus of SR 21
Burke		205.4	330.6	US 25 Byp. north / SR 121 Byp. north (Burke Veterans Parkway) – Waynesboro	Southern terminus of US 25 Byp./SR 121 Byp.
Burke		206.2	331.8	US 25 Byp. / SR 121 Byp. (Burke Veterans Parkway) – Millen, Augusta	Interchange
Burke	Waynesboro	207.2	333.5	SR 24 east – Sardis, Sylvania	Southern end of SR 24 concurrency
Burke	Waynesboro	208.2	335.1	SR 24 west / SR 56 / SR 80 (Sixth / Peace Street) – Vidette, Louisville, Swainsboro, Midville, McBean, Wrens, Plant Vogtle	Northern end of SR 24 concurrency
Burke	Waynesboro	209.3	336.8	US 25 Byp. south / SR 121 Byp. south (Burke Veterans Parkway)	Northern terminus of US 25 Byp./SR 121 Byp.
Richmond	Augusta–Hephzibah line	224.8	361.8	SR 88 west – Hephzibah, Wrens	Eastern terminus of SR 88
Richmond	Augusta	231.0	371.8	I-520 (Bobby Jones Expressway / SR 415) to I-20 – Columbia, Atlanta	I-520 exit 7
Richmond	Augusta	233.3	375.5	SR 56 south (Mike Padgett Highway)	Northern terminus of SR 56
Richmond	Augusta	233.5	375.8	US 1 south / US 78 west / US 278 west / SR 10 west (Gordon Highway) – Wrens, Louisville, Fort Gordon, Thomson	Southern end of US 1/US 78/US 278 and SR 10 concurrencies; interchange
Richmond	Augusta			Molly Pond Road north / Doug Barnard Parkway south – Augusta Regional Airport	Southern terminus of Molly Pond Road; northern terminus of Doug Barnard Parkway; former SR 56 Spur south
Richmond	Augusta	237.6	382.4	US 25 Bus. north / SR 28 (Broad Street) – Downtown Augusta, Fort Discovery	Interchange; southern terminus of US 25 Bus.; also serves Bay Street; eastbound lanes have access via Bay Street.
Savannah River		238.6	384.0	Georgia–South Carolina state line	
Savannah River		238.6	384.0	US 1 north / US 25 north / US 78 east / US 278 east / SC 121 north (Jefferson Davis Highway north) – Columbia	Continuation to South Carolina; eastern terminus of SR 10 and northern end of SR 10 concurrency
1.000 mi = 1.609 km; 1.000 km = 0.621 mi: Concurrency terminus

== Special routes ==
=== Charlton County spur route ===
State Route 121 Spur
- Location: Charlton County
- Existed: 1976–1993

State Route 121 Spur (SR 121 Spur) was a spur route of SR 121 that existed in the central part of Charlton County, on the eastern side of the Okefenokee Swamp. In 1952, an unnumbered road was established from Camp Cornelia east to SR 23 south-southwest of Folkston. Between June 1960 and June 1963, SR 121 was extended on SR 23. In 1976, this road was designated as SR 121 Spur. In 1993, the spur route was decommissioned.

The entire route was in Charlton County.

Location	mi	km	Destinations	Notes
Camp Cornelia			Dead end	Western terminus
			SR 23 / SR 121	Eastern terminus
1.000 mi = 1.609 km; 1.000 km = 0.621 mi

=== Waynesboro bypass route ===
State Route 121 Bypass
- Location: Waynesboro
- Length: 5.7 mi (9.2 km)
- Existed: 2006–present

State Route 121 Bypass (SR 121 Byp.) is a bypass around most of Waynesboro. It is concurrent with U.S. Route 25 Bypass (US 25 Byp.) for its entire length. It serves to guide traffic around Waynesboro's downtown area to the east as a four lane divided highway.

The entire route is in Burke County.

Location	mi	km	Destinations	Notes
	0.0	0.0	US 25 / SR 121 / US 25 Byp. begins – Millen, Waynesboro	Southern end of US 25 Byp. concurrency; southern terminus of US 25 Byp. and SR 121 Byp.
	0.9	1.4	US 25 / SR 121	Interchange
	1.6	2.6	SR 24 – Sardis	
Waynesboro	4.0	6.4	SR 56 / SR 80 (East 7th Street)	
Waynesboro	5.7	9.2	US 25 / SR 121 / US 25 Byp. ends – Augusta	Northern end of US 25 Byp. concurrency; northern terminus of US 25 Byp. and SR 121 Byp.
1.000 mi = 1.609 km; 1.000 km = 0.621 mi: Concurrency terminus

=== Waynesboro Truck Bypass ===
- Waynesboro Truck Bypass
- Location: Waynesboro
- Length: 2.1 mi (3.4 km)
- Existed: 2025–present

The Waynesboro Truck Bypass is a truck route branching off of US 25/SR 121 in western Waynesboro. It connects the two highways to SR 24/SR 56/SR 80. The entire route is in Burke County.

Location	mi	km	Destinations	Notes
Waynesboro	0.0	0.0	US 25 / SR 121 to US 25 Byp. south / SR 121 Byp. south – Augusta, Millen	Northern terminus
Waynesboro	0.8	1.3	West Quaker Road	
Waynesboro	1.9	3.1	Lovers Lane	Roundabout
Waynesboro	2.1	3.4	SR 24 / SR 56 / SR 80 – Midville, Vidette, Wrens	Southern terminus
1.000 mi = 1.609 km; 1.000 km = 0.621 mi: Concurrency terminus

== See also ==
- Central Savannah River Area
- Transportation in Augusta, Georgia
