= Bulloch County, Georgia =

County in Georgia, United States

- County
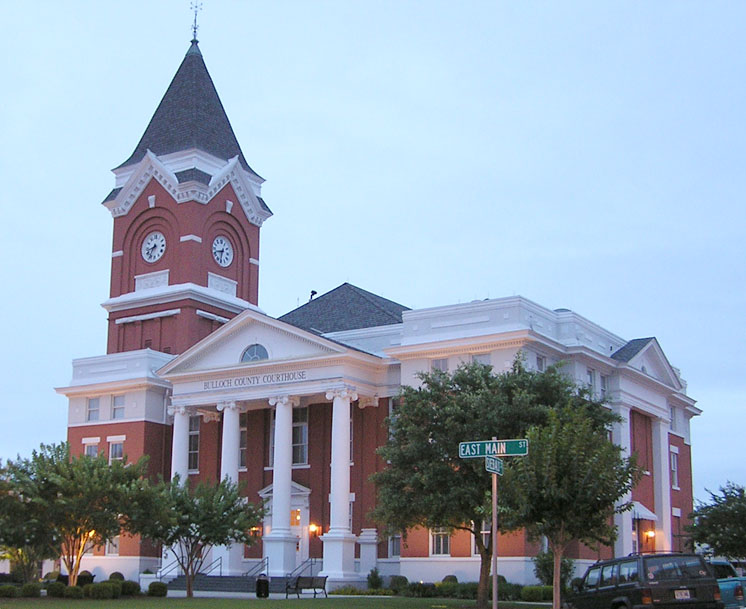
- Bulloch County Courthouse in Statesboro

- Flag Seal

- Location within the U.S. state of Georgia
- Coordinates: 32°23′N 81°44′W
- Country: United States
- State: Georgia
- Founded: 1796; 230 years ago
- Named for: Archibald Bulloch
- Seat: Statesboro
- Largest city: Statesboro

Area
  - Total: 689 sq mi (1,780 km^{2})
  - Land: 673 sq mi (1,740 km^{2})
  - Water: 16 sq mi (41 km^{2}) 2.3%

Population (2020)
  - Total: 81,099
  - Estimate (2025): 86,949 ▲
  - Density: 121/sq mi (46.5/km^{2})
- Time zone: UTC−5 (Eastern)
  - Summer (DST): UTC−4 (EDT)
- Congressional district: 12th
- Website: www.bullochcounty.net

Bulloch County is a county located in the southeastern part of the U.S. state of Georgia. As of the 2020 census, the population was 81,099, up from 70,217 in 2010. The county seat is Statesboro. With Evans County, Bulloch forms part of the Statesboro micropolitan statistical area, a component of the Savannah–Hinesville–Statesboro combined statistical area.

The county was created on February 8, 1796 from colonial-era St. Phillip's parish. It is named after Archibald Bulloch, a planter from South Carolina who served as provincial governor of Georgia. Archibald Bulloch was born in South Carolina but bought a plantation on the Savannah River. Politically active in opposing the British, he became the first provincial governor of Georgia in January 1776.

== Geography ==
According to the U.S. Census Bureau, the county has a total area of 689 square miles (1,780 km^{2}), of which 673 square miles (1,740 km^{2}) is land and 16 square miles (41 km^{2}) (2.3%) is water. The terrain is mostly flat, as the county is in the coastal plain region of Georgia. However, the landscape gets slightly hilly in the northwestern and central portions of the county. Bulloch County is just southwest of the Ogeechee River and has many other small waterways, ponds, and swamps. Trees like bald cypress are seen in these areas. On higher ground, longleaf pine, live oak, and many other tree varieties native to the southeastern United States thrive.

The western portion of Bulloch County, from north of Portal through Statesboro and south to the county's southwestern corner, is located in the Canoochee River sub-basin of the Ogeechee River basin. The eastern portion of the county is located in the Lower Ogeechee River sub-basin of the same Ogeechee River basin.

=== Major highways ===
- I-16 / SR 404 (unsigned)
- US 25
  - US 25 Byp. (Statesboro)
- US 80 / SR 26
- US 301 / SR 73
  - US 301 Byp. (Statesboro)
  - SR 73 Byp.
- SR 24
- SR 46
- SR 67
  - SR 67 Byp.
- SR 92
- SR 119
  - SR 119 Conn.
  - SR 119 Spur
- SR 555 (Savannah River Parkway)

=== Adjacent counties ===
- Screven County (north)
- Effingham County (east)
- Bryan County (southeast)
- Evans County (southwest)
- Candler County (west)
- Emanuel County (northwest)
- Jenkins County (north-northwest)

== Communities ==
=== Cities ===
- Brooklet
- Statesboro

=== Towns ===
- Portal
- Register

=== Unincorporated communities ===
- Adabelle
- Denmark
- Hopeulikit
- Ivanhoe
- Nevils
- Leefield

=== Ghost towns ===
- Hubert

== Demographics ==
Historical population
Census	Pop.	Note	%±
1800	1,913		—
1810	2,305		20.5%
1820	2,578		11.8%
1830	2,587		0.3%
1840	3,102		19.9%
1850	4,300		38.6%
1860	5,668		31.8%
1870	5,610		−1.0%
1880	8,053		43.5%
1890	13,712		70.3%
1900	21,377		55.9%
1910	26,464		23.8%
1920	26,133		−1.3%
1930	26,509		1.4%
1940	26,010		−1.9%
1950	24,740		−4.9%
1960	24,263		−1.9%
1970	31,585		30.2%
1980	35,785		13.3%
1990	43,125		20.5%
2000	55,983		29.8%
2010	70,217		25.4%
2020	81,099		15.5%
2025 (est.)	86,949	▲	7.2%
U.S. Decennial Census; 1790-1880 1890–1910; 1920–1930 1930–1940; 1940–1950 1960–1980; 1980–2000 2010 2020

=== Racial and ethnic composition ===
Bulloch County, Georgia – Racial and ethnic composition Note: the US Census treats Hispanic/Latino as an ethnic category. This table excludes Latinos from the racial categories and assigns them to a separate category. Hispanics/Latinos may be of any race.
Race / Ethnicity (NH = Non-Hispanic)	Pop 1980	Pop 1990	Pop 2000	Pop 2010	Pop 2020	% 1980	% 1990	% 2000	% 2010	% 2020
White alone (NH)	25,866	31,281	37,998	46,251	49,712	72.28%	72.54%	67.87%	65.87%	61.30%
Black or African American alone (NH)	9,423	11,195	16,000	19,252	22,775	26.33%	25.96%	28.58%	27.42%	28.08%
Native American or Alaska Native alone (NH)	19	55	60	142	159	0.05%	0.13%	0.11%	0.20%	0.20%
Asian alone (NH)	91	215	456	1,013	1,283	0.25%	0.50%	0.81%	1.44%	1.58%
Native Hawaiian or Pacific Islander alone (NH)	x	x	15	58	62	x	x	0.03%	0.08%	0.08%
Other race alone (NH)	51	19	47	106	249	0.14%	0.04%	0.08%	0.15%	0.31%
Mixed race or Multiracial (NH)	x	x	355	956	2,679	x	x	0.63%	1.36%	3.30%
Hispanic or Latino (any race)	335	360	1,052	2,439	4,180	0.94%	0.83%	1.88%	3.47%	5.15%
Total	35,785	43,125	55,983	70,217	81,099	100.00%	100.00%	100.00%	100.00%	100.00%

=== 2020 census ===
As of the 2020 census, the county had a population of 81,099. Of the residents, 20.5% were under the age of 18 and 12.0% were 65 years of age or older; the median age was 28.9 years. For every 100 females there were 99.6 males, and for every 100 females age 18 and over there were 99.1 males. 54.9% of residents lived in urban areas and 45.1% lived in rural areas. There were 29,747 households and 16,526 families residing in the county.

The racial makeup of the county was 62.5% White, 28.4% Black or African American, 0.3% American Indian and Alaska Native, 1.6% Asian, 0.1% Native Hawaiian and Pacific Islander, 2.3% from some other race, and 4.8% from two or more races. Hispanic or Latino residents of any race comprised 5.2% of the population.

Of these households, 29.2% had children under the age of 18 living with them and 31.5% had a female householder with no spouse or partner present. About 28.6% of all households were made up of individuals and 8.5% had someone living alone who was 65 years of age or older.

There were 32,983 housing units, of which 9.8% were vacant. Among occupied housing units, 49.9% were owner-occupied and 50.1% were renter-occupied. The homeowner vacancy rate was 1.4% and the rental vacancy rate was 9.0%.

== Education ==
The county has one territorial school district, Bulloch County School District.

CCAT (public school district) maintains a charter school: Statesboro STEAM Academy.

The private school Bulloch Academy is in an unincorporated area.

Other private schools, Trinity Christian School and Bible Baptist Christian Academy reside within Statesboro city limits.

Georgia Southern University is in Statesboro, as is East Georgia State College Statesboro.

Ogeechee Technical College is in an unincorporated area in the county. East Georgia State College Statesboro formerly had a facility unincorporated area, and this became the Georgia Southern Continuing & Professional Education Center.

== Sports ==
South Georgia Tormenta FC fields a professional team in USL League One, the third tier of the American Soccer Pyramid. The club's inaugural season was the 2016 season. Currently, games are played at the new 5,300 capacity Optim Sports Medicine Field at Tormenta Stadium. In 2022, they won the USL League One playoff final against Chattanooga Red Wolves SC by the score of 2–1, lifting their first trophy in their new stadium.

== Politics ==
As of the 2020s, Bulloch County is a Republican stronghold, voting 64% for Donald Trump in 2024. Bulloch County voted in line with most other "Solid South" counties prior to 1964, backing Democratic candidates for president by wide margins. The Civil Rights Act led to vast changes in political party makeup. The county has not backed a Democratic candidate for president since Georgian Jimmy Carter was the party nominee in 1976 and 1980. However, the Republican margins of victory are not as high as other rural counties in the state.

For elections to the United States House of Representatives, Bulloch County is part of Georgia's 12th congressional district, currently represented by Rick Allen. For elections to the Georgia State Senate, Bulloch County is part of District 4. For elections to the Georgia House of Representatives, Bulloch County is divided between districts 158, 159 and 160.

United States presidential election results for Bulloch County, Georgia
Year	Republican		Democratic		Third party(ies)	
Year	No.	%	No.	%	No.	%
1912	17	1.71%	932	93.86%	44	4.43%
1916	29	1.90%	1,410	92.40%	87	5.70%
1920	248	18.42%	1,098	81.58%	0	0.00%
1924	37	3.52%	989	94.01%	26	2.47%
1928	387	23.53%	1,258	76.47%	0	0.00%
1932	17	0.76%	2,203	98.74%	11	0.49%
1936	66	3.22%	1,978	96.53%	5	0.24%
1940	141	6.38%	2,063	93.35%	6	0.27%
1944	274	12.48%	1,921	87.52%	0	0.00%
1948	276	9.35%	2,036	68.95%	641	21.71%
1952	909	20.08%	3,619	79.92%	0	0.00%
1956	901	20.88%	3,414	79.12%	0	0.00%
1960	1,506	30.87%	3,373	69.13%	0	0.00%
1964	4,823	63.94%	2,720	36.06%	0	0.00%
1968	2,113	26.90%	1,788	22.77%	3,953	50.33%
1972	5,683	78.85%	1,524	21.15%	0	0.00%
1976	3,156	37.77%	5,199	62.23%	0	0.00%
1980	3,750	42.04%	4,921	55.16%	250	2.80%
1984	6,117	62.67%	3,644	37.33%	0	0.00%
1988	6,354	64.88%	3,417	34.89%	23	0.23%
1992	5,690	45.00%	4,903	38.78%	2,051	16.22%
1996	6,646	50.97%	5,396	41.38%	997	7.65%
2000	8,990	60.82%	5,561	37.62%	231	1.56%
2004	12,252	63.77%	6,840	35.60%	120	0.62%
2008	14,174	59.12%	9,586	39.98%	216	0.90%
2012	14,174	58.73%	9,593	39.75%	366	1.52%
2016	15,097	59.01%	9,261	36.20%	1,227	4.80%
2020	18,387	61.07%	11,248	37.36%	474	1.57%
2024	20,985	64.26%	11,514	35.26%	158	0.48%

United States Senate election results for Bulloch County, Georgia2
Year	Republican		Democratic		Third party(ies)	
Year	No.	%	No.	%	No.	%
2020	18,232	61.20%	10,846	36.40%	715	2.40%
2020	12,596	67.66%	6,020	32.34%	0	0.00%

United States Senate election results for Bulloch County, Georgia3
Year	Republican		Democratic		Third party(ies)	
Year	No.	%	No.	%	No.	%
2020	8,944	30.22%	6,665	22.52%	13,990	47.27%
2020	12,596	67.66%	6,020	32.34%	0	0.00%
2022	14,858	63.31%	8,195	34.92%	416	1.77%
2022	13,561	63.58%	7,767	36.42%	0	0.00%

Georgia Gubernatorial election results for Bulloch County
Year	Republican		Democratic		Third party(ies)	
Year	No.	%	No.	%	No.	%
2022	16,067	68.11%	7,352	31.16%	172	0.73%

== See also ==
- National Register of Historic Places listings in Bulloch County, Georgia
- USS Bulloch County (LST-509)
- List of counties in Georgia
