= Special routes of U.S. Route 301 =

A list of routes of U.S. Route 301

Special routes of U.S. Route 301

Highway system
- United States Numbered Highway System; List; Special; Divided

A total of at least seven special routes of U.S. Route 301 exist and at least eleven have been deleted.

== Existing ==
=== Starke alternate route ===
U.S. Highway 301 Alternate
- Location: Starke, Florida
- Length: 6.5 mi (10.5 km)
- Existed: 2019–present

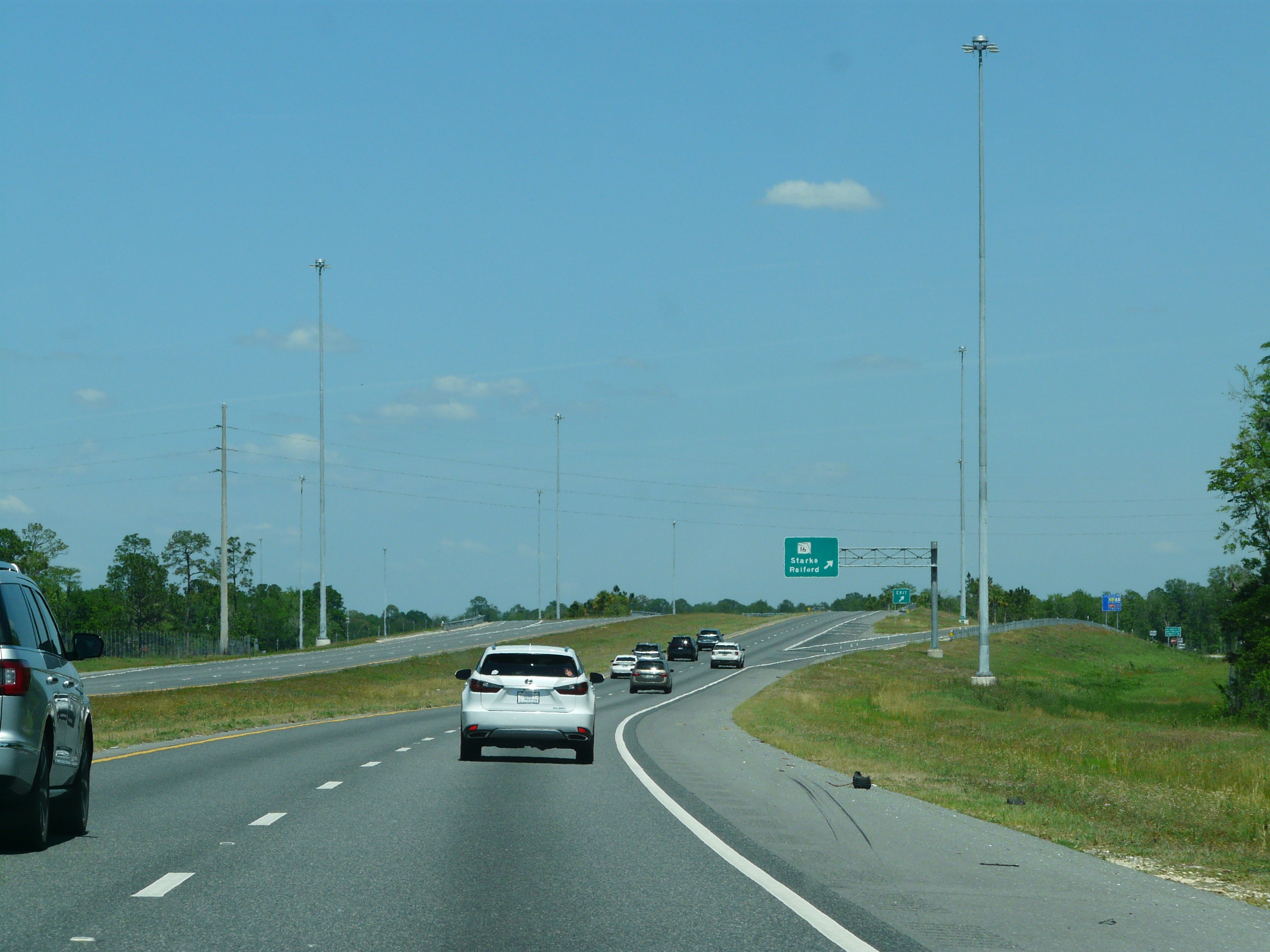
View north on US 301 Alternate at SR 16

U.S. Route 301 Alternate (US 301 Alt.) is a 6.5-mile-long (10.5 km) alternate route of US 301. It was established in 2019, and serves as a bypass of the mainline through downtown Starke. It is also designated as the main truck route for traffic headed north towards Jacksonville. The highway is built to freeway standards, with only two interchanges with State Road 100 (SR 100) and SR 16. It carries the hidden Florida Department of Transportation designation of State Road 223.

The entire route is in Bradford County.

Location	mi	km	Destinations	Notes
	0.000	0.000	US 301 (SR 200) – Downtown Starke, Gainesville	Southern terminus
Starke	2.089	3.362	SR 100 (West Madison Street) – Starke, Lake Butler	Interchange
Starke	4.275	6.880	SR 16 (San Carlos Avenue) – Starke, Raiford	Interchange
	6.489	10.443	US 301 (SR 200) – Downtown Starke, Jacksonville	Northern terminus
1.000 mi = 1.609 km; 1.000 km = 0.621 mi

=== Baldwin Bypass ===
U.S. Highway 301 Bypass
- Location: Baldwin, Florida
- Length: 3.933 mi (6.330 km)
- Existed: 2020–present

U.S. Route 301 By-Pass (US 301 Byp.) is a 3.933-mile-long (6.330 km) bypass of mainline US 301. It was established in September 2020, and bypasses the main road west of downtown Baldwin which also briefly overlaps US 90. It is also designated as the main truck route for traffic headed north towards Callahan. The highway is built to freeway standards, although unlike the Starke Bypass (see above) it contains no interchanges, and only has intersections with its parent route and US 90.

U.S. Route 301 By-Pass contains bridges over the Florida Gulf & Atlantic Railroad (formerly the CSX Tallahassee Subdivision), the Jacksonville-Baldwin Rail Trail and the CSX Callahan Subdivision. The route carries the hidden Florida Department of Transportation designation of State Road 201, and is the third route to bear this designation.

=== Statesboro bypass ===
U.S. Highway 301 Bypass
- Location: Statesboro, Georgia
- Length: 6.9 mi (11.1 km)
- Existed: 1993–present

U.S. Route 301 Bypass (US 301 Byp.), which is entirely concurrent with the unsigned State Route 73 Bypass (SR 73 Byp.), is a four-lane bypass of US 301. It travels south-to-north in the southern and eastern parts of the city of Statesboro. US 301 Byp., along with US 25 Byp. and SR 67 Byp., makes up the Veterans Memorial Parkway, which forms a near circle around the city.

The bypass begins in the southwestern part of the city at the intersection with US 25/US 301/SR 73, as well as US 25 Byp./SR 67 Byp. US 301 Byp., SR 67 Byp., and SR 73 Byp. travel southeast and east along the perimeter of Georgia Southern University. They follow the perimeter of the university, turning northeast towards Fair Road (SR 67), where it breaks off from the university perimeter and turns northward. Here, SR 67 Byp. ends, while US 301 Byp. and SR 73 Byp. continue. After turning north, the bypass intersects Northside Drive (US 80/SR 26), East Main Street (SR 24), and finally East Parrish Street (US 301/SR 73).

The entire length of US 301 Byp. and SR 73 Byp. is part of the National Highway System, a system of routes determined to be the most important for the nation's economy, mobility, and defense.

The Veterans Memorial Parkway was commissioned in 1993. Both US 25 Byp. and US 301 Byp. were completed at the same time as two-lane highways. Several years later, US 25 Byp. was widened to become a four-lane divided highway. In March 2007, work began on the widening of US 301 Byp. The bypass was completed in October 2008.

US 301 Byp., commonly referred to simply as "the bypass", has become one of the most congested roads in Statesboro. The widening of the road, which was supposed to be completed by 2006, was not completed due to a faulty contractor. A new contractor was hired by the Georgia Department of Transportation, and work began in March 2007. The bypass has become an attractive place for new businesses, and has been crucial in the growth and expansion of the greater Statesboro area.

The entire route is in Statesboro, Bulloch County.

mi	km	Destinations	Notes
0.0	0.0	US 25 / US 301 / SR 73 / US 25 Byp. north / SR 67 Byp. north (Veterans Memorial Parkway / SR 73 Byp. begins) to I-16 – Claxton, Statesboro, Millen, Historic Downtown Statesboro, Averitt Arts Center, East Georgia State College, Ogeechee Tech	Southern end of SR 67 Byp. and SR 73 Byp. concurrencies; southern terminus of US 25 Byp., US 301 Byp., and SR 73 Byp.
2.3	3.7	SR 67 (Fair Road) – Pembroke, Statesboro	Northern end of SR 67 Byp. concurrency; northern terminus of SR 67 Byp.; provides access to East Georgia Regional Medical Center
4.4	7.1	US 80 / SR 26 (Northside Drive) – Statesboro, Savannah	
5.8	9.3	SR 24 (East Main Street) – Statesboro, Oliver	
6.9	11.1	US 301 / SR 73 (East Parrish Street) – Statesboro, Sylvania, Historic Downtown Statesboro, Averitt Arts Center	Northern end of SR 73 Byp. concurrency; northern terminus of US 301 Byp. and SR 73 Byp.
1.000 mi = 1.609 km; 1.000 km = 0.621 mi: Concurrency terminus

=== Alcolu connector route 1 ===
U.S. Highway 301 Connector
- Location: Alcolu, South Carolina
- Length: 0.410 mi (660 m)

U.S. Route 301 Connector (US 301 Conn.) is a 0.410-mile (0.660 km) connector route of US 301 that connects US 521 at its interchange with Interstate 95 (I-95) with another US 301 Conn. (Spigner Road / Main Street). It shares the Main Street name with the other connector route and is an unsigned highway.

=== Alcolu connector route 2 ===
U.S. Highway 301 Connector
- Location: Alcolu, South Carolina
- Length: 2.470 mi (3.975 km)

U.S. Route 301 Connector (US 301 Conn.) is a 2.470-mile (3.975 km) connector route of US 301 that connects US 301 just southeast of Alcolu with US 521 in the far northwestern part of the community. Besides its termini, the only other major intersection is one with the northern terminus of another US 301 Conn. (Main Street). It is part of Trinity Church Road, Spigner Road, and Main Street, the latter of which it shares with the other connector route. It is an unsigned highway.

=== Florence truck route ===
U.S. Highway 301 Truck
- Location: Florence, South Carolina

=== Rocky Mount business loop ===
U.S. Highway 301 Business
- Location: Rocky Mount, North Carolina
- Length: 7.5 mi (12.1 km)
- Existed: 1960–present

U.S. Route 301 Business was established in 1960 as a renumbering of US 301A through downtown Rocky Mount, via Church Street and briefly on Tarboro Road.

=== Halifax business loop ===
U.S. Highway 301 Business
- Location: Halifax, North Carolina
- Length: 1.1 mi (1.8 km)
- Existed: 1960–present

U.S. Route 301 Business was established in 1960 as a renumbering of US 301A through downtown Halifax, via King and Saint David Streets.

=== Petersburg alternate route ===
U.S. Route 301 Alternate
- Location: Petersburg, Virginia
- Length: 2.7 mi (4.3 km)
- Existed: 1950–present

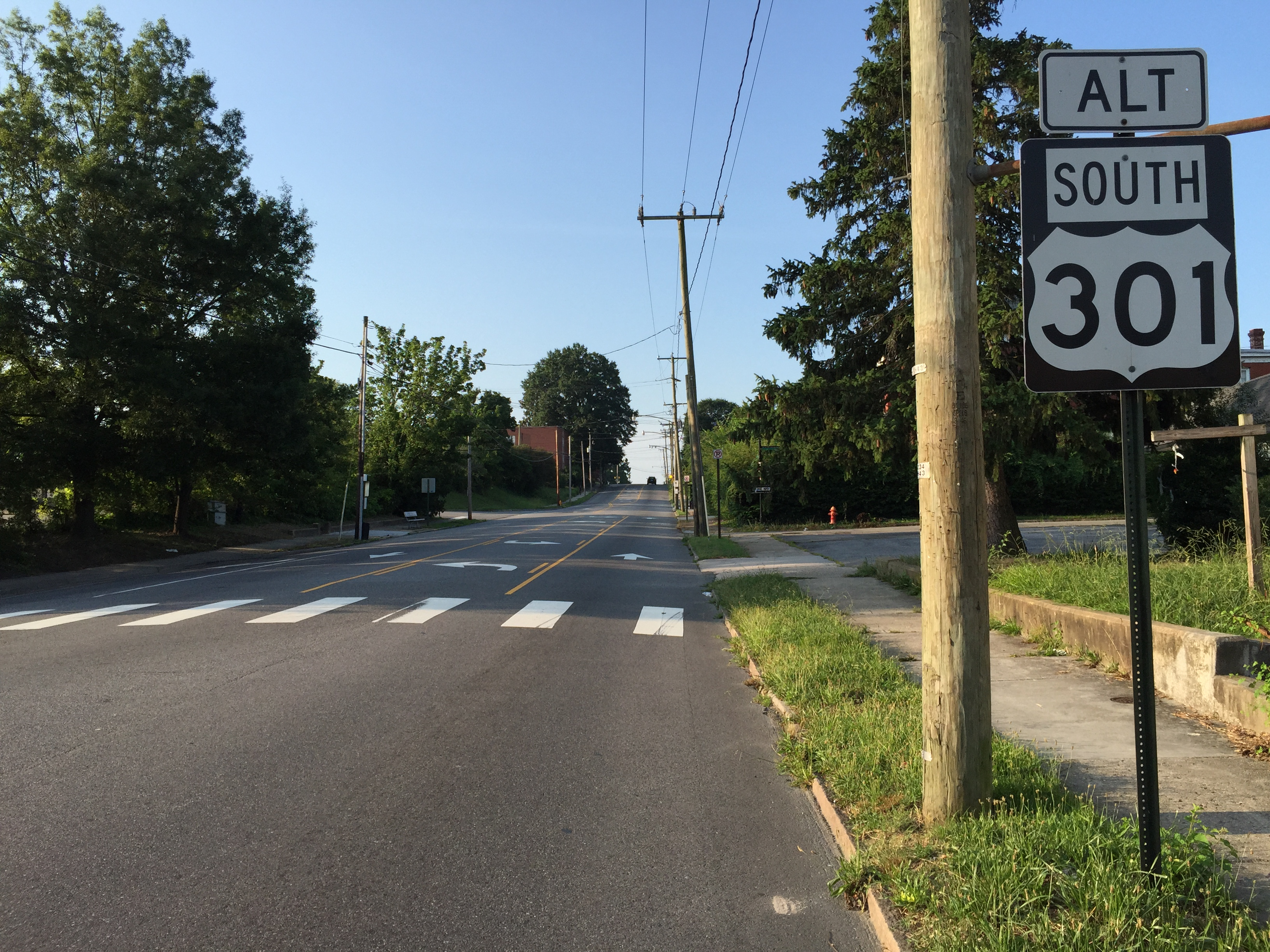
View south along US 301 Alt. in Petersburg

U.S. Route 301 Alternate is an alternate route of US 301 through Petersburg, mostly running along South Sycamore Street. It begins at a three-way intersection from Crater Road (US 301) and Walnut Boulevard which veers diagonal to the left as Sycamore Street. Before reaching downtown Petersburg, US Alt. 301 crosses Interstate 85/US 460 with no access. In the downtown area, it joins northbound US 1, eastbound Business US 460 and SR 36 on a concurrency along Wythe Street while southbound US 301 Alt. uses Washington Street on a one-way pair. Alt. 301 turns left onto Adams Street along with US 1 and ending at Bank/Bollingbrook Streets (US 301).

=== Bowling Green business loop ===
U.S. Route 301 Business
- Location: Bowling Green, Virginia
- Length: 1.7 mi (2.7 km)
- Existed: 1970–present

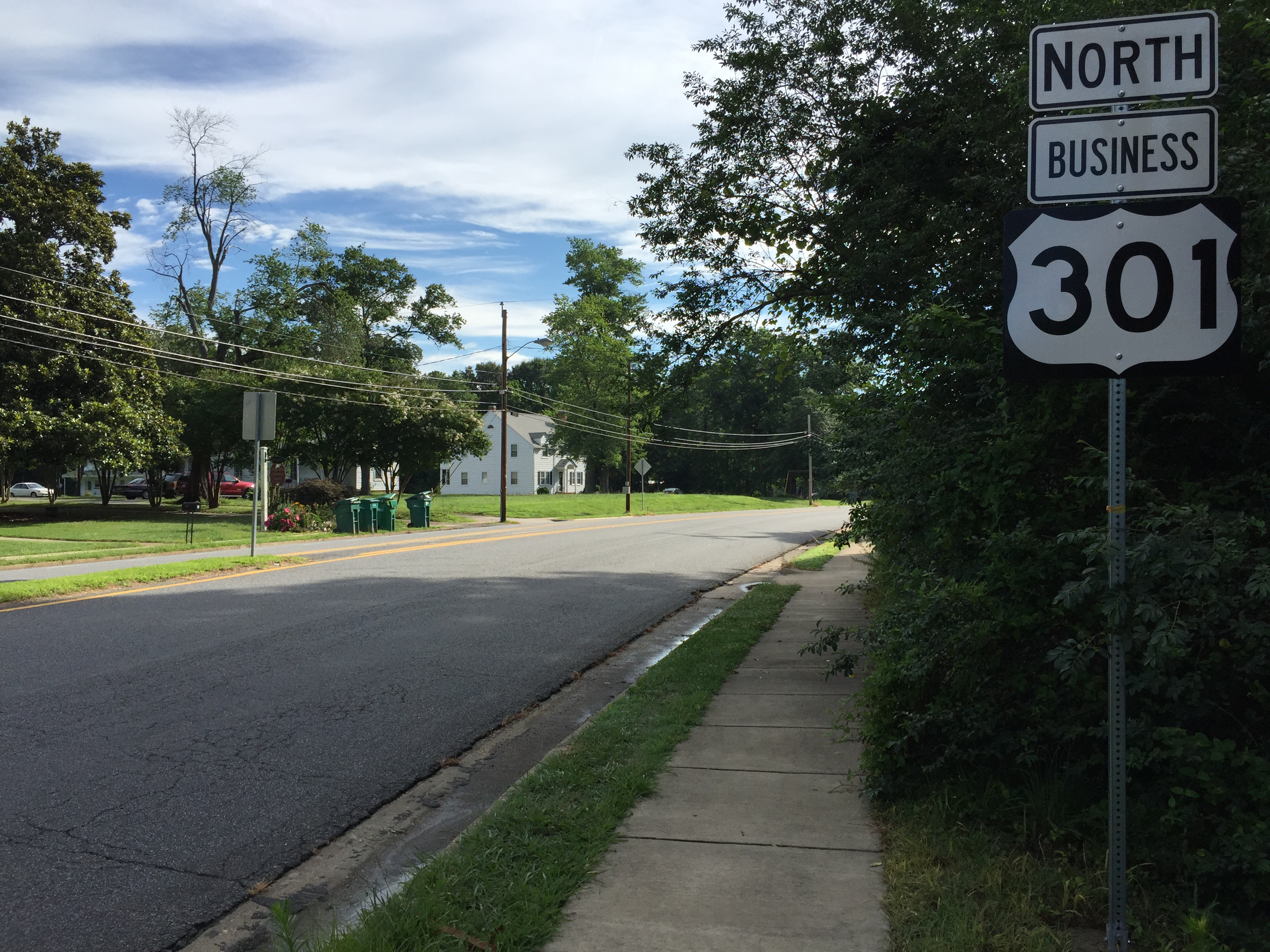
US 301 Bus. northbound at SR 2 and SR 207 Bus. in Bowling Green

U.S. Route 301 Business was established in 1970, it replaced the old mainline US 301 through downtown Bowling Green, via Richmond Turnpike, Main Street, and Broaddus Avenue. The route begins at an interchange with the Bowling Green Bypass (US 301) at a single connecting road, where Richmond Turnpike becomes South Main Street. VA 2 continues from the overlap with mainline US 301 to an overlap with the business loop. At the intersection of Milford and Chase Streets (VSR 619), South Main Street becomes North Main Street, which runs through the Bowling Green Historic District. North Main Street makes a slight northwest curve at the intersection with Sunset Drive. The intersection of West and East Broaddus Avenues is where US BUS 301 makes a right turn while VA 2 continues north towards Fredericksburg, and VA BUS 207 heads west to VA 207. US BUS 301 heads east along East Broaddus as it runs from a residential to a sparsely commercial developed area until it curves to the southeast and finally terminates at US 301, the northern terminus of the Bowling Green Bypass at A.P. Hill Boulevard.

== Former ==
=== Dade City truck route ===
U.S. Highway 301 Truck
- Location: Dade City, Florida
- Existed: 1980s–2007

Truck U.S. Route 98-301 was a truck bypass of the concurrency of U.S. Routes 98 & 301 in Dade City, Florida. The road is also unsigned State Road 533. In February 2007, this section was converted into the main branch of the US 98-301 concurrency.

=== Dade City business route ===
U.S. Highway 301 Business
- Location: Dade City
- Existed: 1980s–2007

Business U.S. Route 98-301 was the main line of the concurrency of U.S. Routes 98 & 301 in Dade City, Florida until February 2007. The road was also unsigned State Road 35, State Road 39, and State Road 700. SR 39 shields turned up during an FDOT resurfacing project of the former route.

=== Ocala alternate route ===
U.S. Highway 301 Alternate
- Location: Ocala-Citra, Florida
- Existed: 1970s–1981

U.S. Route 301 Alternate in Ocala is now County Road 200A. It was also former State Road 200A. The first segment is named 20th Street and begins at US 301 in Ocala north of a railroad bridge. Upon reaching Northeast Eighth Road, former US ALT 301 becomes Jacksonville Road, a street name it carries until it terminates with US 301 in Citra.

=== Sylvania business loop ===
U.S. Highway 301 Business
- Location: Sylvania, Georgia
- Existed: 1970–2017

U.S. Route 301 Business (US 301 Bus.), the one segment of SR 73 that's not concurrent with US 301, was a business route of US 301. It began at the US 301/SR 21/SR 73 Loop bypass around western Sylvania. The highway, which was named West Ogeechee Street curved northeast in front of a former segment of the road which also leads to a former segment of SR 21, then passes\d the northbound frontage road for the Sylvania Bypass. It traveled straight northeast and southwest along random commercial development until it curved to the east and encountered the intersection of SR 21 Bus. (Mims Road) with turning ramps at both the northwest and northeast corners. The SR 21 Bus./SR 73 concurrency begins and the two highways travel to the east for just over 2,000 feet (610 m), part of which uses a bridge over a railroad line.

The road divided before approaching Main Street and City Hall, where SR 21 Bus. turns south on South Main Street, while SR 73 turns north on North Main Street. Main Street itself is divided by a town green from Telephone Avenue to halfway between Ogeechee Street and W.T. Sharpe Drive, while East Ogeechee Street becomes an unmarked city street. After the intersection with W.T. Sharpe Drive, SR 73 branches off to the northeast, while Singleton Avenue branches off to the northwest. North Main Street becomes much more rural north of here, and is sparsely lined with large suburban houses, although one local lawn mower dealership can be found on the southwest corner of SR 73 and Habersham Road across from Torrington Road. Two more local intersections are passed before the route encounters the frontage the Sylvania Bypass once again, and SR 73 rejoins US 301 on its way to South Carolina, while SR 73 Loop ends.

When SR 73 Loop was established in 1970, US 301 was routed onto it. US 301's former path through the city (on SR 73) was redesignated as US 301 Bus. In 2017, it was decommissioned.

=== Lumberton alternate route ===
U.S. Highway 301A
- Location: Lumberton, North Carolina
- Existed: 1954–1960

U.S. Route 301 Alternate (US 301A) was established around 1954, it replaced the old mainline US 301 through downtown Lumberton, via Second Street and Pine Street. In 1960 it was renumbered to US 301 Business.

=== Lumberton business loop ===
U.S. Highway 301 Business
- Location: Lumberton, North Carolina
- Existed: 1960–1971

U.S. Route 301 Business was established in 1960 as a renumbering of US 301A through downtown Lumberton, via Second Street and Pine Street. Sometime in April 1971, it was decommissioned, leaving NC 42 and NC 72.

=== Fayetteville alternate route ===
U.S. Highway 301A
- Location: Fayetteville, North Carolina
- Existed: 1952–1960

U.S. Route 301 Alternate (US 301A) was established around 1952, it replaced the old mainline US 301 through downtown Fayetteville, via Gillespie Street and Clinton Road. In 1960 it was renumbered to US 301 Business.

=== Fayetteville business loop ===
U.S. Highway 301 Business
- Location: Fayetteville, North Carolina
- Existed: 1960–1975

U.S. Route 301 Business was established in 1960 as a renumbering of US 301A through downtown Fayetteville, via Gillespie Street and Clinton Road. In January 1975, it was decommissioned.

=== Wilson alternate route ===
U.S. Highway 301A
- Location: Wilson, North Carolina
- Existed: 1957–1960

U.S. Route 301 Alternate (US 301A) was established around 1954, it replaced the old mainline US 301 through downtown Wilson, via Goldsboro Street and Herring Avenue. In 1960 it was renumbered to US 301 Business.

=== Wilson business loop ===
U.S. Highway 301 Business
- Location: Wilson, North Carolina
- Existed: 1960–1963

U.S. Route 301 Business was established in 1960 as a renumbering of US 301A through downtown Wilson, via Goldsboro Street and Herring Avenue. In 1963 it was decommissioned; partly replaced by NC 42 along Herring Avenue.

=== Elm City business loop ===
U.S. Highway 301 Business
- Location: Elm City, North Carolina
- Length: 3.0 mi (4.8 km)
- Existed: 1960–1970

U.S. Route 301 Business was established in 1960 and followed the old mainline route of US 301 through Elm City, via Elm City Road, before its bypass was built in 1958. In November 1970, it was decommissioned.

=== Rocky Mount alternate route ===
U.S. Highway 301A
- Location: Rocky Mount, North Carolina
- Existed: 1954–1960

U.S. Route 301 Alternate (US 301A) was established around 1954, it replaced the old mainline US 301 through downtown Rocky Mount, via Church Street. In 1960 it was renumbered to US 301 Business.

=== Halifax alternate route ===
U.S. Highway 301A
- Location: Halifax, North Carolina
- Length: 1.1 mi (1.8 km)
- Existed: 1952–1960

U.S. Route 301 Alternate (US 301A) was established around 1952, it replaced the old mainline US 301 through downtown Halifax, via King and David Streets. In 1960 it was renumbered to US 301 Business.

=== Delaware truck route ===
U.S. Route 301 Truck
- Location: Mount Pleasant-State Road, Delaware
- Length: 15.02 mi (24.17 km)
- Existed: 1980s–2001

U.S. Route 301 Truck was a truck bypass of a segment of U.S. Route 301 in New Castle County, Delaware. It was created in the 1980s to provide a truck bypass of the St. Georges Bridge for US 301 when structural issues with the bridge forced a weight restriction. U.S. Route 301 Truck followed Delaware Route 71 and Delaware Route 896 north from US 301 in Mount Pleasant. It then crossed over the Chesapeake & Delaware Canal on the Summit Bridge. The truck route continued north on DE 896 to Glasgow, where it turned east on U.S. Route 40 and followed it to State Road, where it ended at U.S. Route 13 and U.S. Route 301. In 1992, US 301 was realigned to head north over the Summit Bridge to end at US 40 in Glasgow. This rerouting made Truck US 301 obsolete, however signs remained until 2001 along US 40.
