= Adabelle, Georgia =

Unincorporated community in Georgia, U.S.

Adabelle
- unincorporated community
- Interactive map of Adabelle
- Coordinates: 32°17′30″N 81°55′37″W
- Country: United States
- State: Georgia
- County: Bulloch

Adabelle is an unincorporated community in Bulloch County, in the U.S. state of Georgia.

== History ==
A post office called Adabelle was established in 1900, and remained in operation until 1907. In 1900, Adabelle had about 85 inhabitants.
