= Interstate 520 =

Interstate Highway in Georgia and South Carolina

Interstate 520
- I-520 highlighted in red

Route information
- Auxiliary route of I-20
- Length: 23.34 mi (37.56 km)
- Existed: 1977–present
- NHS: Entire route

Major junctions
- West end: I-20 / SR 232 in Augusta, GA
- US 78 / US 278 / SR 10 in Augusta, GA; US 1 / SR 4 / SR 540 in Augusta, GA; US 25 / SR 121 / SR 555 / SR 565 in Augusta, GA; US 1 / US 78 / US 278 in North Augusta, SC
- East end: I-20 in North Augusta, SC

Location
- Country: United States
- States: Georgia, South Carolina
- Counties: GA: Richmond; SC: Aiken

Highway system
- Interstate Highway System; Main; Auxiliary; Suffixed; Business; Future
- Georgia State Highway System; Interstate; US; State; Special
- South Carolina State Highway System; Interstate; US; State; Scenic
← I-516	GA	→ SR 520
← SR 413	SR 415	→ SR 417
← SC 517	SC	→ US 521

Interstate 520 (I-520) is a 23.34-mile (37.56 km) auxiliary Interstate Highway that encircles most of Augusta, Georgia and North Augusta, South Carolina as a three-quarter beltway around the western, southern, and eastern parts of the main part of the Augusta metropolitan area. It begins at I-20 and State Route 232 (SR 232) in the northern part of Augusta, Georgia, and ends at I-20 in the northern part of North Augusta, South Carolina. I-520 is also known as Bobby Jones Expressway and the Deputy James D. Paugh Memorial Highway in Georgia and Palmetto Parkway in South Carolina. On the Georgia side, the road also carries the internal designation State Route 415 (SR 415).

== Route description ==
Lengths
	mi	km
GA	15.62	25.14
SC	7.72	12.42
Total	23.34	37.56

The entire length of I-520 is part of the National Highway System, a system of routes determined to be the most important for the nation's economy, mobility, and defense.

=== Georgia ===
I-520 begins at an interchange with I-20 (Carl Sanders Highway) and the internal designation of SR 402 in the northern part of Augusta. At this interchange, the roadway continues as SR 232, which takes on the Bobby Jones Expressway name. The Interstate travels to the south-southeast. After passing the Augusta Exchange shopping complex, east of Doctors Hospital, it has an interchange with Wheeler Road and Marks Church Road. After a slight western jog, I-520 continues to the south-southeast and meets Wrightsboro Road, which leads to Augusta Mall. About one mile (1.6 km) later is an interchange with U.S. Route 78 (US 78)/US 278/SR 10 (Gordon Highway). The freeway curves to the southeast, passing by Glenn Hills Middle School and Glenn Hills High School, to an interchange with US 1/SR 4 (Deans Bridge Road) and SR 540 (Fall Line Freeway). It passes by a campus of Augusta Technical College and the Richmond County Technical Career Magnet School, before curving to the east-southeast and meeting an interchange with Windsor Spring Road also with US 25/SR 121 (Peach Orchard Road) and SR 555/SR 565 (Savannah River Parkway). After a curve to the east is an interchange with SR 56 (Mike Padgett Highway), which is east of Southside Elementary School and northeast of East-Central Regional Hospital. I-520 curves to the east-northeast and has an interchange with Doug Barnard Parkway (former State Route 56 Spur (SR 56 Spur)). The Interstate gradually curves to the northeast and has an interchange with Laney Walker Boulevard and SR 28 (Sand Bar Ferry Road). Just over 1,000 feet (300 m) later, it crosses the Savannah River into South Carolina and the city limits of North Augusta.

=== South Carolina ===
I-520 curves to the north-northwest, to an interchange with US 1/US 78/US 278 (only signed as "US 1"). The highway curves back to the north-northeast and has an interchange with South Carolina Highway 126 (SC 126; Clearwater Road). During a slight westward shift is an interchange with US 25/SC 121 (Edgefield Road). Just north-northeast of there, I-520 meets its eastern terminus, another interchange with I-20.

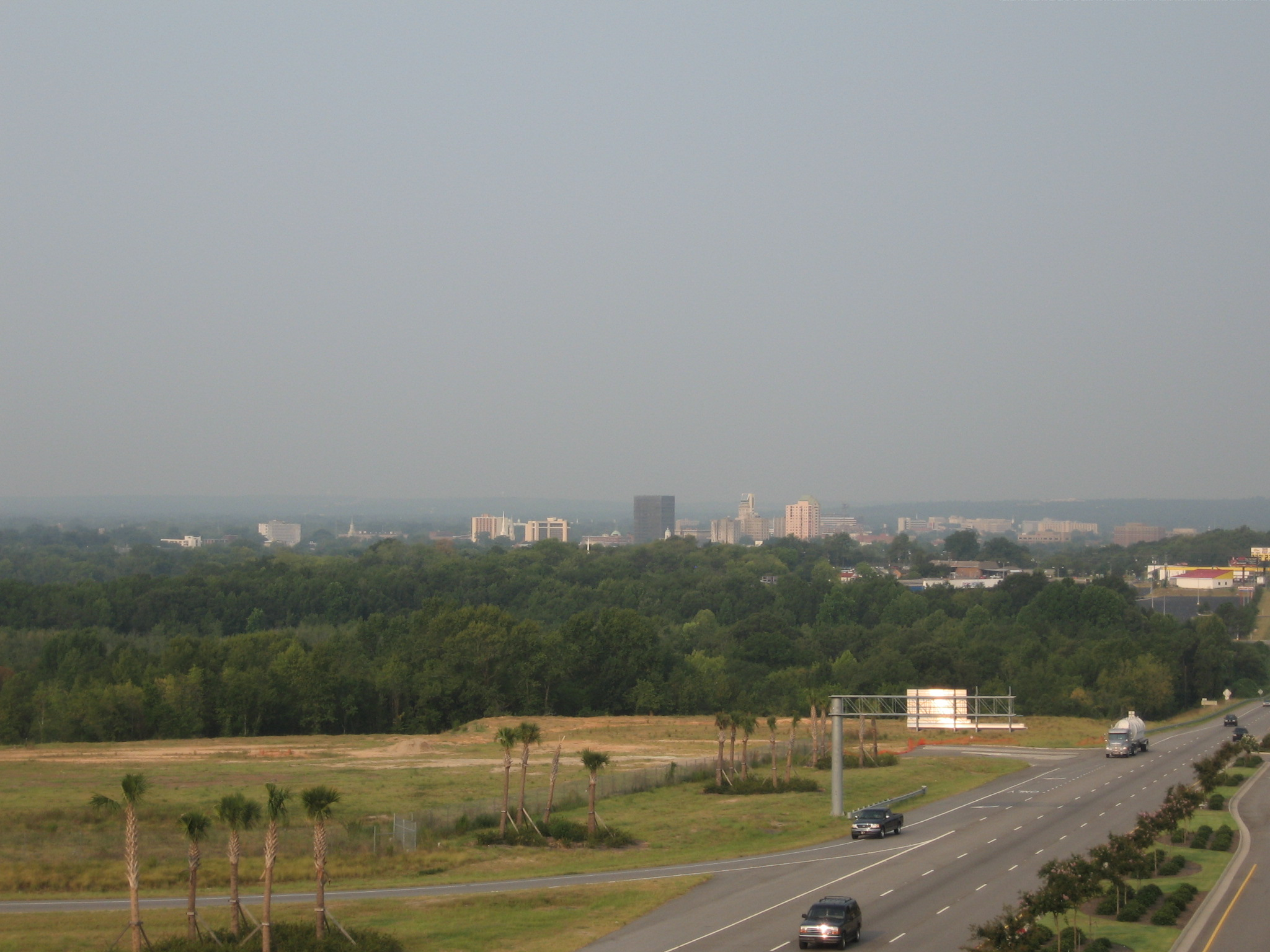
Downtown Augusta skyline as seen from the US 1 exit in North Augusta (exit 17)

=== Named portions ===
In Georgia, I-520 is known as Bobby Jones Expressway for golfer Bobby Jones. In South Carolina, it is known as Palmetto Parkway for the sabal palmetto, the state tree. Between exits 2 and 3, the highway is known as the Deputy James D. Paugh Memorial Highway after a Richmond County sheriff's deputy who was killed at exit 3 when responding to reports of a gunman who was shooting at passing cars. I-520 loses its state route designation in South Carolina, as that state does not co-number its Interstates with state highway numbers.

== History ==
The highway that would become I-520 was under construction between May 1963 and January 1966 from its western terminus to just south of the US 1/SR 4 interchange in Augusta. Also, it was proposed to be an extension of SR 232, at least as far as US 25/SR 121. In 1966, the highway was open and signed as SR 232 from I-20 to Wrightsboro Road. It was under construction from US 1/SR 4 to Doug Barnard Parkway. In 1974, SR 232 was open from Wrightsboro Road to US 1/SR 4. In 1977, the highway was redesignated as I-520. The next year, it was open from US 1/SR 4 to Doug Barnard Parkway. In 1986, the highway was under construction from Doug Barnard Parkway to SR 28. In 1998, this segment was opened. The next year, it was proposed to be extended to the South Carolina state line. In 2004, this extension was opened. In 2010, the highway was extended to its current eastern terminus in the northern part of North Augusta.

In January 2015, 4.7 miles (7.6 km) of I-520 were expanded to three lanes in each direction after work started in February 2012 for a cost of $33 million.

== Exit list ==
In accordance with MUTCD guidelines for auxiliary Interstates, exit numbering is continuous across the state line and does not reset.

State	County	Location	mi	km	Exit	Destinations	Notes
Georgia	Richmond	Augusta	0.0	0.0	1	I-20 (Carl Sanders Highway / SR 402) / SR 232 west (Bobby Jones Expressway west) – Atlanta, Columbia, Martinez	Western end of unsigned SR 415 concurrency; western terminus of I-520 and unsigned SR 415; eastern terminus of SR 232; signed as exits 1A (west) and 1B (east) eastbound; SR 232 takes on the Bobby Jones Expressway name; I-20 exit 196
Georgia	Richmond	Augusta	0.4	0.64	1C	Wheeler Road	Westbound ramps connect to Marks Church Road.
Georgia	Richmond	Augusta	1.9	3.1	2	Wrightsboro Road – Daniel Field, Augusta University, Paine College	
Georgia	Richmond	Augusta	3.1	5.0	3	US 78 / US 278 / SR 10 (Gordon Highway) – Fort Gordon	Deputy James D. Paugh Memorial Interchange
Georgia	Richmond	Augusta	5.3	8.5	5	US 1 / SR 4 (Deans Bridge Road) / SR 540 west (Fall Line Freeway) – Wrens, Augusta	Eastern terminus of SR 540 (Fall Line Freeway); Henry L. Howard Memorial Interchange
Georgia	Richmond	Augusta	7.2	11.6	7	US 25 (Peach Orchard Road / SR 121 / Savannah River Parkway / SR 555 / SR 565) / Windsor Spring Road	Split diamond interchange
Georgia	Richmond	Augusta	8.7	14.0	9	SR 56 (Mike Padgett Highway)	
Georgia	Richmond	Augusta	9.9	15.9	10	Doug Barnard Parkway – Augusta Regional Airport	Former SR 56 Spur
Georgia	Richmond	Augusta	14.5	23.3	16	SR 28 (Sand Bar Ferry Road) / Laney Walker Boulevard – Fairgrounds	Split diamond interchange
Savannah River			15.62	25.14	Georgia–South Carolina state line; eastern end of unsigned SR 415 concurrency; eastern terminus of SR 415 and Bobby Jones Expressway; western terminus of Palmetto Parkway		
South Carolina	Aiken	North Augusta	17.41	28.02	17	US 1 (Jefferson Davis Highway / US 78 / US 278) – Aiken, North Augusta	
South Carolina	Aiken	North Augusta	20.60	33.15	21	SC 126 (Clearwater Road)	
South Carolina	Aiken	North Augusta	22.21	35.74	22	US 25 Conn. to US 25 / SC 121 – North Augusta, Edgefield	
South Carolina	Aiken	North Augusta	23.34	37.56	—	I-20 (J. Strom Thurmond Freeway) – Atlanta, Columbia	Eastern terminus of I-520 and Palmetto Parkway; eastbound exit and westbound entrance; I-20 exit 6
1.000 mi = 1.609 km; 1.000 km = 0.621 mi: Concurrency terminus
