= Denmark, Georgia =

Unincorporated community in Georgia, U.S.

Coordinates: 32°17′05″N 81°43′26″W

Denmark is an unincorporated community in Bulloch County, in the U.S. state of Georgia.

Population: The population in 2022 was estimated at 278 people.

== History ==
The community was named after a local family with the last name of Denmark.
