= U.S. Route 301 in Georgia =

Section of U.S. Highway

U.S. Highway 301
- US 301 highlighted in red

Route information
- Auxiliary route of US 1
- Maintained by GDOT
- Length: 169.4 mi (272.6 km)
- Existed: 1948–present

Major junctions
- South end: US 1 / US 23 / US 301 / SR 15 / SR 4 at the Florida state line near Folkston
- US 1 / US 23 / SR 4 / SR 15 / SR 121 in Homeland; US 82 / SR 520 in Nahunta; US 25 / US 341 / SR 27 in Jesup; US 84 / SR 38 from Jesup to Ludowici; I-16 near Register; US 25 / US 80 / SR 26 / SR 67 in Statesboro
- North end: US 301 / SR 73 at the South Carolina state line near Hiltonia

Location
- Country: United States
- State: Georgia
- Counties: Charlton, Brantley, Wayne, Long, Tattnall, Evans, Bulloch, Screven

Highway system
- United States Numbered Highway System; List; Special; Divided; Georgia State Highway System; Interstate; US; State; Special
← SR 300	→ SR 301

U.S. Route 301 (US 301) is a 169.4-mile-long (272.6 km) U.S. Highway in the U.S. state of Georgia. It travels south-to-north from the St. Marys River south-southeast of Folkston to the Savannah River north-northeast of Sylvania, via Folkston, Jesup, Ludowici, Glennville, Claxton, Statesboro, and Sylvania.

The highway is concurrent with various state highways in Georgia. It uses SR 4/SR 15 from the Florida state line to Homeland, SR 23 from Folkston to Glennville, SR 38 from Jesup to Ludowici, SR 57 from Ludowici to Glennville, SR 73 from Glennville to the South Carolina state line, and SR 73 Loop along the western edge of Sylvania. US 301 is concurrent with US 25 from Jesup to Statesboro.

== Route description ==
=== Florida State Line to Jesup ===
The route starts at the Florida state line on a bridge over the St. Marys River in eastern Charlton County, and initially travels north as a four-lane highway through Folkston, concurrent with US 1, US 23, and SR 4/SR 15. In Folkston, the highway intersects Main Street. One block later, the road intersects Love Street, and later is joined by SR 23/SR 121 where another concurrency begins. A 1.33 miles (2.14 km) connecting route begins along the east side to travel towards SR 40. In Homeland, US 1/US 23/SR 4/SR 15/SR 121 turns to the northwest at an interchange where it crosses into Ware County, while US 301/SR 23 heads north into northeastern Charlton County.

Throughout most of southern Georgia, US 301/SR 23 travels through rural Charlton county then crosses the Charlton–Brantley County line. US 301/SR 23 curves to the northeast after Taylor Bay Boulevard. In Hickox, the road curves back towards the north as it briefly widens to accommodate left turn lanes for Brantley CR 79. Before crossing this road, the right-of-way for a former segment begins on the southeast corner of this intersection and follows the existing road along the east side until it reaches the bridge over Buffalo Creek. The former section resumes after the bridge, and the road has right-turn lanes as it approaches a road named for the creek. North of Britt Still Road an unfinished frontage road can be found along the west side, approaching a trailer park and local church. Both sections end after this mobile home community.

A clear sign that the road is approaching Nahunta is a second southbound lane just south of Brantley CR 70 (Robin Lane). Within the city limits the road is named South Main Street. US 301/SR 23 heads north across US 82/SR 520. After this intersection, South Main Street becomes North Main Street. The road passes by the Nahunta City Hall, and Satilla Avenue. Continuing north, crosses a railroad track, and passes by the Hotel Knox, at Broome Street and Florida Avenue, a five-way intersection. The road leaves the city limits. It then gains a second northbound lane which ends just before the road enters Raybon. North of CR 102, The road crosses over a culvert leading from Strickland Lake before intersecting with Brantley CR 103. North of CR 103, a former segment of the road can be found at a local automotive repair shop, and is found again on the east side of the road south of the intersection with Brantley CR 299 (Laural Road). The right of way for this former segment remains on the right side, and is even used as a boat-launching area as US 301/SR 23 crosses a bridge over the Satilla River. After the bridge, the former section resumes on the same side. Traveling through Trudie. Shortly after this it crosses a bridge over the Little Satilla River, followed by another bridge over an overflow creek to the river. A second bridge over another overflow creek to the river can be found 0.5 miles (0.80 km) north of the first overflow bridge. The right-of-way for this former segment ends just after that second overflow bridge. After this bridge, the route enters Hortense. Intersecting with SR 32. Just north of the intersection, US 301/SR 23 crosses a power line right-of-way, and passes the intersection of a long dirt road named Old Hortense Road. Just after the intersection with Perry Rozier Road on the west side the routes cross the Brantley–Wayne County line and has an intersection with Loper–Bryan Road on the east side. North of the county line, the road is named Pine Street.

After the intersection with Ed Harrell Road and later some unnamed dirt roads, the route crosses over a bridge over Barbers Creek. An extra southbound lane forms and then comes to an end just before an intersection with an unnamed dirt road traveling northwest and southeast. After passing two unnamed dirt roads, US 301/SR 23 enters McKinnon and immediately intersects a dirt road, along with three other dirt roads. The routes also pass a cell phone tower just south of the intersection of Fire Tower Road. Shortly after this, US 301/SR 23 becomes Old Hortense Road. In Broadhurst the route encounters Broadhurst Road West which leads to Screven, and then Broadhurst Road East which leads to Gardi and Manningtown. After this, a second northbound lane appears momentarily and ends in another wooded area. After the bridge over Little Penholoway Creek, the road intersects Long Fork Road, which branches off to the northeast. Just before entering Jesup the routes pass by the Jesup-Wayne County Airport, and then the Pine Forest Country Club. In the city itself, US 301/SR 23 crosses US 341/SR 27, where northbound US 25 turns from US 341 onto US 301/SR 23, and then travels over a bridge. The three highways travel to the north-northeast in the northeast part of the city. They curve to the north, approaching a bridge, then merges with US 84/SR 38 at a partial wye interchange. Immediately afterward, the five highways travel to the northeast and leave the city limits. The concurrency travels through rural parts of the county, passing the Jesup Drive-In, and then a Rayonier Performance Fibres plant near Doctortown, curving to the north, then crossing over the Altamaha River into Long County on the Dr. J. Alvin Leaphart Sr. Memorial Bridge.

=== Concurrency with US 25 ===
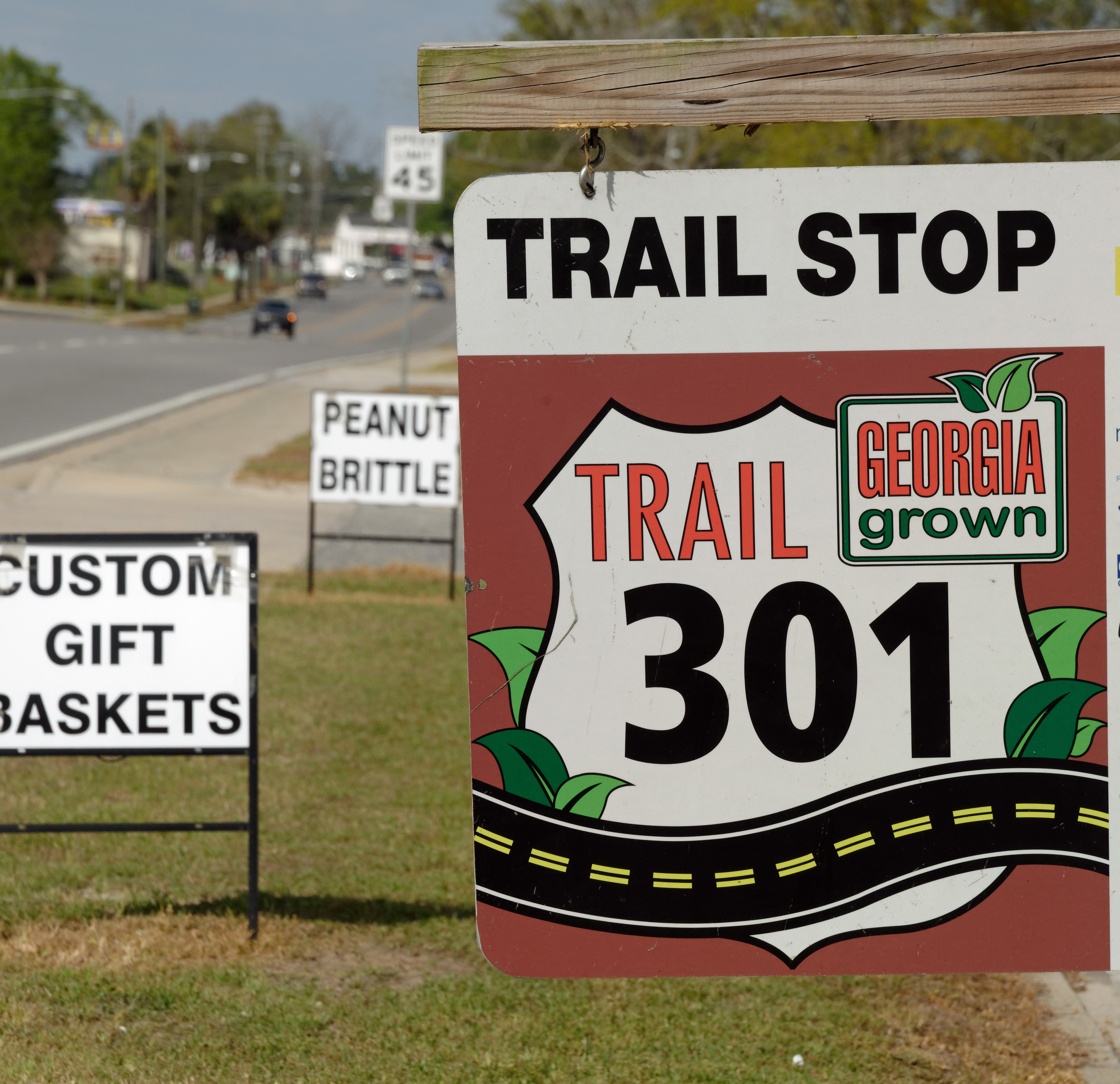
Sign along US 301 in Glenville, Georgia - agribusiness trail

The combined routes (US 25/US 84/US 301/SR 23/SR 38) continue to the northeast and travel through rural areas of the county, crossing over tributaries of the Altamaha River such as Forrest Pond, Back Swamp (in two places), Corker Branch, Fountain Branch, Brickyard Branch, and Jones Creek on its way to Ludowici. In town, the concurrency intersects SR 57 south, which travels to the southeast. At this intersection, US 25/US 301/SR 23, as well as SR 57 north, travel to the northwest in a new concurrency, while US 84/SR 38 continue to the northeast. This segment of the highway is named North McDonald Street until roughly around Macon Darien Road where it becomes Cecil Nobles Highway. After a slight jog more towards the northwest, the roadway crosses through Wefanie. Just before leaving the county, they intersect the southwest terminus of former SR 261, today known as Marcus Nobles Road. Right after that, they curve to the north-northwest and cross over Beards Creek into Tattnall County.

US 25/US 301/SR 23/SR 57 travel to the east of Kicklighters Pond. In Glennville, the concurrency makes its strongest effort to move from northwest to northeast at the intersection of SR 196. However, only in "downtown" Glennville does SR 23/SR 57 split off to the northwest at the intersection of SR 144. SR 73 begins there, taking US 25/US 301 north from Glenville. Within the city, the road travels through a diagonal intersection with Hencart Road, a local street that leads northeast and southwest to the western end of the SR 23/SR 57/SR 144 concurrency. Just after leaving the city limits, the highways pass the Georgia Veterans Memorial Cemetery – Glennville, Stricklands Pond, and Strickland Pond Dam. After passing a bridge over Chapel Creek, the concurrency travels along the west side of Smith State Prison, where it begins to curve to the north. They curve to the north-northwest at Tattnall CR 403 and CR 374, then back to the north-northeast and cross over Beards Creek just before intersecting the southern terminus of what used to be SR 250. After passing to the east of Durrence Pond, just west of Midway, US 25/US 301/SR 73 crosses into Evans County.

The concurrency passes to the east of Union Cemetery and then to the west of Evans Heights Golf Club. Approximately 2,000 feet (610 m) later, it crosses over Bull Creek. After a westward jog past Richards Pond, the highways curve to a due north routing and where it travels between the Claxton Elementary School and a local storage facility before entering Claxton. In downtown, the roads pass by The Georgia Fruitcake Company then cross a railroad line right before the intersection with US 280/SR 30/SR 129 (Main Street). Just after the intersection of Martin Luther King Jr. Drive/East Long Street, the highways curve to the northeast. Just northeast of the city limits, US 25/US 301/SR 73 passes southeast of the Claxton Sewage Treatment Pond and the accompanying dam. About 2,000 feet (610 m) later, they cross over the Canoochee River on the Claxton Bridge. They provide access to the Claxton–Evans County Airport and then curve to the north-northwest. After curving back to the north-northeast, the highways curve to a due north routing and intersect the northern terminus of SR 169. About 1 mile (1.6 km) later, they cross into Bulloch County.

=== Statesboro to the South Carolina state line ===
Almost immediately, the three highways curve to the north-northwest, passing Ephesus Cemetery, and curve back to the north-northeast and pass by Nevils Pond and Nevils Pond Dam. They again curve to the north-northwest and the road widens to four lanes, becoming a divided highway. Because after the intersection with Bulloch CR 190 the road approaches the real reason for the widening, which is the interchange with I-16 (Exit 116), also known as the Jim Gillis Historic Savannah Parkway. US 25/US 301/SR 73 curved to a nearly due north routing briefly before curving to the northeast and intersect SR 46, southeast of Register, just before crossing over Lotts Creek. North of SR 46 the divider comes to an end, but US 25/US 301/SR 73 remains a four-lane highway with provisions for left turn lanes. The highways pass Riggs Lake and Riggs Lake Dam. Later on, they travel through Jimps, just before passing a campus of Ogeechee Technical College. The routes officially enter Statesboro just south of the intersection with Veterans Memorial Parkway (Statesboro, Georgia), where US 25 Bypass/SR 67 Bypass branches off to the left, and US 301 Bypass/SR 73 Bypass branches off to the right. North of the bypass, the routes travel along South Main Street which passes just to the west of Georgia Southern University and later cuts between the W. Jones Lane Memorial Park and Charles H. Henry Pines Nature preserve. Before this, a former section of US 25/US 301/SR 73 travels along the west side from Woodland Road cutting through the W. Jones Lane park and ending at the southwest corner of the intersection with Tillman Road. They curve to the north-northeast and cross over Little Lotts Creek, and later encounters a railroad crossing with two different railroad lines crossing each other at the intersection of Brannen Street immediately south of SR 67 (Fair Road) where another concurrency begins. Further downtown, US 25/US 301/SR 67/SR 73 travels through the edge of the South Main Street Residential Historic District. Beyond that district, other NRHP-listed sites include the John A. McDougald House now the Beaver House Restaurant, the William G. Raines House, now the Statesboro Inn, and the James Alonzo Brannen House which was moved from its original site, and now houses the Statesboro–Bulloch Chamber of Commerce. The road travels in front of the Dr. Madison Monroe Holland House which is across the street from the historic post office building before entering the South Main Street Historic District, which ends at unmarked West Main Street and East Main Street, where US 25/US 301/SR 67/SR 73 becomes North Main Street in front of the Bulloch County Courthouse on the northeast corner of North Main Street and East Main Street. The road enters the North Main Street Commercial Historic District until it reaches Courtland Street.

Still in downtown Statesboro, the routes curve to the north-northwest and meet US 80/SR 26 (Northside Drive East), where US 25/SR 67 splits from US 301/SR 73 to the west onto US 80/SR 26 (Northside Drive West), joining a concurrency with those routes instead. US 301/SR 73 continues north along North Main Street. Two blocks later, US 301/SR 73 leaves North Main Street and turns east onto East Parrish Street, but begins to curve to the northeast after passing a local Jehovah's Witnesses Temple. Along this curvature, a Southern States agricultural warehouse can be found where the route crosses one of the railroad lines that it crossed south of SR 26 a second time. The rest of the area contains random local commercially zoned properties until it reaches the Bulloch County Sheriff's Office and Correctional Facility, and then the northeast terminus of US 301 Bypass/SR 73 Bypass, where the road officially leaves the city. The road descends slightly along the landscape between some local businesses before crossing a bridge over Mill Creek, then curves towards the north, where it approaches offices for the Bulloch County Animal Shelter, a local Georgia Forestry Commission facility, and the Statesboro–Bulloch County Airport. Beyond Bulloch CR 450 (Randy Lowery Road), US 301/SR 73 narrows from three lanes to two, then passes between two farm fields, the one on the east side ending at an unfinished housing development on a dead end street named Thomas Village. North from there the route enters Clito, where it travels past an independent motel called the Mill Creek Lodge, and then passes the intersection of Kyle Sorrell Road, which has the Statesboro Mission Outreach Ministries on the southwest corner, and a gas station and convenience store on the northwest corner. After passing that and another convenience store across the street from it, the routes pass by the gateway to the Eagle Village Mobile Home Park, before approaching the blinker-light intersection with Clito Road where the Clito Baptist Church and cemetery can be found on the northwest corner. The rest of the surroundings consist of farms and forests, and almost all intersections are with local dirt roads, with the exception of Bulloch CR 473 (Brooks Hendrix Road). Further north, the only other paved road is on the opposite side, and is named Hope Baptist Church Road, a loop road named for the church of the same name. A power line right-of-way crosses US 301/SR 73 from southwest to northeast, and then travels parallel to the routes across the street from the Oak Hill manufactured home development. These power lines continue along the east side through another blinker-light intersection with Bulloch CR 474 (Old River Road North), which actually sets the gas station that would otherwise be on the northeast corner one lot to the east. Beyond that point, the power lines are obstructed by trees, and the routes descend as they approach a culvert over Lily Creek. US 301/SR 73 winds around another former segment as it approaches a bridge over the swamplands of the Ogeechee River, crossing over the former bridge on the east side, both of which enter Screven County.

The road immediately enters Dover with the name Statesboro Highway and after the first intersection within the county, crosses a bridge over a railroad line. Shortly it travels under a power line right-of-way, and then approaches a blinker-light intersection with the first major crossroad in Screven County; SR 17, although some maps indicate that this is actually in Cooperville. North of SR 17, the east side of the road is dominated by a run-down restaurant and motel, and the rest of the way north is flanked by wide right-of-ways on both sides. Around Simmons Branch Road, that right-of-way is occupied by a pond. North from Goloid, the road widens from two to four lanes between a loop road on the right side called Hillcrest Drive but mysteriously narrows back down to two lanes near Freemam Pond. From there it crosses the bridge over Ogeechee Creek. Various run-down local businesses can be found on both sides before the route enters the Sylvania City Line Right after the intersection of Waters Station Road, US 301/SR 73 becomes a divided highway flanked by a frontage road on the southbound side, before approaching the intersection of and south end of the concurrency with SR 21. Remnants of former sections of SR 21 and SR 73 can be seen on the east side of the northbound lanes as SR 73 (former US 301 Business) almost instantly leaves US 301 to enter downtown Sylvania, and is replaced by SR 73 Loop. Flanked by frontage roads on both sides despite lacking interchanges, the road curves from northwest to northeast before the at-grade interchange with Rocky Ford Road, then has another at-grade interchange with Millen Highway, where SR 21 leaves to the northwest and SR 21 Business ends. The road curves more towards the east as it has another at-grade interchange with Buttermilk Road and Singleton Avenue and again at Bascom and Habersham Roads before returning to SR 73 (North Main Street) and curving north where SR 73 Loop and the frontage roads come to an end. The division ends in front of the Village Green Motel just before leaving the city limits, and curves to the northeast with the name Burton's Ferry Highway.

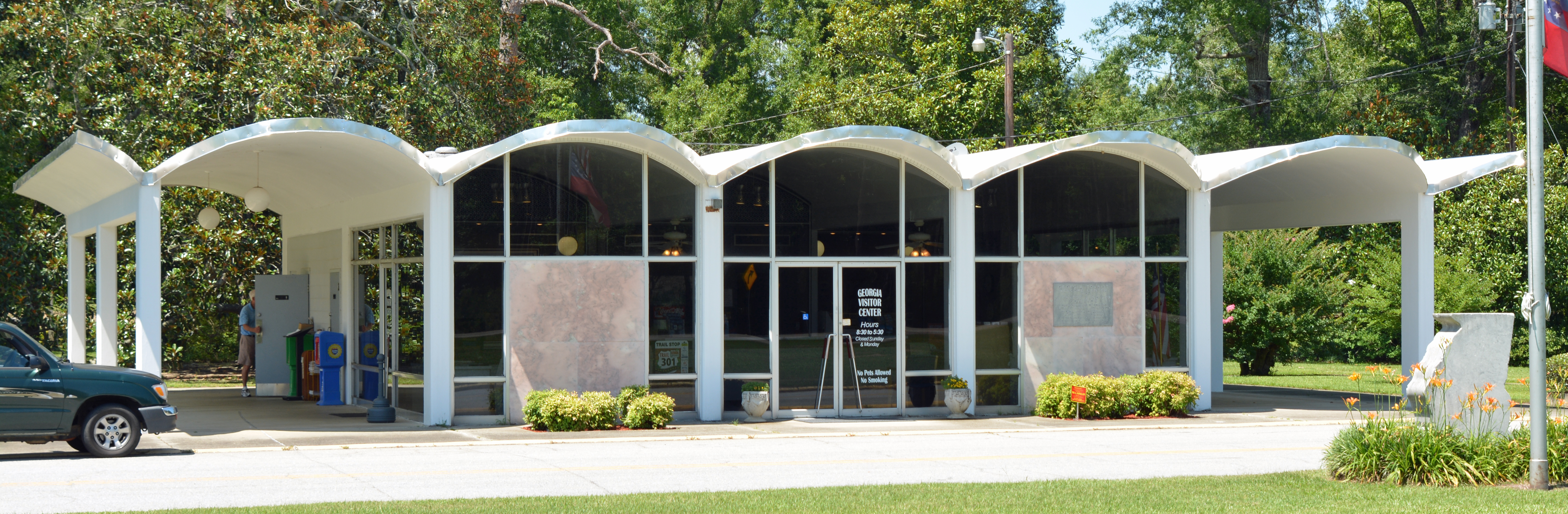
Welcome center

Along the way, the route passes the South Manor Motel, which advertises to hunters, one common driveway next to a local residence, then the Dreamland Motel and R&D's Seafood Restaurant. The only other intersection north of this which serves as a landmark is oriented east-northeast and is named Indian Branch Road, a dirt road that's only notable for leading to a local church. The road then curves more toward the north near an abandoned gas station before the intersection of Country Club Drive, which leads to Brier Creek Country Club. Little else besides more ranch and forest land can be found until the road passes the New Home Welcome Church, and then an intersection with Reddick Cemetery Road, which leads to the as named cemetery located on a small lake. A similarly purposed road can be found shortly after this in the form of the two ends of Lawton Cemetery Road both of which travel east of US 301/SR 73, then after the second intersection, a paved road going to the west named Lawton Road. After some random local businesses, the route approaches one of the few rural gas stations along the road that tries to cater to truck drivers just before the south end of the concurrency with SR 24 as both roads cross a bridge over Beaverdam Creek, then intersects Bryan's Bridge Road to the northeast and Landmark Road to the northwest before the road divides. Four historical markers can be found in the median across from the intersection of Dell Goodall Road, which only intersects with the southbound lanes, and then has an at-grade interchange with the north end of the concurrency with SR 24. The road narrows back down into a two-lane undivided highway as it passes an unnamed dirt road leading to two churches, and a former gas station on a private residence. The rest of the road is aligned with random small farms and encounters a second intersection with Bryan's Bridge Road, which contains the remains of another former gas station on the southwest corner. North of there, the surroundings include more forest land than farmland, even as it curves to the northeast before crossing a bridge over the swamps of Brier Creek. North of the Brier Creek wetlands, the road intersects Plantation Road and Pine Grove Inn Road, then after passing Harmony Church and Cemetery, bears off to the right from a road named Harmony Road which travels relatively northwest off into the woods. After the intersection with Oglethorpe Trail and Old River Road, US 301/SR 73 curves to the east before encountering Georgia's first Welcome Center, which has been listed on the National Register of Historic Places since December 29, 2011. A former segment of the road is found on the southwest corner of the entrance to Archadian Road, which leads to the Burton's Ferry Public Boat Launching Ramp. The existing US 301/SR 73 travels around the former section as it approaches the 1965-built Burton's Ferry Bridge which is parallel to the former Parker Truss Swing Bridge from 1938 both of which cross over the Savannah River and the state line with South Carolina, where SR 73 officially terminates, while US 301 continues through the Carolinas, Virginia, Maryland, and Delaware.

=== National Highway System ===
The only segments of US 301 that are included as part of the National Highway System, a system of routes determined to be the most important for the nation's economy, mobility and defense, are as follows:

- From the Florida state line to Homeland
- From Jesup to Ludowici
- From I-16 to the South Carolina state line

== History ==
=== 1920s ===
The roadway that would eventually become US 301/SR 73 was established at least as early as 1919 as part of SR 15 from the Florida state line to Homeland and part of SR 38 from Jesup to Ludowici. By the end of 1921, the crossing of the Altamaha River, between Jesup and Ludowici, was indicated to have "no bridge or ferry". Part of SR 23 was established from Ludowici to a point south of Glennville, where it curved to the northwest. Part of SR 26 was established southwest of Statesboro. By the end of 1926, US 1 was designated on SR 15 from the Florida state line to Homeland. This segment of US 1/SR 15 had a "completed semi hard surface". The Wayne County portion of the Jesup–Ludowici segment of SR 38 was under construction. By the end of 1929, SR 4 was designated on US 1/SR 15 from the Florida state line to Homeland. The entire segment of SR 38 between Jesup and Ludowici had a completed semi hard surface. The segment of SR 23 from Ludowici to the Long–Tattnall county line, as well as SR 26 southwest of Statesboro, had a "sand clay or top soil" surface.

=== 1930s ===
By the middle of 1930, SR 15 was truncated off of US 1/SR 4. SR 24 was extended southeast to Sylvania. The segment of US 1/SR 4 from the Florida state line to Homeland had a completed hard surface. A portion of SR 26 southwest of Statesboro had a sand clay or top soil surface. Later that year, the Jesup–Ludowici segment of SR 38 was under construction. By the end of 1931, the crossing of the Altamaha River was indicated to again have a bridge. SR 73 was designated from US 280/SR 30 in Claxton to SR 26 southwest of Statesboro. It was also designated from SR 24 north of Sylvania to the South Carolina state line. The segment of SR 24 north of Sylvania was under construction. In April 1932, SR 23 was extended southward from Ludowici on SR 38 to Jesup and solely south-southwest through Nahunta to Folkston. The Jesup–Ludowici segment of SR 23/SR 38 had a sand clay or top soil surface. In September, the portion of SR 24 north of Sylvania had a completed hard surface. Between November 1932 and May 1933, SR 73 was extended from a point southwest of Statesboro to Sylvania. Nearly the entire Tattnall County portion of the segment of SR 23 from Ludowici to south of Glennville, as well as the southern half of the segment of SR 73 from north of Sylvania to the South Carolina state line, was under construction. In May, the Jesup–Ludowici segment of SR 23/SR 38 had a completed hard surface. In July, the entire Tattnall County portion of the segment of SR 23 from Ludowici to south of Glennville also had a completed hard surface. The next year, SR 73 was extended south-southwest from Claxton to Glennville. A portion of SR 23 north-northeast of Nahunta was under construction. By the middle of 1935, this segment had completed grading, but was not surfaced. In the first half of 1936, the southern part of the segment of SR 73 from north of Sylvania to the South Carolina state line had completed grading, but was not surfaced. Nearly the entire Evans County portion of the segment of SR 73 from Claxton to southwest of Statesboro was under construction. By October, the Brantley County portion of the Nahunta–Jesup segment of SR 23 was under construction. By the end of the year, the crossing of the Savannah River was indicated to have no bridge or ferry. Late in the year, the southern part of the Ludowici–Glennville segment of SR 23 had a completed hard surface. The segment of US 1/SR 15 from the Florida state line to Homeland, as well as the Wayne County portion of the Nahunta–Jesup segment of SR 23 was under construction. By the end of the year, two segments were under construction: a portion of SR 73 south of Claxton and the northern part of the segment of SR 73 from north of Sylvania to the South Carolina state line. Later that year, the Long County portion of the Ludowici–Glennville segment of SR 23 had a completed hard surface. A portion of SR 73 south-southwest of Sylvania had completed grading, but was not surfaced. The portion of SR 73 from north of Sylvania to the South Carolina state line was under construction. By the middle of 1939, US 25 was extended southward from Statesboro to Jesup. The crossing of the Savannah River was indicated to again have a bridge. Two segments were under construction: The Charlton County portion of the Folkston–Nahunta segment of SR 23 and the northern part of the Bulloch County portion of the Statesboro–Sylvania segment of SR 73. By October, the Nahunta–Jesup segment of SR 23 had completed grading, but was not surfaced. The Brantley County portion of the Folkston–Nahunta segment of SR 23 was under construction.

=== 1940s to 1970s ===
In 1940, two segments had a completed hard surface: the Nahunta–Jesup segment of SR 23 and the segment of SR 73 from north of Sylvania to the South Carolina state line. At the end of 1940, south-southwest of Nahunta, SR 23 had a completed hard surface. By the middle of 1941, the segment of US 25/SR 73 from the Evans–Bulloch county line to SR 46 southwest of Statesboro also had a completed hard surface. By the end of the year, a small portion of SR 73 southwest of Sylvania also was completed. In 1942, this type of surface was applied to the Tattnall County portion of the Glennville–Claxton segment of US 25/SR 73. The next year, this was applied to the Evans County portion of this same segment. Also, the small portion southwest of Sylvania had a sand clay or top soil surface. In 1944, the southern half of the Bulloch County portion of the Statesboro–Sylvania segment of SR 73 was completed. Between the beginning of 1945 and November 1946, the entire length of what would eventually become US 301 was hard surfaced. By February 1948, US 301 was designated on its then-current path. This was due to the fact that US 301/SR 23 did not travel through Homeland at the time. By August 1950, US 23 was designated on the Folkston–Homeland segment. By the end of 1951, US 301/SR 23 shifted westward to travel on US 1/US 23/SR 4 on this segment. Between July 1957 and June 1960, SR 73's path on US 25/US 301, straddling the SR 46/SR 119 intersection southwest of Statesboro (just east-southeast of Register), was redesignated as SR 73E. By June 1963, SR 121 was extended southeast on the Folkston–Homeland segment. In 1970, SR 73 Loop was established between two intersections with US 301/SR 73 (one south-southwest of the city and the other north of it). US 301 was routed onto SR 73 Loop. US 301's former path through the city (on SR 73) was redesignated as US 301 Bus.

== Major intersections ==
County	Location	mi	km	Destinations	Notes
St. Marys River		0.000	0.000	US 1 south / US 23 south / US 301 south (SR 15 south) / SR 4 begins – Hilliard, Jacksonville	Continuation into Florida; southern end of SR 4 concurrency; southern terminus of SR 4; GA SR 15 continues as FL SR 15 at the state line
Charlton	Folkston	4.201	6.761	SR 40 east (Main Street) to I-95 – Kingsland	Western terminus of SR 40
Charlton	Folkston	4.275	6.880	Love Street	Former SR 252 east
Charlton	Folkston	4.678	7.529	SR 23 south / SR 121 south – St. George	Southern end of SR 23 and SR 121 concurrencies
Charlton	Folkston	5.044	8.118	SR 40 Conn. east (Indian Trail) – Kingsland, White Oak, Charlton County High School, D. Ray James Prison	Western terminus of SR 40 Conn.; provides access to Charlton Family Care
Charlton	Folkston–Homeland line	6.772	10.898	US 1 north / US 23 north / SR 4 north / SR 15 north / SR 121 north – Waycross	Interchange; northern end of US 1/US 23/SR 4/SR 15 and SR 121 concurrencies
Brantley	Nahunta	30.131	48.491	US 82 / SR 520 (South Georgia Parkway) – Waycross, Brunswick	
Brantley	Hortense	39.507	63.580	SR 32 – Patterson, Brunswick	
Wayne	Jesup	58.113	93.524	US 25 south (Golden Isles Parkway) / US 341 / SR 27 – Brunswick, Altamaha Tech	Southern end of US 25 concurrency
Wayne	Jesup	60.566	97.472	US 84 west / SR 38 west – Waycross	Southern end of US 84/SR 38 concurrency
Long	Ludowici	70.279	113.103	US 84 east / SR 38 east / SR 57 south (McDonald Street) to I-95 – Hinesville, Darien, Ludowici Well Pavilion Historic Site	Northern end of US 84/SR 38 concurrency; southern end of SR 57 concurrency
Tattnall		89.451	143.957	SR 196 east – Hinesville	Western terminus of SR 196
Tattnall	Glennville	91.270	146.885	SR 23 north / SR 57 north / SR 73 begins / SR 144 (Barnard Street) – Reidsville, Baxley, Fort Stewart, Gordonia-Alatamaha State Park & Golf Course	Northern end of SR 23 and SR 57 concurrencies; southern end of SR 73 concurrency; southern terminus of SR 73
Evans	Claxton	106.911	172.057	US 280 / SR 30 / SR 129 (Main Street) – Reidsville, Metter, Pembroke	
Evans		113.277	182.302	SR 169 south – Bellville	Northern terminus of SR 169
Bulloch		117.618	189.288	I-16 (Jim Gillis Highway / SR 404) – Macon, Savannah	I-16 exit 116
Bulloch		121.252	195.136	SR 46 – Metter, Savannah, Meinhardt Vineyards	
Bulloch	Statesboro	126.702	203.907	US 25 Byp. north / US 301 Byp. north / SR 67 Byp. (Veterans Memorial Parkway / SR 73 Byp. north) – Millen, Sylvania, Paulson Stadium, Georgia Southern University, Magnolia Springs State Park	Southern terminus of US 25 Byp., US 301 Byp., and SR 73 Byp.; provides access to Statesboro-Bulloch County Airport and Willingway Hospital
Bulloch	Statesboro	128.584	206.936	SR 67 south (Fair Road) – Pembroke, Hinesville, Fort Stewart	Southern end of SR 67 concurrency
Bulloch	Statesboro	129.704	208.738	US 25 north / US 80 / SR 26 / SR 67 north (Northside Drive) – Swainsboro, Savannah	Northern end of US 25 and SR 67 concurrencies
Bulloch	Statesboro	131.240	211.210	US 301 Byp. south (Veterans Memorial Parkway / SR 73 Byp. south) – Claxton, Ogeechee Technical College	Northern terminus of US 301 Byp./SR 73 Byp.
Screven	Cooperville	140.589	226.256	SR 17 – Savannah, Millen	
Screven	Sylvania	150.641	242.433	SR 21 south (Sylvania Bypass) – Savannah	Southern end of SR 21 concurrency
Screven	Sylvania	150.806	242.699	SR 73 north (West Ogeechee Street) / SR 73 Loop begins – Sylvania, Downtown Sylvania	Northern end of SR 73 concurrency; southern terminus of SR 73 Loop; southern end of SR 73 Loop concurrency
Screven	Sylvania	152.726	245.789	SR 21 north / SR 21 Bus. east (Mims Road) – Millen, Sylvania, Downtown Sylvania, Screven County Rec. Dept.	Northern end of SR 21 concurrency; western terminus of SR 21 Bus.
Screven	Sylvania	153.830	247.565	SR 73 south (North Main Street) – Downtown Sylvania	Northern terminus of SR 73 Loop; northern end of SR 73 Loop concurrency; southern end of SR 73 concurrency
Screven		157.704	253.800	SR 24 east – Newington	Southern end of SR 24 concurrency
Screven		158.368	254.869	SR 24 west – Waynesboro, Augusta, Sardis	Northern end of SR 24 concurrency
Savannah River		169.392	272.610	US 301 north / SR 73 ends – Allendale	Continuation into South Carolina over Burtons Ferry Bridge; northern end of SR 73 concurrency; northern terminus of SR 73
1.000 mi = 1.609 km; 1.000 km = 0.621 mi: Concurrency terminus

== See also ==
- Special routes of U.S. Route 301

U.S. Route 301
Previous state: Florida	Georgia	Next state: South Carolina
