= Alex Creek (Altamaha River tributary) =

Stream in Georgia, USA

Alex Creek Tributary to Altamaha River
- Location of Alex Creek mouth Alex Creek (Altamaha River tributary) (the United States)

Location
- Country: United States
- State: Georgia
- County: Wayne

Physical characteristics
- Source: Little Buffalo Swamp divide
  - location: about 2 miles south-southeast of Grangerville, Georgia
  - coordinates: 31°25′33.80″N 081°43′6.40″W
  - elevation: 14 ft (4.3 m)
- Mouth: Altamaha River
  - location: about 3 miles northeast of Grangerville, Georgia
  - coordinates: 31°30′33.79″N 081°39′31.40″W
  - elevation: 13 ft (4.0 m)
- Length: 7.38 mi (11.88 km)
- Basin size: 32.03 square miles (83.0 km^{2})
- Discharge
  - location: Altamaha River
  - average: 31.78 cu ft/s (0.900 m^{3}/s) at mouth with Altamaha River

Basin features
- Progression: Altamaha River → Altamaha Sound → Atlantic Ocean
- River system: Altamaha
- Tributaries
  - right: Bull Branch
- Bridges: Akin Road, US 25, Akin Road, River Road

Alex Creek is a stream in the U.S. state of Georgia. It is a tributary to the Altamaha River.

A variant name is "Alecks Creek". Alex Creek was named after "Captain" Alleck, a Lower Creek chieftain.
