= Hopeulikit, Georgia =

- Unincorporated community
- Location in Bulloch County and the state of Georgia
- Country: United States
- State: Georgia
- County: Bulloch

Area
  - Total: 2.25 sq mi (5.8 km^{2})
  - Land: 2.25 sq mi (5.8 km^{2})
  - Water: 0 sq mi (0 km^{2})
- Elevation: 223 ft (68 m)

Population (2019)
  - Total: 769 (Estimate)
- Time zone: UTC-5 (Eastern (EST))
  - Summer (DST): UTC-4 (EDT)
- ZIP code: 30461
- Area code: 912

Hopeulikit (/ˌhoʊpjuːˈlaɪkɪt/ HOHP-yoo-LYKE-it) is an unincorporated community in Bulloch County, Georgia, United States.

Pronounced "Hope you like it", the community’s unusual name stems from a 1920s-era dance hall located at the junction of U.S. Route 80 and U.S. Route 25, where the current-day community is located. Hopeulikit has frequently been noted on lists of unusual place names.

The town of "Hopeulikit" is located 8 miles northwest of Statesboro and 74 miles south of Augusta, at the intersection of Georgia highways U.S. 25 and U.S. 80. This most unusual name had an equally interesting origination, from a 1920s-era dance hall located at the junction of U.S. Route 80 and U.S. Route 25, where the community is situated.

Some of the originating families have been there since before the community was named, such as the Beasley family. The Beasley House in Hopeulikit, Bulloch County, GA. Built in 1907 by Dan T. and Mary Akins Beasley. Dan was a blacksmith. The state of Georgia has recognized Hopeulikit as a community since its formation in the early 1960s, but the community has remained unincorporated.

== Geography ==
Hopeulikit is located at 32°31.8′N 81°51.1′W (32.5216, -81.8504), approximately eight miles north-west of Statesboro at the intersection of U.S. Highways 25 and 80. Hopeulikit is 223 feet (68 m) above sea level.

== Demographics ==
Hopeulikit is unincorporated and therefore is not surveyed by the U.S. Census.

== Public awareness ==
When traveling U.S. Route 25 or U.S. Route 80 in Bulloch County, commuters' attention is sure to be drawn to one of the several green road signs saying, "Welcome to Hopeulikit". In the 1920s - 1930s, the area played host to one of the region's largest attractions, "The Hopeulikit Dance Hall". Since the community's formation and adaptation of the unusual name, Georgians have been drawn to the history of this small community, which has caused Hopeulikit to receive attention in the media (WTOC-TV) based out of Savannah and on several tourist attraction themed websites such as: SouthEastRoads, RoadsideThoughts, and The State of Georgia's Communities.
