= Scarboro, Georgia =

Unincorporated community in Georgia, U.S.

Coordinates: 32°42′48″N 81°52′31″W

Scarboro is an unincorporated community in Jenkins County, in the U.S. state of Georgia.

== History ==
The community was named after Enos H. Scarborough, the town's promoter and early postmaster. A variant spelling was "Scarborough". A post office was in operation at Scarboro(ugh) from 1839 until it was discontinued in 1951.

The Georgia General Assembly incorporated Scarboro as a town in 1859. The town's municipal charter was repealed in 1995.
