= Culture of Evans County, Georgia =

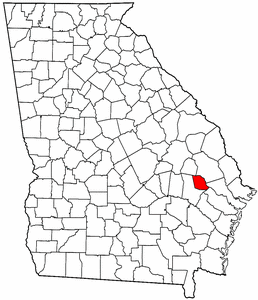

The Culture of Evans County, Georgia is a subculture of the state of Georgia. The most common ancestries in Evans County are American; English; Irish; German; Scots-Irish; French; and Italian. The county has many customs, among them an annual Rattlesnake and Wildlife Festival and a century ride. Evans County's cuisine including seafood, corn on the cob and Brunswick stew, as well as Mexican and Chinese food.

History and recreation are very important in Evans County. A number of books have been written concerning the county's history since its creation on August 11, 1914, as well as memoirs of the lives of some who have lived in the county. Outdoor activities include school sports, fishing, going to local parks, and golf.

== People ==
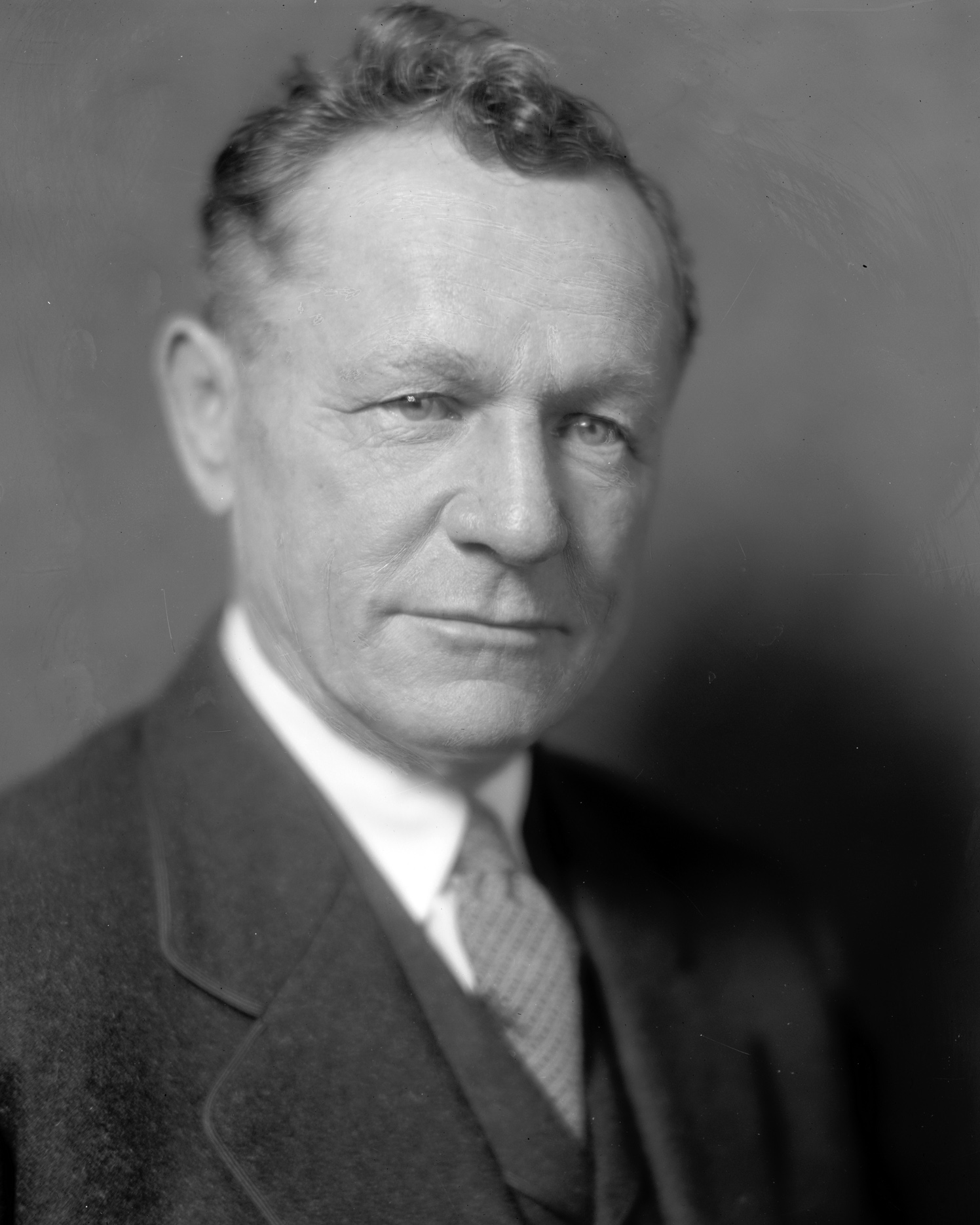
U.S. Representative from Hagan, Georgia

Evans County is populated by many different ethnic groups. Among these groups are Whites; Blacks or African Americans; Native Americans; Asians; Pacific Islanders; and Hispanics or Latinos. Foreign born Evans Countians are predominantly Mexican, followed by Filipinos; Guatemalans; Japanese; Indians; Germans; and Indonesians. The most common ancestries in Evans County include American; English; Irish; German; Scots-Irish; French; and Italian.

=== Notable Evans Countians ===
Evans County has had a number of notable citizens. Joseph Kennedy, a veteran of the United States Army and recipient of the Bronze Star, was born in Claxton and went on to become a senator for the area and president pro tempore of the Georgia State Senate. Albert Parker and Ira S. Womble, Sr. both made Claxton and Evans County famous through their respective companies, The Claxton Bakery and The Georgia Fruitcake Company. Cartha Deke DeLoach, a native Evans Countian, joined the FBI and worked alongside J. Edgar Hoover while Dr. Curtis Gordon Hames did a groundbreaking study on heart disease. Two Evans County natives, Charles Gordon Edwards of Daisy, and William Washington Larsen of Hagan, went on to become United States representatives. Bellville native James Kicklighter is noted for his work in entertainment around the world.

== History ==
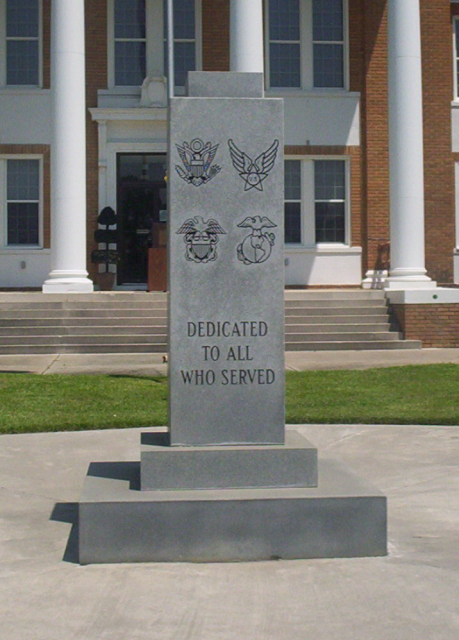
Memorial to Evans County veterans

On August 11, 1914, less than one month after the beginning of World War I, the Georgia General Assembly proposed a constitutional amendment to create Evans County from Bulloch and Tattnall counties. Evans County was approved through the constitutional amendment process because of an earlier amendment from 1904 which limited the number of counties to 145. In order to get around this amendment, a new amendment was passed which allowed for the creation of Evans County. Georgia voters ratified the proposed amendment by a vote of 36,689 to 9,789 on November 3, 1914, which marks the official date of Evans County's creation.

There have been many significant events during the county's history. June 24, 1940 marked the appointment of Josie Mae Rogers to the position of sheriff; she would later become the first female sheriff elected in the county and in Georgia. Another is the creation of Fort Stewart Georgia in July 1940, which displaced approximately 1,500 people. In 1958, Dr. Curtis Gordon Hames began research on the Evans County Hear Study, which was funded by the National Institute of Health. And on December 28, 1994 a monument to Evans County's veterans was erected by the local chapter of the American Legion. On June 3, 2008 Evans County commissioners unanimously passed a resolution to mark August 11 as Evans County Day. Since that day there have been annual celebrations of the county's founding and preparations for the 2014 centennial celebration.

== Architecture ==
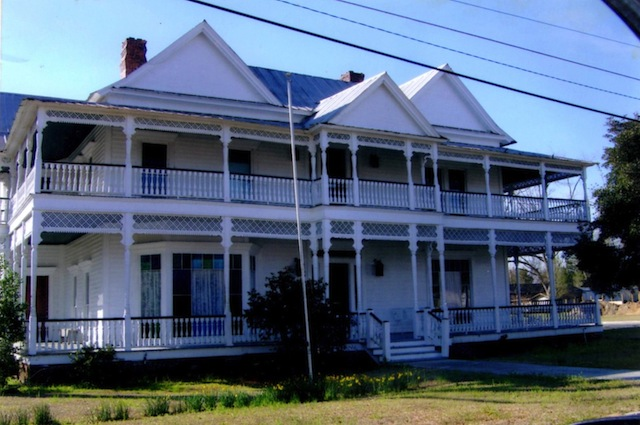
The George W. DeLoach House in Hagan, Georgia

A number of buildings and homes in Evans County are on the National Register of Historic Places. In Claxton, there is the Dr. James W. Daniel House; the Evans County Courthouse; and the Mitchell J. Green Plantation. In Hagan, there is the George W. DeLoach House. And at Camp Oliver there is the Glissom, Remer, Store (DOE). Other places of interest include the Daisy Post Office and the train depot in Bellville.

Evans County is also home to a number of antebellum houses that were built prior to the formation of the county. Many of these homes were built in the Plantation Plain style and include the A.D. Eason House; the Thomas A. Durrence House; and the Edwards-Strickland House.

== Customs ==
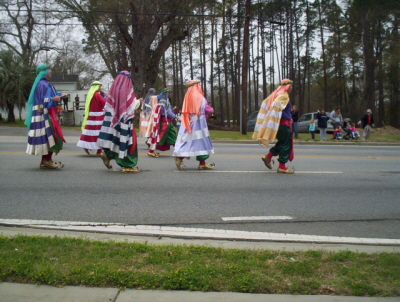
Shriners participating in the annual Rattlesnake Roundup Parade in Claxton, Evans County, Georgia

Evans County has held an annual rattlesnake roundup the second weekend of March since 1968, with the roundup festival growing every year since then and moving from within Claxton to just outside the city in 2001. Recently, the roundup has undergone a change and is now The Claxton Rattlesnake and Wildlife Festival. Another, more recent, annual event is the Cruisin' in the Country Bike Ride, which began in 1995 as the Yuletide Ride. The event was changed from December to November the next year and expanded to include a 65-mile (105 km) route. Eventually, the route became a complete century ride.

Other events include the Martin Luther King Day parade, held every January. Christmas in Claxton, which occurs on the first Saturday in December, includes arts and crafts, food, and the Parade of Lights. The Richey Arena has barrel racing and other activities. Lastly, there is a tractor pull held on the first Saturday of each month at the Longneedle Farm Truck and Tractor Pull. An annual Chicken Pickin' festival has also been held annually since September 11, 2010.

== Cuisine ==
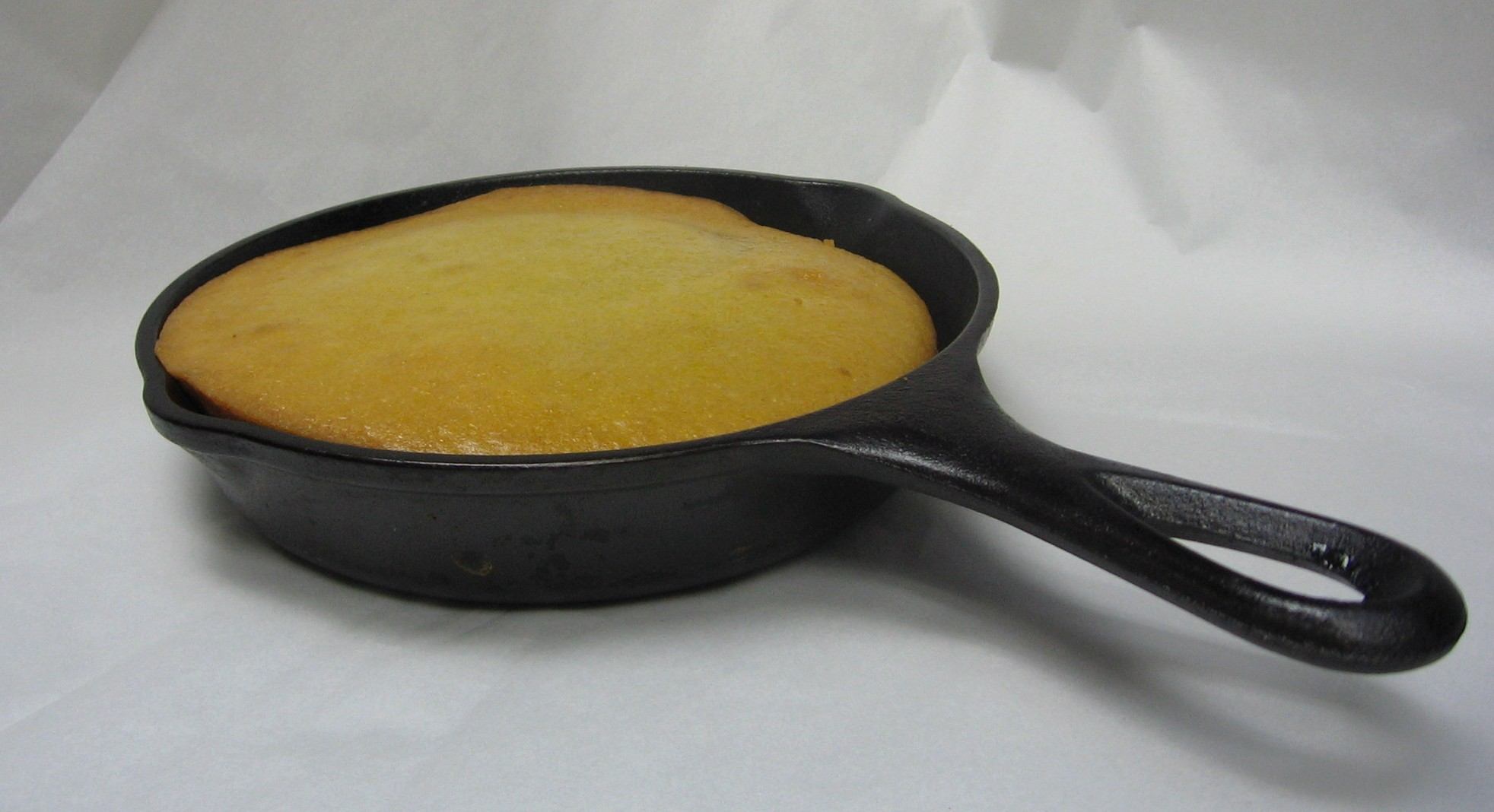
Skillet-baked cornbread

Evans County's cuisine includes a variety of different foods ranging from seafood, corn on the cob and chicken and dumplings to Brunswick stew, fried chicken and cornbread. Other well known and loved foods in the county include pecans, peaches and peanuts. However, these are not the only foods enjoyed by Evans Countians. Because of the diversity within the county, the people of Evans County also frequent Mexican and Chinese restaurants.

== Literature ==
Houses of Heart Pine: A Survey of the Antebellum Architecture of Evans County, Georgia by Pharris DeLoach Johnson

Several books have been written about the history of Evans County and her cities, as well as memoirs of individuals who have grown up in the county. Evans County's historical works include A History of Our Locale: Mainly Evans County Georgia by Lucille Hodges in 1965; A History of Evans County, Georgia by Dottie Simmons in 1999 and Evans County and the Creation of Fort Stewart, Georgia by Pharris DeLoach Johnson in 2001. The antebellum architecture of the county is detailed in Pharris DeLoach Johnson's Houses of Heart Pine: A Survey of the Antebellum Architecture of Evans County, Georgia. Memoirs written by those who have grown up in Evans County include The Good Lord Knew What He Was Doing When He Made "A Country Boy" by Aubrey Strickland and Flatwoods and Lighterknots: A Cultural Visit to the Coastal Plains of Georgia by James Elders, published in 2006.

== Media ==
The Claxton Enterprise is a weekly newspaper located in Claxton, Georgia, USA. It primarily serves Evans County, Georgia. The Enterprise was established in 1912 with its first issue being published on December 4, 1912. The current publisher is Mitchell Peace.

Two radio stations serve the Evans County area. WCLA (1470 AM) is an AM station which plays Gospel music and Oldies, as well as providing local news and weather. WAWS (107.3 FM) is an FM station which plays contemporary Christian music.

== Sports and recreation ==
Sports in Evans County include the Claxton High School athletic program and the Pinewood Christian Academy athletic program. The county is also home to a handful of public areas which are set aside for recreation. The Evans County Public Fishing Area, located in Claxton, is one such area and contains three lakes of 8, 30 and 84 acres and primitive campsites. Families can also picnic at the lake and an outdoor classroom is available for use. Parks include Bacon Ford Park and the Senior Citizens Park in Claxton. Two parks in Hagan are the Maggie Mae Lewis Children's Park and the Bradley Memorial Park.

Another outdoor recreational area is the Evans Heights Golf Club. The course was designed by Don Cottle, Jr. in 1970 and has Bermuda Grass. In total, the course is 6,514 yards.
