= Georgia State Route 250 =

Former state highway in central Georgia, United States

State Route 250

Route information
- Maintained by the State Highway Department of Georgia
- Length: 12.6 mi (20.3 km)
- Existed: 1957–1985

Major junctions
- South end: US 25 / US 301 / SR 73 north of Glennville
- SR 129 south of Daisy
- North end: US 280 / SR 30 in Daisy

Location
- Country: United States
- State: Georgia
- Counties: Tattnall, Evans

Highway system
- Georgia State Highway System; Interstate; US; State; Special
← SR 249	SR 250	→ SR 251

State Route 250 (SR 250) was a state highway that existed in the central part of the U.S. state of Georgia. It traversed through Tattnall and Evans counties. It paralleled the western edge of Fort Stewart. SR 250 had no major cities besides Daisy. Today, it is known as Old Highway 250. SR 250 was considered one of the least traveled state highway in all of Central Georgia.

== Route description ==
SR 250 began at an intersection with US 25/US 301/SR 73 south-southwest of Midway. It then turned north toward Midway. It turned northeast and then turned north-northeast into Midway. After Midway, the highway then straightly entered Evans County via the unincorporated community of Jennie. After crossing through Jennie, it then curved to the northeast, where it had an intersection with SR 129/John Todd Road. north-northwest of Camp Oliver. It made several turns before entering the city of Daisy. It turned to the north-northeast after passing by several lakes. It had an intersection with Melissa Street and Railroad Street. It then entered the core of Daisy, where it crossed the historic Seaboard Air Line Railroad and had an intersection with Main Street (CR 99, former US 280). One block later, SR 250 then had an intersection with US 280 (SR 30, B Smith Street), where the roadway continued as Nevils Road.

== History ==
State Route 250
- Location: West of Midway–Southeastern Evans County
- Existed: 1949–1957

The roadway that would eventually become SR 250 was established between 1945 and the end of 1946 as an eastern segment of SR 64 from US 25/SR 73 south of Claxton to US 280/SR 30 east-southeast of Daisy. This segment was indicated to be "projected mileage". By the end of 1948, the southern terminus of this segment was completed grading, but was not surfaced. By the end of 1949, SR 250 was established on a slightly different alignment. It began at an intersection with US 25/US 301/SR 73 south of Claxton, at a point farther south than the eastern segment of SR 64 did. Its eastern terminus was at SR 129 south-southeast of Claxton, in the northwestern part of Camp Stewart. By the end of 1951, the portion of SR 64 on either side of the SR 250 intersection had a "sand clay, topsoil, or stabilized earth" surface. In 1953, the entire Tattnall County portion of SR 64 had completed grading, but was not surfaced. The northern terminus of it was shifted westward to end in Daisy. By the middle of 1957, SR 250 was shifted northwest, replacing the entire length of the eastern segment of SR 64. By the end of 1963, the entire length of SR 250 was paved. In 1985, SR 250 was decommissioned.

== Major intersections ==
County	Location	mi	km	Destinations	Notes
Tattnall		0.0	0.0	US 301 (US 25 / SR 73) – Claxton, Glennville, Ludowici	Southern terminus of SR 250
Tattnall	Midway	2.2	3.5	Beards Creek Church Road east / Blocker Road west to US 301 north – Claxton, Camp Oliver, Dukes, Fort Stewart, Hinesville	Former alignment of SR 250
Evans		7.5	12.1	SR 129 / John Todd Road – Claxton, Camp Oliver, Fort Stewart, Hinesville	Current southern terminus of SR 129
Evans	Daisy	12.4	20.0	Melissa Street / Railroad Street – Camp Oliver, Fort Stewart, Hinesville	Former southern end of SR 129 concurrency
Evans	Daisy	12.5	20.1	CR 99 / Main Street	Former alignment of US 280/SR 30
Evans	Daisy	12.6	20.3	US 280 (SR 30 / B Smith Street) / Nevils Road north – Nevils, Claxton, Pembroke	Northern terminus of SR 250; former northern end of SR 129 concurrency; roadway continued as Nevils Road toward Nevils
1.000 mi = 1.609 km; 1.000 km = 0.621 mi

== See also ==
- List of former state routes in Georgia
