= Geography of Evans County, Georgia =

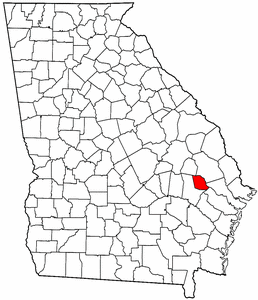
- Map of Georgia with Evans County in red
- Coordinates: 32.1621°N 81.9076°W
- Area
  - Total: 182.85 sq mi (473.6 km^{2})
  - Land: 97.65%
  - Water: 2.35%
- Borders: Candler County; Bulloch County; Bryan County; Liberty County; Tattnall County

The geography of Evans County describes a county in the state of Georgia in the Southeastern United States in North America. According to the 2010 census, the county has a total area of 182.85 square miles (473.6 km^{2}), of which 178.65 square miles (462.7 km^{2}) is land and 4.2 square miles (11 km^{2}) is water. The major body of water is the Canoochee River, which flows through Evans County.

Evans County lies on the coastal plain region of Georgia, an area consisting mostly of sedimentary rocks. Other rocks in the area include sandstone and claystone, and sand and gravel. Some of the sand in Evans County, especially lying near the Canoochee River, is white quartz of a medium to coarse grain.

Evans County has a mild climate, averaging 49.8 degrees in January and 82.7 degrees in July. The average annual rainfall is 48 inches and the county has a minimum altitude of 65 feet (20 m) above sea level and a maximum altitude of 228 feet (69 m) above sea level.

There are four cities in Evans County with 60.2 people per square mile in the area. The county is ranked 145th out of 159 counties in the state in size and is led by a board of six popularly elected commissioners with a chairman elected by the commissioners. There are 199 acres of farmland and 796 acres in orchards in Evans County, with an average value of $92,983 in agricultural products sold by farms. Two major crops in the county are corn and soybeans.

== Physical geography ==
=== Geological development ===
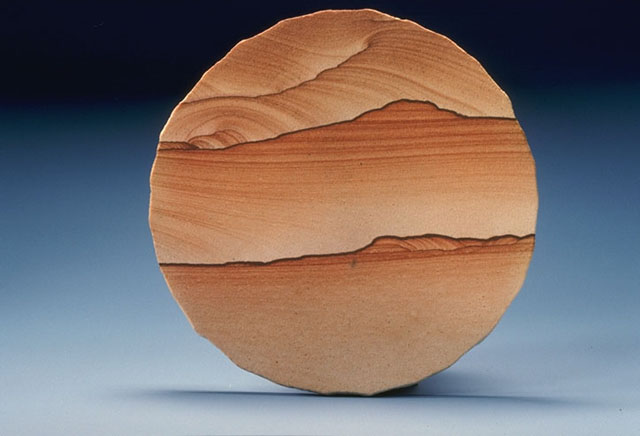
Prepared sample of sandstone

Geologically, Evans County lies in the coastal plain region of Georgia, an area consisting mostly of sedimentary rocks. The coastal plain is divided from the Piedmont by the Fall Line, which passes through Georgia from Augusta, Georgia, in the east, then southwestward to Macon, Georgia, then to Columbus, Georgia, and finally westward to Montgomery, Alabama.

Outcrops of sandstone and claystone from the Neogene era, and known as Neogene undifferentiated, cover 62% of the area in Evans County. The Neogene era has lasted approximately 23 million years, beginning 23.03 ± 0.05 million years ago. Sands and gravels from the Pliocene to the Pleistocene eras are the next most widespread geologic units, covering 26% of Evans County, followed by unconsolidated deposits of rock and sand in marsh and lagoonal facies, covering 10% of the area, and finally dune sand at 0.87% of the area.

=== Rocks and soils ===
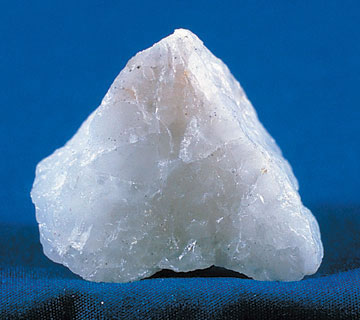
Milky quartz sample

Sedimentary rocks are not the only geological features in Evans County. The county is mostly covered by thin sand and red and yellow clay. The amount of sand in the area can vary from a few inches to several feet. As in Tattnall County along the Ohoopee River, the sand in Evans County that lies along the Canoochee River is white quartz of a medium to coarse grain. There is exploitable medium-grain sand covering about 50 acres of land along the railroad above Bull Creek. The pure white sand along the Canoochee could be made into bottle glass, but is expensive to recover.

Much of Evans County is located in the Southern Coastal Plain Major Land Resource Area, with the southernmost portion of the county located in the Atlantic Coastal Flatwoods Major Land Resource Area.

=== River, creeks and ponds ===
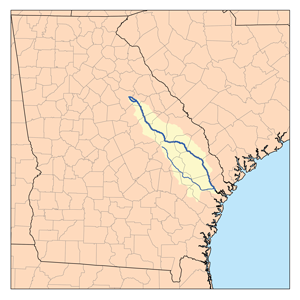
Map of the Ogeechee River watershed showing the Canoochee River

The major body of water in Evans County is the Canoochee River, a 108-mile-long (174 km) river in southeastern Georgia. Other bodies of water are Cypress Pond; Dyess Pond; Beasley Pond; Tippins Lake; Bernard Smith Pond; I.W. DeLoach Ponds; Big Beasley Pond; and DeLoach Pond. Creeks that flow in Evan County are Grice Creek, Billy Fork Creek, Thick Creek, Mill Branch, Barnard Mill, Rocky Branch, Scott Creek, Cedar Creek, and Dry Creek.

== Climate ==
Evans County has a mild climate, averaging 49.8 degrees in January and 82.7 degrees in July. The average annual rainfall is 48 inches and the county has a minimum altitude of 65 feet (20 m) above sea level and a maximum altitude of 228 feet (69 m) above sea level. The county is 1.4 times below the U.S. average in historical area-adjusted tornado activity. From 1950 to 2004, only 2 injuries have been caused by tornadoes in the county; this occurred on March 29, 1974, when an F1 tornado hit the county, causing between $5,000 and $50,000 in damages.

Monthly average daily high and low temperatures for Evans County cities
City	Jan	Feb	Mar	Apr	May	Jun	Jul	Aug	Sep	Oct	Nov	Dec
Bellville	61; 36	66; 39	73; 44	79; 50	86; 59	91; 67	94; 71	92; 70	87; 65	80; 54	71; 45	63; 38
Claxton	61; 36	66; 39	73; 44	79; 50	86; 59	91; 67	94; 71	92; 70	87; 65	80; 54	71; 45	63; 38
Daisy	61; 36	66; 39	73; 44	79; 50	86; 59	91; 67	94; 71	92; 70	87; 65	80; 54	71; 45	63; 38
Hagan	61; 36	66; 39	73; 44	79; 50	86; 59	91; 67	94; 71	92; 70	87; 65	80; 54	71; 45	63; 38
Temperatures are given in °F format, with highs on top of lows

== Political and human geography ==
Map showing the location of Evans County and the location of the cities within the county

Evans County is made up of four cities: Claxton, the county seat; Bellville, Daisy, and Hagan. With a total area of 182.85 square miles (473.6 km^{2}) the county is ranked 145th, in size, out of 159 counties in Georgia. There are 60.2 people per square mile in the area. The county is led by a board of six commissioners elected by the people and a chairman elected by the commissioners. Serving members wield both executive and legislative power in the county. The map to the right shows Evans County's location in Georgia and the location of the county's four cities, with Claxton highlighted.

== Natural resources ==
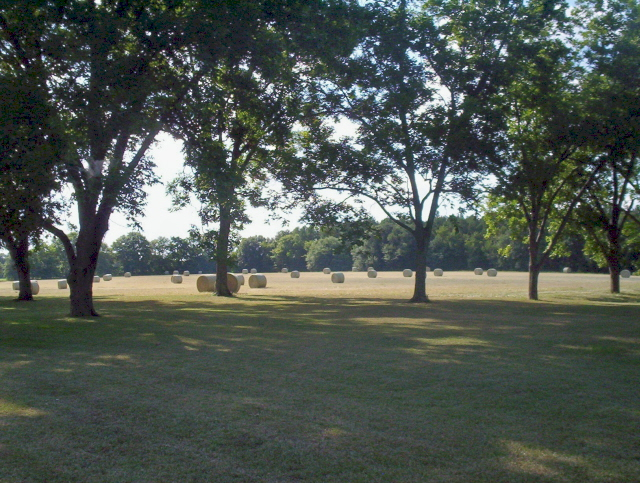
bales of hay adjacent to a pecan tree orchard outside of Claxton, Georgia, in Evans County

=== Agriculture and water ===
Evans County has 199 acres of farmland and 796 acres in orchards. The average value of the agricultural products sold by farms in Evans County is $92,983. Corn and cotton are major crops in the county. Other crops planted and harvested in Evans County include soybeans; wheat and vegetables; and land set aside for orchards. Evans Countians consumes 269,420 gallons of water a day out of a plant capacity of 3,720,000 gallons a day. There is an elevated storage capacity of 700,000 gallons.
