= Evans County, Georgia =

County in Georgia, United States

- County
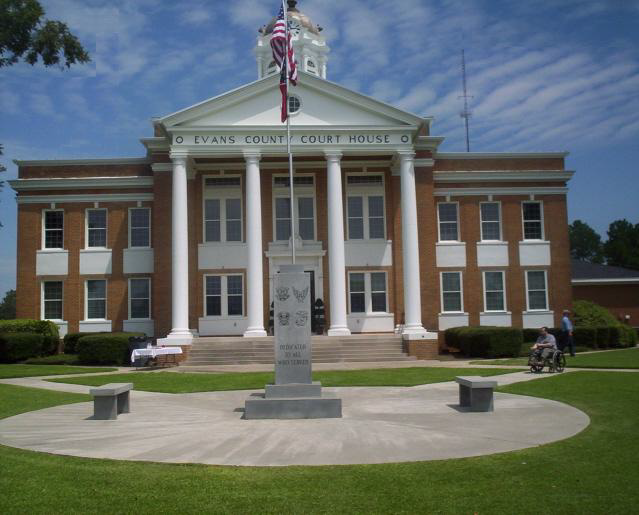
- Evans County Courthouse in Claxton

- Seal

- Location within the U.S. state of Georgia
- Coordinates: 32°10′N 81°53′W
- Country: United States
- State: Georgia
- Founded: 1914; 112 years ago
- Named for: Clement A. Evans
- Seat: Claxton
- Largest city: Claxton

Area
  - Total: 187 sq mi (480 km^{2})
  - Land: 183 sq mi (470 km^{2})
  - Water: 4.0 sq mi (10 km^{2}) 2.1%

Population (2020)
  - Total: 10,774
  - Estimate (2025): 11,028 ▲
  - Density: 59/sq mi (23/km^{2})
- Time zone: UTC−5 (Eastern)
  - Summer (DST): UTC−4 (EDT)
- Congressional district: 12th
- Website: www.evanscounty.org

Evans County is a county in the southeastern portion of the U.S. state of Georgia. As of the 2020 census, the population was 10,774. The county seat is Claxton. A bill creating the county was passed in the Georgia General Assembly on August 11, 1914, and later, on November 3, 1914, an amendment was ratified by a vote of the people which formally created the county. Evans became part of the Statesboro micropolitan area in 2023, joining Bulloch County.

Evans County is located in an area known as the Magnolia Midlands within the Historic South region. The current Evans County Courthouse was created in 1923 and, in 1940, the people of Evans County elected their first female sheriff. Later, in the 1950s and 1960s, new growth came to the county with the building of Evans Memorial Hospital and the Claxton-Evans County Airport. In 2010, the population was 11,000; however, the 2012 Census Estimate showed a population of 10,689.

The county sits firmly within Georgia's coastal plain region and has predominantly sedimentary rock and red and yellow clays. The Canoochee River is the major body of water flowing through the county.

Manufacturing, educational, health and social services make up much of Evans County's diverse economy. Major employers in the county include Camellia Health and Rehabilitation, Claxton Poultry Company, Georgia Department of Corrections, Pinewood Christian Academy, and Valmont Newmark. The county is ranked 64 out of 71 Tier 1 counties with an 8% sales tax. Businesses in the county are 100% exempt on all classes of certain business inventory from property taxes.

== History ==
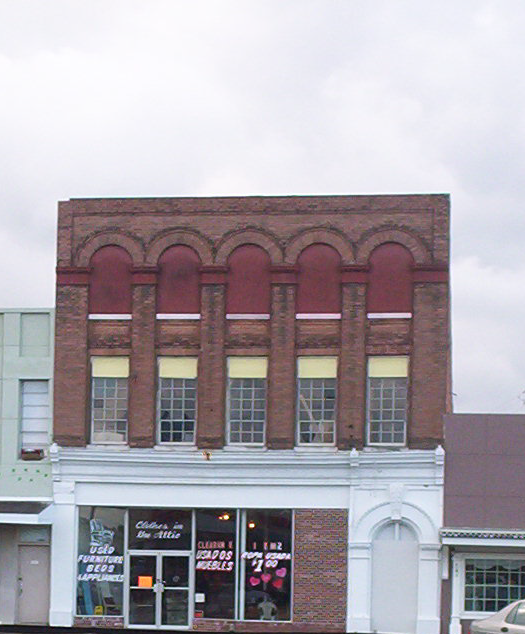
The White Building, a three-story building used as the courthouse until 1923

On August 11, 1914, the Georgia General Assembly proposed a constitutional amendment to create Evans County from Bulloch and Tattnall counties. Georgia voters ratified the proposed amendment by a vote of 36,689 to 9,789 on November 3, 1914, which marks the official date of Evans County's creation. The county was named in honor of Clement A. Evans. Evans was a state senator from Stewart County, Georgia, a Brigadier General in the Confederate States Army, a Methodist minister, an historian and an author.

The push to create Evans County came about for various reasons, most notably the desire to not have to travel so far to the court house; more office jobs; increase in businesses coming to the area, especially in regard to hotels and eating establishments and a belief that there was a minority in Reidsville, Georgia – the county seat in Tattnall County – which controlled the county. Moreover, the entrance of the Savannah and Western Railroad into Tattnall County created a desire by landowners to have stations on their property; ultimately, these new stations led to the founding of the cities which would become part of Evans County: Bellville, Claxton, Daisy and Hagan.

However, not everyone was for the creation of a new county. Some of the arguments against the creation of a new county included: the idea that the difficulties with distance to the courthouse were being overcome; also, the tax burden would override any benefits from new jobs. Evans County was approved through the constitutional amendment process because of an earlier amendment from 1904 which limited the number of counties to 145. In order to get around this amendment, a new amendment was passed which allowed for the creation of Evans County.

The current Evans County courthouse was completed in 1923. The courthouse is in Claxton and was designed in the neoclassical revival tradition by architect J.J. Baldwin. Prior to the building of the current courthouse, all of the county's business was held in the White Building, a three-story edifice built by Mr. R. King White and later bought by Mrs. Ben Daniel. Mrs. Daniel's husband, Dr. Ben Daniel, used the building as his office.

The first female elected sheriff in Evans County, and in Georgia, was Mrs. Josie Mae Rogers, who was appointed after the death of the late sheriff, her father Jesse C. Durrence on June 24, 1940. Later, she was elected sheriff by the people of the county. Not long after, in July 1940, Camp Stewart – which would eventually become Fort Stewart – was created after the United States government bought up several tracts of land in various counties, including Evans County. In all, it is estimated that approximately 1,500 people were displaced by the creation of the camp.

The late 1950s and the 1960s were a time of growth in Evans County, especially in regards to health care and transportation. Beginning in 1958, Dr. Curtis Gordon Hames began research on the Evans County Heart Study, which was funded by the National Institutes of Health; this study would continue until 1995 and resulted in 560 published papers on heart disease, genetics, cancer and other areas. In 1964, the FAA approved a site for the construction of an airport in the county, just three miles (4.8 km) northeast of Claxton. On December 7, 1967, after two decades of effort, Evans Memorial Hospital was opened.

In November 1975, B.G. Tippins, a teacher at Claxton High School, worked with 15 students to build a Miller Lil' Rascal, a two-seat sporting biplane. This plane was the only one of its kind built.

From 1980 to 1983 several buildings were placed on the National Register of Historic Places, including the courthouse and three homes.

On October 16, 2006, the Evans County Sheriff's Department was presented with seven bullet-proof vests by the Georgia Fraternal Order of Police.

On June 3, 2008, Evans County commissioners unanimously passed a resolution to mark August 11 as Evans County Day. Since that day there have been annual celebrations of the county's founding including the 2014 centennial celebration.

== Geography ==
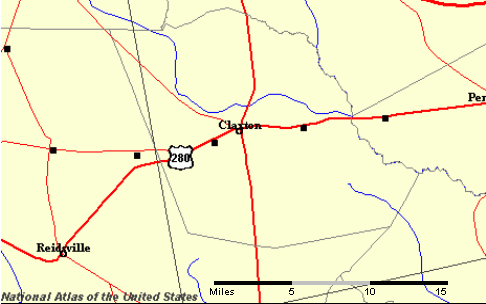
Evans County, showing the county seat, Claxton, and major roads and the major body of water, the Canoochee River

According to the U.S. Census Bureau, the county has a total area of 187 square miles (480 km^{2}), of which 183 square miles (470 km^{2}) is land and 4.0 square miles (10 km^{2}) (2.1%) is water. The major body of water is the Canoochee River which flows through Evans County. The Canoochee is a tributary of the Ogeechee River.

There are several ponds in Evans County. They include Cypress Pond; Dyess Pond; Beasley Pond; Bernard Smith Pond; I.W. DeLoach Ponds; Big Beasley Pond DeLoach Pond. Other bodies of water include Tippins Lake; Grice Creek; Billy Fork Creek; Thick Creek; Mill Branch; Barnard Mill; Rocky Branch; Scott Creek; Cedar Creek; and Dry Creek.

The entirety of Evans County is located in the Canoochee River sub-basin of the Ogeechee River basin.

=== Geology and terrain ===
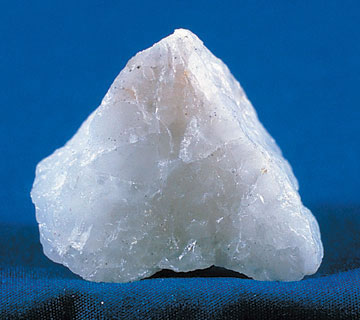
Milky quartz sample

Geologically, Evans County lies in the coastal plain region of Georgia, an area consisting mostly of sedimentary rocks. The coastal plain is divided from the Piedmont by the Fall Line, which passes through Georgia from Augusta, Georgia in the east, then southwestward to Macon, Georgia, then to Columbus, Georgia and finally westward to Montgomery, Alabama.

Yet, sedimentary rocks are not the only geological features to be found in Evans County. The county is mostly covered by thin sand and red and yellow clay. As in Tattnall County along the Ohoopee River, the sand in Evans County that lies along the Canoochee River is white quartz of a medium to coarse grain. There is exploitable medium-grain sand covering about 50 acres of land along the railroad above Bull Creek. The pure white sand along the Canoochee could be made into bottle glass, but is expensive to recover.

=== Flora and fauna ===
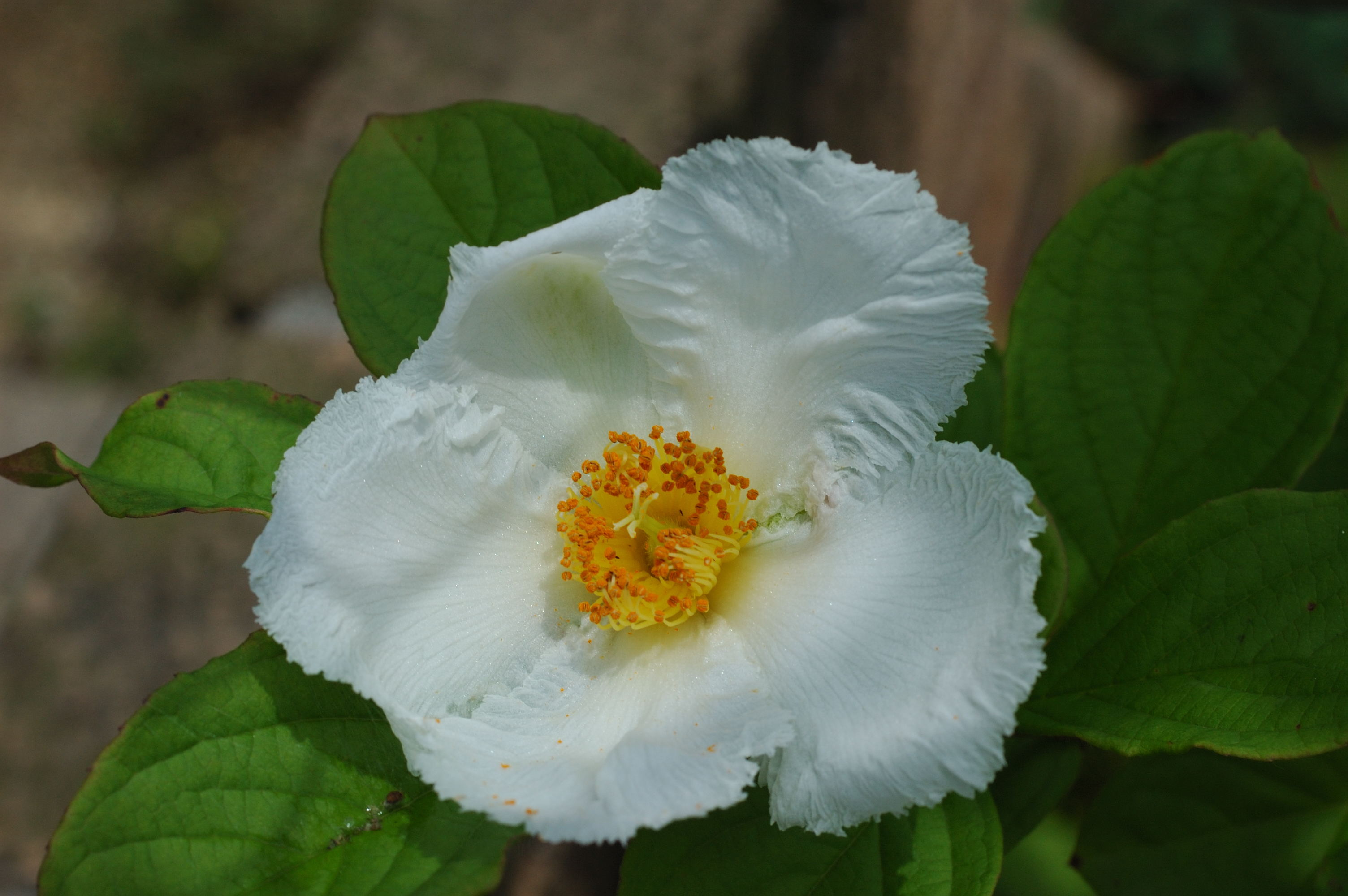
Stewartia pseudocamellia

Evans County is home to several protected species of flora and fauna. Among the flora in the county are the Georgia plume, Sarracenia flava, Sarracenia minor, beardtongue, Stewartia, loblolly-bay and sweetbay. Others include the purple honeycomb head, large-stem morning-glory, few-flower gay-feather, pond spice, Lobelia boykinii, hummingbird flower, and other plants. Protected animals in the area include the red-cockaded woodpecker, the indigo snake, Bachman's sparrow, the spotted turtle, Say's spiketail and the southern bald eagle, among other animals.

=== Climate ===
Evans County is classified as a humid subtropical climate under the Köppen classification and has a mild climate, averaging 49.8 degrees in January and 82.7 degrees in July. The average annual rainfall is 48 inches and the county has a minimum altitude of 65 feet (20 m) above sea level and a maximum altitude of 228 feet (69 m) above sea level. The county is 1.4 times below the U.S. average in historical area-adjusted tornado activity. From 1950 to 2004, only 2 injuries have been caused by tornadoes in the county; this occurred on March 29, 1974, when an F1 tornado hit the county, causing between $5,000 and $50,000 in damages.

Monthly average daily high and low temperatures for Evans County cities
City	Jan	Feb	Mar	Apr	May	Jun	Jul	Aug	Sep	Oct	Nov	Dec
Bellville	61; 36	66; 39	73; 44	79; 50	86; 59	91; 67	94; 71	92; 70	87; 65	80; 54	71; 45	63; 38
Claxton	61; 36	66; 39	73; 44	79; 50	86; 59	91; 67	94; 71	92; 70	87; 65	80; 54	71; 45	63; 38
Daisy	61; 36	66; 39	73; 44	79; 50	86; 59	91; 67	94; 71	92; 70	87; 65	80; 54	71; 45	63; 38
Hagan	61; 36	66; 39	73; 44	79; 50	86; 59	91; 67	94; 71	92; 70	87; 65	80; 54	71; 45	63; 38
Temperatures are given in °F format, with highs on top of lows

=== Adjacent counties ===
- Bulloch County – northeast
- Bryan County – east
- Liberty County – southeast
- Tattnall County – southwest
- Candler County – northwest

== Communities ==
- Bellville
- Claxton
- Daisy
- Hagan

== Demographics ==
Historical population
Census	Pop.	Note	%±
1920	6,594		—
1930	7,102		7.7%
1940	7,401		4.2%
1950	6,653		−10.1%
1960	6,952		4.5%
1970	7,290		4.9%
1980	8,428		15.6%
1990	8,724		3.5%
2000	10,495		20.3%
2010	11,000		4.8%
2020	10,774		−2.1%
2025 (est.)	11,028	▲	2.4%
U.S. Decennial Census; 1790–1880 1890–1910; 1920–1930 1930–1940; 1940–1950 1960–1980; 1980–2000 2010

=== Racial and ethnic composition ===
Evans County, Georgia – Racial and ethnic composition Note: the US Census treats Hispanic/Latino as an ethnic category. This table excludes Latinos from the racial categories and assigns them to a separate category. Hispanics/Latinos may be of any race.
Race / Ethnicity (NH = Non-Hispanic)	Pop 1980	Pop 1990	Pop 2000	Pop 2010	Pop 2020	% 1980	% 1990	% 2000	% 2010	% 2020
White alone (NH)	5,437	5,644	6,333	6,228	6,038	64.51%	64.70%	60.34%	56.62%	56.04%
Black or African American alone (NH)	2,886	2,952	3,439	3,165	3,083	34.24%	33.84%	32.77%	28.77%	28.62%
Native American or Alaska Native alone (NH)	5	2	9	9	15	0.06%	0.02%	0.09%	0.08%	0.14%
Asian alone (NH)	12	14	32	60	78	0.14%	0.16%	0.30%	0.55%	0.72%
Native Hawaiian or Pacific Islander alone (NH)	x	x	0	0	11	x	x	0.00%	0.00%	0.10%
Other race alone (NH)	0	3	6	5	21	0.00%	0.03%	0.06%	0.05%	0.19%
Mixed race or Multiracial (NH)	x	x	51	92	291	x	x	0.49%	0.84%	2.70%
Hispanic or Latino (any race)	88	109	625	1,441	1,237	1.04%	1.25%	5.96%	13.10%	11.48%
Total	8,428	8,724	10,495	11,000	10,774	100.00%	100.00%	100.00%	100.00%	100.00%

=== 2020 census ===
As of the 2020 census, the county had a population of 10,774, 4,099 households, and 2,747 families. The median age was 39.5 years. 24.6% of residents were under the age of 18 and 17.4% of residents were 65 years of age or older. For every 100 females there were 95.0 males, and for every 100 females age 18 and over there were 89.5 males age 18 and over. 0.0% of residents lived in urban areas, while 100.0% lived in rural areas.

The racial makeup of the county was 57.9% White, 28.9% Black or African American, 0.3% American Indian and Alaska Native, 0.8% Asian, 0.1% Native Hawaiian and Pacific Islander, 6.4% from some other race, and 5.6% from two or more races. Hispanic or Latino residents of any race comprised 11.5% of the population.

There were 4,099 households in the county, of which 31.3% had children under the age of 18 living with them and 32.4% had a female householder with no spouse or partner present. About 29.3% of all households were made up of individuals and 14.1% had someone living alone who was 65 years of age or older.

There were 4,646 housing units, of which 11.8% were vacant. Among occupied housing units, 63.4% were owner-occupied and 36.6% were renter-occupied. The homeowner vacancy rate was 1.8% and the rental vacancy rate was 7.1%.

== Economy ==
=== Agriculture and industry ===
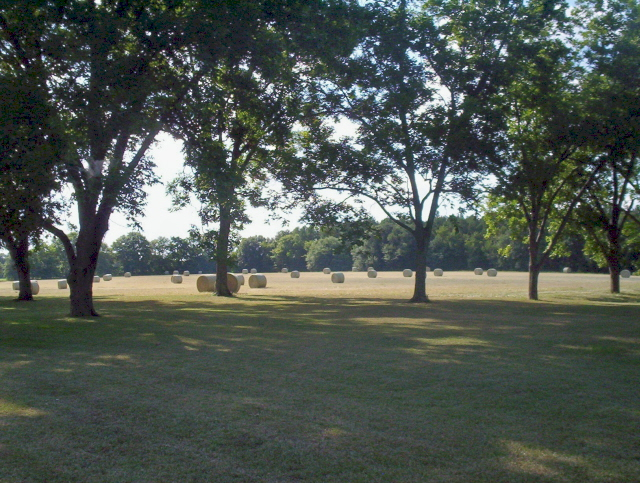
Bales of hay adjacent to a pecan tree orchard outside of Claxton, Georgia in Evans County

Evans County has a diverse economy, with manufacturing; educational, health and social services; retail trade; and construction providing the greatest employment in manufacturing. The Claxton-Evans County Industrial Park provides the strongest source of manufacturing, with the creation of concrete poles and galvanization of metals. Major employers in Evans County include Evans Memorial Hospital, Camellia Health and Rehabilitation, Claxton Poultry Company, Georgia Department of Corrections, Glenvue Nursing Home, JGI Incorporated Galaxy Food Center, McDonald's Restaurants, Nesmith Chevrolet Company, Pinewood Christian Academy, and Valmont Newmark.

Outside of the cities, agriculture is important with corn and cotton being major crops. Other crops planted and harvested in Evans County include soybeans; wheat and vegetables; and land set aside for orchards. The food industry is the most common industry for Evans Countians to work in.

=== Local taxes ===
Evans County has an 8% total sales tax, including 4% state, 1% local option, 1% special purpose, and 1% educational. Evans County is ranked 64 out of 71 Tier 1 counties in the state of Georgia. Claxton and Evans County exempt 100% on all classes of certain business inventory from property taxes.

== Culture ==
=== People ===
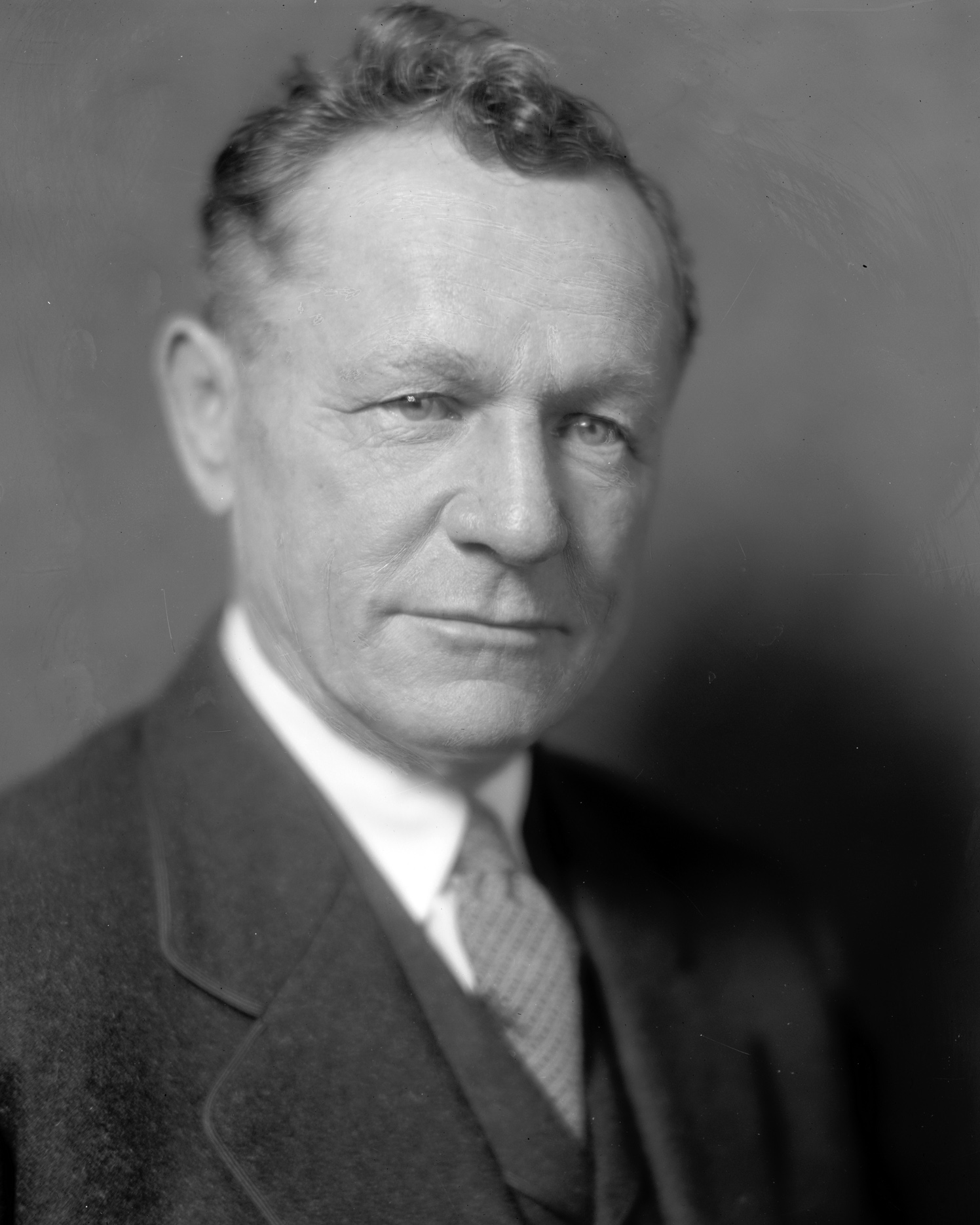
U.S. Representative from Hagan, Georgia

Evans County is populated by many different ethnic groups. Among these groups are Whites; Blacks or African Americans; Native Americans; Asians; Pacific Islanders; and Hispanics or Latinos. Foreign born Evans Countians are predominantly Mexican, followed by Filipinos; Guatemalans; Japanese; Indians; Germans; and Indonesians. The most common ancestries in Evans County include American; English; Irish; German; Scots-Irish; French; and Italian. The combination of these ancestries and ethnicities has forged Evans County's character.

==== Evans Countians ====
Evans County has had a number of notable citizens. James Kicklighter is a film director from Bellville, Georgia. Joseph Kennedy was born in Claxton and went on to become the senator for the area and president pro tempore of the Georgia State Senate. Albert Parker and Ira S. Womble Sr. both made Claxton and Evans County famous through their respective companies, The Claxton Bakery and The Georgia Fruitcake Company. Cartha Deke DeLoach, a native Evans Countian, joined the FBI and worked alongside J. Edgar Hoover while Dr. Curtis Gordon Hames did a groundbreaking study on heart disease. Two Evans County natives, Charles Gordon Edwards of Daisy, and William Washington Larsen of Hagan, went on to become United States Representatives.

=== Customs ===
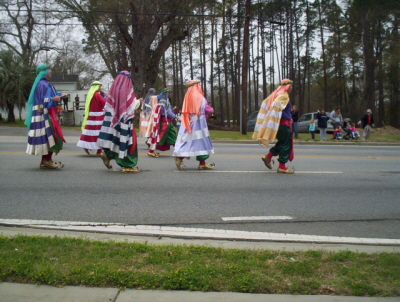
Shriners participating in the annual Rattlesnake Roundup Parade in Claxton, Evans County, Georgia

Evans County has held an annual rattlesnake roundup the second weekend of March since 1968, with the festival growing every year since then and moving from within Claxton to just outside the city in 2001; this festival has undergone a change and is now called the Claxton Rattlesnake and Wildlife Festival. Another, more recent, annual event is the Cruisin' in the Country Bike Ride, began in 1995 as the Yuletide Ride. The event was changed from December to November the next year and expanded to include a 65-mile (105 km) route. Soon, the route became a complete century ride.

Other events include the Martin Luther King Day parade, held every January; Christmas in Claxton, an event which occurs on the first Saturday in December and includes arts and crafts, food, and the Parade of Lights; barrel racing at the Richey Arena; and a tractor pull held on the first Saturday of each month at the Longneedle Farm Truck and Tractor Pull. A Chicken Pickin' festival was held September 11, 2010.

=== Cuisine ===
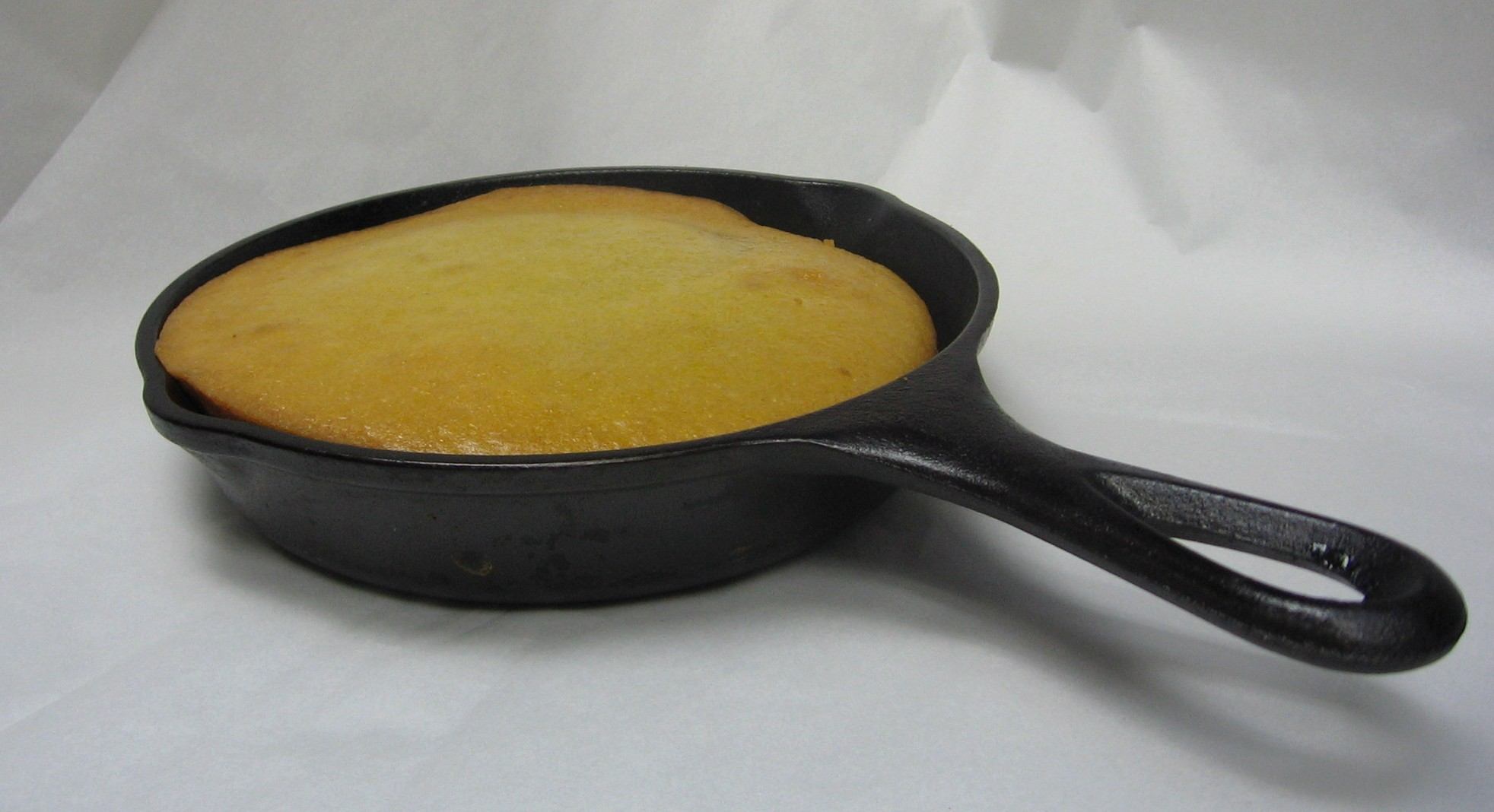
Skillet-baked cornbread

Evans County's cuisine includes a variety of different foods ranging from seafood, corn on the cob and chicken and dumplings to Brunswick stew, fried chicken and cornbread. Other well known and loved foods in the county include pecans, peaches and peanuts. However, these are not the only foods enjoyed by Evans Countians. Because of the diversity within the county, the people of Evans County also frequent Mexican and Chinese restaurants.

=== Architecture ===
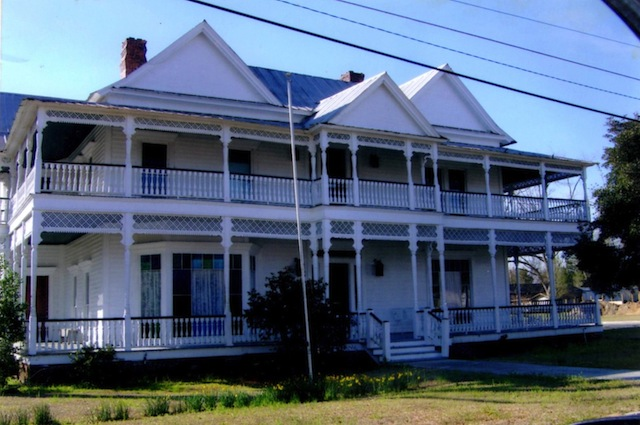
The George W. DeLoach House in Hagan, Georgia

A number of buildings and homes in Evans County are on the National Register of Historic Places. In Claxton, there is the Dr. James W. Daniel House; the Evans County Courthouse; and the Mitchell J. Green Plantation. In Hagan, there is the George W. DeLoach House. And at Camp Oliver there is the Glisson Store (DOE). Other places of interest include the Daisy Post Office and the train depot in Bellville.

Evans County is also home to a number of antebellum houses that were built prior to the formation of the county. Many of these homes were built in the Plantation Plain style and include the A.D. Eason House; the Thomas A. Durrence House; and the Edwards-Strickland House.

== Law and government ==
=== Politics ===
United States presidential election results for Evans County, Georgia
Year	Republican		Democratic		Third party(ies)	
Year	No.	%	No.	%	No.	%
1916	34	7.98%	334	78.40%	58	13.62%
1920	16	3.57%	432	96.43%	0	0.00%
1924	21	2.54%	790	95.41%	17	2.05%
1928	192	28.19%	489	71.81%	0	0.00%
1932	21	3.65%	548	95.14%	7	1.22%
1936	35	4.54%	733	95.07%	3	0.39%
1940	112	7.37%	1,399	92.04%	9	0.59%
1944	117	13.39%	756	86.50%	1	0.11%
1948	118	8.42%	953	67.97%	331	23.61%
1952	433	26.13%	1,224	73.87%	0	0.00%
1956	356	23.61%	1,152	76.39%	0	0.00%
1960	567	34.66%	1,069	65.34%	0	0.00%
1964	1,572	66.30%	799	33.70%	0	0.00%
1968	543	21.63%	492	19.60%	1,475	58.76%
1972	1,666	81.63%	375	18.37%	0	0.00%
1976	746	31.38%	1,631	68.62%	0	0.00%
1980	1,090	42.33%	1,456	56.54%	29	1.13%
1984	1,601	57.30%	1,193	42.70%	0	0.00%
1988	1,707	62.01%	1,023	37.16%	23	0.84%
1992	1,244	42.03%	1,230	41.55%	486	16.42%
1996	1,206	47.52%	1,117	44.01%	215	8.47%
2000	1,841	59.77%	1,217	39.51%	22	0.71%
2004	2,291	65.16%	1,213	34.50%	12	0.34%
2008	2,462	63.85%	1,374	35.63%	20	0.52%
2012	2,268	63.62%	1,268	35.57%	29	0.81%
2016	2,404	66.26%	1,130	31.15%	94	2.59%
2020	2,888	67.98%	1,324	31.17%	36	0.85%
2024	3,011	70.95%	1,214	28.61%	19	0.45%

United States Senate election results for Evans County, Georgia2
Year	Republican		Democratic		Third party(ies)	
Year	No.	%	No.	%	No.	%
2020	2,876	68.62%	1,251	29.85%	64	1.53%
2020	2,539	67.94%	1,198	32.06%	0	0.00%

United States Senate election results for Evans County, Georgia3
Year	Republican		Democratic		Third party(ies)	
Year	No.	%	No.	%	No.	%
2020	1,503	36.24%	791	19.07%	1,853	44.68%
2020	2,539	67.89%	1,201	32.11%	0	0.00%
2022	2,314	70.51%	968	29.49%	0	0.00%
2022	2,172	69.84%	938	30.16%	0	0.00%

Georgia Gubernatorial election results for Evans County
Year	Republican		Democratic		Third party(ies)	
Year	No.	%	No.	%	No.	%
2022	2,467	73.40%	882	26.24%	12	0.36%

=== Government ===
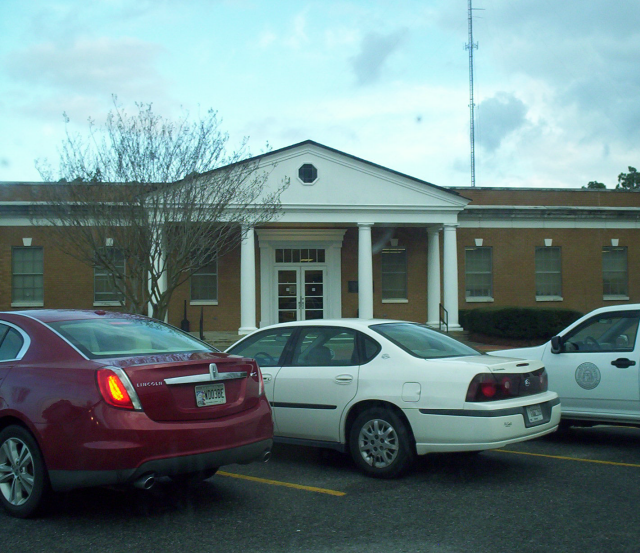
The courthouse annex in Claxton, Evans County, Georgia

The county government is a constitutional body and is granted powers by the Constitution of Georgia. Evans County has a board of commissioners, sheriff, tax commissioner and clerk of court. The original top positions were held by:

- H. Leonard Brewton—First County Commissioner (1915–1920)
- T. Walton Rogers—First County Sheriff (January 1, 1915 – February 24, 1920)
- T.J. Edwards—First County Tax Commissioner (January 1, 1933 – December 25, 1940)
- R.R. Tippins Sr.—First Clerk of Court (January 1, 1915 – December 31, 1920)

Individuals currently holding Constitutional Offices are:

- Mac Edwards—Sheriff
- Julie E. Mincey—Tax Commissioner
- Kathy P. Hendrix—Clerk of Court
- Darin McCoy-Judge of the Probate Court

Board of Commissioners: The board of commissioners in Evans County is made up of six members elected by the people and led by a chairman elected by the board. The board of commissioners acts as both the legislative and executive branches of government for the county and is charged with financing county programs and paying the salaries of constitutional officers.

The current members of the Board of Commissioners are:

- Sheila Holland – District 1
- Pratt Lockwood – District 2
- Tony Lewis – District 3
- L.E. Hewitt – District 4
- Neal Hammock – District 5
- Irene Burney – District 6

Tax Commissioner: The tax commissioner receives tax returns, maintains tax records for the county, and collects and pays tax funds to the state and local government.

Clerk of Court: The responsibility of the clerk of the court is to maintain court records and supervise registration of property transactions.

=== Law enforcement and emergency services ===
Sheriff: The sheriff maintains the peace in the county through enforcement of the law and provide judicial security and civil services of the court In Evans County, the sheriff is assisted by almost twenty employees

Fire department and EMS: The Evans County fire department is located in Claxton and has a fire chief, four dispatchers, and 21 volunteers. Ambulance services are provided by Evans County EMS. EMS has seven full-time employees and four part-time employees.

Evans County is represented in the Georgia General Assembly by State Senator Billy Hickman in Georgia's 4th Senate district and State Representative Bill Werkheiser in District 157. The county is represented in Congress by Rick Allen of Georgia's 12th congressional district.

== Media ==
The Claxton Enterprise is a weekly newspaper located in Claxton, Georgia, United States. It primarily serves Evans County, Georgia. The Enterprise was established in 1912 with its first issue being published on December 4, 1912.

Evans County has one local radio station, simultaneously broadcast on both the AM and FM bands. WCLA (1470 AM and 93.7 FM) offers CBS News each hour, while programming Adult Standards music. WCLA broadcasts Claxton High School and Pinewood Christian Academy football, basketball and baseball. WCLA is the Evans County affiliate for both University of Georgia Bulldog football and basketball, as well as Atlanta Braves baseball. The station observed its 57th birthday on July 30, 2015.

== Sports and recreation ==
Sports in Evans County include the Claxton High School athletic program and the Pinewood Christian Academy athletic program. Both schools programs include football; baseball; basketball; track and field; softball; and tennis. Claxton High School also has a golf program. Claxton's boys' track and field were Georgia High School Association champions in 1983 and the boys' basketball team were champions in 1988.

The county is home to a handful of public areas which are set aside for recreation. The Evans County Public Fishing Area, located in Claxton, is one such area and contains three lakes of 8, 30 and 84 acres and primitive campsites. Families can also picnic at the lake and an outdoor classroom is available for use. Parks include Bacon Ford Park and the Senior Citizens Park in Claxton. Two parks in Hagan are the Maggie Mae Lewis Children's Park and the Bradley Memorial Park.

Another outdoor recreational area is the Evans Heights Golf Club. The course was designed by Don Cottle Jr. in 1970 and has Bermuda grass. In total, the course is 6,514 yards.

== Infrastructure ==
=== Health care ===
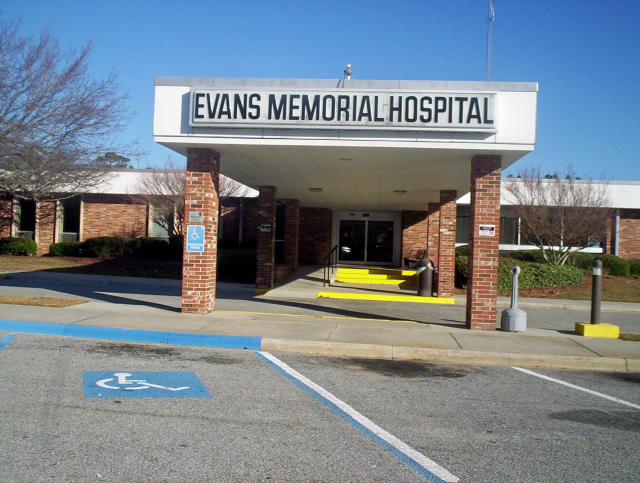
Side entrance to Evans Memorial Hospital in Claxton, Evans County, Georgia

Evans County has several medical facilities, including the Evans County Memorial Hospital; the Jack Strickland Rehabilitation Wellness Center; Northspring Assisted Living; The Griffin House; the Camellia Health and Rehabilitation Center; The Evans County Health Department and Health and Well-Being Consultative Services. There are approximately twelve doctors in the county, two dentists and two pharmacies.

=== Education ===
Evans County has both public and private schools.

Public education in most of Evans County is supervised by the Evans County School District for grades K-12, except parts in Fort Stewart. Fort Stewart has the Department of Defense Education Activity (DoDEA) as its local school district, for the elementary level. Students at the secondary level on Fort Stewart attend public schools operated by county school districts. The current superintendent of the public school district is Dr. Marty Waters.

All schools have been fully accredited by the Southern Association of Colleges and Schools as well as the Georgia Accrediting Commission. There are currently 1,888 students and 122 teachers, a ratio of 15:1. There are three public schools in Evans County: Claxton Elementary School; Claxton Middle School; and Claxton High School.

Pinewood Christian Academy is a co-educational private school in Bellville. Founded in 1970, the school has approximately 685 students and has a calendar year of 180 days with each school day lasting 7 hours.

=== Transportation ===
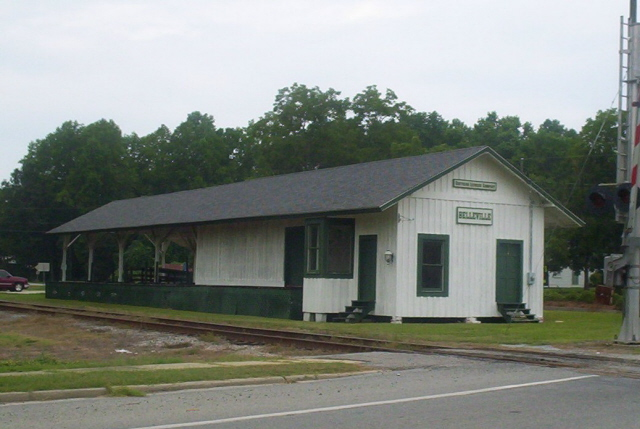
The Bellville train depot in Bellville

Transportation in Evans County is overseen by the Georgia Department of Transportation, a part of the executive branch of the state government. The major U.S. highways that run through Evans County are U.S. Route 25; U.S. Route 280; and U.S. Route 301. State highways running through Evans County are State Route 30; State Route 73; State Route 129; State Route 169; and State Route 292. Georgia Central Railway provides transportation for industrial customers in the county.

Air travel in Evans County is provided by the Claxton-Evans County Airport. The site for the airport was approved by the FAA in 1964 and it was activated in 1971; the airport is three miles (4.8 km) northeast of Claxton, Georgia. It is operated by the city of Claxton. It has a 5,000-foot (1,500 m) runway, hangars, pilot control lighting, and a Precision Approach Path Indicator. The Claxton-Evans County Airport has an elevation of 112 ft (34 m).

==== Major highways ====
- US 25 / US 301 / SR 73
- US 280 / SR 30
- SR 129
- SR 169
  - SR 169 Spur
- SR 292

=== Energy use and production ===
Evans County's electricity generation and consumption are provided through a variety of means. Natural gas is also available in large quantities. Evans Countians consumes 269,420 gallons of water a day out of a plant capacity of 3,720,000 gallons a day. There is an elevated storage capacity of 700,000 gallons. The energy produced and consumed is available through the Claxton-Evans County Industrial Park.

== See also ==
- National Register of Historic Places listings in Evans County, Georgia
- List of counties in Georgia
