= Georgia State Route 169 =

State highway in Georgia, United States

State Route 169
- Georgia State Route 169 highlighted in red

Route information
- Maintained by GDOT
- Length: 55.4 mi (89.2 km)

Major junctions
- South end: US 341 / SR 27 in Jesup
- US 280 / SR 30 in Bellville
- North end: US 25 / US 301 / SR 73 northeast of Claxton

Location
- Country: United States
- State: Georgia
- Counties: Wayne, Appling, Tattnall, Evans

Highway system
- Georgia State Highway System; Interstate; US; State; Special
← SR 168	→ SR 170

State Route 169 (SR 169) is a 55.4-mile-long (89.2 km) state highway that runs south-to-north through portions of Wayne, Appling, Tattnall, and Evans counties in the southeastern part of the U.S. state of Georgia.

== Route description ==
SR 169 begins at an intersection with US 341/SR 27 in Jesup, in Wayne County. It heads northwest through rural parts of the county, until it enters Appling County. Shortly after the county line is an intersection with SR 121, with SR 144 immediately afterward. The three highways head concurrently to the northeast. They cross over the Altamaha River into Tattnall County. They continue to the northeast, passing SR 178. A little farther to the northeast, SR 144 departs to the northeast, and then, SR 121 departs to the northwest. SR 169 continues to the northeast, intersecting SR 23/SR 57. It curves to the northwest and then heads northward, until it enters Evans County. In the town of Bellville, if first meets US 280/SR 30, and then SR 292. The highway continues to the north, intersects SR 169 Spur, and curves to the northeast. Almost immediately is SR 129, and then the Canoochee River. SR 169 continues to the northeast until it meets its northern terminus, an intersection with US 25/US 301/SR 73, northeast of Claxton.

SR 169 is not part of the National Highway System, a system of roadways important to the nation's economy, defense, and mobility.

== Major intersections ==
County	Location	mi	km	Destinations	Notes
Wayne	Jesup	0.0	0.0	US 341 / SR 27 (West Pine Street) – Brunswick, Baxley	Southern terminus
Appling		21.2	34.1	SR 121 south – Surrency	Southern end of SR 121 concurrency
Appling		21.3	34.3	SR 144 west – Baxley	Southern end of SR 144 concurrency
Altamaha River		22.0	35.4	John C. Beasley Bridge; Appling–Tattnall county line	
Tattnall		27.0	43.5	SR 178 west	Eastern terminus of SR 178
Tattnall		27.9	44.9	SR 144 east – Glennville	Northern end of SR 144 concurrency
Tattnall		28.1	45.2	SR 121 north – Reidsville	Northern end of SR 121 concurrency
Tattnall		32.9	52.9	SR 23 / SR 57 (Romie Waters Highway)	
Evans	Bellville	45.7	73.5	US 280 / SR 30	
Evans	Bellville	45.9	73.9	SR 292 – Lyons, Claxton	
Evans		48.9	78.7	SR 169 Spur north	Southern terminus of SR 169 Spur
Evans		49.3	79.3	SR 129 – Claxton, Metter	
Evans		49.9	80.3	Canoochee River	
Evans		55.4	89.2	US 25 / US 301 / SR 73	Northern terminus
1.000 mi = 1.609 km; 1.000 km = 0.621 mi: Concurrency terminus

== Spur route ==
State Route 169 Spur
- Location: Rural Evans County
- Length: 0.5 mi (800 m)

State Route 169 Spur (SR 169 Spur) is a 0.5-mile-long (0.80 km) spur route that exists entirely within the west central part of Evans County. Its route is located southwest of the Canoochee River.

It begins at an intersection with the SR 169 mainline north of Bellville. It heads north-northeast and curves to meet its northern terminus, at an intersection with SR 129 about 0.5 miles (0.80 km) later.

SR 169 Spur is not part of the National Highway System, a system of roadways important to the nation's economy, defense, and mobility.

The entire route is in Evans County.

Location	mi	km	Destinations	Notes
	0.0	0.0	SR 169 – Bellville	Southern terminus
	0.5	0.80	SR 129 – Claxton, Metter	Northern terminus
1.000 mi = 1.609 km; 1.000 km = 0.621 mi
