= Evans County Heart Study =

Long-term cardiovascular study

The Evans County Heart Study was a long-term cardiovascular study on residents of Evans County, Georgia. The study, which was funded by the National Institute of Health, began in July, 1958, and was last updated as recent as May 2016. It resulted in more than 560 published papers that ultimately showed the importance of HDL cholesterol. The study was conducted by Dr. Curtis Gordon Hames, a family doctor from Claxton, Georgia. The study took place in Evans Country because the area had a high death count due to heart complications, such as heart disease and other cardiovascular diseases. The studies showed that there was a significant abundance of heart conditions within a variety of ethnicities. People as young as fourteen and as old as seventy-four participated in the tests, and were divided into different age groups; however only males were eligible for the study. Anyone as old as one-hundred years old could be eligible, and any younger.

== Background ==
The study involved 6,596 people from Evans County and 3,921 people from Bulloch County. The study population from Evans county consisted of African-American and Caucasian males, ages 40–74, along with a 15-39 year old group that were involved in other studies. Then, the people were divided up into 10 random, equal in size, random samples. Also, a 50% random sample of the 15-39 year old group was taken by including people from the first five samples solely. By comprising this type of sampling, secular trends in disease patterns, along with possible aging of laboratory reagents were randomized.

The study was done in Evans County, Georgia. Evans County is located in the southeastern portion of the United States. It is situated on the coastal plain estimating around 60 miles inland from the seaport of Savannah, GA. Around half of the population lives on farms while the other half lives in meager little villages. An example is Claxton. Claxton is a town that has a population of 2,000, about 40 percent of which is black. The white population of Evans County was large enough to provide an adequate number for the study, but the black population was considered too small and some blacks from the Bulloch county were incorporated into this study.

== Goals and Methods ==
The study can be categorized as a cohort study due to the longevity of the research and its focus on the residents of Evans County, Georgia. It was the leader in the field of epidemiology to analyze effects and differences of coronary heart disease on race. The study aimed to determine how cardiovascular disease affected different races among a specific population. To determine the population size, a specific census was conducted in the county for the study during the first two months of 1960, recording 6,596 persons. From there, the study population included a total of 3,377 residents within Evans County. These residents included a group of randomly selected blacks and whites age 40-74 and an additional group of blacks were selected from Bulloch sub-County. A group of 15-39 year old residents were also selected into this group mainly to participate in other experiments as well. The study population was subsequently randomly divided into 10 groups.

The examination process consisted of two cardiovascular tests including "history and physical, blood pressure determination, standard electrocardiogram and chest X-ray, and cholesterol determination." Ninety-two percent of the study population responded with an examination process. Therefore, data from 3,102 residents was obtained through the process.

Using a prospective cohort model, the investigators sought to examine the entire population of the county aged over 40 years and half the population aged between 15 and 39 years. They ultimately achieved a 92% response rate for a total study population of 3,102 residents. From 1960 to 1962, each participant was given an initial examination in which serum cholesterol, blood pressure, weight, height and the participant's responses to a number of health behavior and medical history questions. A follow-up consisting of a similar battery of tests was completed from 1967 to 1969. For 90.9% of the study population, a physical similar to the preliminary one was completed. For another 7.9%, health status was ascertained by a phone survey of either subject or a family member. The total rate of follow-up was 98.8%. Factors assessed at the time of follow-up were systolic and diastolic blood pressure, serum cholesterol level, cigarette smoking, body weight, hematocrit value, ECG abnormalities and diet. Socioeconomic status was also assessed for whites, but not for blacks, as little variability was found in this factor among black subjects.

== Results/Conclusions ==
A central finding of the study was that, across race and social class differences, factors associated with increased risk of coronary heart disease (CHD) did so equally for blacks and whites whether the risk factors were considered singly or in combination. CHD incidence remained markedly higher for white Evans County residents. The only social grouping of white residents that had equally low incidence of CHD was white sharecroppers, which was attributed to higher rates of physical activity among sharecroppers when compared to whites of higher socioeconomic status.

A strength of the study was the high response rate of the population in its entirety, one of only two of its kind to successfully examine an entire community. The publication of the initial study results did not include statistical analysis. Hames attributes his decision to avoid statistical analysis to the unique design of the study. He wrote, “…it certainly is not clear to us [the investigators] what differences such tests could make in our interpretations in the context of this study… the population over 40 does not constitute a sample of some universe. They are a universe.”
