= Georgia State Route 129 =

State highway in Georgia, United States

State Route 129
- Georgia State Route 129 highlighted in red

Route information
- Maintained by GDOT
- Length: 26.78 mi (43.10 km)

Major junctions
- South end: Old Hwy. 250/John Todd Road near Claxton
- North end: SR 46 in Metter

Location
- Country: United States
- State: Georgia
- Counties: Evans, Tattnall, Candler

Highway system
- Georgia State Highway System; Interstate; US; State; Special
← US 129	→ SR 130

State Route 129 (SR 129) is a 26.78-mile-long (43.10 km) state highway that travels southeast-to-northwest through portions of Evans, Tattnall, and Candler counties in the east-central part of the U.S. state of Georgia. It connects the towns of Claxton and Metter.

== Route description ==
SR 129 begins just northwest of Fort Stewart, in rural Evans County, at an intersection with Old Hwy. 250 (former SR 250) and John Todd Road. The highway then heads northwest to an intersection with US 280/SR 30 (West Main Street) in Claxton, still within Evans County. It heads northwest to meet SR 169 and SR 169 Spur, north-northeast of Bellville. The highway continues to the northwest, cuts across the extreme northeastern corner of Tattnall County, and enters Candler County. SR 129 continues to the northwest and then curves to the north-northeast for just over 2 miles (3.2 km), crossing over the Canoochee River along the way. After that, the highway heads northwest again for about 1 mile (1.6 km). During this stretch, it crosses over, but does not have an interchange with, Interstate 16 (Jim Gillis Historic Savannah Parkway). The roadway turns northward into Metter. It continues to the north until it meets its northern terminus, an intersection with SR 46 (East Broad Street).

SR 129 is not part of the National Highway System, a system of roadways important to the nation's economy, defense, and mobility.

== Major intersections ==
County	Location	mi	km	Destinations	Notes
Evans		0.000	0.000	Old Hwy. 250 / John Todd Road	Southern terminus
Evans	Claxton	6.023	9.693	US 280 east / SR 30 east (East Main Street) – Pembroke	Southern end of US 280/SR 30 concurrency
Evans	Claxton	6.233	10.031	US 25 / US 301 / SR 73 (Duval Street) – Glennville, Statesboro	
Evans	Claxton	6.808	10.956	US 280 west / SR 30 west (West Main Street) – Reidsville	Northern end of US 280/SR 30 concurrency
Evans		10.814	17.403	SR 169 – Bellville	
Evans		11.113	17.885	SR 169 Spur south	Northern terminus of SR 169 Spur
Tattnall	No major junctions				
Candler	Metter	26.783	43.103	SR 46 (East Broad Street) – Oak Park, Pulaski	Northern terminus
1.000 mi = 1.609 km; 1.000 km = 0.621 mi
