= Miller Lil' Rascal =

Lil' Rascal

General information
- Type: Sporting biplane
- Manufacturer: homebuilt
- Designer: Merle Miller
- Number built: 1

History
- First flight: 1979

The Miller Lil' Rascal was a two-seat sporting biplane built by high school students in Claxton, Evans County, Georgia, USA, in the late 1970s. Construction began in November 1975 by a group of 15 students at Claxton High School under the direction of B. G. Tippins. Of conventional biplane configuration, it accommodated pilot and passenger side-by-side in an open cockpit. The wings were of dacron-covered wood, and the fuselage was of dacron-covered welded steel tube construction. It had fixed tailwheel undercarriage with spatted mainwheels.

Designer Merle Miller originally intended to market plans for the aircraft through his firm Aeroneering Inc, but abandoned the idea before any were sold. The single prototype (registration N11LR) was the only example produced.

== Specifications ==
General characteristics

- Crew: one pilot
- Capacity: 1 passenger
- Length: 15 ft 3 in (4.65 m)
- Wingspan: 20 ft 8 in (6.30 m)
- Height: 5 ft 6 in (1.66 m)
- Wing area: 126 sq ft (11.7 m^{2})
- Empty weight: 650 lb (295 kg)
- Gross weight: 1,100 lb (499 kg)
- Powerplant: 1 × Continental C85 horizontally opposed four-cylinder piston engine , 85 hp (64 kW)

Performance

- Maximum speed: 100 mph (161 km/h, 87 kn)
