= The Georgia Fruitcake Company =

American confectionary company

- Company type: Private
- Industry: confectionery
- Founder: Ira S. Womble, Sr.
- Headquarters: Claxton, Georgia, United States
- Products: fruitcakes
- Website: www.georgiafruitcakecompany.com

The Georgia Fruitcake Company is a confectionery company based in Claxton, Georgia.

== History ==
The Georgia Fruitcake Company was founded by Ira S. Womble, Sr. of Claxton. Womble began his career in the bakery business as an apprentice to Savino Gillio-Tos, the founder and owner of The Claxton Bakery, where he worked alongside Albert Parker, the future owner of the bakery and the person who would take The Claxton Bakery worldwide. After completing his apprenticeship, Womble moved to Clearwater, Florida during the Great Depression to run a federal bakery. It was there that he met automobile magnate Henry Ford. Ford eventually set Womble up with a bakery in Richmond Hill, Georgia to work on creating soy-based products. In 1948, Womble moved back to Claxton and opened The Georgia Fruitcake Company.

== Sales ==
The company produces over 5 million pounds of fruitcake annually.
