= Jennie, Georgia =

Unincorporated community in Central Georgia, U.S.

Coordinates: 32°03′03″N 81°53′20″W

Jennie is an unincorporated community in Evans and Tattnall counties, in the U.S. state of Georgia.

== History ==
The community was named after the Jennie Bradley (née Grice), the daughter of a local merchant and mill owner.
