= Joe Kennedy (Georgia politician) =

American politician

Member of the Georgia State Senate from the 4th district
- In office January 9, 1967 – January 14, 1991
- Preceded by: B. Avant Edenfield
- Succeeded by: Jack Hill

Personal details
- Born: Joseph Everett Kennedy; October 8, 1930 Claxton, Georgia, U.S.
- Died: January 19, 1997 (aged 66) Claxton, Georgia, U.S.
- Party: Democratic
- Spouse: Lalah Kennedy (m. 1953)
- Education: Georgia Military College
- Occupation: Accountant

Joseph Everett Kennedy (October 8, 1930 – June 19, 1997) was a Georgia State Senator born in Claxton, Georgia, United States.

== Biography ==
=== Personal life ===
Kennedy attended Claxton schools and graduated from Claxton High School in 1947. After graduation he attended Georgia Military College where he graduated in 1949. Following his time at GMC, Kennedy became a 2nd lieutenant in the United States Army. He was the recipient of the Korean Service Medal, United Nations Medal, Bronze Star, and two Battle Stars.

On December 25, 1953, Joseph Kennedy married Lalah Kennedy of Tattnall County. Kennedy would later be heavily influenced by his father-in-law, the Honorable J. Cliff Kennedy, who was involved in the government of the State of Georgia. Kennedy became very involved in his community. He was a member of the Claxton Jaycees and the Democratic Party. He was a Shriner of the Alee Temple Lodge of Savannah and the Director of the Tippins Bank and Trust Company of Claxton as well as the Director of the Evans County Chamber of Commerce.

=== Georgia Senator ===
In 1966 Joe Kennedy was elected to the Senate's Fourth District, where he served for twenty-four years. During his time in the Senate, he was Chairman of the Senate Offender Rehabilitation Committee for 12 years and was appointed to the Criminal Justice Improvement Council in 1981. He was a member of the Appropriations Committee, serving on the Continuation Subcommittee and the Conference Committee on Appropriations; the senator was also a part of the Agricultural Committee. Senator Kennedy attained his highest rank in the senate during the Governorship of Joe Frank Harris when he served as President Pro Tempore of the Senate from 1983 to 1991. He was given the job of executive assistant to the commissioner of the Department of Corrections in 1991; from 1991 to 1994 he directed an inmate labor program which put inmates to work on public building projects.

During his life, both prior to and during his service as a senator, Kennedy received many awards. He was the Jaycees' Young Man of the Year (1962); was given the Legislative Award from the Georgia Municipal Association (1985). He was the Legislator of the Year from the Georgia Recreation and Parks Society and the Georgia Association of Retarded Citizens (1983). The Hospital Corporation of America and the Georgia Rehabilitation Association, among many other organizations, recognized him for his hard work during his tenure as senator. Senator Joe Kennedy was instrumental in helping to create Ogeechee Technical College.

== See also ==
- List of people from Georgia (U.S. state)
