= Claxton High School =

Public high school in Georgia, United States

Location
- 102 N. Clark Street; Claxton, (Evans County), Georgia 30417; United States
- Coordinates: 32°9′47.99″N 81°54′59.29″W

Information
- Type: Public
- School district: Evans County School District
- Principal: Paul Mizell
- Teaching staff: 31.90 (FTE)
- Grades: 9–12
- Enrollment: 488 (2023-2024)
- Student to teacher ratio: 15.30
- Colors: Black and gold
- Mascot: Tiger
- Nickname: Tigers
- Accreditation: Southern Association of Colleges and Schools, Georgia Accrediting Commission
- Website: https://www.evans.k12.ga.us/page/claxton-high-school-c

Claxton High School is a public high school located in Claxton, Georgia, United States. It is a part of the Evans County School District. The current principal is Dr. Paul Mizell. Between 1975 and 1979, students at the school under the direction of B. G. Tippins built and flew a biplane of unique design, the Claxton High School Lil' Rascal.

== Athletics ==
GHSA Championships
Year	Class	Sport
1983	AA	Track (boys')
1988	AA	Basketball (boys')

The school's athletic teams are known as the Claxton Tigers, and they compete in the Georgia High School Association's Region 3-A (Division A). Tiger sports teams include:

- Baseball
- Basketball
- Football
- Golf
- Softball
- Tennis
- Track and field
