= The Claxton Enterprise =

- Type: Weekly newspaper
- Format: Broadsheet
- Owner: CherryRoad Media
- Publisher: Mitchell Peace
- Editor: Mitchell Peace
- Founded: 1912
- Language: English
- Headquarters: 24 South Newton Street; Claxton, GA 30417; United States
- Website: claxtonenterprise.com

The Claxton Enterprise is a weekly newspaper located in Claxton, Georgia, USA. It primarily served Evans County, Georgia. The Enterprise was first published on December 4, 1912. Owner Mickey Peace announced in 2024 that the paper will cease. However, the paper did not close and was acquired by CherryRoad Media in 2026.
