= Deke DeLoach =

Deputy FBI director (1920-2013

Cartha "Deke" DeLoach
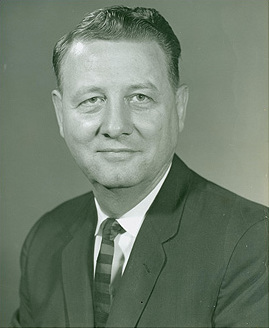

Associate Deputy Director of the Federal Bureau of Investigation
- In office July 10, 1963 – July 9, 1970
- President: John F. Kennedy; Lyndon Johnson; Richard Nixon
- Director: J. Edgar Hoover

Personal details
- Born: July 20, 1920 Claxton, Georgia
- Died: March 13, 2013 (aged 92) Hilton Head Island, South Carolina
- Parent: Cartha Calhoun DeLoach
- Education: Stetson University

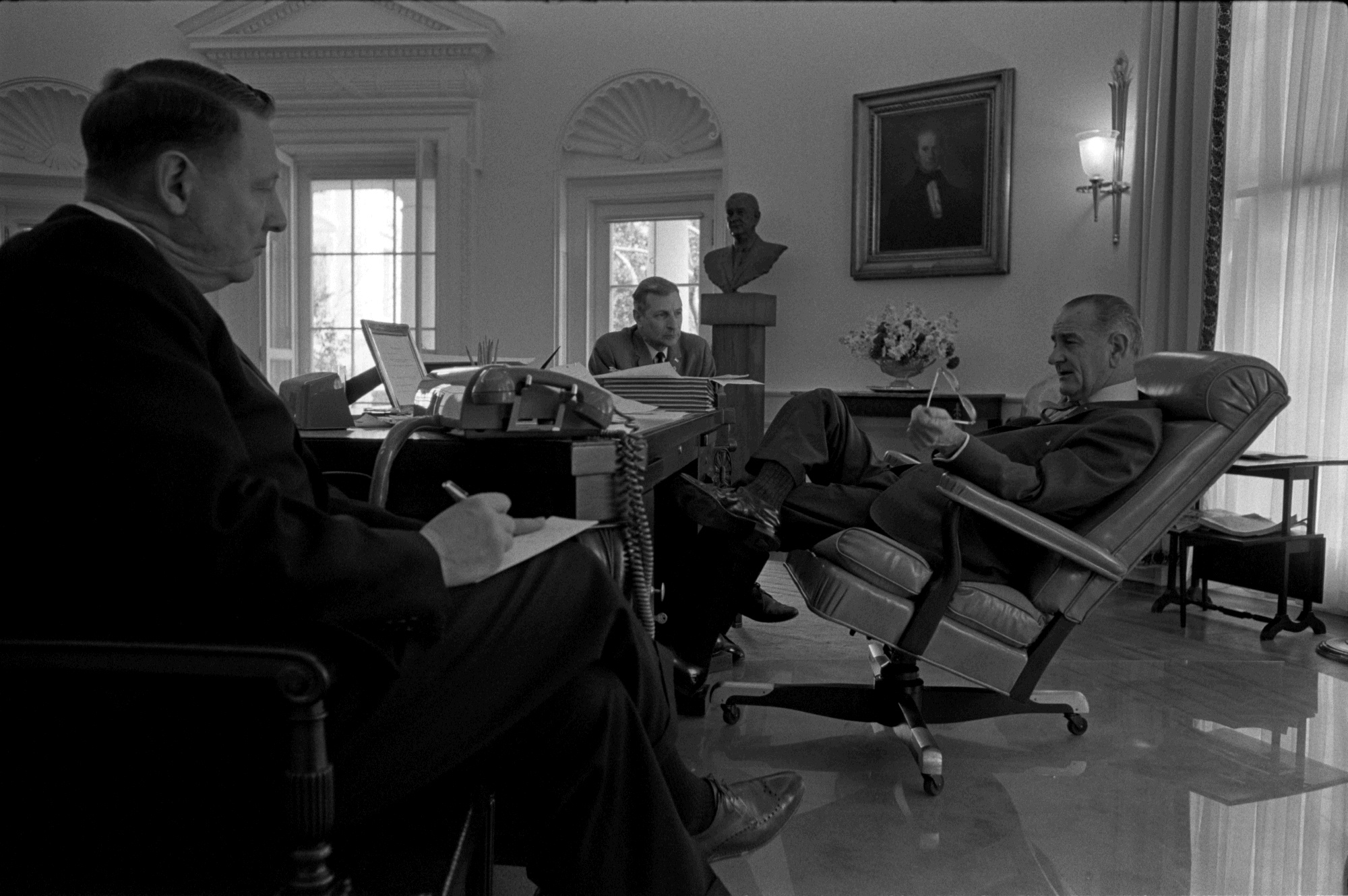
DeLoach with President Lyndon B. Johnson in the Oval Office, March 3, 1966

Cartha Dekle DeLoach (July 20, 1920 – March 13, 2013), known as Deke DeLoach, was associate deputy director of the Federal Bureau of Investigation (FBI) of the United States. During his post, DeLoach was the third most senior official in the FBI after J. Edgar Hoover and Clyde Tolson.

== Early life ==
DeLoach was born July 20, 1920, in Claxton, Georgia, the only child of Cartha Calhoun DeLoach. His father, a merchant, died when DeLoach was ten years old. He attended Gordon Military College, South Georgia College and Stetson University.

== FBI ==
In his book, “The Secrets of the FBI” national security journalist Ronald Kessler reported an incident in which a highly placed congressional staffer believed that DeLoach attempted blackmail using derogatory information from the agency's files.:

Roy L. Elson, administrative assistant to U.S. Sen. Carl T. Hayden, experienced [FBI blackmail] first-hand. FBI Director J. Edgar Hoover wanted an additional appropriation for the new FBI building on Pennsylvania Avenue. Elson had reservations about the request, but Cartha D. “Deke” DeLoach, one of the FBI’s top officials, met with him and “hinted” that he had “information that was unflattering and detrimental to my marital situation and that the senator might be disturbed,” Elson told me for my book.

“I was certainly vulnerable that way,” Elson said. “The implication was there was information about my sex life. There was no doubt in my mind what he was talking about.”

Elson suggested that they both tell Hayden, who headed the Senate Appropriations Committee, about his affair.

“Bring the photos if you have them,” Elson told DeLoach.

“At that point,” Elson recalled, “He started backing off … He said, ‘I’m only joking. Bullshit,' ” Elson said. “I interpreted it as attempted blackmail.”

DeLoach retired from the FBI in 1970, going on to become Vice-President for Corporate Affairs at Pepsi. He held this position for fifteen years before involving himself in banking in South Carolina.
