= Lobelia boykinii =

Scientific classification
- Kingdom: Plantae
- Clade: Tracheophytes
- Clade: Angiosperms
- Clade: Eudicots
- Clade: Asterids
- Order: Asterales
- Family: Campanulaceae
- Genus: Lobelia
- Species: L. boykinii

Binomial name
- Lobelia boykinii Torr. & A.Gray ex A.DC.

Species of flowering plant

== Name ==
Lobelia boykinii (L. boykinii) is a species of flowering plant in the bellflower family known by the common name Boykin’s lobelia.

== Taxonomic History ==
Lobelia boykinii appears to have been first described in the 1830s. Correspondence between A.W. Chapman and Dr. John Torrey, detailing plant shipments, mentions finding a new species of lobelia. The species was then included in Volume 7 of Prodromus Systematis Naturalis Regni Vegetabilis, an herbarium compiled by Augustin Pyramus de Candolle and Alphonse de Candolle. The name for the species was proposed by botanists John Torrey and Asa Gray for the botanist who collected the original specimen in Georgia, Dr. Samuel Boykin. This species has also been known as Dortmanna boykinii when German botanist Otto Kuntze proposed moving the genus Lobelia into Dortmanna in Volume 2 of Revisio Generum Plantarum in 1891.

== Structure and Appearance ==
The Lobelia boykinii has a perennial growth form. Its leaves are alternate and needlelike, and they typically fall before the plant flowers. Flowers bloom in May, June, and July, in white or blue. Its stem is hollow and tall, about 40-85 cm in height, with few branches.

Distribution Map of Lobelia boykinii

== Distribution and Habitat ==
The Lobelia boykinii is endemic to coastal plain wetlands in the Mid-Atlantic and southeastern United States. It can be found in coastal plain intermittent ponds, cypress-gum depressions or ponds, limesink ponds, depressions in wet pine savannas and flatwoods, Carolina bays, depression meadows, borrow pits, and bogs.

== Ecological Interactions ==
This plant relies on insect cross-pollination between genotypes of a population, resulting in limited seed production. It is threatened by herbivory deer and rabbits, as well as hog wallows degrading their habitat. Additionally, during its flowering period, fungal infections from Altenaria and Botrytis cinerea may impact sexual reproduction.

== Uses ==
While this species is not explicitly stated to have any uses or affects, the genus Lobelia as a whole has historically been used medicinally. They contain many useful compounds such as lobeline. Because of this, many plants within the Genus lobelia have been used as stimulants, diuretics, and respiratory treatments. It has been found to reduce inflammation and increase the rate of respiration. In many cases, it is either chewed or smoked to yield results.

== Conservation ==
The global conservation status of Lobelia boykinii is G2, which classifies it as imperiled. The definitions of rank at the state level include S1, which means it is critically imperiled in the state due to extreme rarity (often 5 or fewer occurrences) or very vulnerable to extirpation; S2, which means it is imperiled in the state because of rarity (often 6 to 20 occurrences) or factors making it vulnerable to extirpation; and SH, which means it is historically known from the state, with the expectation that it may still be rediscovered, though no current verified extant occurrences are documented.

| State | State Rank |
|---|---|
| Alabama | S1 |
| Delaware | S1 |
| Florida | S1 |
| Georgia | S2 |
| Mississippi | S1 |
| New Jersey | SH |
| North Carolina | S1 |
| South Carolina | S2 |

One threat to Lobelia boykinii is the reduction of insect pollinators caused by pesticide spraying. Another threat is habitat loss and degradation, which is caused by clearing, draining, or filling of wetlands; destruction of wetland transition zones; and development. An additional threat is hydrologic alterations, which lower the water table, and surrounding plantations and agricultural land can decrease aquifers. Lack of beneficial disturbance, such as fire suppression as opposed to having prescribed fires, has also caused concerns for Lobelia boykinii.

Lobelia boykinii was listed as a Species of Greatest Conservation Need (SGCN) in Georgia’s State Wildlife Action Plan (SWAP) in 2015 and 2025. According to the SWAP 2025 Threat Matrix, the threats to Lobelia boykinii are (1) biological resource use, (2) natural systems modifications, and (3) agriculture and aquaculture. The SWAP 2025 Conservation Actions for Lobelia boykinii are (1) improve habitat using prescribed fire, (2) restore or enhance habitat, (3) protect key populations using land acquisition or easements, and (4) reassess the conservation status of SGCN before the next revision of Georgia’s SWAP.
