= List of former state routes in Georgia =

There are three lists of former state routes in the U.S. state of Georgia:

- List of former state routes in Georgia (1–199)
- List of former state routes in Georgia (200–699)
- List of former state routes in Georgia (700–1109)

== See also ==
- List of state routes in Georgia
