= Daisy, Georgia =

- City
- Location in Evans County and the state of Georgia
- Coordinates: 32°9′0″N 81°50′9″W
- Country: United States
- State: Georgia
- County: Evans

Area
  - Total: 1.02 sq mi (2.64 km^{2})
  - Land: 0.96 sq mi (2.49 km^{2})
  - Water: 0.054 sq mi (0.14 km^{2})
- Elevation: 151 ft (46 m)

Population (2020)
  - Total: 159
  - Density: 165.2/sq mi (63.77/km^{2})
- Time zone: UTC-5 (Eastern (EST))
  - Summer (DST): UTC-4 (EDT)
- ZIP code: 30423
- Area code: 912
- FIPS code: 13-21268
- GNIS feature ID: 0355421

Daisy is a city in Evans County, Georgia, United States. The population was 159 in 2020.

== History ==
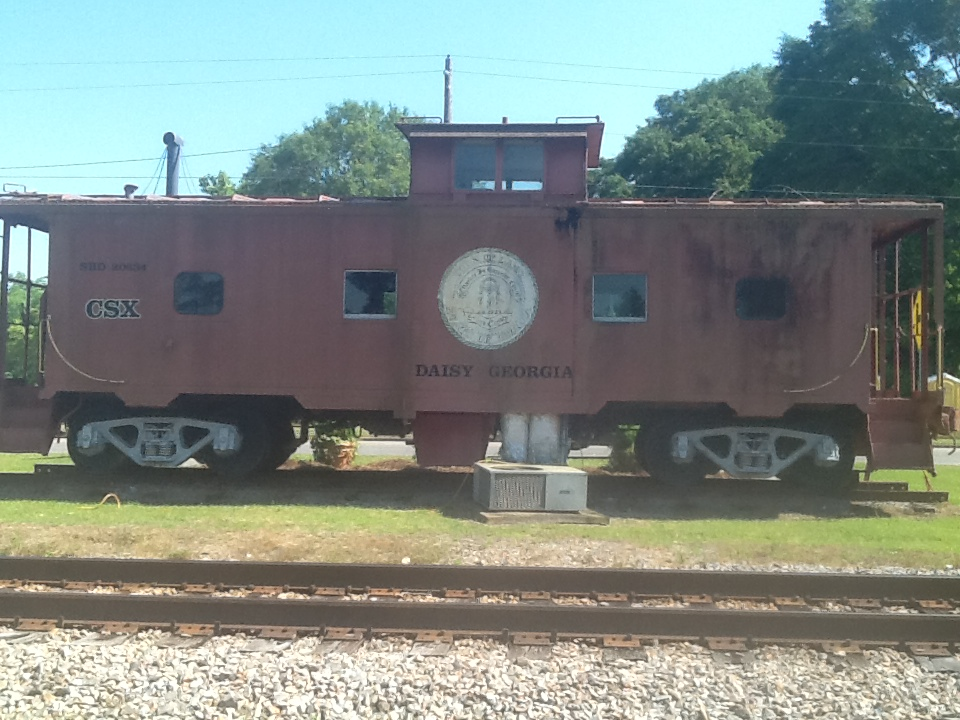
The caboose in Daisy, Georgia, which commemorates the importance of the railroad to Daisy's history.

The city of Daisy, Georgia was established in 1890, the same year that the Savannah and Western Railroad built a railroad line through the area. The town was going to be known as Conley, in honor of Rev. W.F. Conley, a Methodist minister, but the postal service rejected the application for a post office on May 17, 1890, because of the existence of another Conley, Georgia. The people of the community then decided on Daisy, naming their town for Daisy Leola Edwards, daughter of Thomas Jefferson Edwards and the granddaughter of W.F. Conley. The application for a post office under this name was made on July 14, 1890, and approved on August 26, 1890.

== Geography ==
Daisy is located at 32°9′0″N 81°50′9″W (32.150060, −81.835823).

According to the United States Census Bureau, the city has a total area of 1.0 square mile (2.6 km^{2}), of which 1.0 square mile (2.6 km^{2}) is land and 0.04 square miles (0.10 km^{2}) (2.94%) is water.

=== Climate ===
Daisy has a humid subtropical climate according to the Köppen classification. The city has hot and humid summers with average highs of 94 degrees and lows of 70 degrees in July. Winters are mild with average January highs of 61 degrees and lows of 36 degrees. Winter storms are rare, but they can happen on occasion.

Climate data for Daisy
Month	Jan	Feb	Mar	Apr	May	Jun	Jul	Aug	Sep	Oct	Nov	Dec	Year
Record high °F (°C)	81 (27)	86 (30)	89 (32)	96 (36)	98 (37)	106 (41)	107 (42)	105 (41)	104 (40)	96 (36)	87 (31)	84 (29)	107 (42)
Mean daily maximum °F (°C)	61 (16)	66 (19)	73 (23)	78 (26)	86 (30)	91 (33)	94 (34)	92 (33)	87 (31)	80 (27)	71 (22)	63 (17)	79 (26)
Mean daily minimum °F (°C)	36 (2)	39 (4)	44 (7)	50 (10)	59 (15)	67 (19)	71 (22)	70 (21)	65 (18)	54 (12)	45 (7)	38 (3)	53 (12)
Record low °F (°C)	−2 (−19)	13 (−11)	16 (−9)	28 (−2)	41 (5)	48 (9)	58 (14)	56 (13)	45 (7)	30 (−1)	22 (−6)	13 (−11)	−2 (−19)
Average precipitation inches (mm)	4.36 (111)	3.57 (91)	3.25 (83)	2.95 (75)	3.21 (82)	5.12 (130)	4.68 (119)	5.41 (137)	3.73 (95)	3.87 (98)	2.49 (63)	3.17 (81)	3.82 (97)
Source: The Weather Channel

== Demographics ==
Historical population
Census	Pop.	Note	%±
1930	214		—
1940	294		37.4%
1950	195		−33.7%
1960	229		17.4%
1970	150		−34.5%
1980	174		16.0%
1990	138		−20.7%
2000	126		−8.7%
2010	129		2.4%
2020	159		23.3%
U.S. Decennial Census

As of the census of 2000, there were 126 people, 53 households, and 33 families residing in the city. By 2020, its population grew to 159.
