= Evans County School District =

School district in Georgia (U.S. state)

Location
- Claxton, Georgia

District information
- Type: Urban Public
- Motto: A Commitment to Excellence
- Grades: PK-12
- Superintendent: Dr. Marty Waters

Students and staff
- Students: 1,945

Other information
- Accreditation: Southern Association of Colleges and Schools; Georgia Accrediting Commission
- Website: www.evans.k12.ga.us

The Evans County School District is a school district based in Evans County, Georgia, United States. The superintendent is Dr. Marty Waters.

All of the schools have been accredited by the Southern Association of Colleges and Schools as well as the Georgia Accrediting Commission. There are 1,888 students and 122 teachers, a ratio of 15:1.

It serves grades K-12 in the county, except parts in Fort Stewart. Fort Stewart has the Department of Defense Education Activity (DoDEA) as its local school district, for the elementary level. Students at the secondary level on Fort Stewart attend public schools operated by county school districts.

== Schools ==
=== Claxton Elementary School ===
Claxton Elementary School is a public grade school (grades PK-5) in the town of Claxton, Evans County, Georgia, United States, and part of the Evans County School District. In 2005 it had 898 students, and 52 teachers with a ratio of 1:17 while the state ratio was 1:16. The students were 43% white, 45% African-American, and 12% Hispanic. 63% of students were eligible for free lunch, over the state average of 43%; 14% of students were eligible for reduced lunch, over the state average of 9%; and 11% of students were migrants, compared to a state average of 1%.

=== Claxton Middle School ===
Claxton Middle School is a middle school (grades 6-8) in the town of Claxton, Evans County, Georgia, United States, and part of the Evans County School District. In 2005 it had 473 students, and 39 teachers with a ratio of 1:12 while the state ratio was 1:16. The students were 40% white, 49% African-American, 10% Hispanic and 1% Asian. 65% of students were eligible for free lunch, over the state average of 43%; 15% of students were eligible for reduced lunch, over the state average of 9%; and 7% of students were migrants, compared to a state average of 1%.

=== Claxton High School ===
Claxton High School is a high school (grades 9-12) in the town of Claxton, Evans County, Georgia, United States, and part of the Evans County School District. In 2005 it had 517 students, and 30 teachers with a ratio of 1:17 while the state ratio was 1:16. The students were 53% white, 44% African-American, and 3% Hispanic. 50% of students were eligible for free lunch, over the state average of 43%; 13% of students were eligible for reduced lunch, over the state average of 9%; and 3% of students were migrants, compared to a state average of 1%.
