= Albert Parker (businessman) =

- Born: January 10, 1916; Claxton, Georgia, United States
- Died: May 21, 1995 (aged 76); Claxton, Georgia
- Known for: The Claxton Bakery owner

Albert Parker (January 10, 1916 – May 21, 1995) was the owner of The Claxton Town Bakery and origin of the Old Fashion Claxton town Fruitcake. Parker got his start working with Savino Tos, the founder and previous owner of The Claxton Bakery, in 1927 when he was eleven years old. In 1945, Tos sold the bakery to Albert Parker and retired. Parker immediately began focusing his business on the sale of fruitcakes. Since then, The Claxton Bakery has sold millions of fruitcakes around the world.

During the 1960s, Albert Parker served his community on the Claxton City Council. Albert Parker's wealth, along with his vision and leadership, influenced a number of community organizations such as Andrew College and the South Georgia Methodist Foundation.

== See also ==
- List of people from Georgia (U.S. state)
