= Canoochee River =

River in Georgia, United States

Coordinates: 31.98187°N 81.30900°W

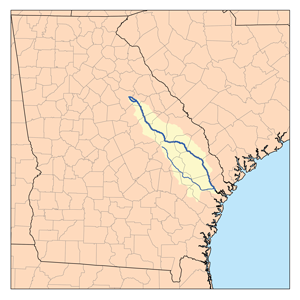
Map of the Ogeechee River watershed showing the Canoochee River

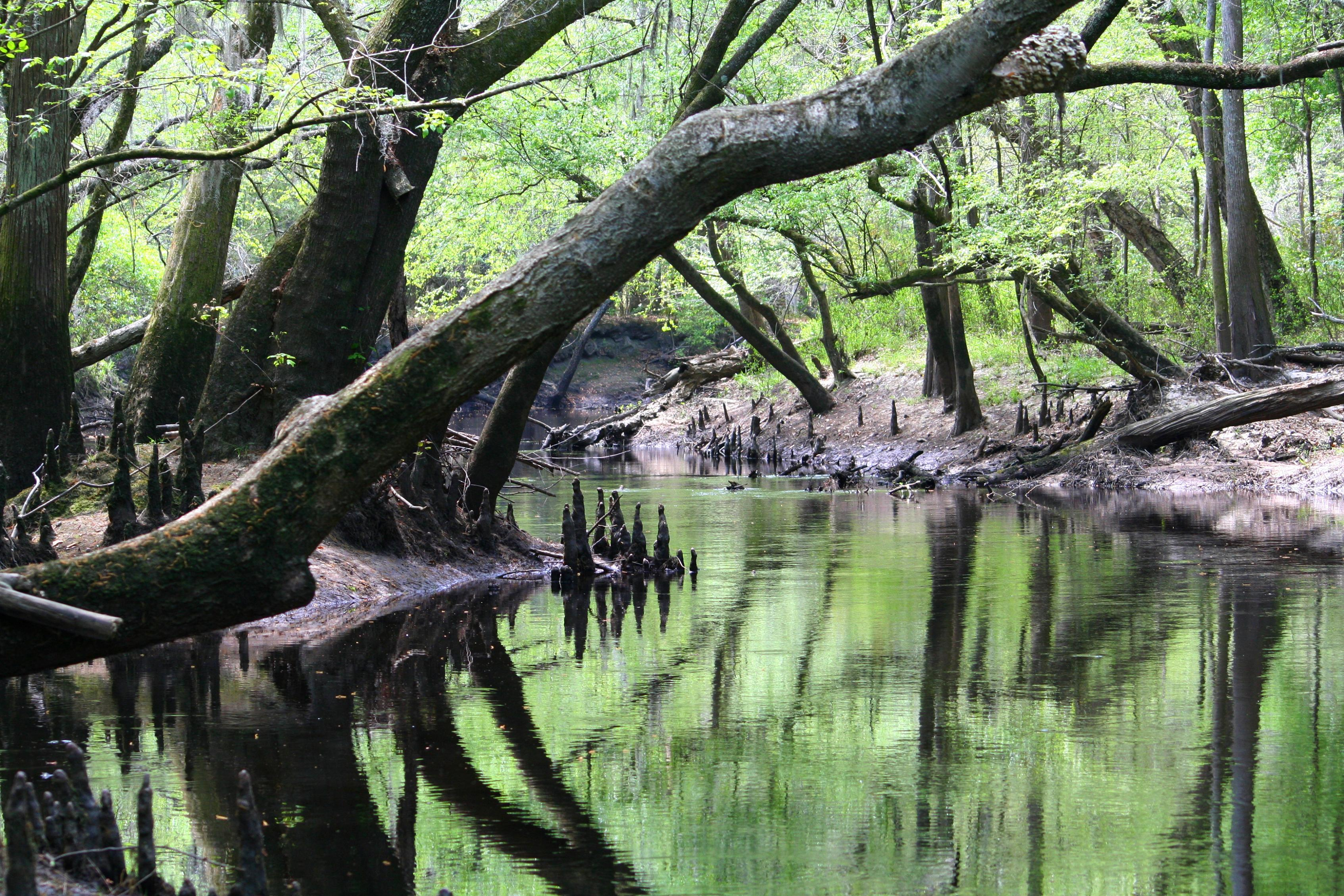
Canoochee River

The Canoochee River (pronounced kuh-NOO-chee) is a 108-mile-long (174 km) river in southeastern Georgia in the United States. It is a tributary of the Ogeechee River, which flows to the Atlantic Ocean. In 1738 the Trustees of the colony mentioned the proposed house and ferry boat over the 'Cooanoochi River'.

== Course ==
The Canoochee River is formed about 12 miles (19 km) southeast of Swainsboro in southwestern Emanuel County by the confluence of Canoochee Creek and Little Canoochee Creek, and flows generally southeastwardly through or along the boundaries of Candler, Evans, Bryan, and Liberty counties, through Fort Stewart. It joins the Ogeechee River from the west in Bryan County, 15 miles (24 km) south-southwest of Savannah.

== Name origin ==
"Canoochee" may be a name derived from the Muscogee language, meaning "little ground". The United States Board on Geographic Names settled on "Canoochee River" as the stream's preferred spelling in 1910. According to the Geographic Names Information System, variant names have included:

- Cannochee River
- Cannoochee River
- Cannouchee River
- Canoche River
- Canochee River
- Canoochee Creek
- Canouchee River
- Canouchie River
- Canuche River
- Connochee River
- Conoche River
- Conoochee River
- Coonoche River
- Coonnoochie River
- Connouchee Creek

== See also ==
- List of Georgia rivers

== Sources ==
- Columbia Gazetteer of North America entry
- DeLorme (2003). Georgia Atlas & Gazetteer. Yarmouth, Maine: DeLorme. ISBN 0-89933-253-6.
