= Hagan, Georgia =

City in the United States

- City
- Location in Evans County and the state of Georgia
- Coordinates: 32°9′19″N 81°55′55″W
- Country: United States
- State: Georgia
- County: Evans

Area
  - Total: 2.15 sq mi (5.58 km^{2})
  - Land: 2.05 sq mi (5.30 km^{2})
  - Water: 0.11 sq mi (0.28 km^{2})
- Elevation: 190 ft (58 m)

Population (2020)
  - Total: 959
  - Density: 469.1/sq mi (181.11/km^{2})
- Time zone: UTC-5 (Eastern (EST))
  - Summer (DST): UTC-4 (EDT)
- ZIP code: 30429
- Area code: 912
- FIPS code: 13-36024
- GNIS feature ID: 0331893

Hagan is a city in Evans County, Georgia, United States. The population was 959 in 2020.

== History ==
The Georgia General Assembly incorporated the place as the City of Hagan in 1906. The community was named after Susan Hagan, the wife of the original owner of the town site.

== Geography ==
Hagan is located at 32°9′19″N 81°55′55″W (32.155286, -81.931872).

According to the United States Census Bureau, the city has a total area of 2.2 square miles (5.7 km^{2}), of which 2.1 square miles (5.4 km^{2}) is land and 0.1 square miles (0.26 km^{2}) (4.59%) is water.

=== Climate ===
Hagan has a humid subtropical climate according to the Köppen classification. The city has hot and humid summers with average highs of 94 degrees and lows of 70 degrees in July. Winters are mild with average January highs of 61 degrees and lows of 36 degrees. Winter storms are rare, but they can happen on occasion.

Climate data for Hagan, Georgia
Month	Jan	Feb	Mar	Apr	May	Jun	Jul	Aug	Sep	Oct	Nov	Dec	Year
Record high °F (°C)	81 (27)	86 (30)	89 (32)	96 (36)	98 (37)	106 (41)	107 (42)	105 (41)	104 (40)	96 (36)	87 (31)	84 (29)	107 (42)
Mean daily maximum °F (°C)	61 (16)	66 (19)	73 (23)	78 (26)	86 (30)	91 (33)	94 (34)	92 (33)	87 (31)	80 (27)	71 (22)	63 (17)	79 (26)
Mean daily minimum °F (°C)	36 (2)	39 (4)	44 (7)	50 (10)	59 (15)	67 (19)	71 (22)	70 (21)	65 (18)	54 (12)	45 (7)	38 (3)	53 (12)
Record low °F (°C)	−2 (−19)	13 (−11)	16 (−9)	28 (−2)	41 (5)	48 (9)	58 (14)	56 (13)	45 (7)	30 (−1)	22 (−6)	13 (−11)	−2 (−19)
Average precipitation inches (mm)	4.36 (111)	3.57 (91)	3.25 (83)	2.95 (75)	3.21 (82)	5.12 (130)	4.68 (119)	5.41 (137)	3.73 (95)	3.87 (98)	2.49 (63)	3.17 (81)	45.81 (1,165)
Source: The Weather Channel

== Demographics ==
Historical population
Census	Pop.	Note	%±
1910	784		—
1920	356		−54.6%
1930	431		21.1%
1940	685		58.9%
1950	525		−23.4%
1960	552		5.1%
1970	572		3.6%
1980	880		53.8%
1990	787		−10.6%
2000	898		14.1%
2010	996		10.9%
2020	959		−3.7%
U.S. Decennial Census

As of the census of 2000, there were 898 people, 362 households, and 229 families residing in the city. By the 2020 census, its population was 959.
