= The Claxton Bakery =

American confectionery company

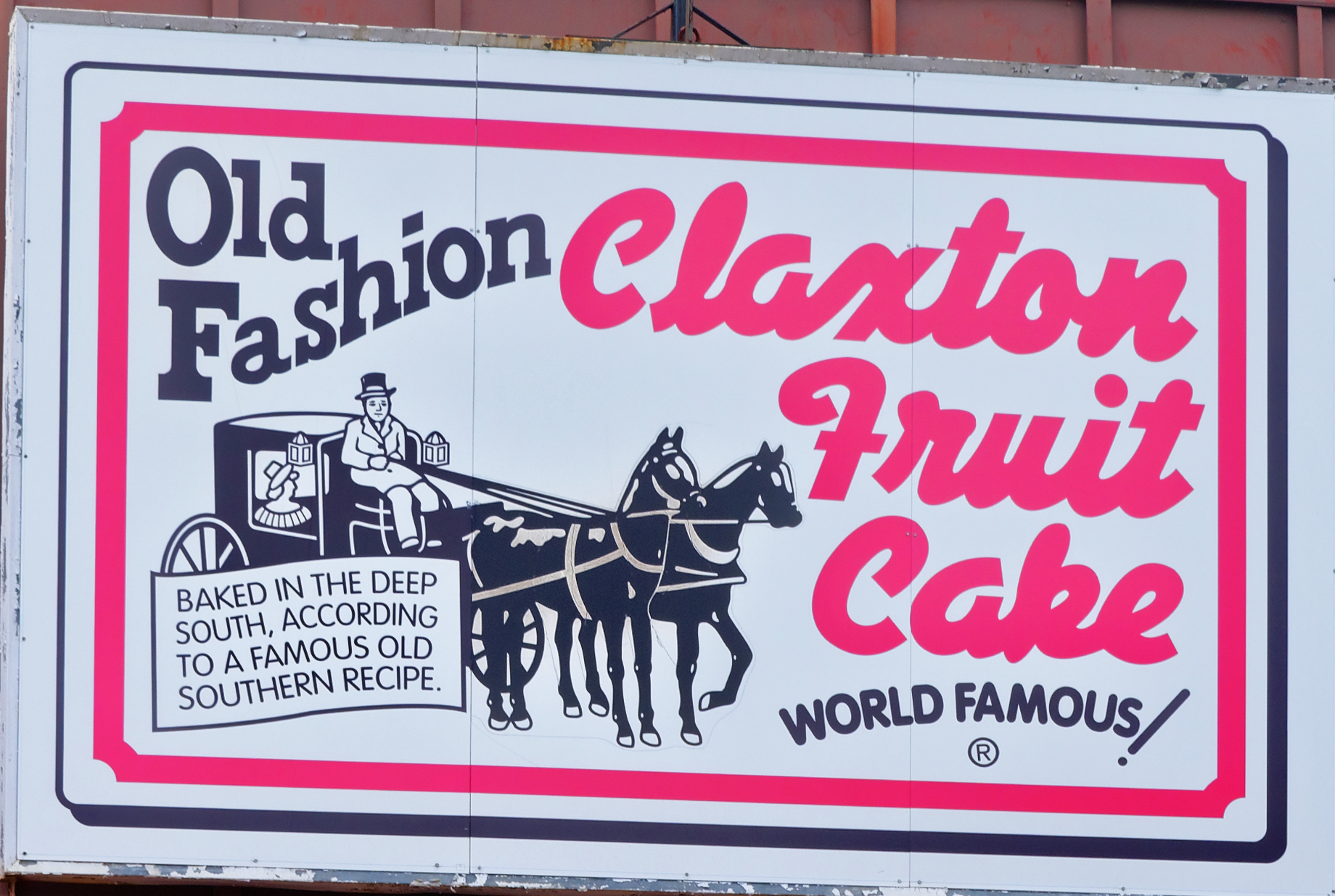
- Company type: Private
- Industry: confectionery
- Founder: Savino Gillio-Tos
- Headquarters: Claxton, Georgia, United States
- Products: fruitcakes
- Website: www.claxtonfruitcake.com

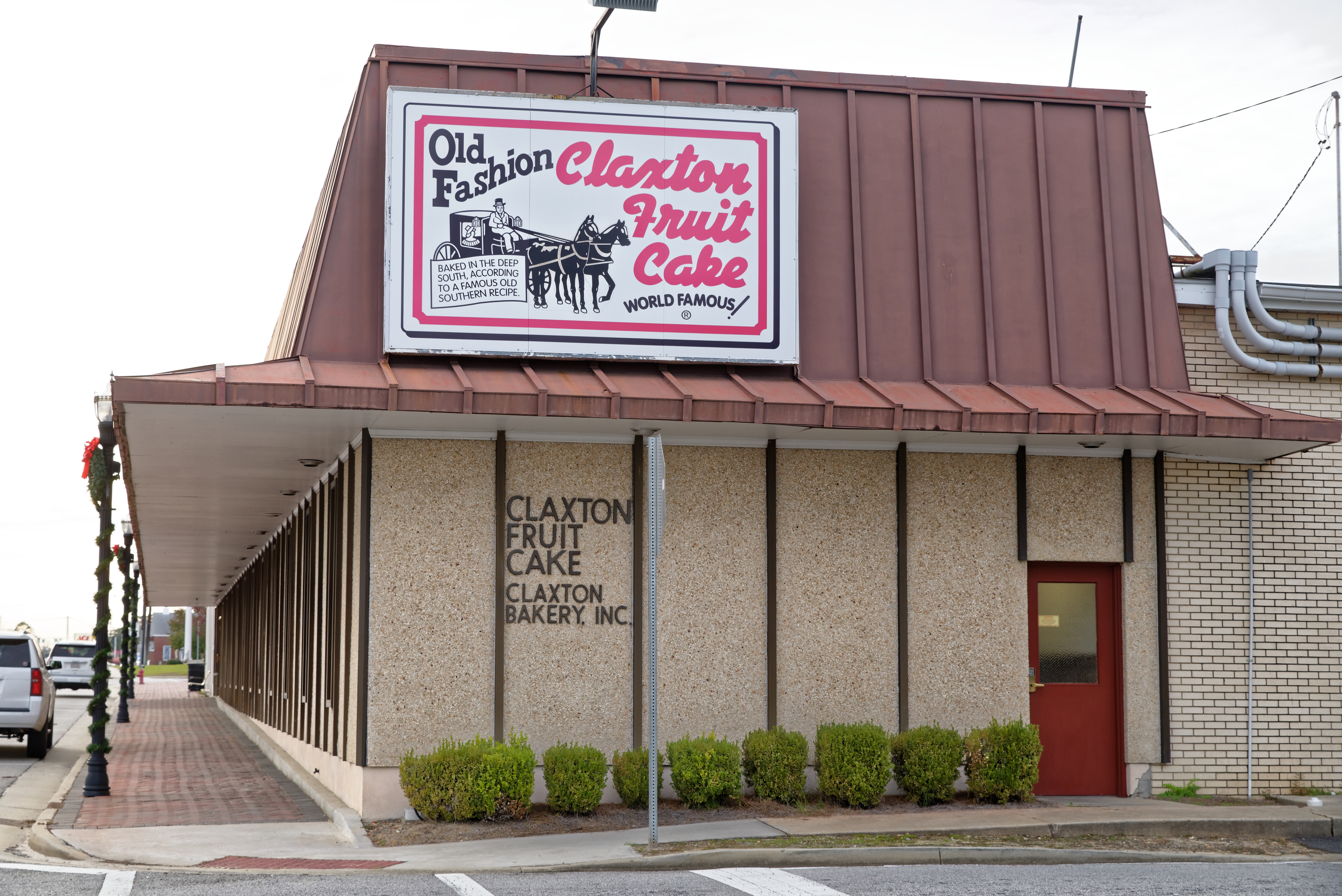
Claxton Fruit Cake

The Claxton Bakery is a confectionery company based in Claxton, Georgia.

== History ==
The Claxton Bakery was founded by Savino Gillio-Tos (March 31, 1885 in Ivrea, Italy - January 1966 in Claxton, Georgia) who immigrated to the United States in 1902. He moved to New York City, where he worked at a Brooklyn hotel as a master baker. He eventually took a job in Macon, Georgia and moved from there to Claxton. Mr. Gillio-Tos's Claxton Bakery was a successful maker of baked goods, homemade ice cream and fruitcakes. In 1945, Savino Gillio-Tos sold the bakery to Albert Parker, an employee, and retired.

=== Albert Parker's Claxton Bakery ===
Under Parker's leadership, the Claxton Bakery began to focus on fruitcakes; this eventually led the bakery to start selling fruitcakes for fundraising purposes in the 1950s. One of the bakery's earliest fundraising partners was Civitan International; since 1951, local Civitans have sold millions of pounds of Claxton fruitcake each holiday season in support of their work with the developmentally disabled. A little over a decade later, in 1964 and 1965, the company was part of the New York World's Fair. Mr. Parker quickly took advantage of the success at the fair and came up with other means to get his product out to the world. One such innovation came when he entered several floats in the Orange Bowl Jamboree Parade in Miami and also the Cherry Blossom Festival Parade in Washington, D.C. Today the Claxton Bakery, Inc. works with over a thousand organizations throughout North America.

On May 21, 1995, Albert Parker died. His three sons and his daughter now run the corporation.
