= Claxton, Georgia =

- City
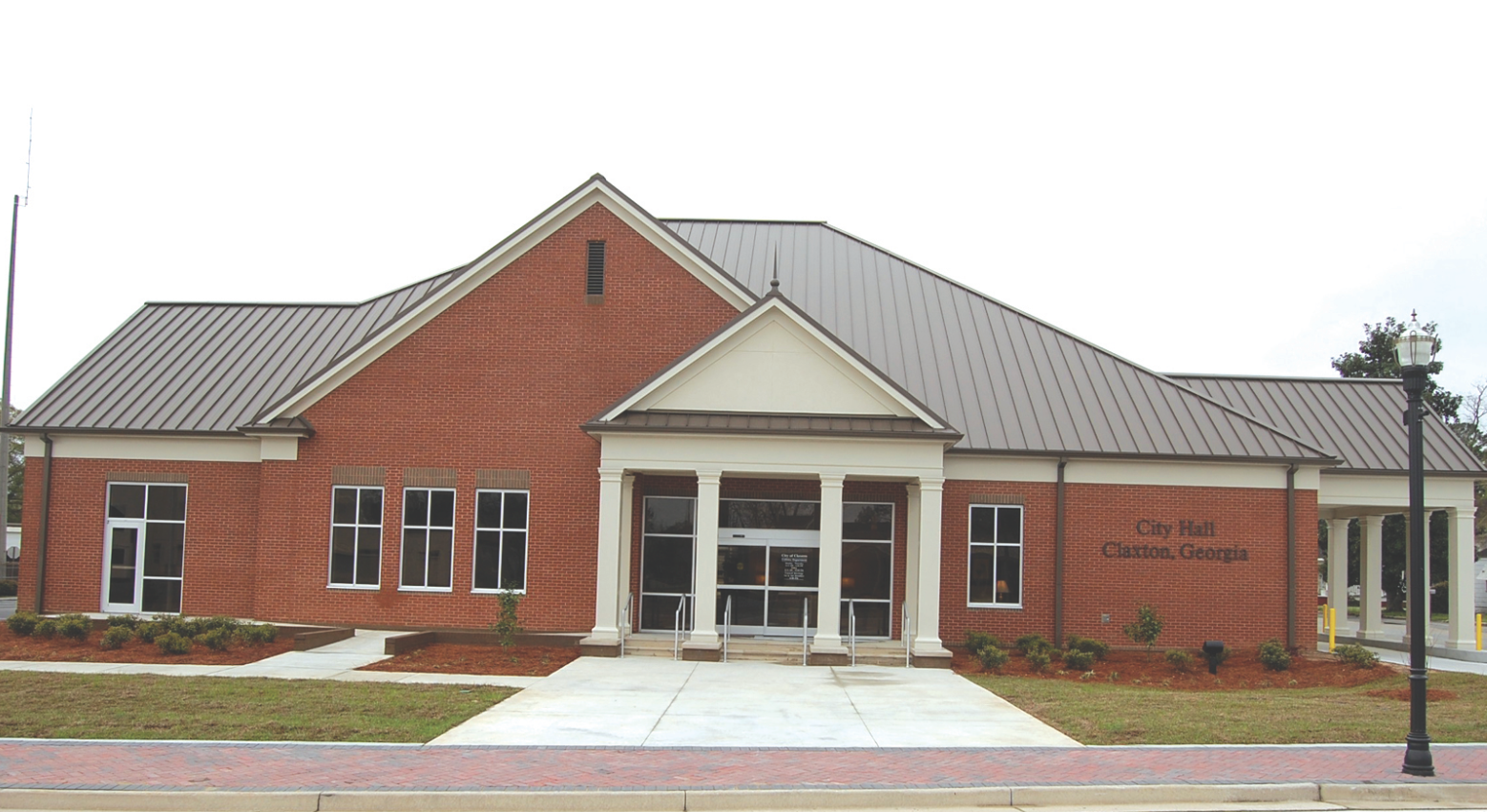
- The city hall in Claxton
- Nickname: "The Fruitcake Capital of the World"
- Location in Evans County and the state of Georgia
- Coordinates: 32°9′39″N 81°54′31″W
- Country: United States
- State: Georgia
- County: Evans
- Founded: May 1890
- Incorporated: April 1894

Government
  - Mayor: Terry Branch
  - City Clerk: Gayle Durrence
  - City Administrator: Gayle Durrence

Area
  - Total: 1.75 sq mi (4.54 km^{2})
  - Land: 1.74 sq mi (4.50 km^{2})
  - Water: 0.015 sq mi (0.04 km^{2})
- Elevation: 184 ft (56 m)

Population (2020)
  - Total: 2,602
  - Density: 1,497/sq mi (577.9/km^{2})
- Time zone: UTC-5 (EST)
  - Summer (DST): UTC-4 (EDT)
- ZIP codes: 30414, 30417
- Area code: 912
- FIPS code: 13-16600
- GNIS feature ID: 0312697
- Website: cityofclaxton.net

Claxton is a city in Evans County, Georgia, United States. The population was 2,602 in 2020. It is the county seat of Evans County.

== History ==
The town had its visionary, W.R. Hendricks. In May 1890 there were only a couple of dwellings scattered around the area that is Claxton. Hendricks, son of Glenn and Nancy Hendricks, had been given a large tract of land by his parents. The Hendricks's ambition was to secure a railroad station at the site, but they met considerable opposition from railroad company officials who maintained that existing stations in the area were sufficient to meet the needs. W.R. Hendricks made a proposition to railroad officials that a well be dug and pump installed free of charge so that trains could stop for water. The deal was made and actual construction began in the latter part of June 1890. The vision of building a town was fully supported by Hendricks's mother, who offered to give a lot to anyone who would erect a building upon it. A number of people accepted her offer, so she revised the plan and proposed to sell one lot and give an adjoining parcel to ones who desired to build.

With the establishment of a town well underway, efforts were begun to establish a post office at the settlement already widely known as "Hendricks". Postal officials in Washington, D.C., upon receiving an application from George E. Wood, declined to approve the name, because a post office in the state was already operating under that name in Upson County. Two other names were then submitted, "Jenny" and "Claxton". Postal officials agreed to Claxton, and the post office opened in 1890.

There is some dispute about the origin of the name. Some local historians contend that the name of a popular actress, Kate Claxton, was the source, while others believe it was in honor of Philander Priestly Claxton, a noted educator of the time.

Shortly after the Claxton post office opened, D.C. Newton, one of the partners in a naval stores company, laid out on a sheet of brown wrapping paper what became the original map of Claxton. Newton drew in the streets, laid out lots and later added street names. The whereabouts of the original map is not known; however, it is believed that this first map remained in his possession until his death and was passed down to his son who died in the 1990s. Another map, believed to be similar to the original, was in the possession of R.R. "Bobby" Tippins, president of Tippins Bank and Trust Company and descendant of the family who founded the bank in Claxton; he died in the 2000s.

== Geography ==
Claxton is located at the center of Evans County at 32°9′39″N 81°54′31″W (32.160932, -81.908674). It is bordered to the west by the city of Hagan. U.S. Routes 280 and 301 intersect in the center of town; US 280 leads east 52 miles (84 km) to Savannah and west 36 miles (58 km) to Vidalia, while US 301 leads north 22 miles (35 km) to Statesboro and south 48 miles (77 km) to Jesup.

According to the United States Census Bureau, Claxton has a total area of 1.7 square miles (4.5 km^{2}), of which 0.02 square miles (0.04 km^{2}), or 0.84%, is water. The city is in the coastal plain region of Georgia. Several types of tree, including pine, oak, sycamore, chinaberry, live oak, sweetgum, and poplar are prevalent in the area.

=== Climate ===
Claxton has a humid subtropical climate according to the Köppen classification. It has hot and humid summers with average highs of 94 and lows of 70 in July. Winters are mild with average January highs of 61 and lows of 36. Winter storms are occasional.

Climate data for Claxton, Georgia
Month	Jan	Feb	Mar	Apr	May	Jun	Jul	Aug	Sep	Oct	Nov	Dec	Year
Record high °F (°C)	81 (27)	86 (30)	89 (32)	96 (36)	98 (37)	106 (41)	107 (42)	105 (41)	104 (40)	96 (36)	87 (31)	84 (29)	107 (42)
Mean daily maximum °F (°C)	61 (16)	66 (19)	73 (23)	78 (26)	86 (30)	91 (33)	94 (34)	92 (33)	87 (31)	80 (27)	71 (22)	63 (17)	79 (26)
Mean daily minimum °F (°C)	36 (2)	39 (4)	44 (7)	50 (10)	59 (15)	67 (19)	71 (22)	70 (21)	65 (18)	54 (12)	45 (7)	38 (3)	53 (12)
Record low °F (°C)	−2 (−19)	13 (−11)	16 (−9)	28 (−2)	41 (5)	48 (9)	58 (14)	56 (13)	45 (7)	30 (−1)	22 (−6)	13 (−11)	−2 (−19)
Average precipitation inches (mm)	4.36 (111)	3.57 (91)	3.25 (83)	2.95 (75)	3.21 (82)	5.12 (130)	4.68 (119)	5.41 (137)	3.73 (95)	3.87 (98)	2.49 (63)	3.17 (81)	45.81 (1,165)
Source: The Weather Channel

== Demographics ==
Historical population
Census	Pop.	Note	%±
1900	553		—
1910	1,008		82.3%
1920	1,265		25.5%
1930	1,584		25.2%
1940	1,808		14.1%
1950	1,923		6.4%
1960	2,672		38.9%
1970	2,669		−0.1%
1980	2,694		0.9%
1990	2,464		−8.5%
2000	2,276		−7.6%
2010	2,393		5.1%
2020	2,602		8.7%
U.S. Decennial Census

=== 2020 census ===
As of the 2020 census, there were 2,602 people, 908 households, and 660 families residing in the city. The median age was 35.9 years. 28.2% of residents were under the age of 18 and 17.9% were 65 years of age or older. For every 100 females, there were 84.5 males, and for every 100 females age 18 and over, there were 74.2 males age 18 and over.

There were 1,054 households in Claxton, of which 32.0% had children under the age of 18 living in them. Of all households, 28.3% were married-couple households, 19.4% were households with a male householder and no spouse or partner present, and 47.9% were households with a female householder and no spouse or partner present. About 39.2% of all households were made up of individuals, and 20.2% had someone living alone who was 65 years of age or older.

There were 1,188 housing units, of which 11.3% were vacant. The homeowner vacancy rate was 3.0%, and the rental vacancy rate was 5.8%.

0.0% of residents lived in urban areas, while 100.0% lived in rural areas.

Claxton racial composition as of 2020
Race	Num.	Perc.
White (non-Hispanic)	989	38.01%
Black or African American (non-Hispanic)	1,124	43.2%
Asian	24	0.92%
Pacific Islander	1	0.04%
Other/Mixed	76	2.92%
Hispanic or Latino	388	14.91%

== Government ==
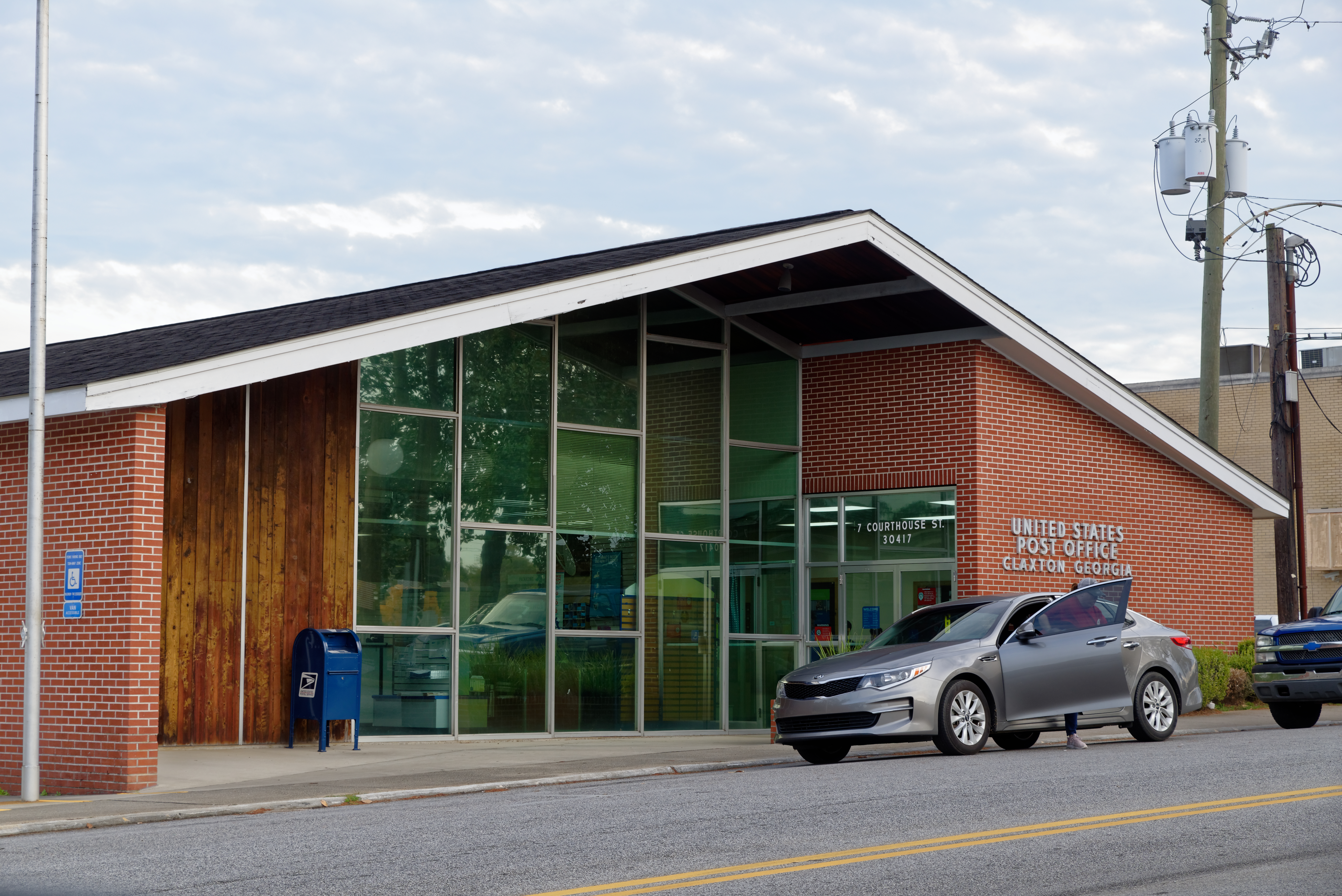
Claxton Post Office

Claxton is governed by a mayor and city council. The mayor is elected at large, while the seven member council is elected by district. Other officials in the city include the city manager, city attorney, police chief, street superintendent, public works director, personnel director, finance officer, purchasing agent, code enforcer, fire chief, municipal court judge, municipal court clerk, zoning administrator, gas superintendent, and water superintendent.

== Education ==
Public education in Claxton is supervised by the Evans County School District. The current superintendent is Dr. Marty Waters.

All schools have been fully accredited by the Southern Association of Colleges and Schools as well as the Georgia Accrediting Commission. The public schools in Claxton are Claxton Elementary School, Claxton Middle School, and Claxton High School.

Pinewood Christian Academy was founded in Bellville, Georgia, in 1970. It serves Pre-K4 through 12th grade.

== Claxton Fruit Cake ==
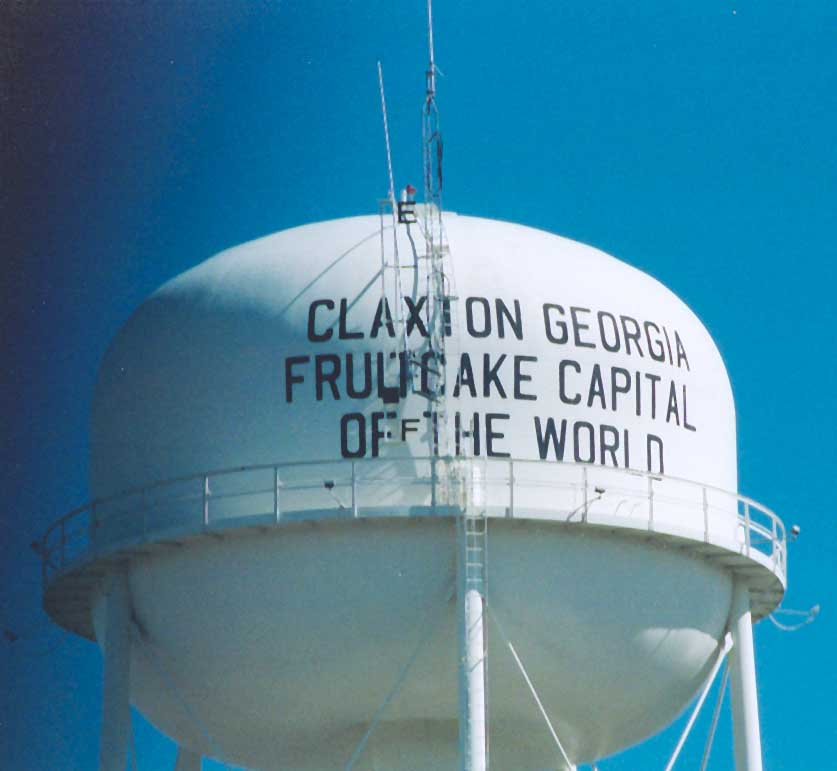
The water tower for Claxton, Georgia, celebrating its fruitcake manufacture.

The city is known as the home of the Claxton Fruit Cake which is exported from the Claxton Bakery and the Georgia Fruitcake Company. (See fruitcake.)

== Media ==
Claxton and Evans County are well served by locally owned and operated radio and newspaper. WCLA Radio broadcasts on 93.7 FM and on 1470 AM. WCLA was known for years as the "World's Only Drive-In Radio Station" as it was based in the large screen of Claxton's Tos Drive-In Theatre. Claxton Enterprise has been published since 1912, before the creation of Evans County. Local cable television service is provided by Comcast Xfinity. WLFH-FM (88.9) and WMCD-FM (107.3), while legally licensed to Claxton by the Federal Communications Commission, have offices or studios outside Evans County: WLFH-FM is based in Savannah and WMCD-FM in Statesboro.

== Claxton meteorite ==
On December 10, 1984, a meteorite fell in Claxton and hit a mailbox. The mailbox sold for $83,000 because it is said to be the only mailbox a meteorite has struck. The meteorite was classified as an L6.

== Notable people ==
- Curtis G. Hames, heart specialist known for discovering cause of heart attacks in soil of coastal Georgia
- Joe Odom, musician, featured in Midnight in the Garden of Good and Evil
