= WRBX =

Coordinates: 32.087°N 82.130°W

- Reidsville, Georgia; United States
- Frequency: 104.1 MHz

Ownership
- Owner: William Keith Register
- Sister stations: WTNL

History
- First air date: 1973

Technical information
- Licensing authority: FCC
- Class: A
- ERP: 4,900 watts
- HAAT: 110 meters

Links
- Public license information: Public file; LMS
- Website: wrbx.org

WRBX is a 4900 watt station covering parts of south Georgia. The format is Southern Gospel with a mix of blueglass gospel, classic songs and current top 80 hits.

WRBX is also the voice of Tattnall County High School Warrior Sports.
