= Tattnall County School District =

School district in Georgia (U.S. state)

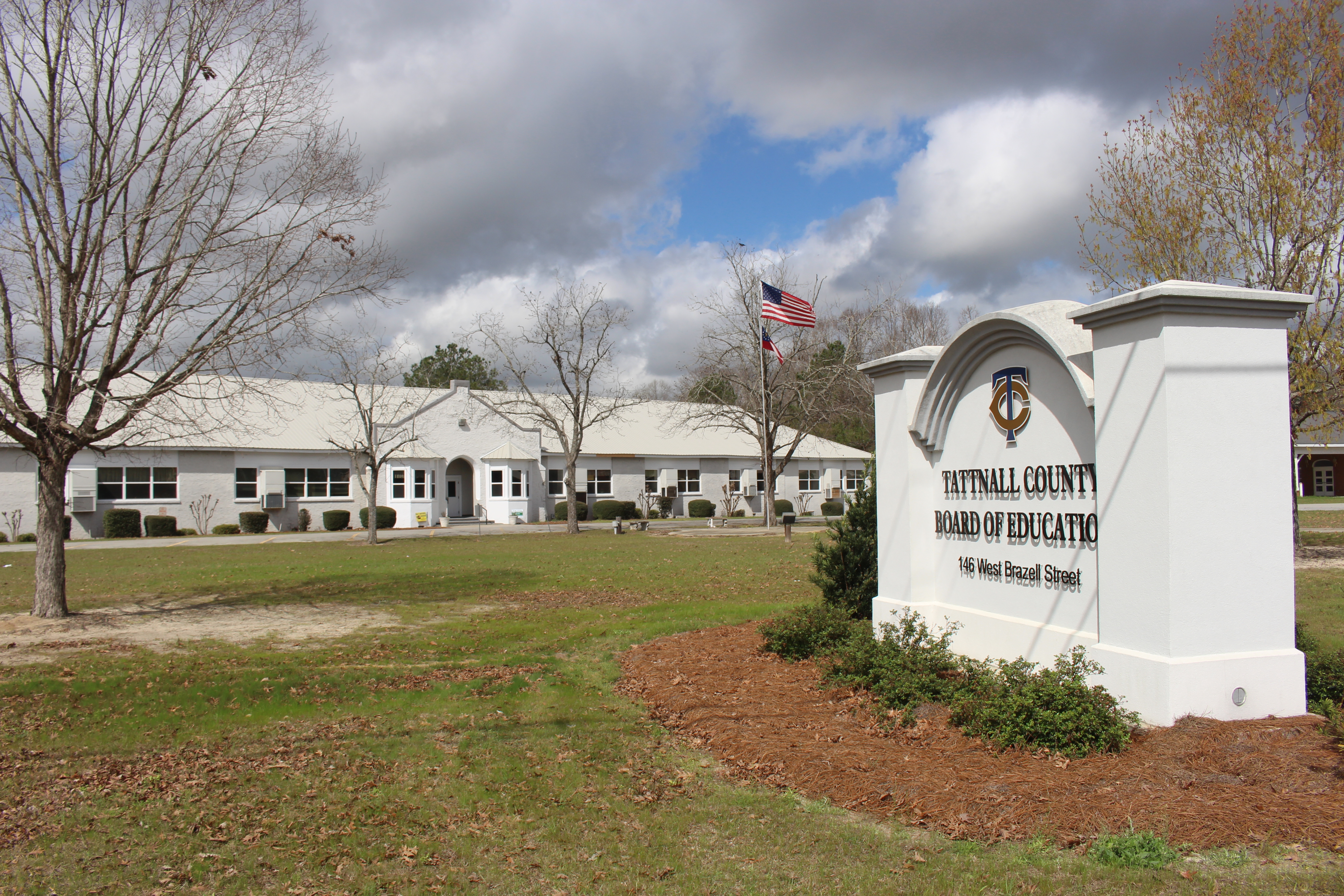
- District headquarters

Address
- 146 East Brazell Street Reidsville, Georgia, 30453; United States
- Coordinates: 32.088543°N 82.115845°W

District information
- Grades: Pre-school - 12
- Superintendent: Gina Williams
- Accreditations: Southern Association of Colleges and Schools; Georgia Accrediting Commission

Students and staff
- Enrollment: 3,305
- Faculty: 201

Other information
- Website: tattnallschools.org

The Tattnall County School District is a public school district in Tattnall County, Georgia, United States, based in Reidsville. It serves the communities of Cobbtown, Collins, Glennville, Manassas, and Reidsville.

It serves as the designated K-12 school district for the county, except parts in Fort Stewart. Fort Stewart has the Department of Defense Education Activity (DoDEA) as its local school district, for the elementary level. Students at the secondary level on Fort Stewart attend public schools operated by county school districts.

== Schools ==
The Tattnall County School District has three elementary schools, two middle schools, and one high school.

=== Elementary schools ===
- South Tattnall Elementary School
- North Tattnall Elementary School

=== Middle school ===
- South Tattnall Middle School
- North Tattnall Middle School

=== High school ===
- Tattnall County High School

=== Former schools ===
- Collins Elementary School
- Glennville Elementary School
- Reidsville Elementary School

== Gallery ==
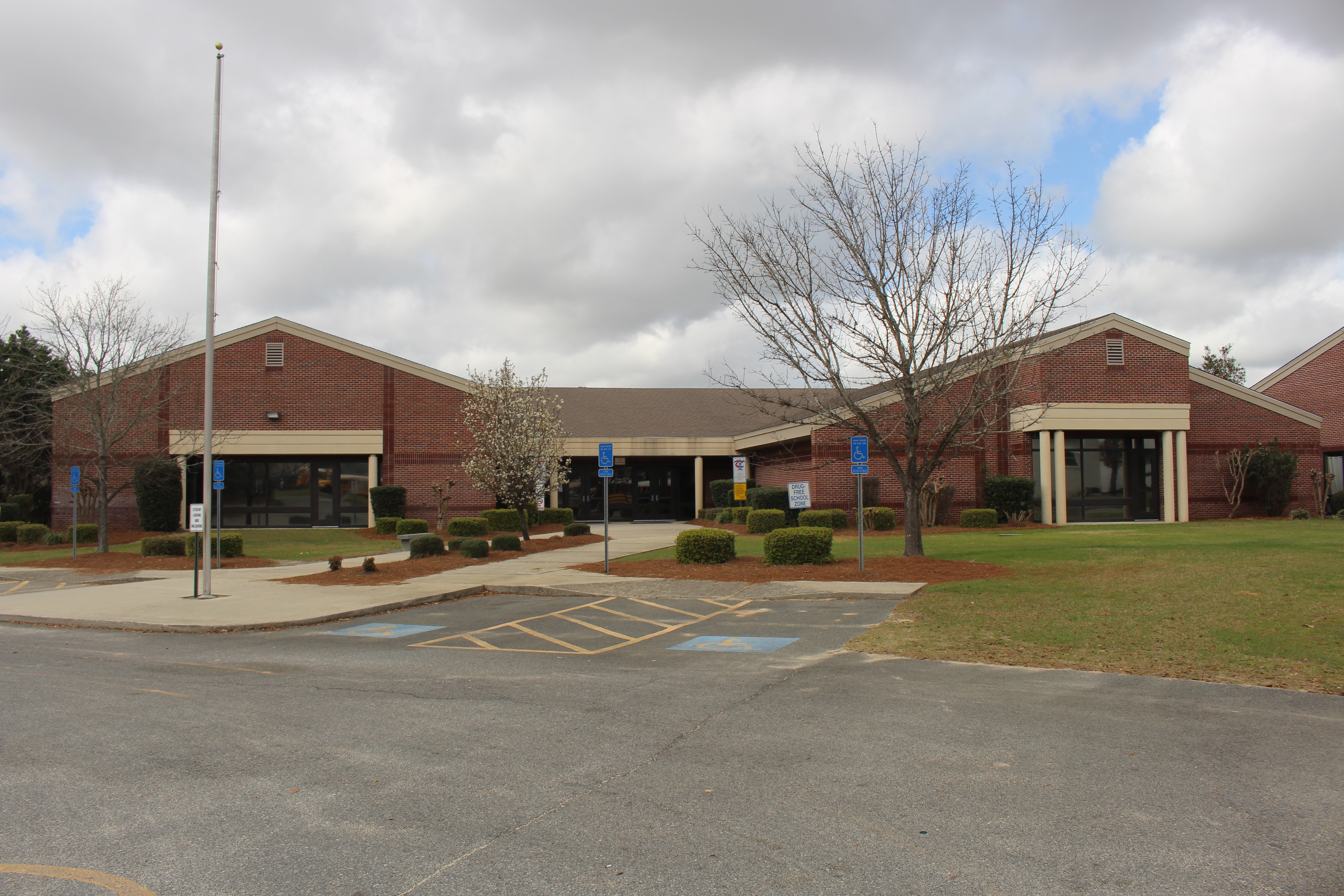
Reidsville Middle School

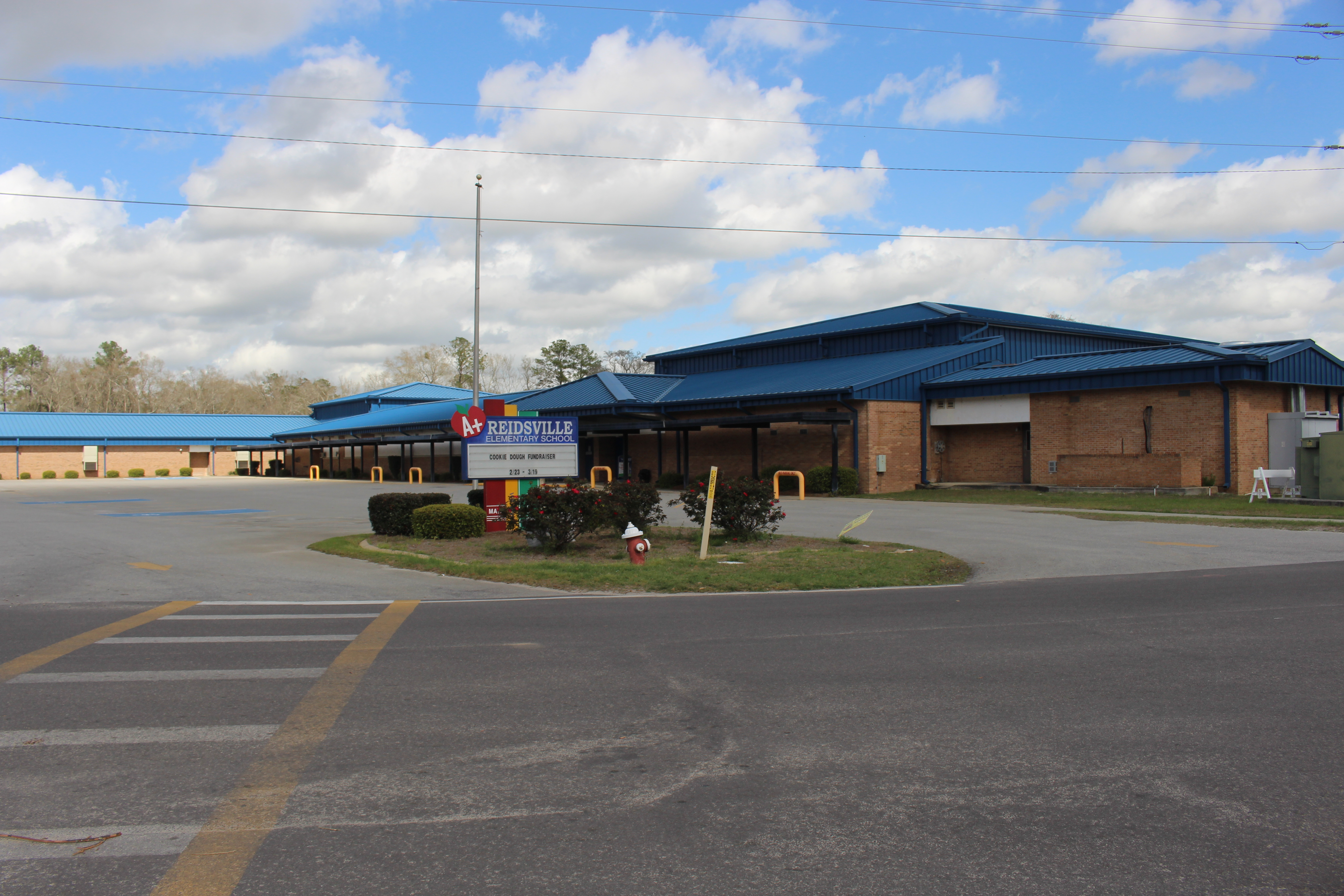
Reidsville Elementary School
