= Jack Hill State Park =

State park in Reidsville, Georgia, USA

- Location within Georgia
- Location: Tattnall County, Georgia
- Nearest city: Reidsville, Georgia
- Coordinates: 32°5′31.51″N 82°8′9.61″W
- Area: 662 acres (270 ha)

Jack Hill State Park, formerly named Gordonia-Alatamaha State Park, is a 662-acre (268 ha) Georgia state park located in Reidsville, a city on Georgia's coastal plain region. The park is known for having a dramatic history, having been previously under water for nearly 20 million years. Until about 1 million years ago, the area was very similar to the dense jungles and plains of Africa. The park was named for the nearby Altamaha River and the park's nearly extinct Gordonia Tree. The park contains a 12-acre (4.9 ha) lake stocked with fish, as well as a 9-hole golf course, named Brazell's Creek, which has recently been upgraded to 18 holes.

In 2020, the park was renamed from Gordonia-Alatamaha to Jack Hill, honoring the late Georgia senator who did much for the community. Hill was instrumental in bringing many facilities to the park, including its group shelter, cabins, splash pad, expanded golf course and more.

== Facilities ==
- 26 Tent/Trailer/RV Sites
- 8 Cottages

1 Walk-In Campsite

- 18-Hole Golf Course
- Water Pad
- 4 Picnic Shelters
- 1 Group Shelter
- Miniature Golf Course
- Pedal Boat, Aquacycle and Paddleboard Rental
- Fishing Boat Rental

== Annual events ==
- Golf Tournament (April)
