= Emma Gresham =

American teacher and politician

Personal details
- Born: Emma Rene Rhodes; April 13, 1925 Reidsville, Georgia, U.S.
- Died: March 2, 2018 (aged 92)
- Spouse: Quinten Gresham Sr. (m. 1942)
- Children: 5
- Education: Boggs Academy; Paine College
- Occupation: Politician, teacher

Emma Rene Gresham (née Rhodes; April 13, 1925 – March 2, 2018) was an American teacher and politician, who was mayor of Keysville, Georgia.

== Early life and education ==
Emma Rene Rhodes was born in Reidsville, Georgia, to Herman and Ida Clark Rhodes. She graduated from Boggs Academy at the age of 15 as the salutatorian of her class.

She was a 1953 honor graduate of Paine College. In 1942, she married Quinten Gresham Sr., with whom she had five children.

== Career ==
She taught mainly elementary-age special education students in Talladega, Alabama, and Augusta, Georgia, for over 32 years. In 1985, on finding out about the inactive charter and government of her hometown of Keysville, Georgia, which had not been functioning since 1933, she ran for mayor. Gresham ran, only to have the position stripped from her after five hours by a Superior Court judge in Augusta who revoked the city's charter, upholding a challenge by a group of residents who disputed the town's boundaries.

After national news coverage in 1989 and due to a tape-recorded oral history from the town's oldest resident, 93-year-old Henry Key, the city was able to determine boundary lines. In 1989, a federal court upheld the elections, and on June 4, 1990, the Supreme Court affirmed the lower court's ruling. Gresham remained mayor of Keysville until 2005. During her tenure of 20 years, Gresham helped Keysville to have a fully functioning water and sewer service; street lights; fire department; library; post office; wastewater treatment plant; after-school program and municipal building.

Gresham was the second African American woman to be a chief elected official in Georgia. She was active at her church, Mt. Tabor African Methodist Episcopal Church, where she was a lifelong member and 3rd Generation A.M.E. Church Leader. Among her hundreds of awards, she has received an Essence Award, One Hundred Eckerd Women and was named a SCLC Drum Major for Justice.
