= WTNL =

- Reidsville, Georgia; United States
- Frequency: 1390 kHz

Programming
- Format: Southern Gospel

Ownership
- Owner: William Keith Register
- Sister stations: WRBX

Technical information
- Licensing authority: FCC
- Facility ID: 73931
- Class: D
- Power: 280 watts day 35 watts night
- Transmitter coordinates: 32°5′14.00″N 82°7′47.00″W

Links
- Public license information: Public file; LMS

WTNL (1390 AM) was a Christian radio station broadcasting a Southern Gospel format. It was licensed to Reidsville, Georgia, United States, and was owned by William Keith Register.

The Federal Communications Commission cancelled the station's license on November 20, 2026.
