= Alexander Hotel =

Alexander Hotel may refer to:

- Alexandria Hotel and Annex, Napa, California, listed on the National Register of Historic Places (NRHP)
- Alexander Hotel (St. Petersburg, Florida), NRHP-listed
- Alexander Hotel (Reidsville, Georgia), NRHP-listed
