= Smith-Nelson Hotel =

Historic hotel in the US state of Georgia

- U.S. National Register of Historic Places
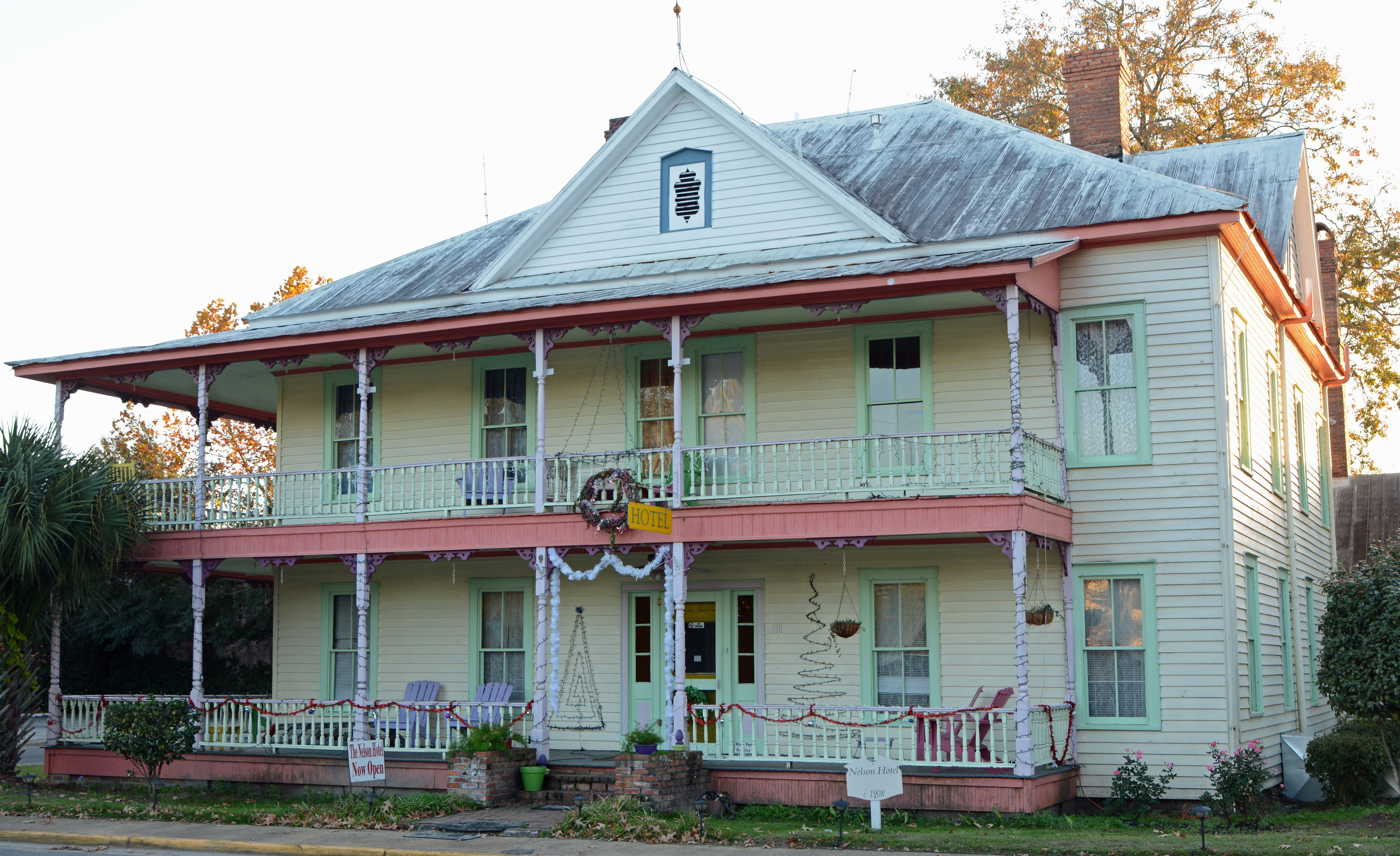
- Smith-Nelson Hotel in 2015

- Location within Georgia Location within the United States
- Location: 118 S. Main St., Reidsville, Georgia
- Coordinates: 32.08578°N 82.11663°W
- Area: 0.3 acres (0.12 ha)
- Architectural style: Folk Victorian
- NRHP reference No.: 01000305
- Added to NRHP: March 29, 2001

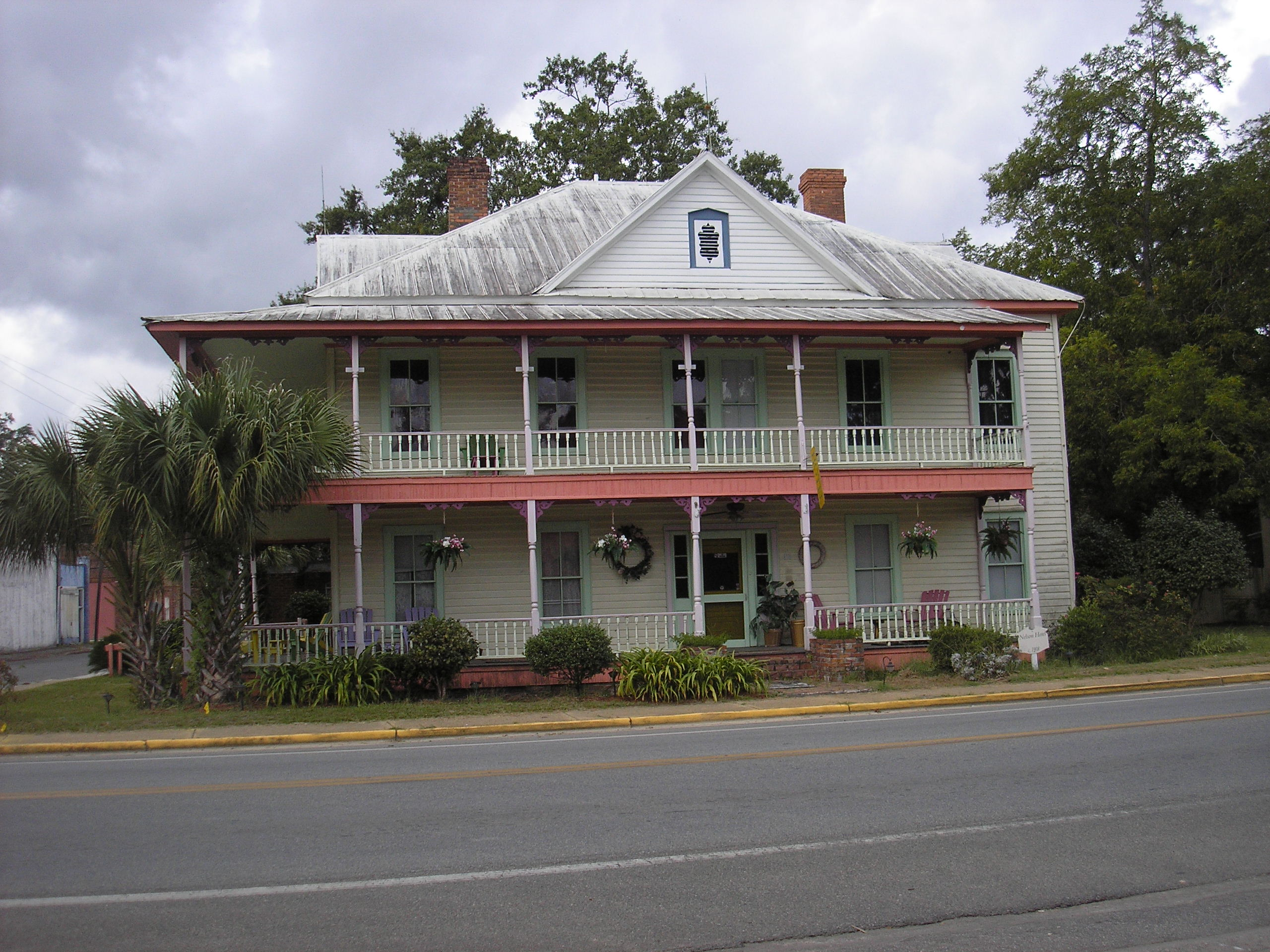

Smith-Nelson Hotel, and also known as the Nelson Hotel and to locals as The Painted Lady, is a historic hotel in Reidsville, Georgia, in Tattnall County. The address of the hotel is 118 South Main Street. It is a two-story building built in 1908 and is considered Folk Victorian in architectural style. It has a hipped roof with center gables and a wrap-around porch. Tongue-and-groove paneling is used throughout the inside. Each floor has a central hallway with two rooms on each side. A one-story kitchen ell was added in the 1950s. As of February 2018, the building is for sale.

It was added to the National Register of Historic Places on March 29, 2001.

== See also ==
- National Register of Historic Places listings in Tattnall County, Georgia
