= Rogers State Prison =

Prison in Georgia, United States

Coordinates: 32°00′19″N 82°09′47″W

- Interactive map of Rogers State Prison
- Location: 1978 Georgia Highway 147 Reidsville, Georgia postal address
- Status: open
- Security class: medium
- Capacity: 1450
- Opened: 1983; expanded 1989
- Managed by: Georgia Department of Corrections

Rogers State Prison is a Georgia Department of Corrections state medium-security prison for men located in unincorporated Tattnall County, Georgia, near Reidsville. Currently, the operational capacity of the facility is 1450 inmates and its warden is Sandi West. (Reidsville is also the site of the 1938 Georgia State Prison, about one mile away.)

The facility includes an extensive working farm, a canning operation, a dairy, and beef and pork production. These agricultural programs contribute a significant amount of food back into other state prisons.

In May 2005 multiple correctional officers were suspended, pending an investigation of allegations made by a former guard and whistleblower named Tommy Cardell. Cardell went to the Georgia Bureau of Investigation claiming that he had seen 20 to 30 instances of prisoners being beaten while handcuffed, and other systematic cruel treatment.

Rogers was the scene of the alleged mistreatment of a transgender female inmate named Zahara Green in July 2012. Green filed suit against the state corrections department.

On October 25, 2019 the administration at Rogers State Prison released, due to an error, prisoner Tony Maycon Munoz-Mendez, 31, who was convicted of rape and aggravated child molestation in Gwinnett County, according to Georgia Department of Corrections records. He had been in prison since April 2015 and was serving a life sentence. Officials with the U.S. Marshals Service and the Georgia Department of Corrections recaptured Munoz-Mendez on October 30, 2019 in Kentucky.
