= National Register of Historic Places listings in Tattnall County, Georgia =

This is a list of properties and districts in Tattnall County, Georgia that are listed on the National Register of Historic Places (NRHP).

This National Park Service list is complete through NPS recent listings posted March 21, 2025.

== Current listings ==
	Name on the Register	Image	Date listed	Location	City or town	Description
1	Alexander Hotel	Alexander Hotel	June 17, 1982 (#82002481)	204 W. Brazell St. 32°05′09″N 82°07′10″W	Reidsville	Built in 1892
2	Glennwanis Hotel	Glennwanis Hotel	April 11, 2003 (#03000199)	209-215 E. Barnard St. 31°56′08″N 81°55′33″W	Glennville	Built in 1926
3	Smith-Nelson Hotel	Smith-Nelson Hotel	March 29, 2001 (#01000305)	118 S. Main St. 32°05′09″N 82°07′00″W	Reidsville	Built in 1908
