= H. Ross Ake =

American politician (1878–1954)

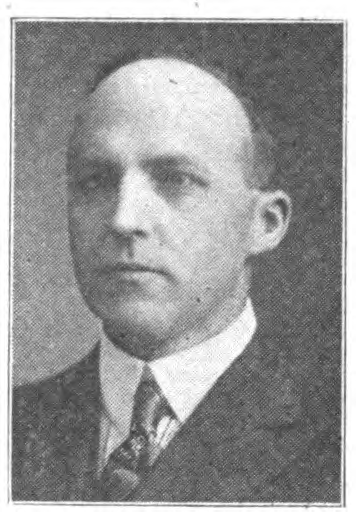
- Ake, c. 1920

Ohio State Treasurer
- In office February 1929 – November 1930
- Appointed by: Myers Y. Cooper
- Preceded by: Bert B. Buckley
- Succeeded by: Edwin A. Todd

Member of the Ohio Senate from the 21st district
- In office January 6, 1919 – January 2, 1921
- Preceded by: Adam W. Oberlin

Personal details
- Born: September 22, 1878 Osnaburg Township, Stark County, Ohio, U.S.
- Died: February 11, 1954 (aged 75) East Canton, Ohio, U.S.
- Resting place: Mapleton Cemetery; Mapleton, Ohio, U.S. 40°44′54″N 81°14′27″W
- Party: Republican
- Spouse: Hannah Roxanne Dager (m. 1904)
- Children: 3
- Education: Mount Union College

Howard Ross Ake (September 22, 1878 – February 11, 1954) was a Republican politician and banker from the U.S. state of Ohio. He was elected to the Ohio State Senate, appointed as Ohio State Treasurer, and ran unsuccessfully for Congress.

== Biography ==
H. Ross Ake was born September 22, 1878, on a farm in Osnaburg Township, Stark County, Ohio. His parents, John Ake, and Cora Shearer Ake were both born in Stark County. He attended the country schools and Mount Union College. He was a banker in Canton, Ohio, and was secretary-treasurer and manager of the Canton, Ohio, Morris Plan Bank from its founding in 1916. He also was on the Board of Governors of the National Association of Morris Plan Bankers.

Ake served two terms as County Treasurer of Stark County, before being elected to the Ohio State Senate in 1918. He served during 1919 and 1920. This was during the period of anti-German sentiment by the war with Germany in World War I. The legislature passed the Ake Law, which in 1919 outlawed the teaching of the German language below the eighth grade in all schools, both public and private. The United States Supreme Court, in Meyer v. Nebraska (1923), determined the law and ones like it to be unconstitutional, as the state did not have the authority to ban German in private schools. Ake also was favorable toward labor in the legislature.

In February 1929, Ohio State Treasurer Bert B. Buckley was convicted of bribery, and forced to resign rather than be impeached. His two-year term had just started, and would not expire until January 1931. Ohio Governor Myers Y. Cooper appointed Ake to finish the term. He resigned in November, 1930.

H. Ross Ake was the Republican nominee for Ohio's 16th congressional district in 1936. He ran as an isolationist, and lost to incumbent Democrat William R. Thom.

Ake was married to Hannah Roxaine Dager in 1904. They had three children. Ake was a member of the Masons, the Knights of Pythias, the Loyal Order of Moose, and the Jr. O.U.A.M.

H. Ross Ake died February 11, 1954, in East Canton, Ohio.

Political offices
| Preceded by Bert B. Buckley | Treasurer of Ohio; 1929–1930 | Succeeded by Edwin A. Todd |
