= Alexander Hotel (Reidsville, Georgia) =

Historic hotel in Georgia, US

- U.S. National Register of Historic Places
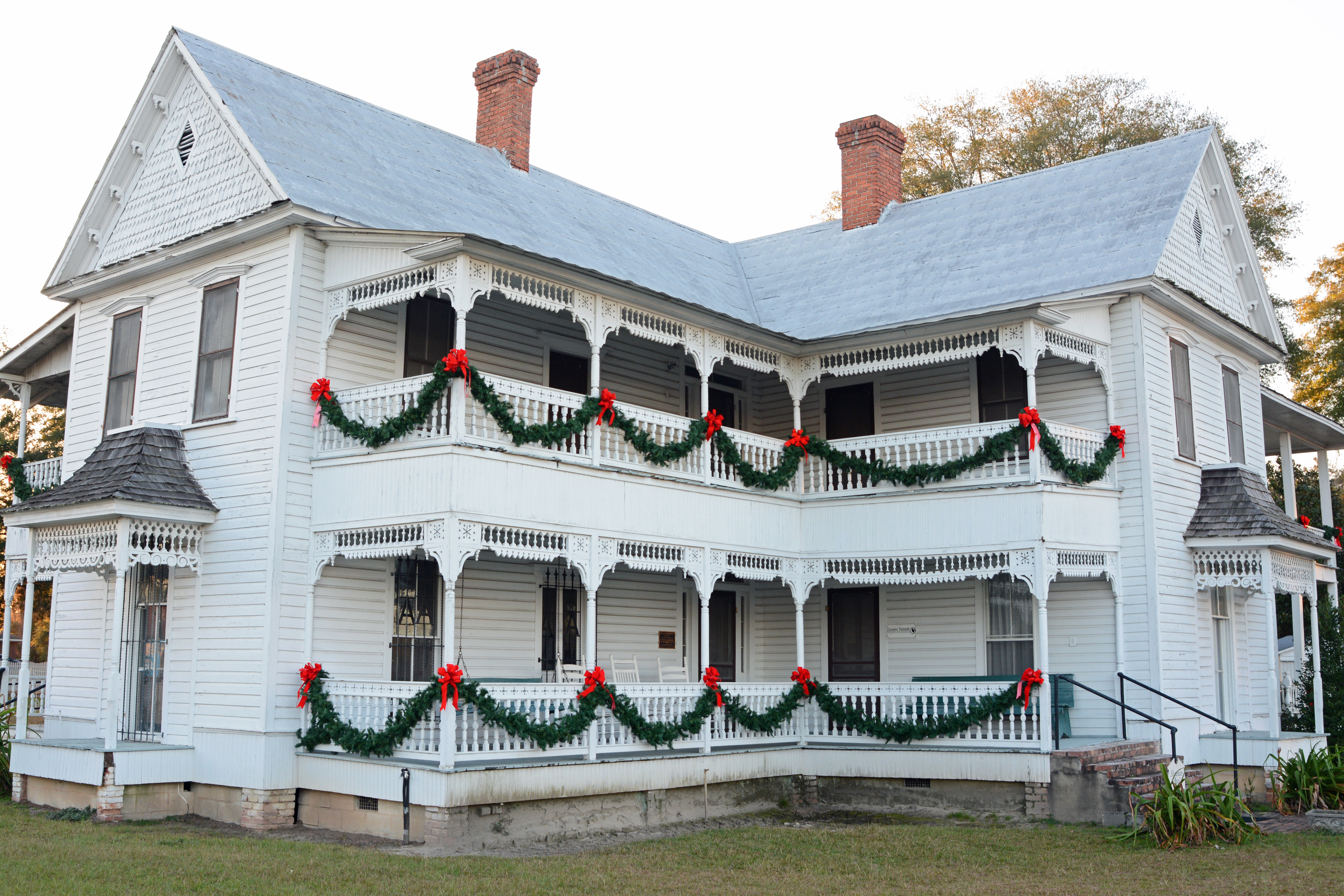
- The hotel in 2015

- Location within Georgia
- Location: 120 W. Brazell St., Reidsville, Georgia
- Coordinates: 32.08582°N 82.11932°W
- Area: 11 acres (4.5 ha)
- Built: 1892
- Built by: Nobles, D. J.
- Architect: Nobles, D. J.
- Architectural style: Late Victorian, Eclectic
- NRHP reference No.: 82002481
- Added to NRHP: June 17, 1982

The Alexander Hotel is a historic hotel in Reidsville, Tattnall County, Georgia, located at 120 West Brazell Street. It was built in 1892 and, although it is basically plain in style, it has gingerbread decorations that give it a Victorian architecture feel. It is a two-story Victorian building with two 20th-century additions. It is a wood-frame building resting on brick piers. A second wing was added in the 1920s. Part of the first-floor porch was enclosed and expanded in the 1930s. There are several historic outbuildings.

It was designed and built by carpenter D.J. Nobles, from Hagan, in Evans County.

It was added to the National Register of Historic Places in 1982.

== See also ==
- National Register of Historic Places listings in Tattnall County, Georgia
