= Glennwanis Hotel =

Historic hotel in Georgia, US

- U.S. National Register of Historic Places
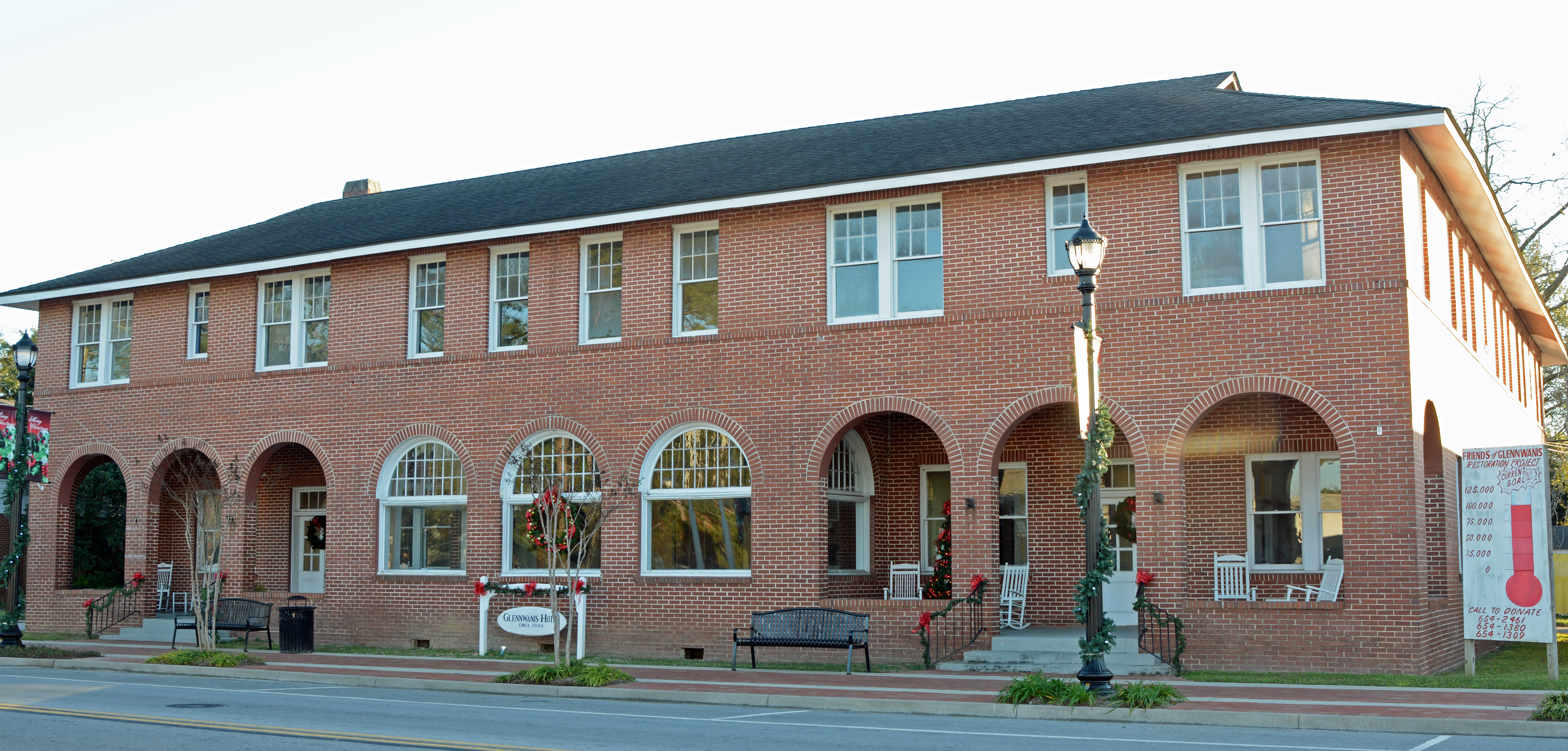
- Glennwanis Hotel in 2015

- Location within Georgia
- Location: 209-215 E. Barnard St., Glennville, Georgia
- Coordinates: 31.93542°N 81.92592°W
- Area: less than one acre
- Built: 1926
- Architect: Bacon and Rolls Contractors
- NRHP reference No.: 03000199
- Added to NRHP: April 11, 2003

The Glennwanis Hotel is a historic hotel in Glennville, Georgia, Tattnall County, Georgia, built on the site of the Hughes Hotel. The hotel is located at 209-215 East Barnard Street. The old Hughes Hotel was built out of Georgia pine circa 1905 and burned in 1920. The Glennwanis was built in brick in 1926. The local Kiwanis club led the effort to get the replacement hotel built, and organized a Glennville Hotel Company with directors being local business leaders. The wife of a local doctor won a naming contest with the name "Glennwanis Hotel", a suggestion combining "Glennville" and "Kiwanis".

The hotel is a two-story U-shaped building. The first floor has a lobby and rooms of various sizes. The second floor has rooms of various sizes. It originally had 40 guest rooms and operated as a hotel through 1981. It was originally designed for tourists but from the 1940s local people used its dining room and meeting rooms. Guest rooms have been converted into efficiency apartments.

It was added to the National Register of Historic Places on April 11, 2003.

As of 2015, funds were being raised to restore the building; and $100,000 of the $125,000 goal had been reached.

== See also ==
- National Register of Historic Places listings in Tattnall County, Georgia
