= Georgia's 4th Senate district =

American legislative district

Georgia's 4th State Senate district
Senator
Billy Hickman; R–Statesboro
- Demographics: 64.48% White; 22.60% Black; 6.49% Hispanic; 1.86% Asian; 0.23% Native American; 0.07% Hawaiian/Pacific Islander; 0.38% Other; 5.08% Multiracial
- Population (2020) • Voting age: 191,098; 146,443

District 4 of the Georgia Senate is a senatorial district in Southeast Georgia.

The district includes all of Bulloch, Candler, Effingham, and Evans counties. It also includes parts of Bloomingdale and Pooler in Chatham County.

The current senator is Billy Hickman, a Republican from Statesboro first elected in a special election in 2020.

== List of state senators ==
- Jack Hill: 1991 – April 6, 2020
- Billy Hickman: August 21, 2020 – present
