= Albert Howell =

Albert Howell may refer to:

- Albert Howell, American architect with Tucker & Howell
- Albert Howell (comedian), Canadian comedian and writer
- Albert Howell (cricketer), English cricketer
