= Julian Hoke Harris =

American artist (1906–1987)

- Born: August 26, 1906; Carrollton, Georgia
- Died: January 25, 1987 (aged 80)
- Education: Georgia Institute of Technology
- Known for: sculpture

Julian Hoke Harris (August 26, 1906 – January 25, 1987) was an American artist.

== Life ==
He was born in Carrollton, Georgia in 1906 the youngest child of Joseph and Margaret Harris. His father owned Harris Hardware on the square in Carrollton. He graduated from Georgia Tech in 1928 with a B.S. in architecture. In 1930, he enrolled at the Pennsylvania Academy of the Fine Arts. After the first year of study, he was granted by the Academy a full scholarship for the remaining three years. He graduated in 1934 and returned to Atlanta Georgia. He was licensed by the State of Georgia as an architect and worked briefly for architect Philip Schutze. That same year, he opened his sculpture studio and by the close of his first year was sculpting full-time. He worked as a sculptor based in Atlanta until his death in 1987.

During World War II, Harris served as a Major in the United States Army during the India-Burma Theatre.

At Georgia Tech, he did ten busts of famous engineers and scientists, the bronze gate of the Naval Armory, and the stained glass window in Brittain Dining Hall. He also taught architecture part-time in the College of Architecture for 34 years.

He worked alongside the architectural firm of Tucker & Howell on various projects and sculpted a frieze at Georgia State Prison depicting figures embodying various trades and occupations. Other collaborations with architectural firms in Atlanta include the Morris Plan Bank (1936, razed), zoo buildings (1950s), the Department of Agriculture Building (1954), the Commerce Building (1959), and the DeKalb County Federal Savings and Loan Building (1963) in Conyers, Georgia.

He was elected into the National Academy of Design in 1976 as an Associate member and became a full Academician in 1979. While a student at Georgia Tech, he was a member of the Beta Theta Pi fraternity.

== Works ==
- Georgia Tech projects
- Georgia State Prison frieze
- Cedartown [West] Theater (1941) relief sculpture
- Stuart A. Rose Manuscript, Archives, and Rare Book Library
- Two metal bas-relief sculptures on Old Fulton County Department of Health and Wellness building in Atlanta, GA. The pieces are titled; "Keeping Away Death" and "Keeping Away Old Age" and are also known, according to Harris, as "Preventative Medicine" and "Geriatrics."
