= Mendes, Georgia =

- Unincorporated community Census-designated place
- Location within Georgia
- Coordinates: 31°59′56″N 81°58′26″W
- Country: United States
- State: Georgia
- County: Tattnall

Area
  - Total: 0.61 sq mi (1.59 km^{2})
  - Land: 0.61 sq mi (1.57 km^{2})
  - Water: 0.0077 sq mi (0.02 km^{2})
- Elevation: 174 ft (53 m)

Population (2020)
  - Total: 124
  - Density: 204.9/sq mi (79.13/km^{2})
- Time zone: UTC-5 (Eastern (EST))
  - Summer (DST): UTC-4 (EDT)
- ZIP code: 30427
- Area code: 912
- GNIS feature ID: 2587039

Mendes is a census-designated place and unincorporated community in Tattnall County, Georgia, United States. Its population was 124 as of the 2020 census. Georgia State Route 169 passes through the community.

== Demographics ==
Historical population
Census	Pop.	Note	%±
2010	122		—
2020	124		1.6%
1980-2000; 2010 2020

Mendes was first listed as a census designated place in the 2010 U.S. census.

Mendes, Georgia – Racial and ethnic composition Note: the US Census treats Hispanic/Latino as an ethnic category. This table excludes Latinos from the racial categories and assigns them to a separate category. Hispanics/Latinos may be of any race.
Race / Ethnicity (NH = Non-Hispanic)	Pop 2010	Pop 2020	% 2010	% 2020
White alone (NH)	119	115	97.54%	92.74%
Black or African American alone (NH)	0	7	0.00%	5.65%
Native American or Alaska Native alone (NH)	0	1	0.00%	0.81%
Asian alone (NH)	0	0	0.00%	0.00%
Native Hawaiian or Pacific Islander alone (NH)	0	0	0.00%	0.00%
Other race alone (NH)	0	0	0.00%	0.00%
Mixed race or Multiracial (NH)	1	1	0.82%	0.81%
Hispanic or Latino (any race)	2	0	1.64%	0.00%
Total	122	124	100.00%	100.00%
