= Tattnall County High School =

Public high school in Georgia, United States

Location
- 1 Battle Creek Warrior Blvd; Reidsville, Georgia 30453; United States; 32.03849°N 82.04913°W

Information
- School type: Public high school
- Denomination: Tattnall County School District
- Principal: Lakisha R. Bobbitt
- Teaching staff: 69.10 (on an FTE basis)
- Grades: 9–12
- Gender: Co-ed
- Student to teacher ratio: 15.44
- Colors: Navy and gold
- Team name: Battle Creek Warriors
- Accreditation: Southern Association of Colleges and Schools
- Yearbook: Navy and Gold
- Website: Website

Tattnall County High School is a public high school located in unincorporated Tattnall County, Georgia, United States, near Reidsville. The school is part of the Tattnall County School District, serving Tattnall County.
