= Billy Hickman =

American politician (born 1952)

Member of the Georgia State Senate from the 4th district
- Incumbent
- Assumed office August 21, 2020
- Preceded by: Jack Hill

Personal details
- Born: September 7, 1952 (age 74)
- Party: Republican
- Spouse: Jo Ann Hickman

William Rhett Hickman (born September 7, 1952) is an American politician from Georgia. Hickman is a Republican member of the Georgia State Senate for District 4.

In January 2024, Hickman co-sponsored S.B. 390, which would withhold government funding for any libraries in Georgia affiliated with the American Library Association.
