= Brittain Dining Hall =

Georgia Institute of Technology dining hall

Coordinates: 33.772479°N 84.391375°W

Marion L. Brittain Dining Hall
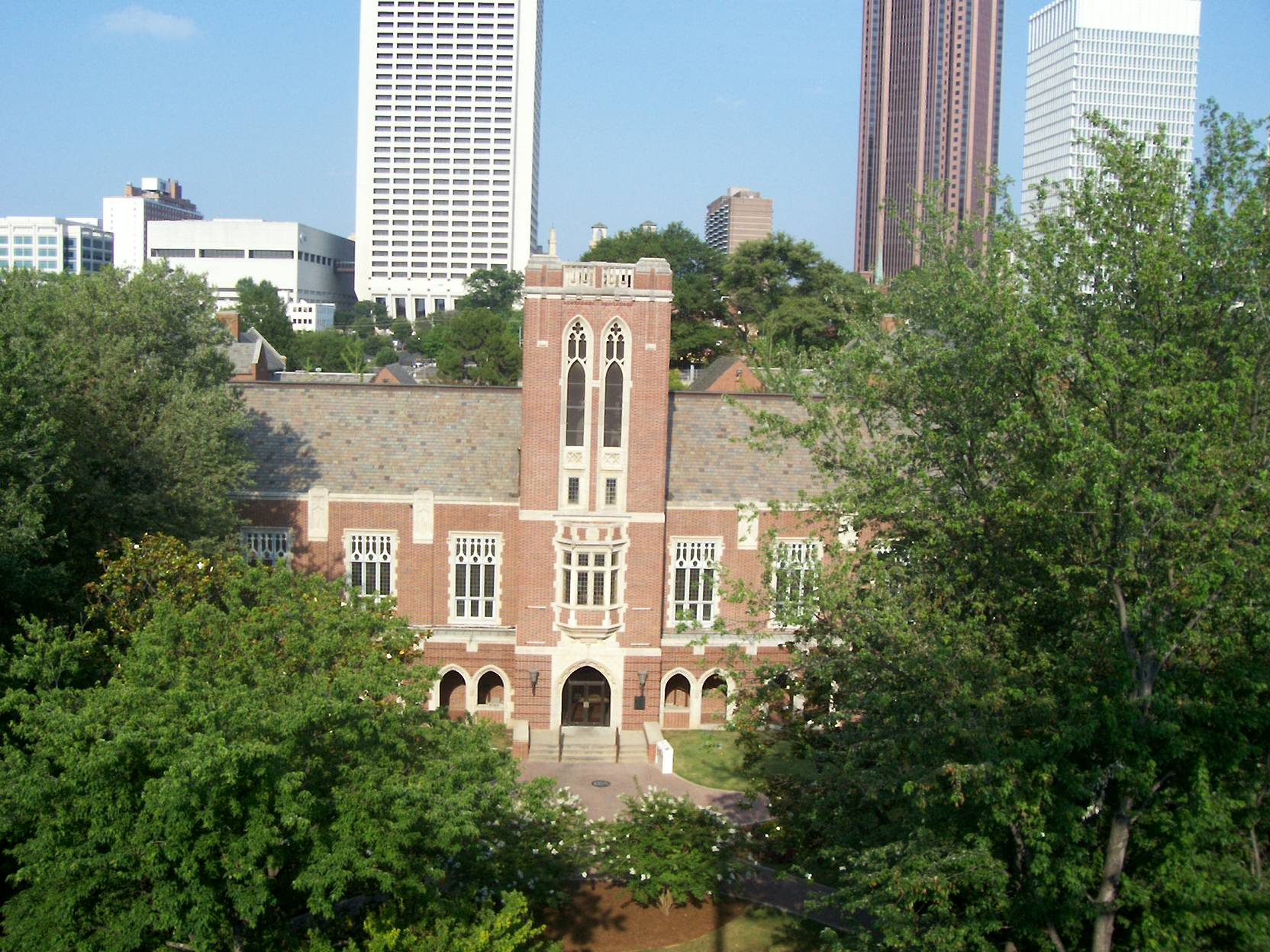
- Type: Dining Hall
- Established: 1928
- Location: Atlanta, Georgia, USA
- Campus: FE East
- Dining patrons: 290-350
- Website: Georgia Tech Dining

Brittain Dining Hall is a dining hall on the East Campus of the Georgia Institute of Technology in Atlanta, Georgia. Opened in 1928, it is named after former institute president Marion L. Brittain, and it serves as the primary dining location for all Freshman Experience and Area II housing residents. It is located on Techwood Drive across from Bobby Dodd Stadium. In 2024, it was closed for renovation and reopened in 2026.

== History ==
While it was partially funded by the state of Georgia, a large part of the funding for Brittain Dining Hall came from the Athletic Association and the Georgia Tech Expansion Fund. Opened in 1928, it was a joint effort of many of Tech's departments:

[T]he architecture department designed the building, the ceramics department manufactured the tile for the floor of the tower, the mechanical engineering department supplied the wrought iron for the light fixtures in the main hall, and the textile department made tapestries for the walls.

The building cost $418,000 to construct and was designed by the architects Bush-Brown & Gailey. Brittain Dining Hall was renovated in 1964, 1999, 2002, and again in summer 2007.

During the 2007 heatwave, Brittain Dining Hall went trayless to conserve water due to Atlanta, Georgia's severe water shortage.

Brittain Dining Hall was closed in Fall 2024 due to looming safety issues. Renovations are anticipated to cost over $10 million and include work on electrical issues, lighting, and flooring.

== Architecture ==
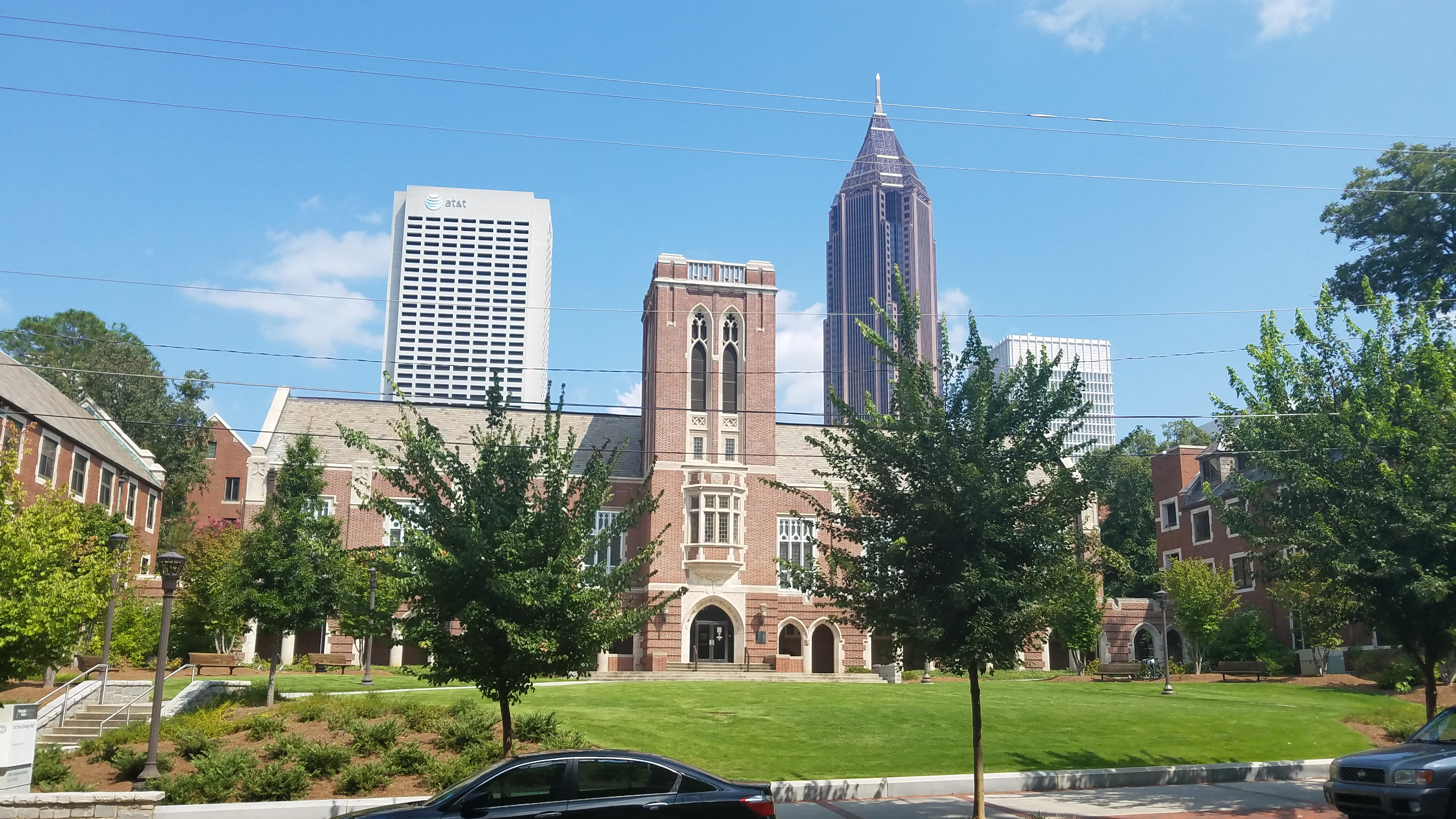
Brittain Dining Hall, with AT&T Midtown Center and Bank of America Plaza in background

Brittain is based around two large wings that serve as dining areas. Patrons enter from the western entrance and serve themselves via the buffet. In between the two wings there is a staircase that leads up to a lobby, which overlooks the two wings and leads to the President's Dining Room. The President's Dining Room looks out on to the western lawn of Brittain, and was originally designed for serving the institute's president and visiting dignitaries but was eventually converted to a dining area. In recent years however, there has once more been a restriction on the use of this second floor dining area because of the tendency of the institute's students to put new meaning to "food on the fly".

The southern wing is highlighted by a large stained glass window designed by Julian Harris. The window was dedicated to Georgia Tech graduating classes of 1928–1932. The entrance is marked by a Georgia School of Technology floor seal showing the age of Brittain Hall.

The back of Brittain dubbed "Brittain Rec" serves as the laundromat and meeting place for the Freshman Experience Program. Brittain Rec is divided into a Buzz Card activated laundry room, BuzzBy, East Side Market, and a ballroom for events.

=== Innovator dedications ===
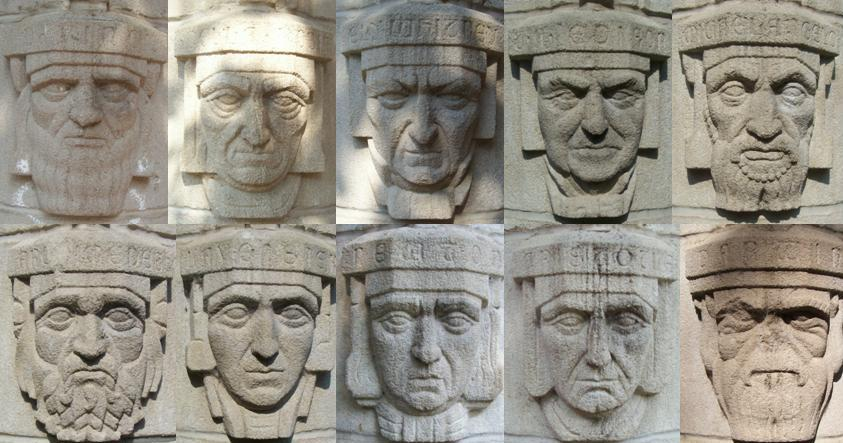
Top row, left to right: Leonardo da Vinci, Luca della Robia, Eli Whitney, Thomas Edison, Michaelangelo Bottom row, left to right: Archimedes, Antoine Lavoisier, Isaac Newton, Aristotle, Charles Darwin

Brittain Hall's Western Side faces Techwood Drive and Bobby Dodd Stadium. This side is the only entrance for patrons and features ten Doric pillars emblazoned with stylized busts of ten famous scientific minds and the fields to which they contributed; these are fields that were present at Georgia Tech during Brittain's 1928 construction. Civil engineering, mechanical engineering, and aerospace engineering are represented by Leonardo da Vinci. Ceramics is represented by Luca della Robbia. Textiles is represented by Eli Whitney. Electrical engineering is represented by Thomas Edison. Architecture and the fine arts are represented by Michelangelo. Physics is represented by Archimedes. Chemistry is represented by Antoine Lavoisier. Mathematics and astronomy are represented by Isaac Newton. Biology is represented by Aristotle. Ecology is represented by Charles Darwin.
