= Morris Plan Banks =

20th century United States banking network

Morris Plan Banks were part of a historic banking system in the United States created to assist the middle class in obtaining loans that were often difficult to obtain at traditional banks. They were established by Arthur J. Morris (1881–1973), a lawyer in Norfolk, Virginia, who noticed the difficulty his working clients had in getting loans. The first was started in 1910 in Norfolk, and the second in Atlanta in 1911.

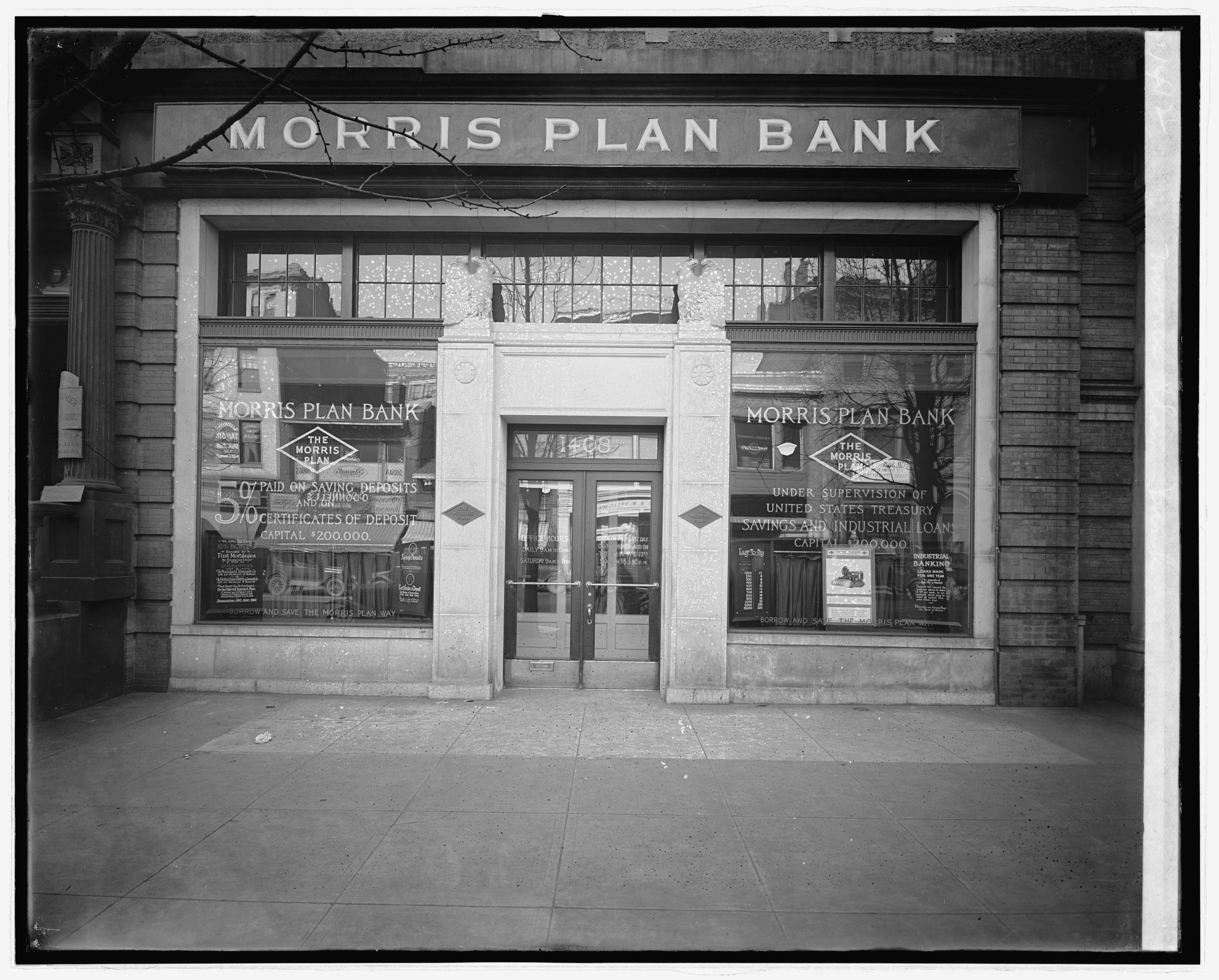
A Morris Plan Bank, location unknown, c. 1910–1925

The plans established installment credit for customers. Lending required the borrower to provide references and proof of earnings to establish the borrower's credit worthiness. The banks gave depositors interest to secure funds for the loans. The banks were eventually organized as a New York-based banking organization (holding company) and made small loans to moderate income families through banks in more than 100 U.S. cities. In 1917, credit life insurance plans were offered. Morris Banks made 1,760,000 loans in its first 12 years, amounting to about $320 million.

The banks were affected by the Great Depression and changes to the banking industry in its aftermath.

== Origins of the concept ==
In 1910, attorney Arthur J. Morris (1881–1973) opened the Fidelity Savings and Trust Company in Norfolk, Virginia, which made small loans to working people under a concept he called "Morris Plan". Under this lending approach, would-be borrowers had to submit references from two people of like character and earnings power who would guarantee the borrower's creditworthiness, and agreed to repay the face value of the loan through the purchase of Thrift Certificates in weekly installments. Morris Plan Banks expanded to more than 100 locations in the United States. At the time Morris Plan banks first appeared in 1910, few institutions existed for provision of consumer credit to low-and middle-income individuals.

== History ==
Morris Plan banks expanded relying on state charters just as did the nascent credit union movement. By 1931, there were 109 Morris Plan banks operating in over 100 cities with an annual loan volume about $220,000,000.

“Walter W. Head, past president of American Bankers Assn., was elected president of Morris Plan Corp. of America, succeeding Austin L. Babcock. Morris Plan Corp. has large stock holdings in all the Morris Plan banks, the largest industrial banking system in the U. S. In the last 21 years these banks loaned $1,750,000,000 to 7,000,000 people, and now do about $200,000,000 annual business with 800,000 customers.”

Morris Plan banks pioneered the use of automotive financing through arrangements between the Morris Plan Company of America, the holding company for Morris Plan banks, and the Studebaker Corporation. In 1917 through the subsidiary Morris Plan Insurance Society, credit life insurance was offered to pay off any outstanding loan balance if the borrower died. Any insurance left over went to the borrower’s estate.

== Morris Plan ==
=== Morris Plan Bank of Virginia ===
Opened in July 17 of 1922, the Morris Plan Bank of Virginia made loans based on “Character as the Prime Collateral.” Solicitors soon obtained over 2,000 savings accounts, and the volume of loans to individuals began to develop. The great majority of loans were made to persons seeking to borrow $100 to $300, who offered their notes, in keeping with the bank’s regulations, to run for twelve months, endorsed by two friends, relatives, or fellow-workers. At the same time the borrower agreed to open a savings account at the end of a week or two weeks or a month, as determined at the time of the loan. He agreed to deposit in the account at regular intervals 1/50 or 1/24 or 1/12 of the amount of his loan, so that at the end of twelve months there would be on deposit an amount, exactly equal to his note. He agreed in writing not to withdraw any funds from this savings account, but assigned it to the bank as additional collateral to his loan for the protection of his co-makers as well as the bank. That, then, was "The Morris Plan".

==== Morris’s Principles of Lending to the Poor ====
Morris Plan banks can be traced to the concerns of Arthur J. Morris. Mr. Morris, a Virginia lawyer, found it troubling that a securely employed workman, seeking a small loan, was denied access to credit from local banks and was forced to borrow from loan sharks. Morris thought that a country that denied bank loans to a large part of its population had a “weak spot” in its banking system. Morris then began a study of the various banking laws in the U.S. in the hopes that some type of “banking institution could be evolved that would correct the existing evils and supply credit to the needy” (Herzog 1928, 12-13). Morris’ study resulted in his establishing a set of principles for lending to the poor.

Those principles were:

1. Character, plus earning power, is a proper basis of credit.

2. Loans made on this basis of credit must carry the privilege of repayment over a period long enough to match the earning power of the borrower.

3. Borrowed money should always be for some constructive and useful purpose.

==== 3% interest allowed on assigned deposits ====
It was decided that 3% would be allowed on savings deposits required against loans, this interest to be computed on a quarterly basis. The rate of 6% with 3% interest allowed on as signed deposits was adopted in May 1928, by the National City Bank of New York — The Morris Plan Bank of Virginia being then the only institution in the United States making loans on such an economical basis for the small borrower.

=== Critics ===
Russell Sage Foundation viewed the lending procedure to be misleading at best, and at worst, an attempt to defraud the borrowers. Hence, many viewed the profit-seeking Morris Plan institutions as little better, and in some respects worse, than loan sharks.

== Officials ==
H. Ross Ake was secretary-treasurer and manager of the Canton, Ohio, Morris Plan Bank from its founding in 1916. He also was on the Board of Governors of the National Association of Morris Plan Bankers.

In 1929, Walter W. Head took over as president of State Bank of Chicago and guided it through a merger with Foreman National. When Foreman National was acquired by First National Bank in 1931, Head resigned to become president of Morris Plan Corp. At the time, Morris Plan was the largest industrial banking system in the U.S., with $200 million in annual business and 800,000 customers.

== Locations and bank building architecture ==
- The Industrial Morris Plan Bank of Detroit opened in 1917, while its final location at the corner of Washington Boulevard and Grand River Avenue was completed and opened in 1926. The new Industrial Bank Building, with 25 floors and a "distinctive Modern Renaissance design", was one of many Detroit structures built on Washington Boulevard by architect Louis Kamper in the 1920s and 1930s. Converted to apartments in 1981, it remains a significant historical and architectural landmark.
- The Morris Plan Bank Building at 25 Canal Street in Providence, Rhode Island (1926) was designed by Jackson, Robertson & Adams.
- The Morris Plan Company Los Angeles office was located at 835 South Spring Street.
- The Morris Plan Company Long Beach office was located at 11 Pine Avenue.
- The Morris Plan Bank Building in Atlanta (1936) was designed by Tucker & Howell. It was demolished.
- The Hulman Building in downtown Evansville, Indiana, was built as Central Union Bank and became a Morris Plan Bank location. It is listed on the National Register of Historic Places. It is a ten story art deco high rise constructed from 1928 until 1930 with a brick facade of light yellow. It was the first of several Art Deco buildings to grace Evansville's skyline.
- The Morris Plan Bank of Richmond was the system's 107th.
- Morris Plan Bank in Syracuse, New York
- Morris Plan Bank in Indianapolis (1921) at 110 East Washington Street. It merged with Schloss Brothers Savings and Loan in 1936. A third of Marion County families had accounts. It was branchless until 1967 when the legislature allowed it to open branches. It was bought out by Firstmark Corporation in the 1970s. When that bank ran into trouble, Morris depositors lost money.
- The Morris Plan Company of Terre Haute, Indiana, continued to operate even after it became a subsidiary of First Financial Corporation (FFC); however, it will be merged into FFC's First Financial Bank, effective December 31, 2021.

== Legacy ==
Morris graduated from the University of Virginia and made donations at the end of his life to help fund a law library constructed in 1974 and named for him.

== See also ==
- Industrial loan company
