= First Financial Bank =

U.S. financial services company

First Financial Corporation
- Trade name: First Financial Bank
- Company type: Public
- Traded as: Nasdaq: THFF; Russell 2000 Component
- Industry: Finance
- Founded: 1834; 192 years ago (as the Terre Haute branch of the Second State Bank of Indiana)
- Headquarters: Terre Haute, Indiana, US
- Area served: Indiana, Illinois, Kentucky, Tennessee
- Key people: Norman D. Lowery (vice chairman & CEO)
- Products: Financial services
- Number of employees: More than 2000 (2010)
- Website: first-online.bank

First Financial Bank is a regional bank operated by First Financial Corporation and based in Terre Haute, Indiana. It is the oldest national bank in Indiana and the fifth oldest national bank in the United States. First Financial Corporation is Vigo County's only publicly traded company.

== History ==
The bank was founded in 1834 as a branch of the Second State Bank of Indiana and later became known as Terre Haute First National Bank. In 1983, First Financial Corporation was established as the bank's holding company, and in August 1984 it became Indiana's first multi-bank holding company. After mergers and acquisitions, the various banks affiliated as First Financial Bank in 2003.

For most of its existence, First Financial operated largely in the Indiana and Illinois counties around Terre Haute, but two recent mergers greatly expanded the corporation's footprint into Kentucky.

As a result of the mergers in 2019 and 2021, First Financial Bank now operates banking centers and loan production offices in Indiana, Illinois, Kentucky and Tennessee.

=== Indiana ===
In September 2021, First Financial Corporation announced on September 27 that The Morris Plan Company of Terre Haute, long a subsidiary of the company, would be merged into First Financial Bank, effective December 31, 2021.

=== Illinois ===
In October 2011, First Financial Corporation announced the pending acquisition of the Pontiac-based PNB Holding Company with its only subsidiary, the Freestar Bank, which has 13 offices in Central Illinois.

In March 2013, First Financial Corp. acquired 9 branch offices in central and southern Illinois from Bank of America.

=== Kentucky ===
On July 29, 2019, First Financial Corporation announced completion of its merger with HopFed Bancorp, Inc. (HFBC) and the merger of First Financial Bank with HFBC's wholly owned subsidiary, Heritage Bank USA, based in Hopkinsville.

In August 2021, First Financial Bank announced that it was acquiring Hancock Bank & Trust, a longtime community bank based in Hawesville. The deal, which added branch locations in Hawesville, Lewisport, Madisonville, Cloverport and Bowling Green in Kentucky to the First Financial portfolio, was valued at $31.3 million ($18.38/share).

== Services ==
The company offers cash management services, lease financing, debit cards, online banking, and other electronically accessed banking services. First Financial Bank also provides various services, including investment advisory and wealth management, investment and brokerage, and investment consulting.
