= Georgia State Prison =

Former prison in Georgia, United States

Coordinates: 32°00′13″N 82°09′52″W

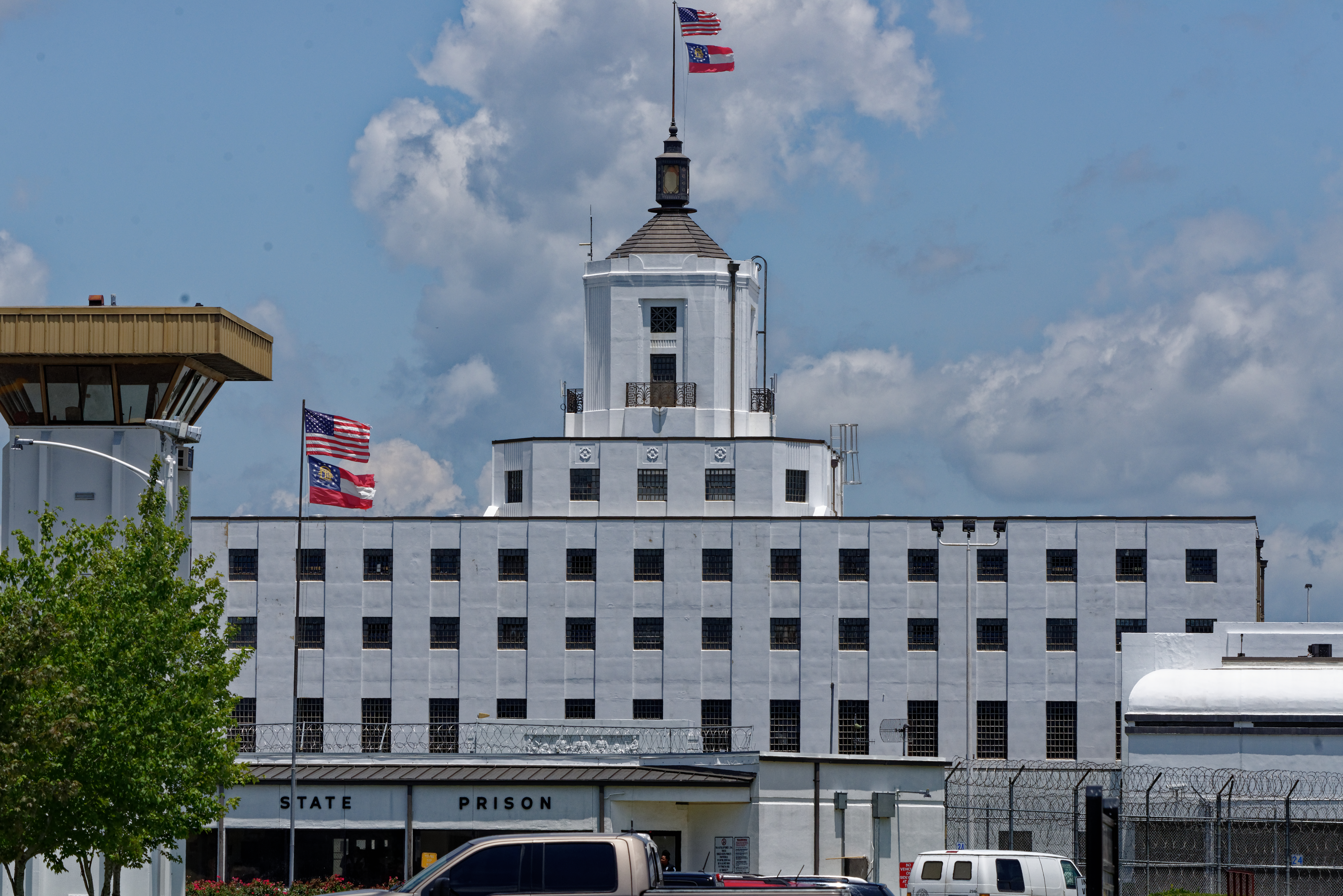
- Interactive map of Georgia State Prison
- Location: 300 1st Avenue South Reidsville, Georgia address United States
- Status: Closed
- Security class: mixed
- Capacity: 1550
- Opened: 1938
- Closed: 2022
- Managed by: Georgia Department of Corrections
- Warden: Trevonza Bobbitt

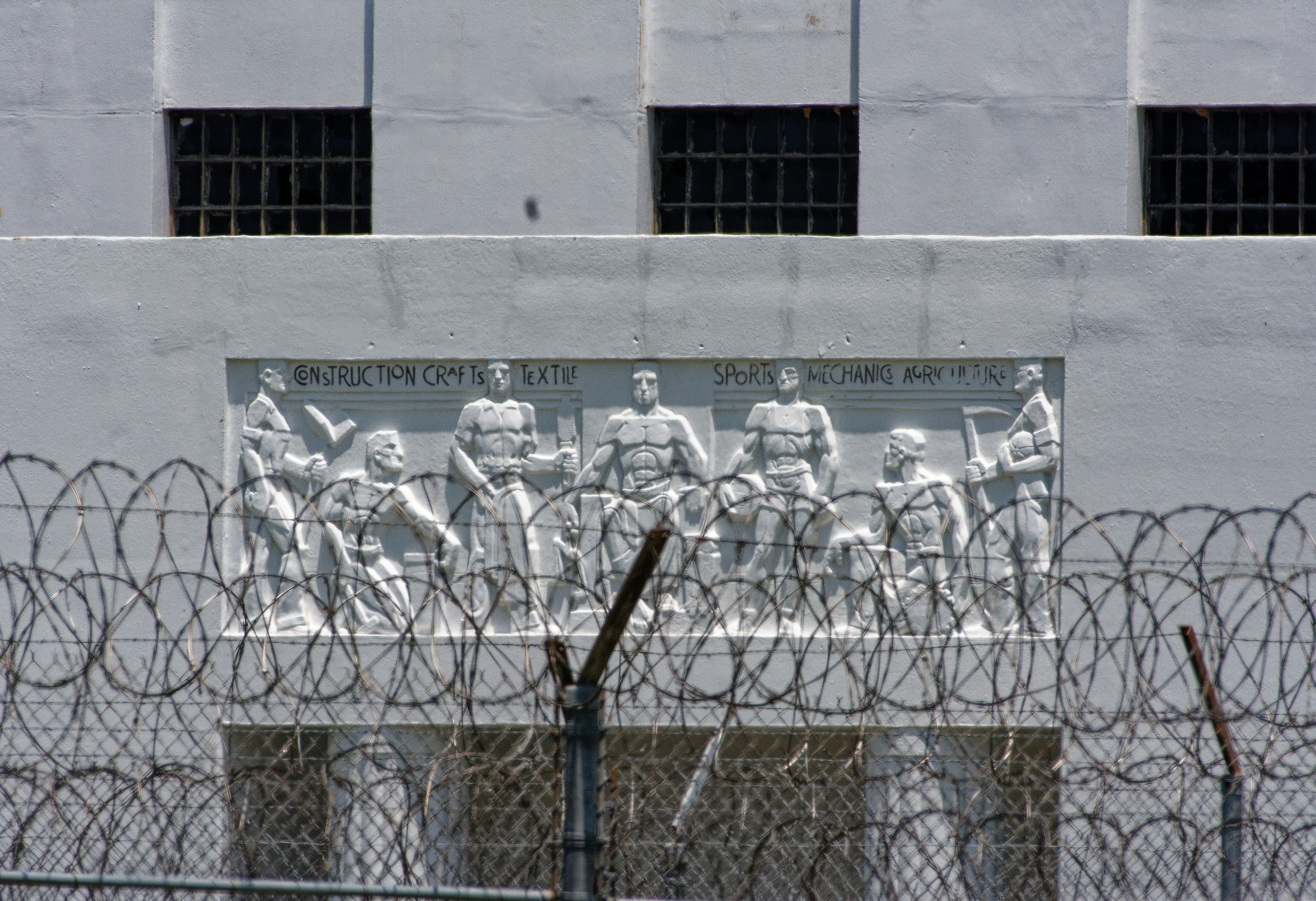
Rehabilitation

Georgia State Prison was the main maximum-security facility in the US state of Georgia for the Georgia Department of Corrections. It was located in unincorporated Tattnall County. First opened in 1938, the prison housed some of the most dangerous inmates in the state's history, and it was the site of Georgia's death row until 1980.

Despite a published capacity of 1,530, the facility housed approximately 1,900 inmates, with a wide range of security levels from Minimum to Close. The last warden was Trevonza Bobbitt.

The historic prison building stands at 300 1st Avenue South near Reidsville, Georgia. The state's extensive farm operation, Rogers State Prison, is also nearby - about a mile away.

== History ==
The facility was designed by Atlanta architects Tucker & Howell. The modern classic architecture included a central tower and courtyard, and frieze by Julian Harris titled Rehabilitation depicting trades and occupations. It opened in 1937. The building had been extensively renovated and expanded since.

On January 1, 1938, Georgia's death row and execution chamber relocated from the old state prison at Milledgeville, where it had been since the September 13, 1924 execution of 22-year-old Howard Hinton, to GSP. One of the prisoners executed here was Lena Baker, an African American maid from Cuthbert, Georgia, who had been wrongfully convicted of murdering her employer. Killed in March 1945, she remains the only woman electrocuted by the state.

From 1964 until 1976 the U.S. Supreme Court suspended executions. Then in June 1980 Georgia's site of execution was moved to the Georgia Diagnostic and Classification State Prison (GD&CP) near Jackson, Georgia in Butts County. A new electric chair was installed in place of the previous one, which was put on display on the upper floors of the main building.

Also on display are prison documents containing names, authorizations, and last statements of the prisoners. In the 1940s and 1950s, volunteers were offered $25 to flip the switches which would start the flow of electricity and eventually lead to the death of the prisoner. Inmates would often be doused with saltwater to improve the electrical connection and to hasten death.

Georgia State Prison was the first US prison to be accredited by the American Medical Association and the American Correctional Association.

The facility was the filming location of the film The Longest Yard that starred Burt Reynolds, Eddie Albert, and James Hampton.

The prison was closed by the Georgia Department of Corrections on February 19, 2022, due to aging infrastructure and the need to safely house larger numbers of violent inmates and gang members. Prior to closure, all prisoners had been transferred to other locations.

== Notable prisoners ==
Dr. Martin Luther King Jr., with others, was arrested at an Atlanta sit-in on October 19, 1960. While the others were released, King was held regarding a previous traffic case and was transferred to the Georgia State Prison in Reidsville, Georgia on October 22, where he was a prisoner until October 29; pressure from soon-to-be president John F. Kennedy, and the entire Kennedy family, saw King released on a $2,000 bond.

Until 2007, when he was transferred to the United States Penitentiary, Tucson, GSP housed activist H. Rap Brown, now known as Jamil Al-Amin. Al-Amin was the chairman of Student Nonviolent Coordinating Committee in the late 1960s, and was found guilty of murder in 2000.
