= Jack Hill (politician) =

American politician (1944–2020)

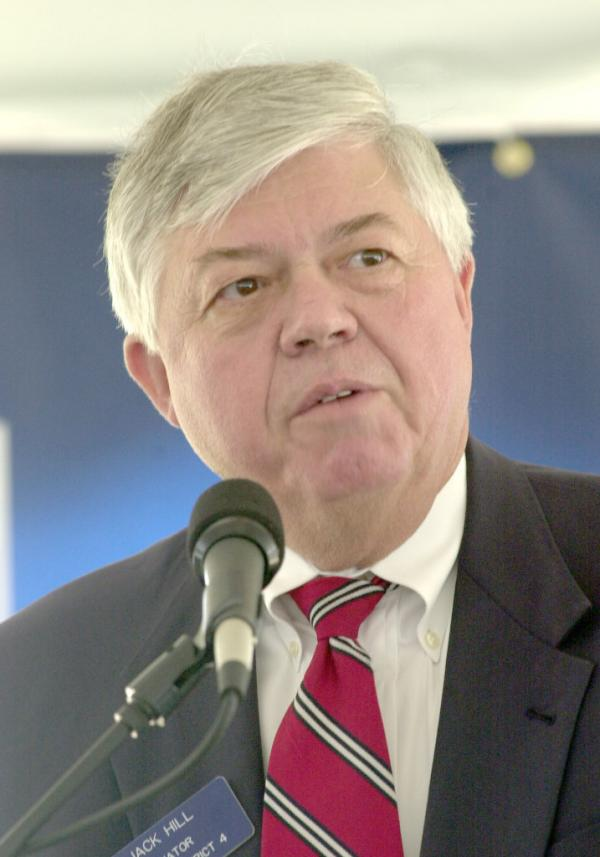
- Hill speaking in Reidsville in 2010

Member of the Georgia Senate from the 4th district
- In office January 14, 1991 – April 6, 2020
- Preceded by: Joe Kennedy
- Succeeded by: Billy Hickman

Personal details
- Born: July 15, 1944 Reidsville, Georgia, U.S.
- Died: April 6, 2020 (aged 75) Reidsville, Georgia, U.S.
- Party: Republican (2002–2020)
- Other political affiliations: Democratic (before 2002)
- Spouse: Ruth Ann Nail (m. 1972)

Jack Sutton Hill (July 15, 1944 – April 6, 2020) was an American politician. A member of the Republican Party, he represented Georgia's 4th District in the Georgia State Senate. At the time of his death, he was the longest-serving Georgia State Senator.

== Personal ==
Jack Hill was born in Reidsville, Georgia. He was a retired grocer and his wife, Ruth Ann, was an elementary school principal. Together, they had three children and seven grandchildren.

Hill was a graduate of Reidsville High School and Georgia Southern University.

He served in the Georgia Air National Guard for 33 years, both as a unit commander and State Inspector General. Hill died on April 6, 2020. His wife, Ruth Ann Nail Hill, died less than three weeks later on April 24, 2020.

== Political career ==
Re-elected in 2018 to his 15th two-year term, Senator Hill was first elected to the Georgia State Senate in 1990.

Senator Hill was the Chairman of the Senate Appropriations Committee, and under his leadership Georgia maintained the highest bond rating awarded, a "Triple A," from the national rating agencies.

Senator Hill also served as the Vice Chairman of the Senate Rules Committee. He also served on the Natural Resources and the Environment and Regulated Industries and Utilities, and was an ex-officio member of the Finance Committee. Past chairmanships include: K-12 Education, Ethics, and Higher Education.

Senator Hill represented Georgia's 4th Senatorial District which includes: Bulloch, Candler, Effingham, Emanuel (pt.), Evans and Tattnall (pt.) counties.

== Legacy ==
Gordonia-Alatamaha State Park was renamed Jack Hill State Park following his death. In February 2021, Georgia Southern University announced plans to build the Hill Convocation Center to replace Hanner Fieldhouse; the new arena was named after both Jack and Ruth Ann Hill and is projected to open in the fall of 2024.
