= Marion L. Brittain =

Georgia Institute of Technology University president

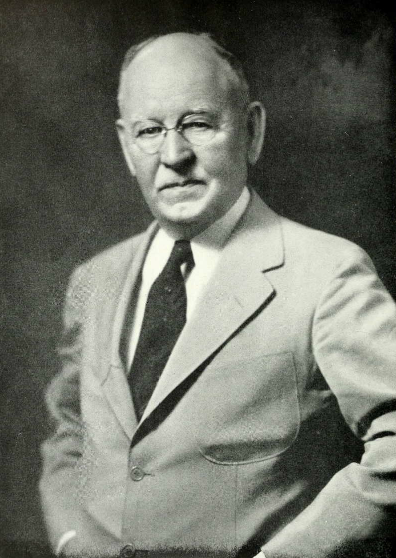
- Brittain from The 1944 Blue Print
- Born: Marion Luther Brittain; November 11, 1866; Wilkes County, Georgia, U.S.
- Died: July 13, 1953 (aged 86)
- Occupation: University president

Marion Luther Brittain Sr. (November 11, 1866 – July 13, 1953) was an American academic administrator and longest serving president of the Georgia Institute of Technology from 1922 to 1944. Brittain was born in Georgia and, aside from a brief stint at the University of Chicago for graduate school, spent most of his life serving the educational community there. After receiving a Bachelor of Arts degree from Emory College in 1886, Brittain worked his way up the ranks from principal of an Atlanta high school to superintendent of education for the entire state of Georgia.

In 1922, Brittain accepted the position of president of the Georgia Institute of Technology, then called the Georgia School of Technology, an office he would hold until his retirement in 1944. During his 22-year tenure at Georgia Tech, Brittain was credited with doubling student enrollment, establishing what is now the second-largest aerospace engineering faculty in the United States, and playing an influential role in securing Georgia Tech's position as a leading technical institute and research university. After his retirement, Brittain wrote The Story of Georgia Tech (1948), a history of the Institute published shortly before his death in 1953.

== Early life ==
Marion L. Brittain was born in Wilkes County, Georgia in 1866 to Dr. J. M. Brittain, a Baptist minister, and Ida Callaway, granddaughter of Baptist minister Enoch Callaway. Brittain's childhood was spent in a variety of towns and cities throughout the state of Georgia due to his father's career as a minister. He attended Emory College for his undergraduate studies, graduating in 1886 with the commendation that he was the "best student in his department the college had had in ten years." Brittain then spent ten years as an administrator of several high schools in the Atlanta, Georgia area. In 1897, he gained local fame for his erudition after winning a contest held by the Atlanta Constitution in which he was able to identify the missing word from a passage taken from an obscure book on English literature. Brittain later graduated from the University of Chicago in 1898.

On December 5, 1899, Brittain and Lettie McDonald, daughter of Baptist minister Dr. Henry McDonald, were married. He returned to academic administration, first as superintendent of the Fulton County School System (1900–1910) and later, at the appointment of Joseph Mackey Brown, the education system for the entire state of Georgia (1910–1922). In this role, Brittain became well known for fighting corruption and generally improving the education system. Throughout this time, Brittain earned LL.D. degrees from Mercer University (1919), and, later, the University of Georgia (1927) and Emory University (1928). He was also president of the Georgia Education Association in 1906, of the Southern Education Association in 1913, and of the Council of State School Superintendents of the United States in 1917. He earned the wrath of Senator Tom Watson during these positions, who attempted to remove Brittain from his position as superintendent of education.

== President of Georgia Tech ==
On August 1, 1922, Brittain was elected president of the Georgia School of Technology (Georgia Tech). During his tenure, Brittain was able to convince the state of Georgia to increase funding for the institute. He had noted in the 1923 annual report that "there are more students in Georgia Tech than in any other two colleges in Georgia, and we have the smallest appropriation of them all." Additionally, a $300,000 grant (equivalent to $5,781,872.51 in 2025) from the Guggenheim Foundation allowed Brittain to establish the David Guggenheim School of Aeronautics at Georgia Tech. In 1930, Brittain's decision to use the money for a School of Aeronautics was controversial; today, the David Guggenheim School of Aerospace Engineering boasts the second-largest faculty in the United States behind MIT.

Other accomplishments during Brittain's administration included a doubling of Georgia Tech's enrollment, the first ROTC unit in the Southern United States, accreditation for the Institute by the Southern Association of Colleges and Secondary Schools, and the creation of a new ceramic engineering department, building, and major that attracted the American Ceramics Society's national convention to Atlanta. Perhaps most significantly, Brittain is attributed with providing the vision and securing the finances to move Georgia Tech away from its roots as a teaching-oriented trade school and towards a new focus on science and technology research.

Brittain was known by reputation as a kind, gentle man and was well-liked by students and faculty. He was especially remembered for his dedication to the Georgia Tech Yellow Jackets football team, attending nearly every game including those taking place out of state. Outside of Georgia Tech, Brittain taught Sunday school classes and maintained active membership in a number of service organizations. Brittain retired from his position as president of Georgia Tech in 1944, after which he penned a history of the Institute entitled The Story of Georgia Tech, completed in 1948. He died in 1953, survived by three children: McDonald, Marion Luther Jr., and Ida; three grandsons, and a great-granddaughter. Flags at the university were flown at half-staff for a month in remembrance of Brittain, and classes were cancelled for the rest of the school week.

== Legacy ==
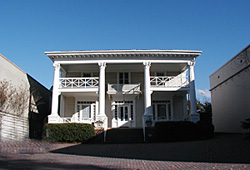
Entrance to Dr. Marion Luther Brittain Sr. House

Long after his death, Brittain continues to be remembered through several prestigious awards named in his honor. The Marion L. Brittain Fellows Program, established in 1990, awards postdoctoral fellowships to teach in the Communications Program at Georgia Tech's School of Literature, Communication, and Culture for up to three years. At Emory University, the Marion Luther Brittain Award is presented annually at commencement to a graduate "who has demonstrated exemplary service to both the university and the greater community without expectation of recognition" and is considered the university's highest student honor.

A pair of buildings bears the name of Brittain as well. The Dr. Marion Luther Brittain Sr. House, built in the Neoclassical Revival style and located at 1109 West Peachtree Street in Atlanta, was added to the National Register of Historic Places on September 23, 1993. The building served as Brittain's home from its construction in 1911 until Brittain and his family moved to the Georgia Tech president's house in 1922. It was later converted into office space and is privately owned. By 2018, the house had been demolished to make way for 1105 West Peachtree. The Marion L. Brittain Dining Hall, erected in 1928, is one of two dining facilities for students living in residence halls on the east side of Georgia Tech's campus.

== See also ==
- History of Georgia Tech
