= Industrial loan company =

FDIC-insured financial institutions with unique regulatory status

An industrial loan company (ILC) or industrial bank is a financial institution in the United States that lends money, and may be owned by non-financial institutions. They provide niche financial services nationwide. ILCs offer FDIC-insured deposits and are subject to FDIC and state regulator oversight. All FDIC-insured entities are subject to Sections 23A and 23B of the Federal Reserve Act, which limits bank transactions with affiliates, including the non-bank parent company. ILCs are permitted to have branches in multiple states (which is permitted by many states on a reciprocal basis). They are regulated and supervised by state charters and insured by the Federal Deposit Insurance Corporation. They are authorized to make consumer and commercial loans and accept federally insured deposits. Industrial banks are not allowed to accept demand deposits if they have total assets greater than $100 million. ILCs are exempted from the Bank Holding Company Act.

ILCs assist numerous charities and provide millions of dollars annually in grants, low interest loans, and service through the Community Reinvestment Act (CRA). Currently, only seven states offer an ILC bank charter. Most ILCs have been chartered by the Utah Department of Financial Institutions. Other states permitting ILCs include California, Colorado, Minnesota, Indiana, Hawaii, and Nevada.

| U.S. Industrial Banks | Total Assets as of December 31, 2025 (Figures in thousands USD) |
|---|---|
| Balboa Thrift and Loan Association | 409,500 |
| Beal Bank USA | 14,512,815 |
| BMW Bank of North America | 12,814,515 |
| Celtic Bank | 4,792,448 |
| Comenity Capital Bank | 13,626,906 |
| Community Commerce Bank | 411,498 |
| Eaglemark Savings | 743,751 |
| Finance Factors, Ltd | 687,876 |
| First Electronic Bank | 482,435 |
| Hatch Bank | 182,299 |
| Milestone Bank (formerly LCA Bank Corporation) | 374,567 |
| Medallion Bank | 2,620,589 |
| Merrick Bank | 9,251,625 |
| Minnesota First Credit and Savings | 28,940 |
| Nelnet Bank | 2,069,700 |
| Optum Bank, Inc | 20,824,000 |
| Pitney Bowes Bank, Inc. | 805,554 |
| Sallie Mae Bank | 29,734,290 |
| Square Financial Services | 1,694,247 |
| Toyota Financial Savings Bank | 15,431,880 |
| UBS Bank USA | 119,317,920 |
| WebBank | 2,940,956 |
| WEX Bank | 8,449,841 |

== Origins of the concept ==
In 1910, attorney Arthur J. Morris (1881–1973) opened the Fidelity Savings and Trust Company in Norfolk, Virginia, which made small loans to working people under a concept he called the "Morris Plan". Under this lending approach, would-be borrowers had to submit references from two people of like character and earning-power to prove the borrower's creditworthiness, and agreed to repay the loan through the purchase of Installment Thrift Certificates in weekly installments equal to the face value of the loan, less origination and investigative fees. Morris Plan Banks expanded to more than 100 locations in the United States.

Morris Plan banks pioneered the use of automotive financing (through arrangements between the Morris Plan Company of America, essentially a holding company for Morris Plan banks, and the Studebaker Corporation), and, through the subsidiary Morris Plan Insurance Society, credit life insurance (which provided for the loan to be repaid in case the borrower died during the term of the loan, with any residue going to the borrower's estate).
