= Manassas, Georgia =

- City
- Location in Tattnall County and the state of Georgia
- Coordinates: 32°9′51″N 82°1′17″W
- Country: United States
- State: Georgia
- County: Tattnall

Government
  - Type: Mayor-council government
  - Mayor: Tonya Edwards
  - Mayor Pro Tem: Shawn Edwards
  - Councilmember: Chris Busbie
  - Councilmember: Addie Edwards
  - Councilmember: Michael Godbee

Area
  - Total: 0.78 sq mi (2.01 km^{2})
  - Land: 0.77 sq mi (2.00 km^{2})
  - Water: 0.0039 sq mi (0.01 km^{2})
- Elevation: 210 ft (64 m)

Population (2020)
  - Total: 59
  - Density: 76.4/sq mi (29.48/km^{2})
- Time zone: UTC-5 (Eastern (EST))
  - Summer (DST): UTC-4 (EDT)
- ZIP code: 30438
- Area code: 912
- FIPS code: 13-49504
- GNIS feature ID: 0332310

Manassas is a city in Tattnall County, Georgia, United States. Per the 2020 census, the population was 59.

== History ==
The community was named after Manassas Foy, the son of a local citizen. The Georgia General Assembly incorporated Manassas as a city in 1920.

== Geography ==
Manassas is located at 32°9′51″N 82°1′17″W (32.164091, -82.021337).

According to the United States Census Bureau, the city has a total area of 0.8 square miles (2.1 km^{2}), all of it land.

== Demographics ==
Historical population
Census	Pop.	Note	%±
1930	197		—
1940	165		−16.2%
1950	128		−22.4%
1960	154		20.3%
1970	144		−6.5%
1980	116		−19.4%
1990	123		6.0%
2000	100		−18.7%
2010	94		−6.0%
2020	59		−37.2%
U.S. Decennial Census; 2010 2020

=== Racial and ethnic composition ===
Manassas city, Georgia – Racial and ethnic composition Note: the US Census treats Hispanic/Latino as an ethnic category. This table excludes Latinos from the racial categories and assigns them to a separate category. Hispanics/Latinos may be of any race.
Race / Ethnicity (NH = Non-Hispanic)	Pop 2000	Pop 2010	Pop 2020	% 2000	% 2010	% 2020
White alone (NH)	41	46	36	41.00%	48.94%	61.02%
Black or African American alone (NH)	59	36	23	59.00%	38.30%	38.98%
Native American or Alaska Native alone (NH)	0	0	0	0.00%	0.00%	0.00%
Asian alone (NH)	0	0	0	0.00%	0.00%	0.00%
Native Hawaiian or Pacific Islander alone (NH)	0	0	0	0.00%	0.00%	0.00%
Other race alone (NH)	0	0	0	0.00%	0.00%	0.00%
Mixed race or Multiracial (NH)	0	1	0	0.00%	1.06%	0.00%
Hispanic or Latino (any race)	0	11	0	0.00%	11.70%	0.00%
Total	100	94	59	100.00%	100.00%	100.00%

=== 2020 census ===
In 2020, its population was 59, down from 94 in 2010 and 100 in 2000.
