= Tucker & Howell =

Architectural firm in Atlanta, Georgia, US

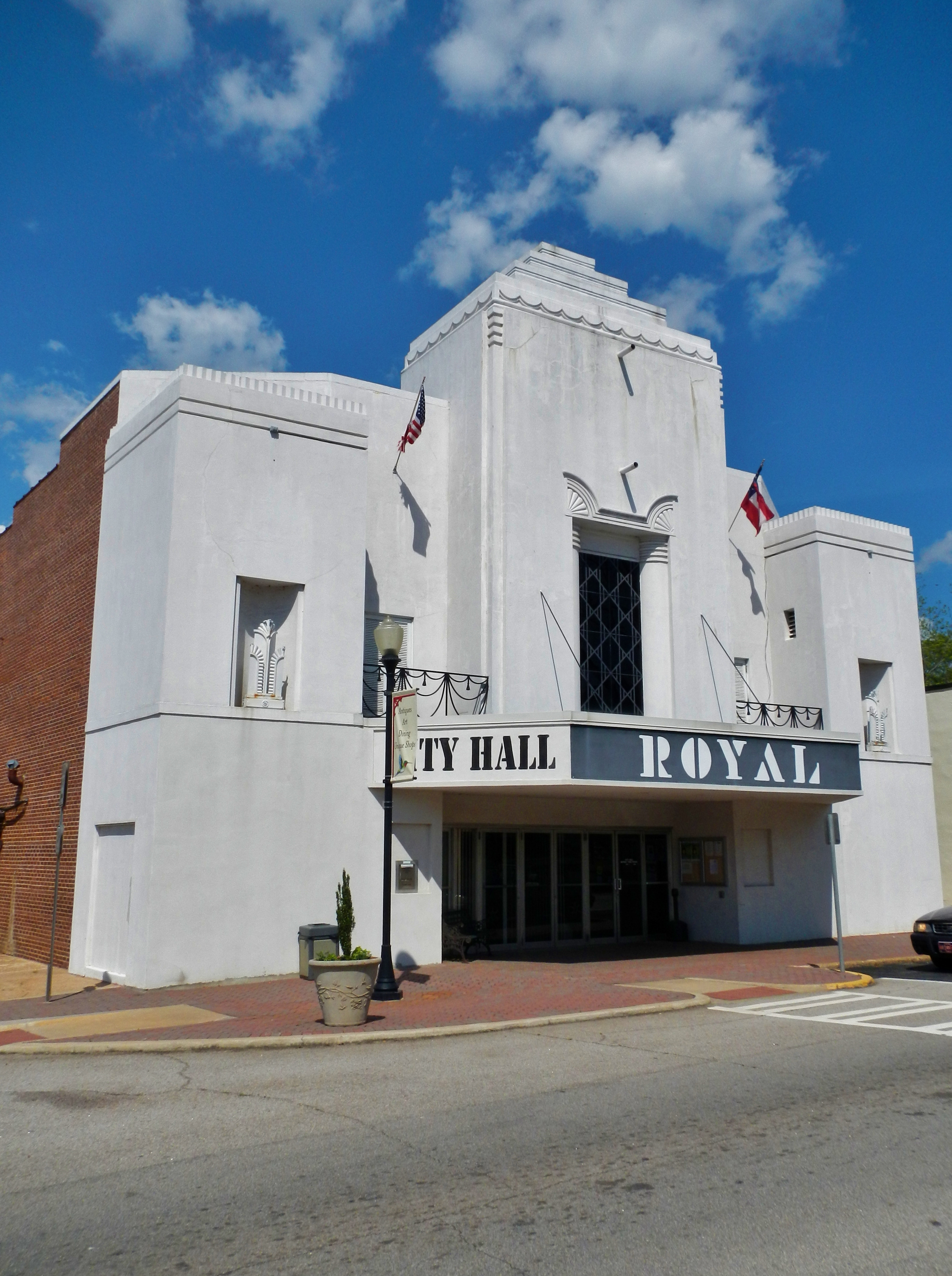
Royal Theater building, now Hogansville City Hall

Tucker & Howell was the Atlanta architectural firm of McKendree Tucker and Albert Howell. McKendree Tucker was born in 1896 in Bartow, Florida and was a pilot in World War I. In 1919 graduated from the Georgia Institute of Technology and went to work for the firm of Hentz, Reid & Adler. In the late 1920s Tucker formed a partnership with Albert Howell. Howell was born in 1904. His father was Atlanta Constitution editor Clark Howell. The team specialized in theater design. Tucker died in 1972 and Howell died in 1974. The firm partnered with sculptor Julian Hoke Harris on several projects.

== Works ==
- LaGrange theater (1930)
- Manchester theater (1935–37)
- Newnan theater (1937)
- Cedartown theaters (1941) (West Cinema?) theaters, one adorned with a relief sculpture by Julian Hoke Harris
- Rivoli theater (1936) in Rome, Georgia
- DeSota theater (1939) in Rome, Georgia
- Royal Theater (Hogansville, Georgia) (1937)
- News Reel Theater (1941) in Atlanta

The firm also designed Atlanta schools:

- Garden Hills Elementary (1938) neoclassical
- Morris School (1947)
- Brandon School (1947) streamlined moderne

They also designed:

- Georgia State Prison in Reidsville adorned by a Julian Harris frieze
- Morris Plan Bank Building, Atlanta (1936) demolished
- Zoo buildings (1950s)
- Commerce Building (1959) in Atlanta
- DeKalb County Federal Savings and Loan Building in Conyers (1963)
- Clark Howell residence (1938)
- Atlanta Constitution Building proposal (1941)
- Atlanta Water Bureau Construction and Maintenance Building (1947)
- Emma Hutchinson Elementary (1955–56)
