= Cobbtown, Georgia =

- City
- Location in Tattnall County and the state of Georgia
- Coordinates: 32°16′53″N 82°8′18″W
- Country: United States
- State: Georgia
- County: Tattnall

Government

Area
  - Total: 0.68 sq mi (1.76 km^{2})
  - Land: 0.67 sq mi (1.73 km^{2})
  - Water: 0.012 sq mi (0.03 km^{2})
- Elevation: 246 ft (75 m)

Population (2020)
  - Total: 341
  - Density: 509.9/sq mi (196.87/km^{2})
- Time zone: UTC-5 (Eastern (EST))
  - Summer (DST): UTC-4 (EDT)
- ZIP code: 30420
- Area code: 912
- FIPS code: 13-17272
- GNIS feature ID: 0355208

Cobbtown is a city in Tattnall County, Georgia, United States. The population was 311 at the 2000 census.

== History ==
A variant name was "Corsica". The Georgia General Assembly incorporated the place as the "Town of Cobbtown" in 1905.

== Geography ==
Cobbtown is located at 32°16′53″N 82°8′18″W (32.281376, -82.138288).

According to the United States Census Bureau, the city has a total area of 0.7 square miles (1.8 km^{2}), all of it land.

== Demographics ==
Historical population
Census	Pop.	Note	%±
1910	254		—
1920	325		28.0%
1930	295		−9.2%
1940	275		−6.8%
1950	288		4.7%
1960	280		−2.8%
1970	321		14.6%
1980	494		53.9%
1990	338		−31.6%
2000	311		−8.0%
2010	351		12.9%
2020	341		−2.8%
U.S. Decennial Census

As of the census of 2000, there were 311 people, 139 households, and 91 families residing in the city. The population density was 459.7 inhabitants per square mile (177.5/km^{2}). There were 178 housing units at an average density of 263.1 per square mile (101.6/km^{2}). The racial makeup of the city was 86.82% White, 9.65% African-American, 0.32% Native American, 3.22% from other races. Hispanic or Latino of any race were 3.54% of the population.

There were 139 households, out of which 23.7% had children under the age of 18 living with them, 48.2% were married couples living together, 13.7% had a female householder with no husband present, and 34.5% were non-families. 31.7% of all households were made up of individuals, and 20.1% had someone living alone who was 65 years of age or older. The average household size was 2.24 and the average family size was 2.78.

In the city, the population was spread out, with 21.2% under the age of 18, 7.7% from 18 to 24, 22.2% from 25 to 44, 22.5% from 45 to 64, and 26.4% who were 65 years of age or older. The median age was 44 years. For every 100 females, there were 92.0 males. For every 100 females age 18 and over, there were 76.3 males.

The median income for a household in the city was $23,571, and the median income for a family was $31,250. Males had a median income of $25,982 versus $16,875 for females. The per capita income for the city was $14,646. About 10.5% of families and 12.7% of the population were below the poverty line, including 10.0% of those under age 18 and 23.1% of those age 65 or over.
