= Boggs Academy =

Location
- 33.148551°N 82.1674527°W

Information
- Type: Parochial, segregated
- Religious affiliation: Presbyterian
- Established: January 1907
- Founder: John Lawrence Phelps
- Closed: 1984
- Website: www.boggs-academy.com

Boggs Academy was a Presbyterian school for African Americans founded in 1906 in Walker Settlement (Burke County), Georgia, United States, (3 miles [4.8 km] east of St. Clair), under the auspices of the Board of Missions for Freedmen, Presbyterian Church (USA). The school was closed in 1984.

== History ==
Boggs Academy was founded by the Reverend Dr. John Lawrence Phelps (1866–1937). The vision of Boggs Academy began during the summer of 1906, which was a year of extreme racial tension in the south. Amid this climate, Phelps accepted the challenge to establish a school built on Christian principles, which would educate African American youth. He set about building a church and school with the support of the Presbyterian church and the local community.

The initial two acres of land were donated by Morgan Walker, donations were collected, and a church was erected (Morgan Groove Presbyterian Church). By December of that year, the church doors were opened, and by January 1907, an independent school was opened in the church. Five children were enrolled in Boggs Academy when it opened. The school was named after Virginia P. Boggs (Corresponding Secretary of the Presbyterian Board of Missions For Freedmen) as a tribute for her faithful zeal, commitment to the school's success and her support and friendship to Reverend Phelps while he was a student at Biddle University (now known as Johnson C. Smith University). In 1930, the original church was destroyed by fire and another building was erected through the generosity of the Blackburn family of Pittsburgh, Pennsylvania; the new chapel, which is still standing on the Boggs campus, was named the John I. Blackburn Presbyterian Church.

Numerous private African American schools were established after the Civil War because there were no public schools for African American students in the South. Boggs began primarily to serve the local African American community. After the public school opened in Burke County in the 1950s in response to integration laws, Boggs increasingly functioned as a preparatory school for the African American middle class from Georgia and other states. Boggs Academy had also negotiated a settlement that allowed both white and black people to serve on its faculty.

Over the years the Boggs student body and campus continued to grow and flourish with additional acreage, buildings and capabilities.

== Student life ==
Students began their day with compulsory chapel and attended classes until 4 PM. They had to be in dormitories by 9:30 PM and in bed by 10 PM.
