= Reidsville, Georgia =

- City
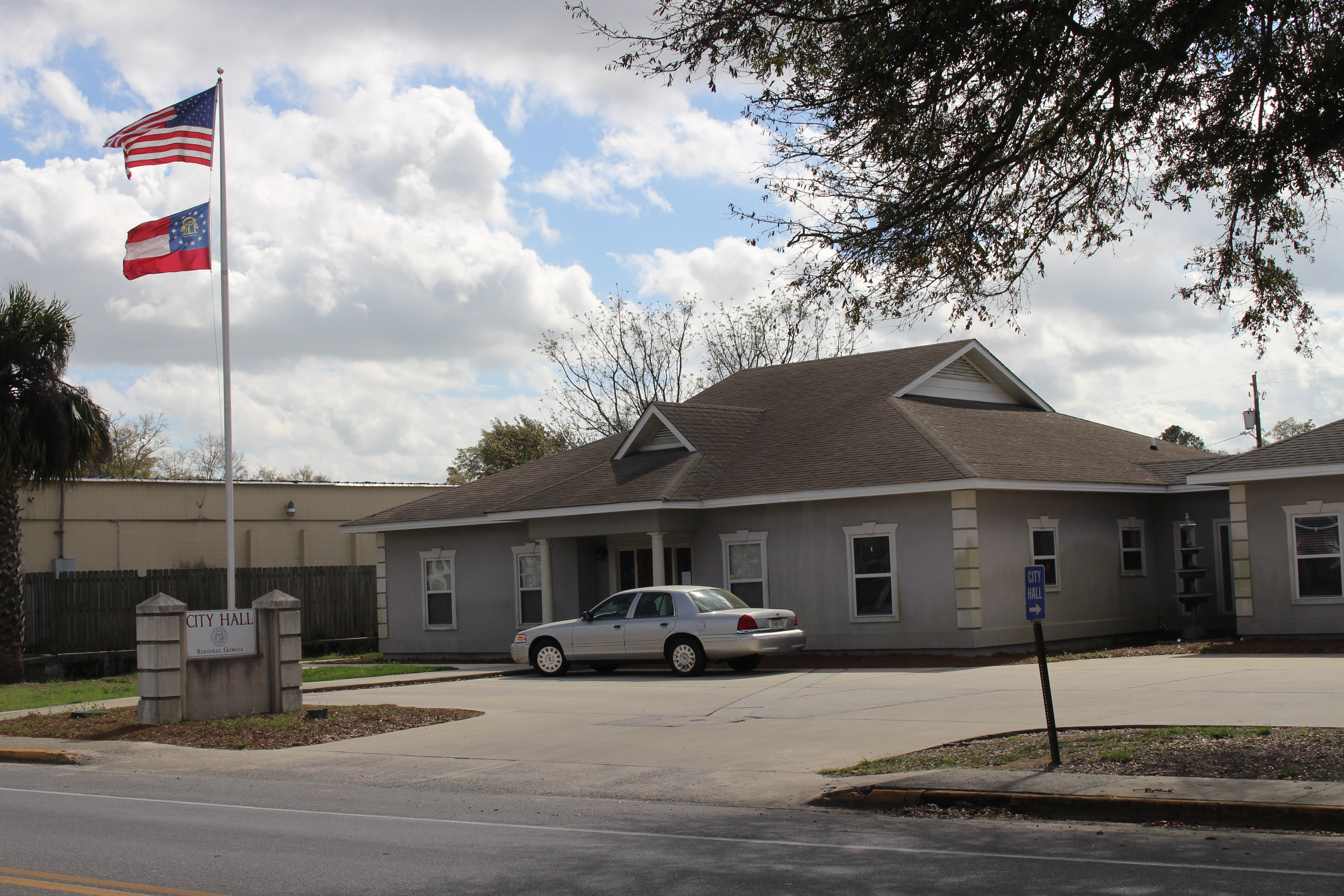
- Reidsville City Hall

- Location in Tattnall County and the state of Georgia
- Coordinates: 32°5′2″N 82°7′15″W
- Country: United States
- State: Georgia
- County: Tattnall

Area
  - Total: 7.70 sq mi (19.93 km^{2})
  - Land: 7.57 sq mi (19.61 km^{2})
  - Water: 0.12 sq mi (0.32 km^{2})
- Elevation: 210 ft (64 m)

Population (2020)
  - Total: 2,515
  - Density: 332.2/sq mi (128.25/km^{2})
- Time zone: UTC-5 (Eastern (EST))
  - Summer (DST): UTC-4 (EDT)
- ZIP codes: 30453, 30499
- Area code: 912
- FIPS code: 13-64512
- GNIS feature ID: 0321516
- Website: cityofreidsvillega.com

Reidsville is a city in, and county seat of, Tattnall County, Georgia. The population was 2,515 in 2020. The Georgia State Prison is near Reidsville.

== History ==
Reidsville was founded in about 1828 and was designated county seat of Tattnall County in 1832 by the Georgia General Assembly. It was incorporated as a town in 1838 and as a city in 1905. The city was named after Robert R. Reid, territorial governor of Florida.

Reidsville is home to the Nelson Hotel Bed & Breakfast.

During World War II, Reidsville was the home to at least one, though some reports suggest two, prisoner of war camps for captured Nazi personnel. The prison camp's location is believed to have stood near the current location of a gas station/self-storage company, near the fringes of the city. Archaeological research into the area has turned up a number of German artifacts, though with the development and addition of a number of houses, it is not clear if this was the location of the camp, or one of the many onion fields in which the prisoners worked.

== Geography ==
Reidsville is located at 32°5′2″N 82°7′15″W (32.083970, -82.120697).

According to the United States Census Bureau, the city has a total area of 7.7 square miles (20 km^{2}), of which 7.7 square miles (20 km^{2}) are land and 0.04-square-mile (0.10 km^{2}) (0.39%) is water.

== Demographics ==
Historical population
Census	Pop.	Note	%±
1880	106		—
1900	257		—
1910	454		76.7%
1920	553		21.8%
1930	631		14.1%
1940	805		27.6%
1950	1,266		57.3%
1960	1,229		−2.9%
1970	1,806		46.9%
1980	2,296		27.1%
1990	2,469		7.5%
2000	2,235		−9.5%
2010	4,944		121.2%
2020	2,515		−49.1%
U.S. Decennial Census

=== Racial and ethnic composition ===
Reidsville city, Georgia – Racial and ethnic composition Note: the US Census treats Hispanic/Latino as an ethnic category. This table excludes Latinos from the racial categories and assigns them to a separate category. Hispanics/Latinos may be of any race.
Race / Ethnicity (NH = Non-Hispanic)	Pop 2000	Pop 2010	Pop 2020	% 2000	% 2010	% 2020
White alone (NH)	1,264	2,295	1,184	56.55%	46.42%	47.08%
Black or African American alone (NH)	750	2,336	1,022	33.56%	47.25%	40.64%
Native American or Alaska Native alone (NH)	4	5	4	0.18%	0.10%	0.16%
Asian alone (NH)	10	27	36	0.45%	0.55%	1.43%
Native Hawaiian or Pacific Islander alone (NH)	0	5	2	0.00%	0.10%	0.08%
Other race alone (NH)	0	0	5	0.00%	0.00%	0.20%
Mixed race or Multiracial (NH)	20	19	75	0.89%	0.38%	2.98%
Hispanic or Latino (any race)	187	257	187	8.37%	5.20%	7.44%
Total	2,235	4,944	2,515	100.00%	100.00%	100.00%

=== 2020 census ===
As of the 2020 census, Reidsville had a population of 2,515 a sharp decline from 2010 after the Georgia State Prison was closed. The median age was 39.3 years. 28.1% of residents were under the age of 18 and 19.3% of residents were 65 years of age or older. For every 100 females there were 79.1 males, and for every 100 females age 18 and over there were 72.6 males age 18 and over.

0.0% of residents lived in urban areas, while 100.0% lived in rural areas.

There were 995 households in Reidsville, of which 694 were families. Of all households, 36.2% had children under the age of 18 living in them. 30.5% were married-couple households, 18.9% were households with a male householder and no spouse or partner present, and 43.9% were households with a female householder and no spouse or partner present. About 33.5% of all households were made up of individuals, and 15.7% had someone living alone who was 65 years of age or older.

There were 1,170 housing units, of which 15.0% were vacant. The homeowner vacancy rate was 6.8% and the rental vacancy rate was 9.9%.

== Government and infrastructure ==
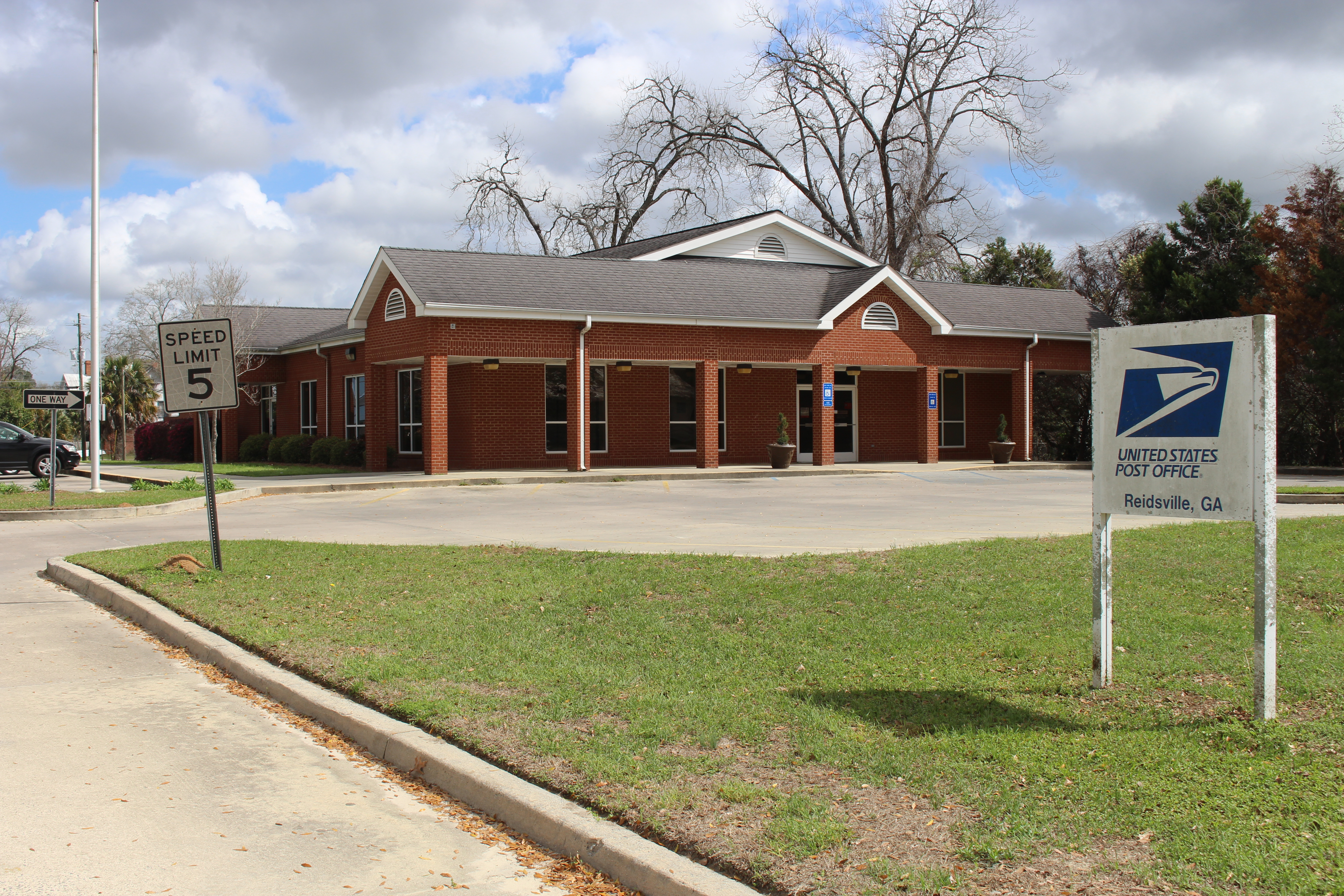
Reidsville Post Office

The United States Postal Service operates the Reidsville Post Office.

The Georgia Department of Corrections operated the Georgia State Prison in unincorporated Tattnall County, near Reidsville. The prison closed in 2022.

== Education ==
=== Tattnall County School District ===
The Tattnall County School District holds pre-school to grade twelve, and consists of three elementary schools, two middle schools, and a high school. The district has 201 full-time teachers and over 3,305 students.

Schools in Reidsville:

- Reidsville Elementary School
- North Tattnall Middle School

Nearby Tattnall County High School serves the city.

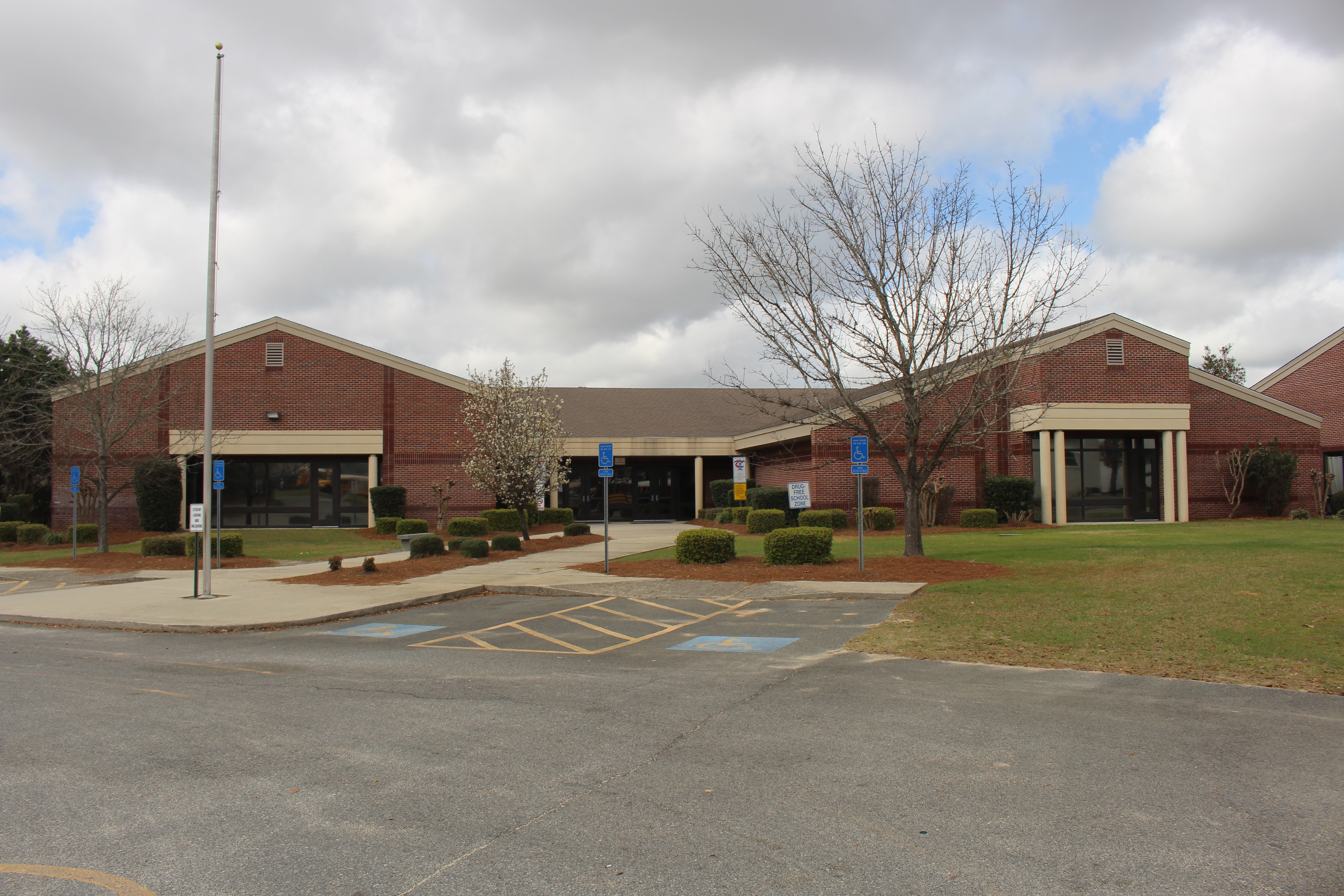
North Tattnall Middle School

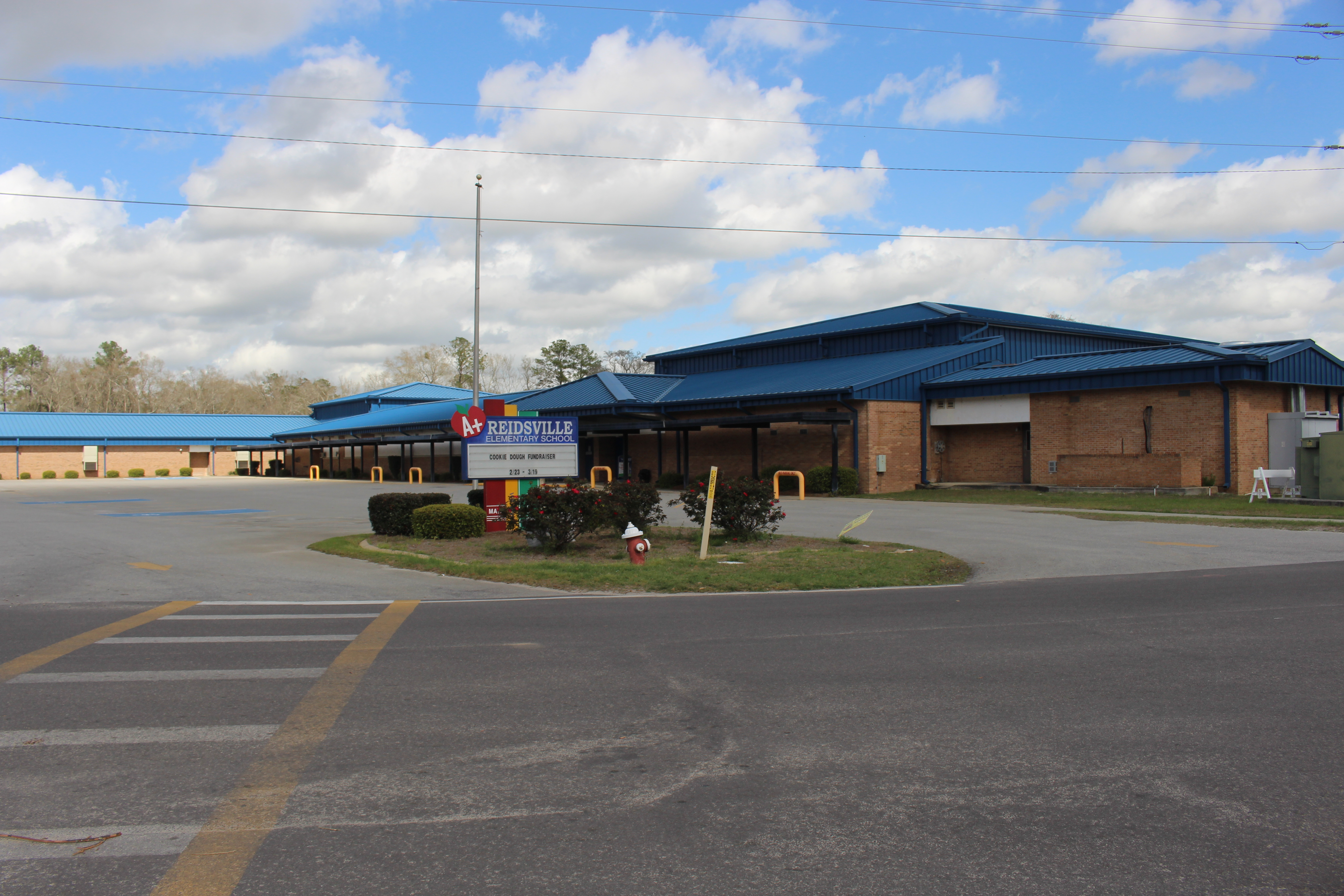
Reidsville Elementary School

== Notable people ==
- James Kicklighter - film director, attended Reidsville Elementary School and Reidsville Middle School, before graduating from Tattnall County High School.
- Lena Baker - only woman to be executed by the electric chair in Georgia was executed in Georgia State Prison, Reidsville
- Linton McGee Collins - jurist
- Emma Gresham - was an American teacher and politician who was mayor of Keysville, Georgia.
- Jack Hill (politician) - was an American politician. A member of the Republican Party, he represented Georgia's 4th District in the Georgia State Senate.
