= Tattnall County, Georgia =

County in Georgia, United States

- County
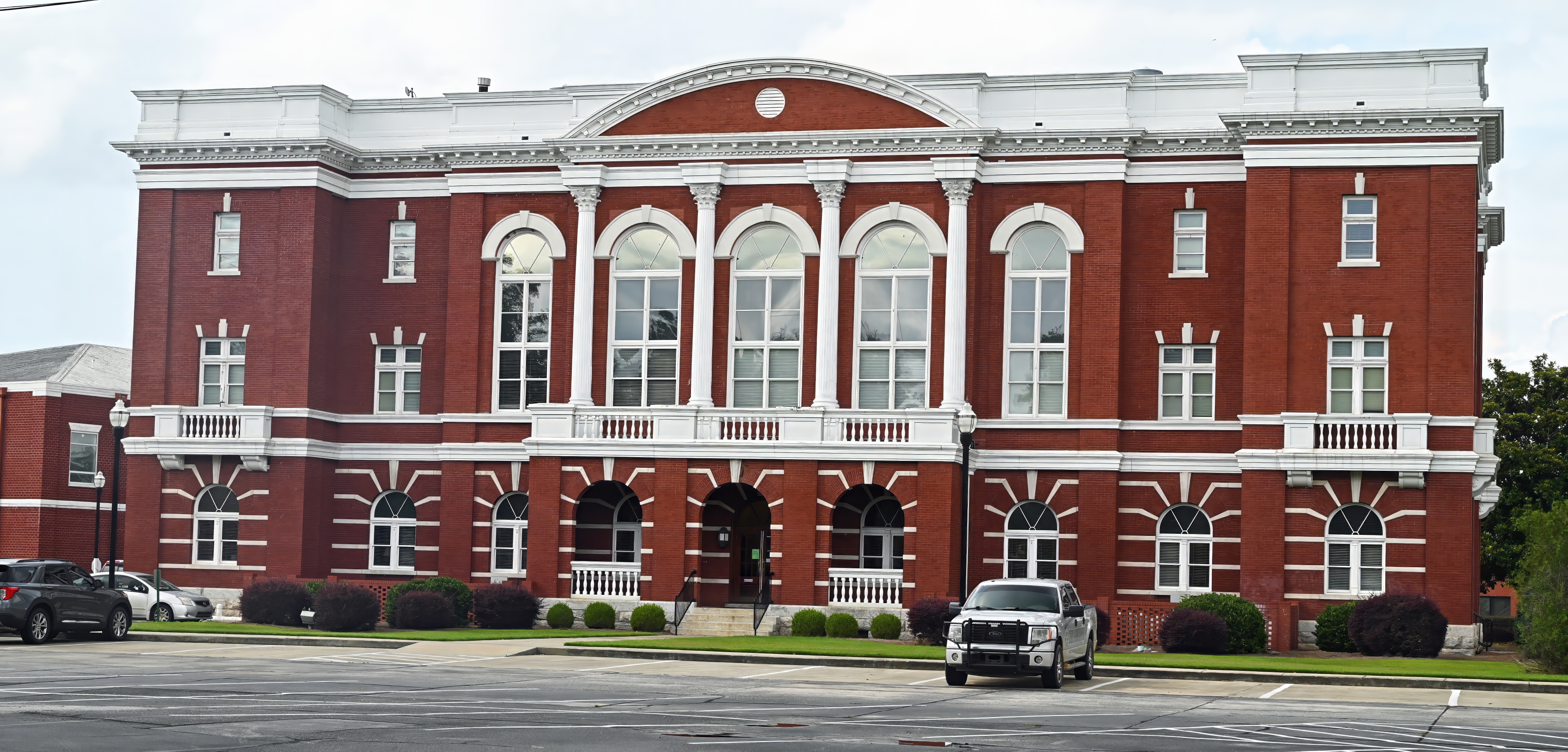
- Tattnall County Courthouse

- Location within the U.S. state of Georgia
- Coordinates: 32°02′N 82°04′W
- Country: United States
- State: Georgia
- Founded: December 5, 1801; 224 years ago
- Named for: Josiah Tattnall
- Seat: Reidsville
- Largest city: Glennville

Area
  - Total: 488 sq mi (1,260 km^{2})
  - Land: 479 sq mi (1,240 km^{2})
  - Water: 8.9 sq mi (23 km^{2}) 1.8%

Population (2020)
  - Total: 22,842
  - Estimate (2025): 24,376 ▲
  - Density: 48/sq mi (19/km^{2})
- Time zone: UTC−5 (Eastern)
  - Summer (DST): UTC−4 (EDT)
- Congressional district: 12th
- Website: www.tattnallcountyga.com

Tattnall County is a county located in the southeast portion of the U.S. state of Georgia, located within the Magnolia Midlands, a part of the Historic South region. As of the 2020 census, the population was 22,842. The county seat is Reidsville. Tattnall County was created on December 5, 1801, from part of Montgomery County, Georgia by the Georgia General Assembly.

The county is named after Josiah Tattnall (1762–1803), a planter, soldier and politician.

== Geography ==
According to the U.S. Census Bureau, the county has a total area of 488 square miles (1,260 km^{2}), of which 479 square miles (1,240 km^{2}) is land and 8.9 square miles (23 km^{2}) (1.8%) is water.

Most of the western portion of Tattnall County, defined by a line running from Cobbtown south to Collins, then east to a point halfway to Bellville, and then south and southwest to the middle of the county's southern border, is located in the Ohoopee River sub-basin of the Altamaha River basin. The northeastern portion of the county, from Cobbtown to east of Reidsville, is located in the Canoochee River sub-basin of the Ogeechee River basin. The southeastern and southwestern parts of Tattnall County are located in the Altamaha River sub-basin of the larger river basin by the same name.

=== Major highways ===
- US 25 / US 301
- US 280 / SR 30
- SR 23
- SR 56
- SR 57
- SR 73
- SR 121
- SR 129
- SR 144
- SR 147
- SR 152
- SR 169
- SR 178
- SR 292

=== Adjacent counties ===
- Candler County - north
- Evans County - northeast
- Liberty County - east
- Long County - southeast
- Wayne County - south
- Appling County - southwest
- Toombs County - west
- Emanuel County - northwest

== Communities ==
=== Cities ===
- Cobbtown
- Collins
- Glennville (largest city)
- Manassas
- Reidsville (county seat)

=== Census-designated place ===
- Mendes

== Demographics ==
Historical population
| Census | Pop. | Note | %± |
|---|---|---|---|
| 1810 | 2,206 | | — |
| 1820 | 2,644 | | 19.9% |
| 1830 | 2,040 | | −22.8% |
| 1840 | 2,724 | | 33.5% |
| 1850 | 3,227 | | 18.5% |
| 1860 | 4,352 | | 34.9% |
| 1870 | 4,860 | | 11.7% |
| 1880 | 6,988 | | 43.8% |
| 1890 | 10,253 | | 46.7% |
| 1900 | 20,419 | | 99.2% |
| 1910 | 18,569 | | −9.1% |
| 1920 | 14,502 | | −21.9% |
| 1930 | 15,411 | | 6.3% |
| 1940 | 16,243 | | 5.4% |
| 1950 | 15,939 | | −1.9% |
| 1960 | 15,837 | | −0.6% |
| 1970 | 16,557 | | 4.5% |
| 1980 | 18,134 | | 9.5% |
| 1990 | 17,722 | | −2.3% |
| 2000 | 22,305 | | 25.9% |
| 2010 | 25,520 | | 14.4% |
| 2020 | 22,842 | | −10.5% |
| 2025 (est.) | 24,376 | ▲ | 6.7% |
U.S. Decennial Census; 1790-1880 1890-1910; 1920-1930 1930-1940; 1940-1950 1960-1980; 1980-2000 2010

=== Racial and ethnic composition ===
Tattnall County, Georgia – Racial and ethnic composition Note: the US Census treats Hispanic/Latino as an ethnic category. This table excludes Latinos from the racial categories and assigns them to a separate category. Hispanics/Latinos may be of any race.
| Race / Ethnicity (NH = Non-Hispanic) | Pop 1980 | Pop 1990 | Pop 2000 | Pop 2010 | Pop 2020 | % 1980 | % 1990 | % 2000 | % 2010 | % 2020 |
|---|---|---|---|---|---|---|---|---|---|---|
| White alone (NH) | 12,719 | 11,950 | 13,218 | 15,196 | 13,825 | 70.14% | 67.43% | 59.26% | 59.55% | 60.52% |
| Black or African American alone (NH) | 5,208 | 5,155 | 6,988 | 7,424 | 5,961 | 28.72% | 29.09% | 31.33% | 29.09% | 26.10% |
| Native American or Alaska Native alone (NH) | 10 | 23 | 24 | 54 | 36 | 0.06% | 0.13% | 0.11% | 0.21% | 0.16% |
| Asian alone (NH) | 55 | 45 | 64 | 99 | 127 | 0.30% | 0.25% | 0.29% | 0.39% | 0.56% |
| Native Hawaiian or Pacific Islander alone (NH) | x | x | 4 | 11 | 6 | x | x | 0.02% | 0.04% | 0.03% |
| Other race alone (NH) | 6 | 2 | 8 | 16 | 46 | 0.03% | 0.01% | 0.04% | 0.06% | 0.20% |
| Mixed race or Multiracial (NH) | x | x | 116 | 218 | 538 | x | x | 0.52% | 0.85% | 2.36% |
| Hispanic or Latino (any race) | 136 | 547 | 1,883 | 2,502 | 2,303 | 0.75% | 3.09% | 8.44% | 9.80% | 10.08% |
| Total | 18,134 | 17,722 | 22,305 | 25,520 | 22,842 | 100.00% | 100.00% | 100.00% | 100.00% | 100.00% |

=== 2020 census ===
As of the 2020 census, the county had a population of 22,842, 7,829 households, and 5,875 families residing in the county.

The median age was 38.4 years. 22.7% of residents were under the age of 18 and 15.4% of residents were 65 years of age or older. For every 100 females there were 119.2 males, and for every 100 females age 18 and over there were 124.9 males age 18 and over. 0.0% of residents lived in urban areas, while 100.0% lived in rural areas.

The racial makeup of the county was 62.5% White, 26.3% Black or African American, 0.4% American Indian and Alaska Native, 0.6% Asian, 0.0% Native Hawaiian and Pacific Islander, 5.6% from some other race, and 4.6% from two or more races. Hispanic or Latino residents of any race comprised 10.1% of the population.

Of the 7,829 households in the county, 33.7% had children under the age of 18 living with them and 30.5% had a female householder with no spouse or partner present. About 28.4% of all households were made up of individuals and 12.9% had someone living alone who was 65 years of age or older.

There were 9,298 housing units, of which 15.8% were vacant. Among occupied housing units, 64.3% were owner-occupied and 35.7% were renter-occupied. The homeowner vacancy rate was 2.1% and the rental vacancy rate was 9.5%.

== Government and infrastructure ==
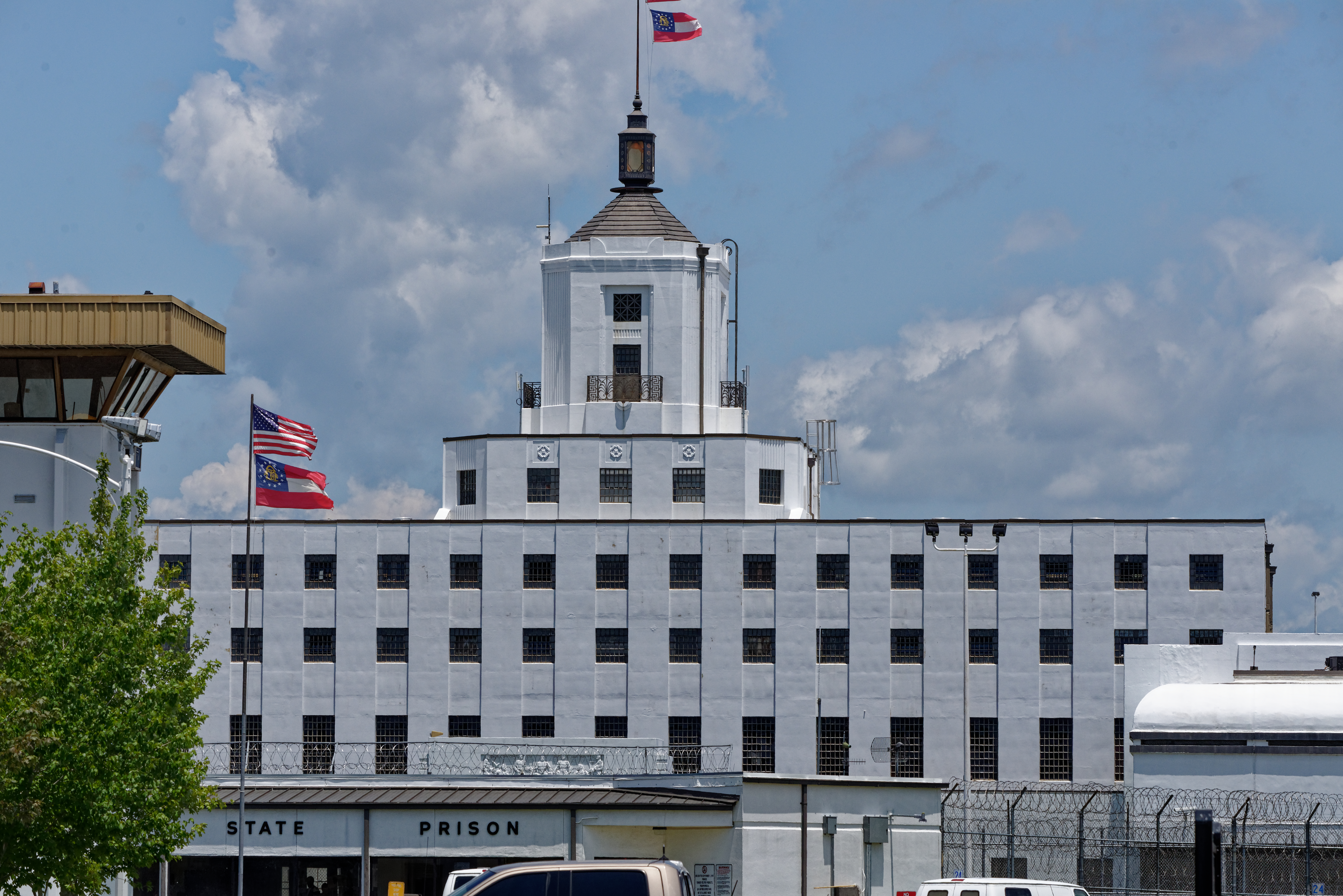
Georgia State Prison

The Georgia Department of Corrections operates the Rogers State Prison, and formerly the Georgia State Prison in unincorporated Tattnall County, near Reidsville. As of 2020, according to the Georgia State Prison Fact Sheet, the facility occupies 9,800 acres of land inside Tattnall County and provides 162 staff housing units on the reservation. The prison cemetery has 971 burials which are inmates who died while serving time from 1937 to present.

Another large government parcel of land is the 10,000 acre Big Hammock Wildlife Management Preserve in the southwest section of the county. The entrance is 12 miles south of Glennville on Hwy 144 at the Ohoopee River Bridge. This is controlled by the GA Department of Natural Resources under the Wildlife Resources Division. It has a shooting range and 2 boat ramps along the river which are north of the merger with the Altamaha River which forms the southern border of the county. Permits are issued for seasonal hunting of deer, turkey, and small game.

Another large government land parcel is on the eastern side of Tattnall County along the border with Evans, Liberty, and Long Counties. This 6000+ acres forms the western side of the Fort Stewart Army Reservation which is based in Hinesville, GA. Originally this was farmland purchased by the Army during and after World War II. It has since been turned into forest land with no development. The current Ft. Stewart Land Use Development plan excludes any of this property in their 25-year future planning approved by the Department of Defense. This land mass can be viewed on Google Maps with additional info from the website for the Ft. Stewart Joint Land Use Study.

=== Politics ===
As of the 2020s, Tattnall County is a Republican stronghold, voting 77% for Donald Trump in 2024. For elections to the United States House of Representatives, Tattnall County is part of Georgia's 12th congressional district, currently represented by Rick Allen. For elections to the Georgia State Senate, Tattnall County is part of District 19. For elections to the Georgia House of Representatives, Tattnall County is divided between districts 156 and 157.

United States presidential election results for Tattnall County, Georgia
| Year | Republican | | Democratic | | Third party(ies) | |
| Year | No. | % | No. | % | No. | % |
|---|---|---|---|---|---|---|
| 1912 | 18 | 2.11% | 592 | 69.40% | 243 | 28.49% |
| 1916 | 49 | 5.95% | 574 | 69.74% | 200 | 24.30% |
| 1920 | 301 | 40.24% | 447 | 59.76% | 0 | 0.00% |
| 1924 | 66 | 5.02% | 1,100 | 83.65% | 149 | 11.33% |
| 1928 | 791 | 63.23% | 460 | 36.77% | 0 | 0.00% |
| 1932 | 37 | 1.70% | 2,133 | 98.02% | 6 | 0.28% |
| 1936 | 214 | 16.82% | 1,047 | 82.31% | 11 | 0.86% |
| 1940 | 421 | 25.15% | 1,246 | 74.43% | 7 | 0.42% |
| 1944 | 494 | 28.91% | 1,215 | 71.09% | 0 | 0.00% |
| 1948 | 216 | 11.59% | 1,071 | 57.46% | 577 | 30.95% |
| 1952 | 1,114 | 31.41% | 2,433 | 68.59% | 0 | 0.00% |
| 1956 | 440 | 18.96% | 1,881 | 81.04% | 0 | 0.00% |
| 1960 | 869 | 31.29% | 1,908 | 68.71% | 0 | 0.00% |
| 1964 | 3,264 | 66.45% | 1,648 | 33.55% | 0 | 0.00% |
| 1968 | 852 | 16.34% | 957 | 18.35% | 3,405 | 65.30% |
| 1972 | 2,892 | 85.46% | 492 | 14.54% | 0 | 0.00% |
| 1976 | 1,326 | 27.16% | 3,556 | 72.84% | 0 | 0.00% |
| 1980 | 2,082 | 41.62% | 2,864 | 57.26% | 56 | 1.12% |
| 1984 | 3,641 | 65.08% | 1,954 | 34.92% | 0 | 0.00% |
| 1988 | 3,172 | 65.03% | 1,694 | 34.73% | 12 | 0.25% |
| 1992 | 2,566 | 43.18% | 2,360 | 39.72% | 1,016 | 17.10% |
| 1996 | 2,518 | 46.23% | 2,369 | 43.49% | 560 | 10.28% |
| 2000 | 3,597 | 64.12% | 1,963 | 34.99% | 50 | 0.89% |
| 2004 | 4,657 | 71.93% | 1,787 | 27.60% | 30 | 0.46% |
| 2008 | 4,730 | 70.32% | 1,932 | 28.72% | 64 | 0.95% |
| 2012 | 4,706 | 70.48% | 1,897 | 28.41% | 74 | 1.11% |
| 2016 | 5,096 | 73.54% | 1,681 | 24.26% | 153 | 2.21% |
| 2020 | 6,054 | 73.95% | 2,062 | 25.19% | 71 | 0.87% |
| 2024 | 6,515 | 76.54% | 1,967 | 23.11% | 30 | 0.35% |

United States Senate election results for Tattnall County, Georgia2
| Year | Republican | | Democratic | | Third party(ies) | |
| Year | No. | % | No. | % | No. | % |
|---|---|---|---|---|---|---|
| 2020 | 5,954 | 73.59% | 1,978 | 24.45% | 159 | 1.97% |
| 2020 | 5,344 | 74.06% | 1,872 | 25.94% | 0 | 0.00% |

United States Senate election results for Tattnall County, Georgia3
| Year | Republican | | Democratic | | Third party(ies) | |
| Year | No. | % | No. | % | No. | % |
|---|---|---|---|---|---|---|
| 2020 | 3,047 | 38.39% | 1,200 | 15.12% | 3,690 | 46.49% |
| 2020 | 6,053 | 74.60% | 2,061 | 25.40% | 0 | 0.00% |
| 2022 | 4,866 | 74.86% | 1,525 | 23.46% | 109 | 1.68% |
| 2022 | 4,562 | 76.01% | 1,440 | 23.99% | 0 | 0.00% |

Georgia Gubernatorial election results for Tattnall County
| Year | Republican | | Democratic | | Third party(ies) | |
| Year | No. | % | No. | % | No. | % |
|---|---|---|---|---|---|---|
| 2022 | 5,123 | 78.49% | 1,359 | 20.82% | 45 | 0.69% |

== Education ==
Tattnall County School District serves as the designated K-12 school district, except parts in Fort Stewart. Fort Stewart has the Department of Defense Education Activity (DoDEA) as its local school district, for the elementary level. Students at the secondary level on Fort Stewart attend public schools operated by county school districts.

== See also ==
- National Register of Historic Places listings in Tattnall County, Georgia
- List of counties in Georgia
