= National Register of Historic Places listings in Candler County, Georgia =

This is a list of properties and districts in Candler County, Georgia that are listed on the National Register of Historic Places (NRHP).

This National Park Service list is complete through NPS recent listings posted March 21, 2025.

== Current listings ==
	Name on the Register	Image	Date listed	Location	City or town	Description
1	Candler County Courthouse	Candler County Courthouse	September 18, 1980 (#80000984)	Courthouse Sq. 32°23′48″N 82°03′45″W	Metter	Built in 1921
2	Candler County Jail	Candler County Jail	November 7, 2002 (#02001291)	349 N. Rountree St. 32°24′04″N 82°03′40″W	Metter	Built in 1916
3	Metter Downtown Historic District	Metter Downtown Historic District	August 24, 2011 (#11000578)	Centered on Broad & Roundtree Sts. 32°23′50″N 82°03′41″W	Metter	website^{[usurped]}
4	Metter High School	Metter High School	August 9, 2002 (#02000840)	Junction of College St. and Vertia St. 32°23′44″N 82°03′50″W	Metter	Built in 1910, it now houses the Candler County Historical Society Museum
5	South Metter Residential Historic District	South Metter Residential Historic District	March 15, 1988 (#87001429)	Roughly bounded by Vertia, S. Kennedy, Hiawatha, and S. Leroy Streets; 32°23′33″N 82°03′41″W	Metter	Includes 77 contributing buildings mostly built from 1899 to 1940
