= Candler County School District =

School district in Georgia (U.S. state)

Address
- 210 S College St. Metter, Georgia, 30439-4510; United States
- Coordinates: 32.395715°N 82.06469°W

District information
- Grades: Pre-school - 12
- Superintendent: Dr. Tom Bigwood

Students and staff
- Enrollment: 1,918
- Faculty: 117

Other information
- Accreditation: Southern Association of Colleges and Schools; Georgia Accrediting Commission
- Fax: (912) 685-2076
- Website: www.metter.org

The Candler County School District is a public school district in Candler County, Georgia, United States, based in Metter, Georgia. It serves the communities of Metter and Pulaski, Georgia.

== Schools ==
The Candler County School District has two elementary schools, one middle school, and one high school.

=== Elementary schools ===
- Metter Elementary School
- Metter Intermediate School

=== Middle school ===
- Metter Middle School

=== High school ===
- Metter High School
