= Metter Downtown Historic District =

Historic district in Georgia, United States

- U.S. National Register of Historic Places
- U.S. Historic district
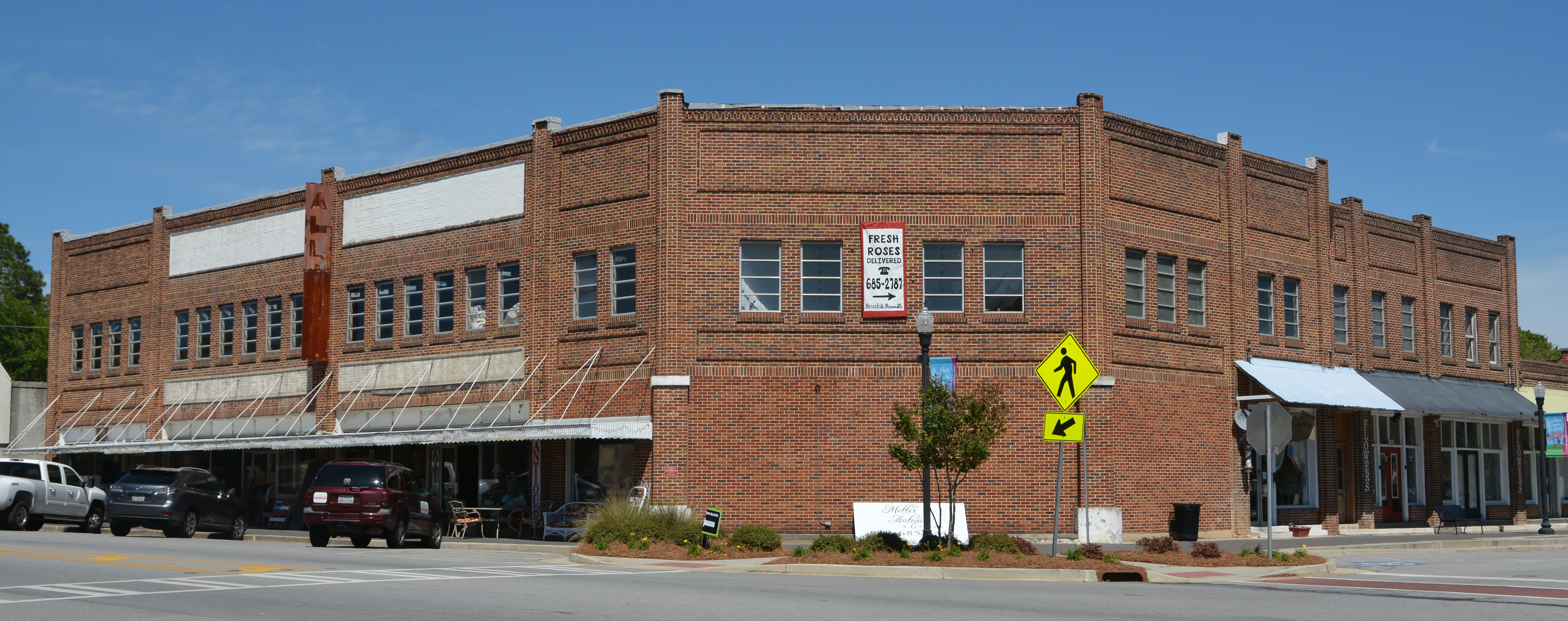
- The Allied Building

- Location within Georgia Location within the United States
- Location: Centered on Broad & Roundtree Sts., Metter, Georgia
- Coordinates: 32.39732°N 82.06147°W
- Built: 1901, 1914, 1921
- Architect: James J. Baldwin, others
- Architectural style: Early Commercial, Modern Movement
- NRHP reference No.: 11000578
- Added to NRHP: August 24, 2011

The Metter Downtown Historic District is a historic district in Metter, Georgia which was listed on the National Register of Historic Places in 2011.

It includes:

- Candler County Courthouse (1921), separately NRHP-listed
- U. S. Post Office (1960)
- Metter Bank Company (1904), later a BB&T, now office of an LLP, with a marble façade
- Allied Building (1930)
- Broad Street Market (c.1900)
- Masonic Building (1916)
- Dixie Theater (1930s)
- Metter Depot (1902, 1914). Wood frame depot with board-and-batten siding, moved to current location in 1950s.
- two churches
