= Candler County Jail =

- U.S. National Register of Historic Places
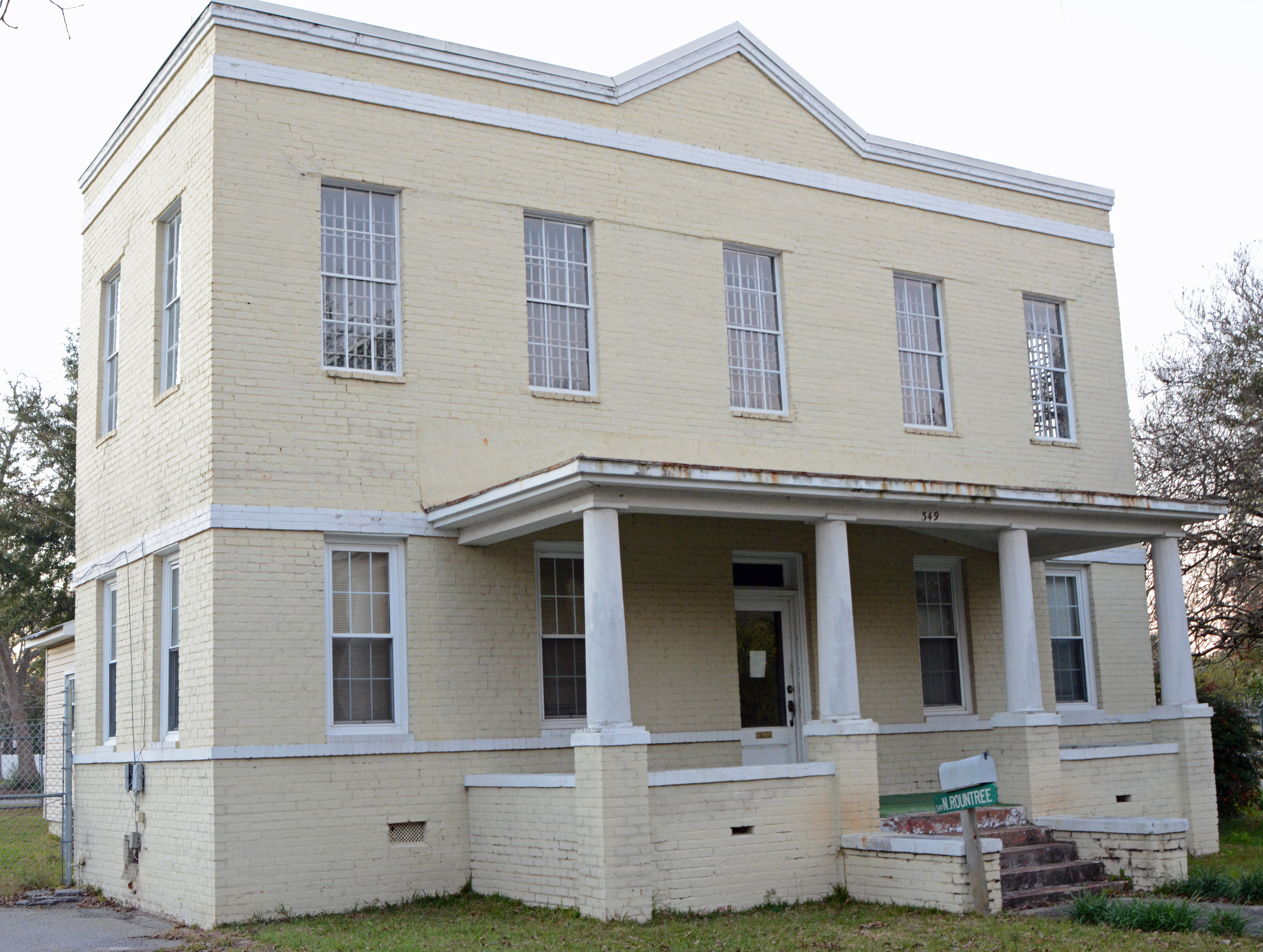
- The jail in 2015

- Location within Georgia Location within the United States
- Location: 349 N. Rountree St., Metter, Georgia
- Coordinates: 32.40118°N 82.06105°W
- Area: less than one acre
- Built: 1916
- Built by: Fowler and Sage Construction, Pauley Jail Equipment Co.
- Architectural style: Colonial Revival
- NRHP reference No.: 02001291
- Added to NRHP: November 7, 2002

Candler County Jail is a historic jail in Metter in Candler County, Georgia. The two-story brick building was constructed in 1916 as a jail and home for the sheriff. It is now used to house county service and emergency management agency operations. It was added to the National Register of Historic Places on November 7, 2002. It is located at 349 North Rountree Street.

== See also ==
- National Register of Historic Places listings in Candler County, Georgia
