= National Register of Historic Places listings in Evans County, Georgia =

This is a list of properties and districts in Evans County, Georgia that are listed on the National Register of Historic Places (NRHP).

This National Park Service list is complete through NPS recent listings posted March 21, 2025.

== Current listings ==
	Name on the Register	Image	Date listed	Location	City or town	Description
1	Dr. James W. Daniel House	Dr. James W. Daniel House	April 7, 1983 (#83000192)	102 N. Newton St. 32°09′48″N 81°54′19″W	Claxton	
2	George W. DeLoach House	George W. DeLoach House	June 28, 1982 (#82002412)	S. Railroad Ave., and Strickland St. 32°09′19″N 81°56′00″W	Hagan	
3	Evans County Courthouse	Evans County Courthouse	September 18, 1980 (#80001018)	Courthouse Sq. 32°09′42″N 81°54′27″W	Claxton	
4	Mitchell J. Green Plantation	Mitchell J. Green Plantation	April 9, 1980 (#80001019)	NE of Claxton off U.S. 301 and GA 169; 32°14′54″N 81°52′17″W	Claxton	
