= Barrow County Courthouse =

- U.S. National Register of Historic Places
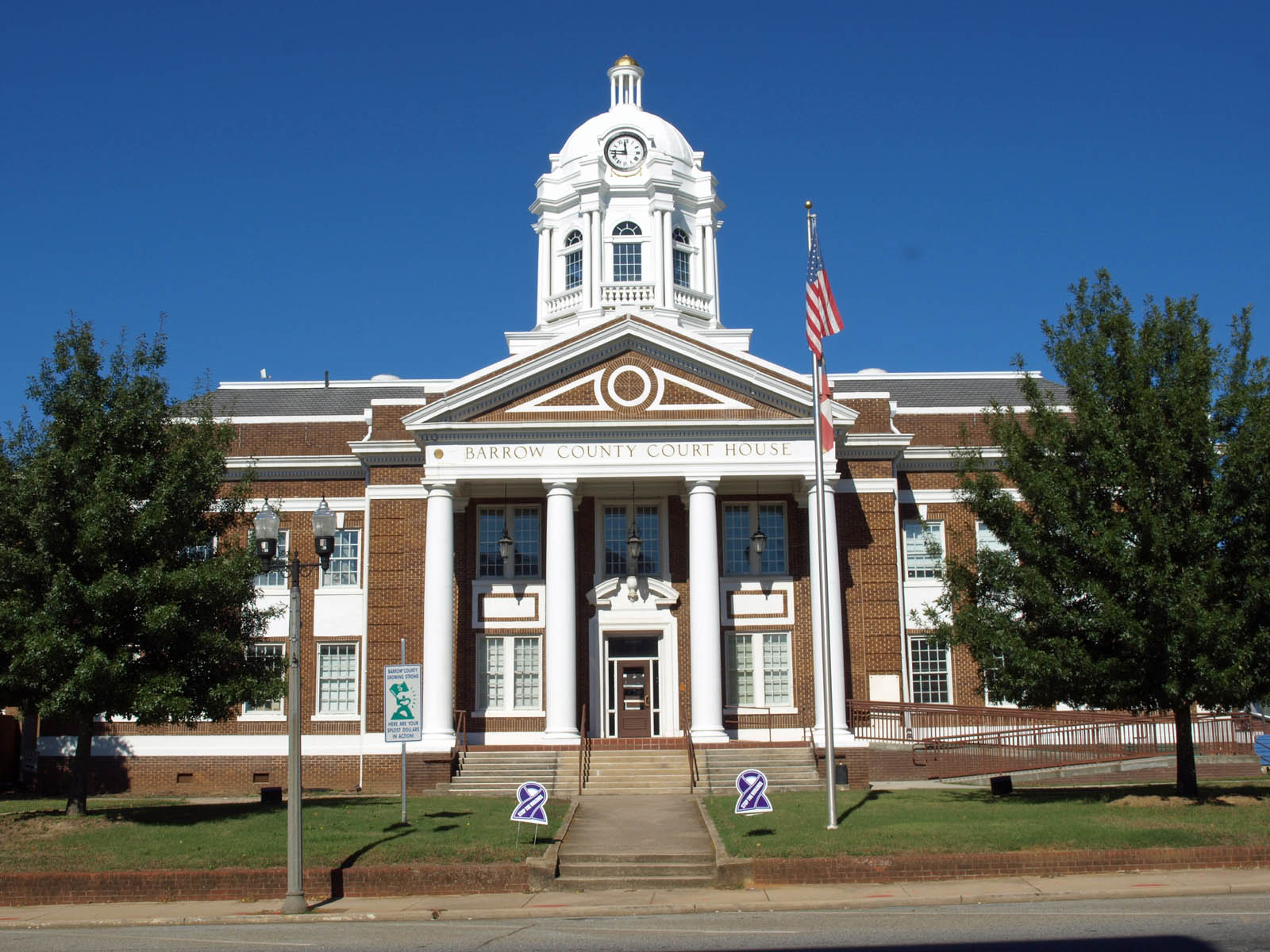

- Location within Georgia
- Interactive map showing the location of Barrow County Courthouse
- Location: Courthouse Sq., Winder, Georgia
- Coordinates: 33°59′32″N 83°43′18″W
- Area: 1.5 acres (0.61 ha)
- Built: 1916 or 1920
- Built by: R.W. Wimbish
- Architect: J.J. Baldwin
- Architectural style: Classical Revival, Late Gothic Revival
- MPS: Georgia County Courthouses TR
- NRHP reference No.: 80000970
- Added to NRHP: September 18, 1980

The Barrow County Courthouse, which is located on Courthouse Sq. in Winder, Georgia, was built in 1916. It was listed on the National Register of Historic Places in 1980.

It was designed by J.J. Baldwin. It has a one-story projecting entrance and a two-story Doric tetrastyleportico. It has a three-stage clock tower with clocks facing in four directions.

The listing included two contributing buildings.
