= Metter High School =

High school in Metter, Candler County, Georgia, United States

Location
- 34905 Georgia Highway 129 South; Metter, Georgia 30439; United States; 32°23′44″N 82°03′50″W

Information
- CEEB code: 112080
- Teaching staff: 32.00 (FTE)
- Grades: 9–12
- Enrollment: 488 (2022-2023)
- Student to teacher ratio: 15.25
- Colors: Orange and black
- Mascot: Tigers
- Website: www.metter.org/o/mhs
- Metter High School
- U.S. National Register of Historic Places
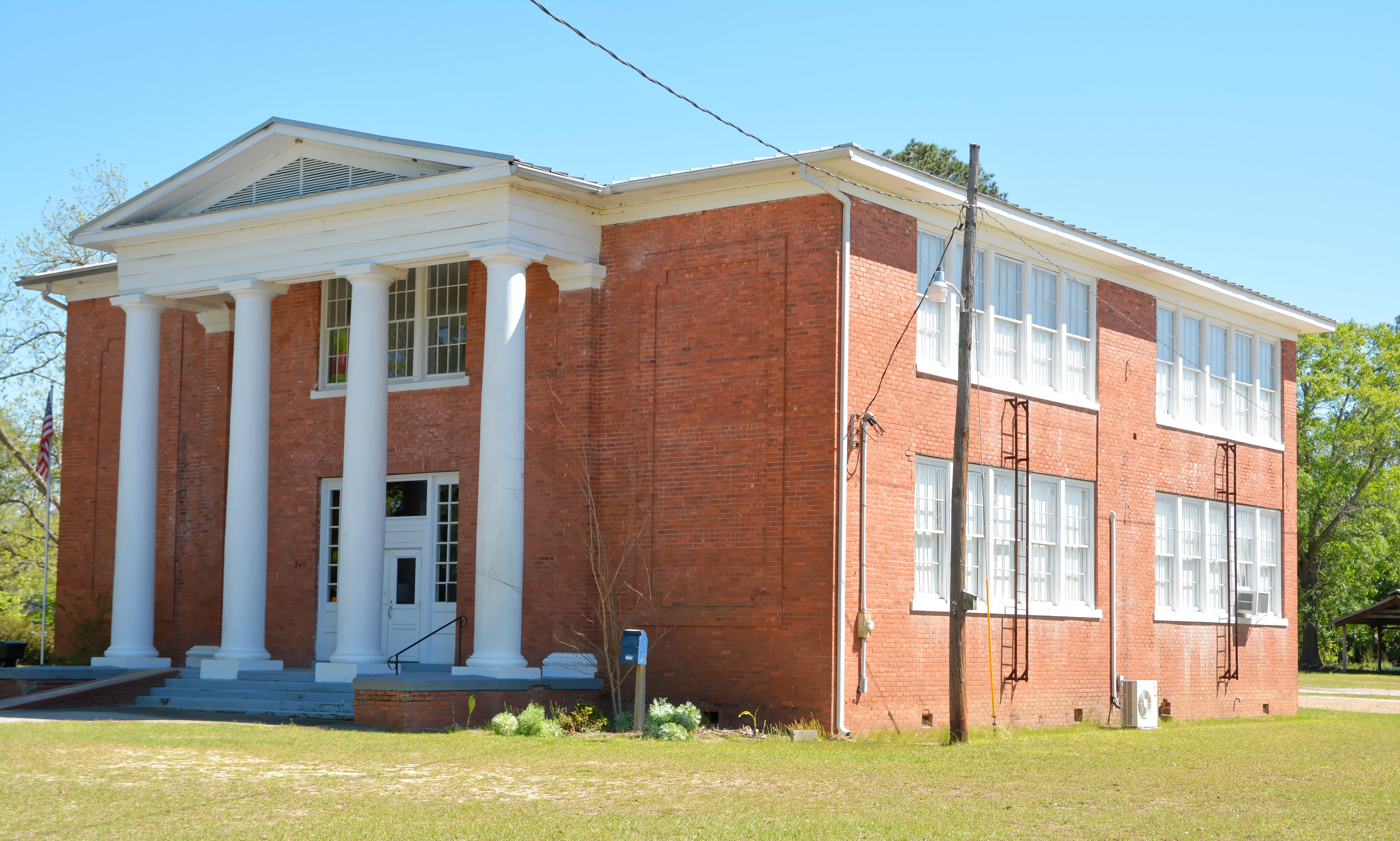
- Former school building, in 2017

- Location within Georgia Location within the United States
- Location: 245 West Vertia St., Metter, Georgia
- Area: 2 acres (0.81 ha)
- Built: 1910
- Architect: C.C. Muse
- Architectural style: Classical Revival
- NRHP reference No.: 02000840
- Added to NRHP: August 9, 2002

Metter High School is a high school in Metter in rural Candler County. It serves grades 9 through 12.

== Historic building ==
The school's old building, at the junction of College Street and Vertia Street, about four blocks away from the current building, was constructed in 1910. It was designed in Classical Revival style by architect C.C. Muse. A new classroom building was built across College Street in 1937, after which the old building was used less and less. The old building was added to the National Register of Historic Places in 2002.

The former school is a two-story building with a full-height, pedimented portico supported by four Doric columns and two brick pilasters. It originally provided education from grade 1 through grade 11 for the white students of the area.

After 1937, a kitchen and lunchroom in a former classroom area were used until about 1955. Vocational training including industrial arts and business classes continued in the old building for many years. It was later used primarily for storage. In 2017, it became home to the Candler County Historical Society Museum.

== Notable alumni ==
- LaVon Mercer (born 1959), American-Israeli basketball player

== See also ==
- National Register of Historic Places listings in Candler County, Georgia
