= Dr. James W. Daniel House =

- U.S. National Register of Historic Places
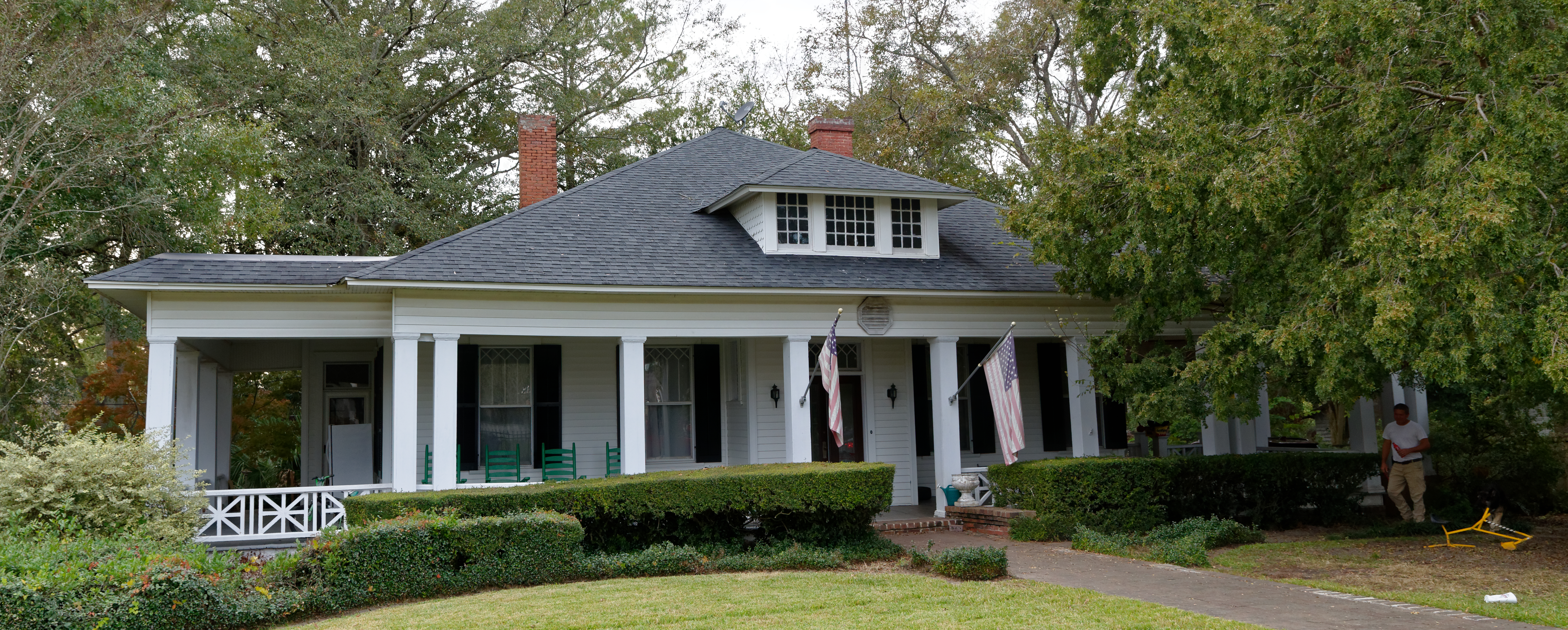

- Location within Georgia
- Location: 102 N. Newton St., Claxton, Georgia
- Coordinates: 32°09′48″N 81°54′19″W
- Area: less than one acre
- Built: 1910
- Architectural style: Colonial Revival, Bungalow/craftsman
- NRHP reference No.: 83000192
- Added to NRHP: April 7, 1983

The Dr. James W. Daniel House, at 102 N. Newton St. in Claxton, Georgia, was built in 1910. It was listed on the National Register of Historic Places in 1983.

It is a Georgian Revival cottage, with Craftsman influence.

James W. Daniel graduated from Jefferson Medical College in Philadelphia. He married Miss Possie B. Callaway, of Gordon Springs, Georgia, in 1909, and the couple came to Claxton to live at his parents' house across the street on N. Newton, while the house was being constructed.

The house is significant to the architectural and local history of Claxton and Evans County. Architecturally, it is a Georgian Revival with American Craftsman style cottage, having been designed by a licensed architect with unusual details making it quite distinct from other construction of the period. It is also significant as the home of Davis, a prominent politician, physician, and philanthropist.
