= South Metter Residential Historic District =

Historic district in Georgia, United States

- U.S. National Register of Historic Places
- U.S. Historic district
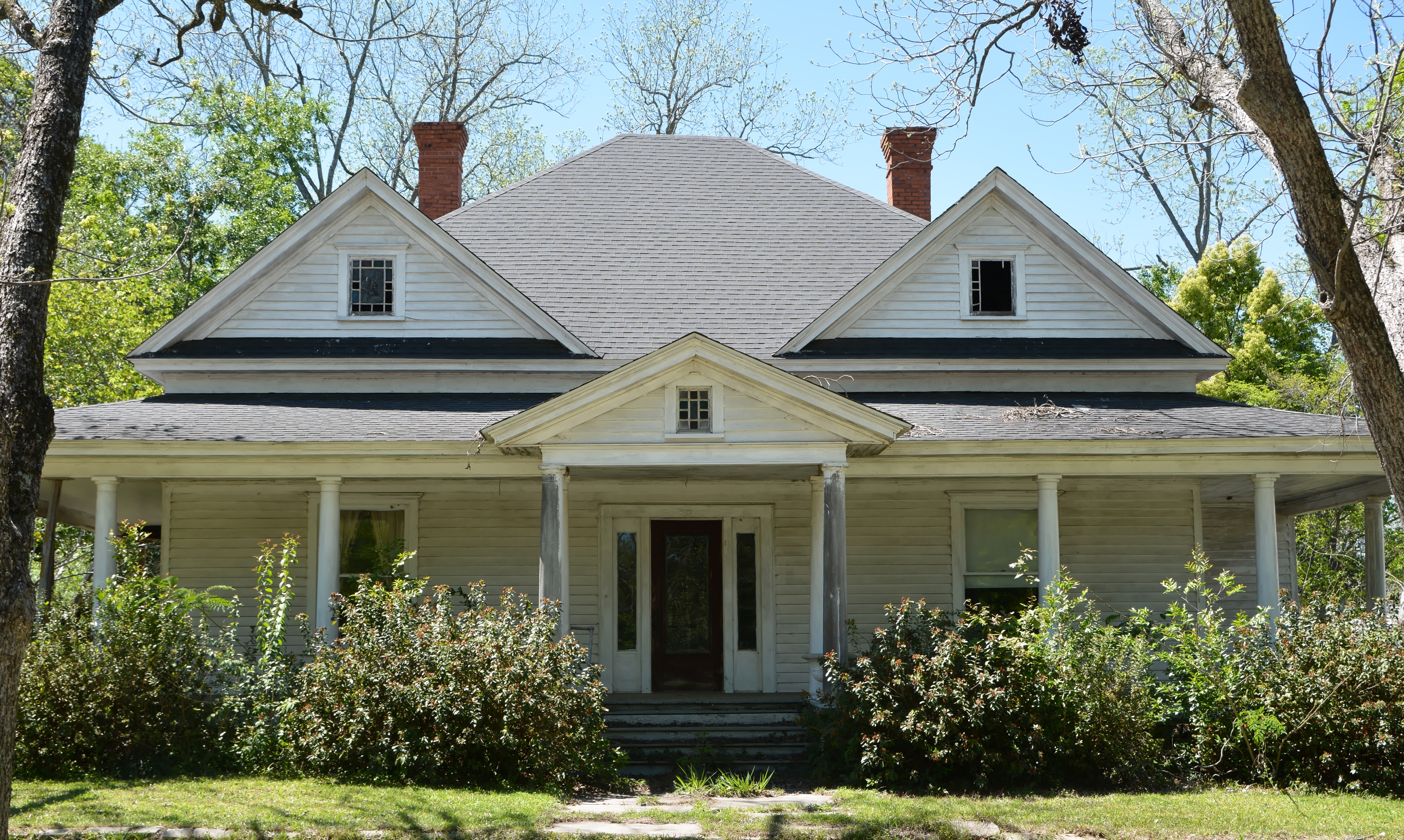

- Location within Georgia Location within the United States
- Location: Roughly bounded by Vertia, S. Kennedy, Hiawatha, and S. Leroy Streets, Metter, Georgia
- Coordinates: 32.3925°N 82.061389°W
- Area: 67 acres (27 ha)
- Built: 1899
- Architect: Multiple
- Architectural style: Victorian Eclectic, Bungalow/craftsman, Tudor Revival
- NRHP reference No.: 87001429
- Added to NRHP: March 15, 1988

The South Metter Residential Historic District is a 67 acres (27 ha) historic district in Metter, Georgia that was listed on the National Register of Historic Places in 1988.

The district is roughly bounded by Vertia St. on the north, S. Leroy St. on the east, Hiawatha St. on the south, and S. Kennedy St. on the west. It is intersected by north-south Roundtree and Lewis Streets and by east-west Pine and Neal Streets. It included 77 contributing buildings, one contributing structure, and two contributing sites, as well as 21 non-contributing buildings and 10 non-contributing sites.

It is level land which James Terrell Trapnell subdivided in 1899 into a grid pattern of rectangular blocks. Most houses date from the late 1890s to 1940 and are of three major architectural styles: "Victorian Eclectic" from 1890s to 1910s, Craftsman/Bungalow from 1910s through 1930s, and English Tudor cottage style from the 1920s and 1930s.
