= LaVon Mercer =

American basketball player (born 1959)

LaVon Mercer לבן מרסר
Personal information
- Born: January 13, 1959 (age 67) Metter, Georgia, U.S.
- Listed height: 6 ft 10 in (2.08 m)
- Listed weight: 220 lb (100 kg)

Career information
- High school: Metter (Metter, Georgia)
- College: Georgia (1976–1980)
- NBA draft: 1980: 3rd round, 60th overall pick
- Drafted by: San Antonio Spurs
- Playing career: 1981–1995
- Position: Center

Career history
- 1981–1988: Hapoel Tel Aviv
- 1988–1995: Maccabi Tel Aviv

Career highlights
- 2× Third-team All-SEC (1979, 1980); Third-team Parade All-American (1976)
- Stats at Basketball Reference

LaVon Mercer (Hebrew: לבן מרסר; born January 13, 1959) is an American-Israeli former basketball player. He played at the center position. As a high school senior, he averaged 37.6 points, 30.1 rebounds, and 12 blocked shots per game, and was named a Parade All-American. Playing college basketball for the Georgia Bulldogs, he became the school's all-time career-leader in blocks and field-goal percentage, set its single-season shooting percentage record, and had the best SEC Tournament career field goal percentage of any SEC player. Drafted by the San Antonio Spurs in the 3rd round of the 1980 NBA draft, he instead played 14 seasons in the Israeli Basketball Premier League, where he was the MVP in 1981. He obtained Israeli citizenship, and also played for the Israeli national basketball team.

== Early and personal life ==
Mercer was born on January 13, 1959, in Metter, Georgia, population 4,000. Shortly after he was born his mother left him, along with his father, leaving his grandmother to raise him. At age 16, after the death of his grandparents, he was homeless.

When he competed Mercer was 6 ft 10 in (2.08 m) tall, and weighed 220 pounds (100 kg). He now has three children; two daughters (Dionn and Gabriell) and a son (Alexander).

== High school ==
Mercer attended Metter High School ('76). His teammates nicknamed him "Tree". He grabbed a state record 41 rebounds in a game in 1975. In 1975–76 he averaged 37.6 points, 30.1 rebounds, and 12 blocked shots per game. In his senior year he was named the Georgia High School Player of the Year, and a Parade All-American. He was named the No. 1 high school player in Georgia by The Atlanta Journal. There was a degree of local racial prejudice at the time. He said: "Townfolk called Coach West.... They asked him why he was starting five blacks on the basketball team. He told 'em it was 'cause we were the best players. When we won our first 12 straight, the calls stopped and the gym – it filled up."

Writing in The Atlantic Journal, Tom Tucker observed: "He can leap so high he hits his head on the rim. He doesn't block shots, he pounds the rejected basketball into the cheering grandstands like a beach ball. He has the soft touch of a great shooter, and when he goes for a rebound, he roars like a lion scaring anyone near him." Over 300 colleges recruited Mercer. The high school retired his jersey in 2014, the first time it had retired a player's jersey number.

== College ==
In college, Mercer played for the University of Georgia from 1976 to 80. In 1977–78 he averaged 8.4 rebounds per game for the Bulldogs. In 1978–79 he averaged 13.4 points and 7.7 rebounds per game with a .643 field goal percentage, and was named All-Southeastern Conference – 3rd Team. In 1979–80 he averaged 11.5 points and 7.8 rebounds per game with a .611 field goal percentage, playing alongside Dominique Wilkins, and was All-SEC – 3rd Team.

Mercer is Georgia's all-time career-leader in blocks (327; fourth-highest in the SEC behind Jarvis Varnado, Shaquille O'Neal, and Kyle Davis; a 2.8 blocks per game average) and field-goal percentage (.602), and holds its single-season shooting percentage record (64.2%, in 1979). He is also had the third-best season of any Georgia player in blocked shots (88, in both his freshman and sophomore years, in 1977 and 1978), and the best SEC Tournament career field goal percentage of any SEC player (75.8%). He was named the Bulldog's 2004 SEC Legend.

== Professional career ==
Mercer was selected by the San Antonio Spurs in the 3rd round (60th overall) of the 1980 NBA draft. He went to the team's rookie camp and the team was interested in him, but he decided to instead play in Israel.

In the 1980s and 1990s, Mercer played professional basketball in Israel for 14 years in the Israeli Basketball Premier League for Hapoel Tel Aviv (1981–1988) and Maccabi Tel Aviv (1988–1995). Mercer led his teams to 6 Israeli Championships (1989, 1990, 1991, 1992, 1994, 1995), and 5 Israeli State Cups (1984, 1989, 1990, 1991, 1994). In 1980–81 he was the season MVP. In 1986–87 he had his highest-scoring season, at 23.4 points per game. While playing for Maccabi, the club reached the Euroleague finals in 1989, and the Euroleague semifinals in 1991. He was called the "Israeli Michael Jordan".

Mercer became an Israeli citizen, and served in the Israel Defense Forces for two years. Mercer also played for the Israeli national basketball team in the 1986 FIBA World Championship and 1987 Eurobasket Championship. In 1982, having formerly been Baptist, he converted to Judaism. He said that "I guess you could call me a Messianic Jew or a Christian Jew. When I was over there it was the closest I felt to God. I really defend the state of Israel...." In 2006 he was honored by the Israeli Consulate to the Southeast United States and made an official goodwill ambassador for the State of Israel.

Commenting on his years in Israel, Mercer said "I was pretty in awe of the lifestyle ... I really wasn't planning on leaving, but my family wanted to come back to the States." He returned to the United States in the mid-1990s, after 14 years in Israel.

== Life after competing ==
After Mercer returned to the United States, in 1994 he completed his BA in Behavioral Sciences at National Louis University.

Beginning in 2003, Mercer served as the women's varsity basketball coach and Associate Athletic Director at Spelman College in Georgia. He then became a member of an insurance team, dealing in life and health insurance.
