= Candler County Courthouse =

- U.S. National Register of Historic Places
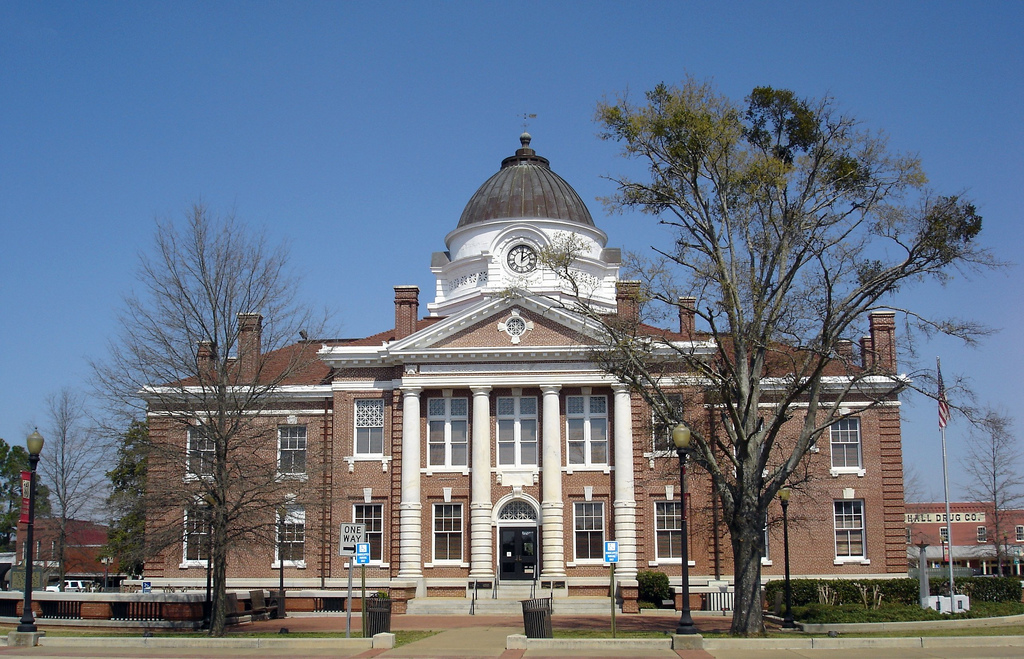
- Courthouse in 2007

- Location within Georgia Location within the United States
- Interactive map showing the location of Candler County Courthouse
- Location: Courthouse Sq., Metter, Georgia
- Coordinates: 32°23′48″N 82°03′45″W
- Area: less than one acre
- Built: 1921
- Architect: J.J. Baldwin
- Architectural style: Neoclassical
- MPS: Georgia County Courthouses TR
- NRHP reference No.: 80000984
- Added to NRHP: September 18, 1980

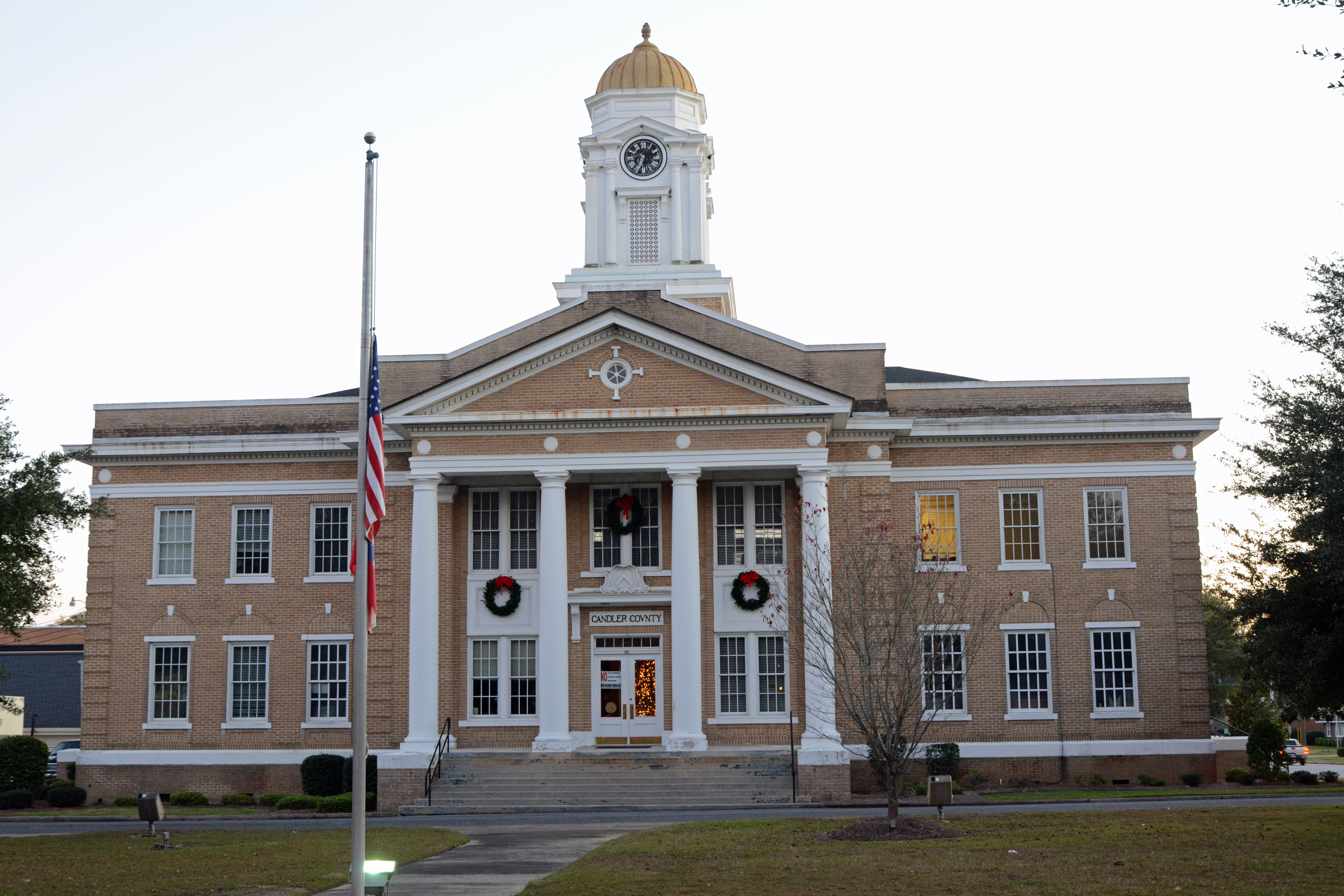
Courthouse after some remodeling

Candler County Courthouse is a historic county courthouse in Metter, Georgia, county seat of Candler County, Georgia. The courthouse was built in a Neoclassical style in 1921 according to designs by J.J. Baldwin. It was added to the National Register of Historic Places on September 18, 1980. It is located in Courthouse Square.

== See also ==
- National Register of Historic Places listings in Candler County, Georgia
