= James J. Baldwin =

American architect (1888–1955)

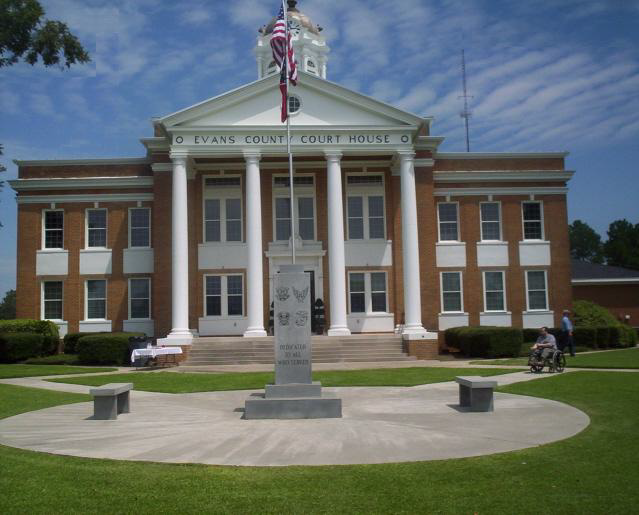
Evans County Courthouse

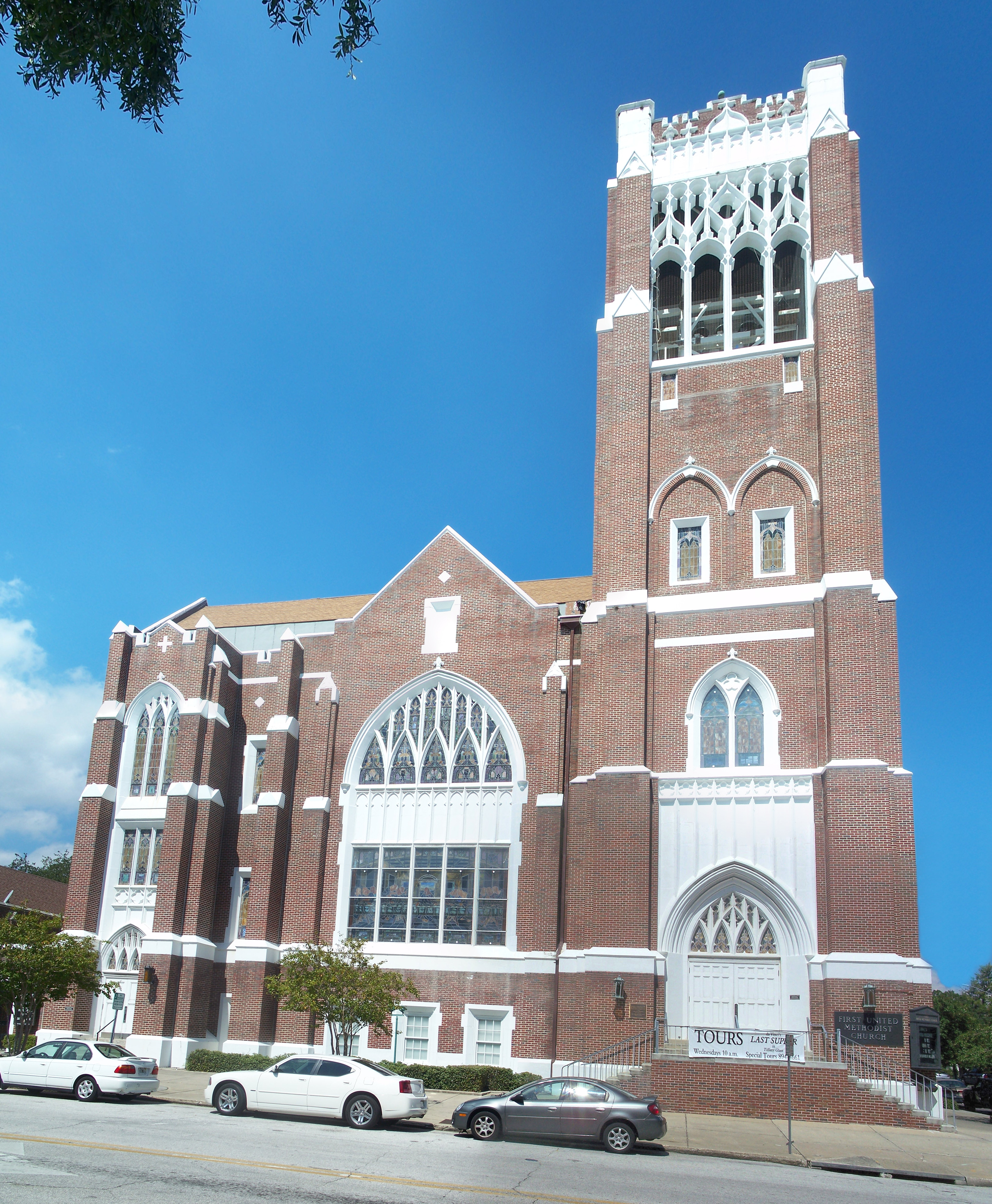
First Methodist Church of St. Petersburg

James J. Baldwin (1888–1955), commonly known as J.J. Baldwin, was an American architect who designed numerous courthouse buildings and other works in several U.S. states. His most spectacular work is the Cherokee County Courthouse located in the farthest west corner of North Carolina.

He graduated from the University of South Carolina in 1907 and also studied architecture at the University of Pennsylvania.

For various periods he worked in Anderson, South Carolina, in Asheville, North Carolina, in Chattanooga, Tennessee, and in Washington, D.C.

A number of his works are listed on the National Register of Historic Places.

Works include:

- One or more works in Anderson Downtown Historic District (boundary increase), 402 N. Main St., Anderson, SC (Baldwin, James J.), NRHP-listed
- Atkinson County Courthouse, Austin at Main St., Pearson, GA (Baldwin, J.J.), NRHP-listed
- Bacon County Courthouse, Main St., Alma, GA (Baldwin, J.J.), NRHP-listed
- Baldwin-Coker Cottage, 226 Lower Lake Rd., Highlands, NC (Baldwin, James John), NRHP-listed
- Bank of French Broad, 100 Main St., Marshall, NC (Baldwin, James J.), NRHP-listed
- Barrow County Courthouse, Courthouse Sq., Winder, GA (Baldwin, J.J.; Wimbish, R.W.), NRHP-listed
- Candler County Courthouse, Courthouse Sq., Metter, GA (Baldwin, J.J.), NRHP-listed
- Cherokee County Courthouse, Peachtree and Central Sts., Murphy, NC (Baldwin, James J.), NRHP-listed
- Evans County Courthouse, Courthouse Sq., Claxton, GA (Baldwin, J.J.), NRHP-listed
- First Methodist Church of St. Petersburg, 212 Third St., N, St. Petersburg, FL (Baldwin, James J.), NRHP-listed
- Lee County Courthouse, Courthouse Sq., Leesburg, GA (Baldwin, J.J.), NRHP-listed
- Liberty County Courthouse, Courthouse Sq., Hinesville, GA (Baldwin, J.J.), NRHP-listed
- One or more works in Main Street Historic District, roughly bounded by Blanton Alley, Huntley St., Yarboro St., and Broadway St., Forest City, NC (Baldwin, James J.), NRHP-listed
- One or more works in Marshall Main Street Historic District, 101 N. Main St.- 165 S. Main St., Bridge St. and 33 Bailey's Branch Rd., Marshall, NC (Baldwin, James J.), NRHP-listed
- One or more works in Rochelle Historic District, centered on 1st Ave and Ashley St., Rochelle, GA (Baldwin, James J.), NRHP-listed
- First Baptist Church of Rochelle, 701 Gordon St., Rochelle, GA (Baldwin, J.J.), NRHP-listed
- Emory Edward Satterfield House, 504 W. Howell St., Hartwell, GA (Baldwin, James J.), NRHP-listed
- Treutlen County Courthouse, Courthouse Sq., Soperton, GA (Baldwin, J.J.), NRHP-listed
