= Rochelle Historic District =

Historic district in Georgia, United States

- U.S. National Register of Historic Places
- U.S. Historic district
- Location within Georgia Location within the United States
- Location: Centered on 1st Ave and Ashley St., Rochelle, Georgia
- Coordinates: 31°57′03″N 83°27′22″W
- Area: 260 acres (110 ha)
- Built: 1887
- Architect: James J. Baldwin, others
- Architectural style: Late Victorian, Late 19th And 20th Century Revivals
- NRHP reference No.: 07001398
- Added to NRHP: January 15, 2008

The Rochelle Historic District is a 260-acre (110 ha) historic district in Rochelle, Georgia that was listed on the National Register of Historic Places in 2008. It is centered on 1st Avenue and Ashley Street. The district included 180 buildings deemed to be contributing resources, two other contributing structures, and two contributing sites. It also included 90 non-contributing buildings and structures.

One building included is the First Baptist Church of Rochelle (1918), at the corner of Gordon Street and 3rd Avenue, designed by architect James J. Baldwin.
