= First Methodist Church of St. Petersburg =

Historic church in Florida, United States

- U.S. National Register of Historic Places
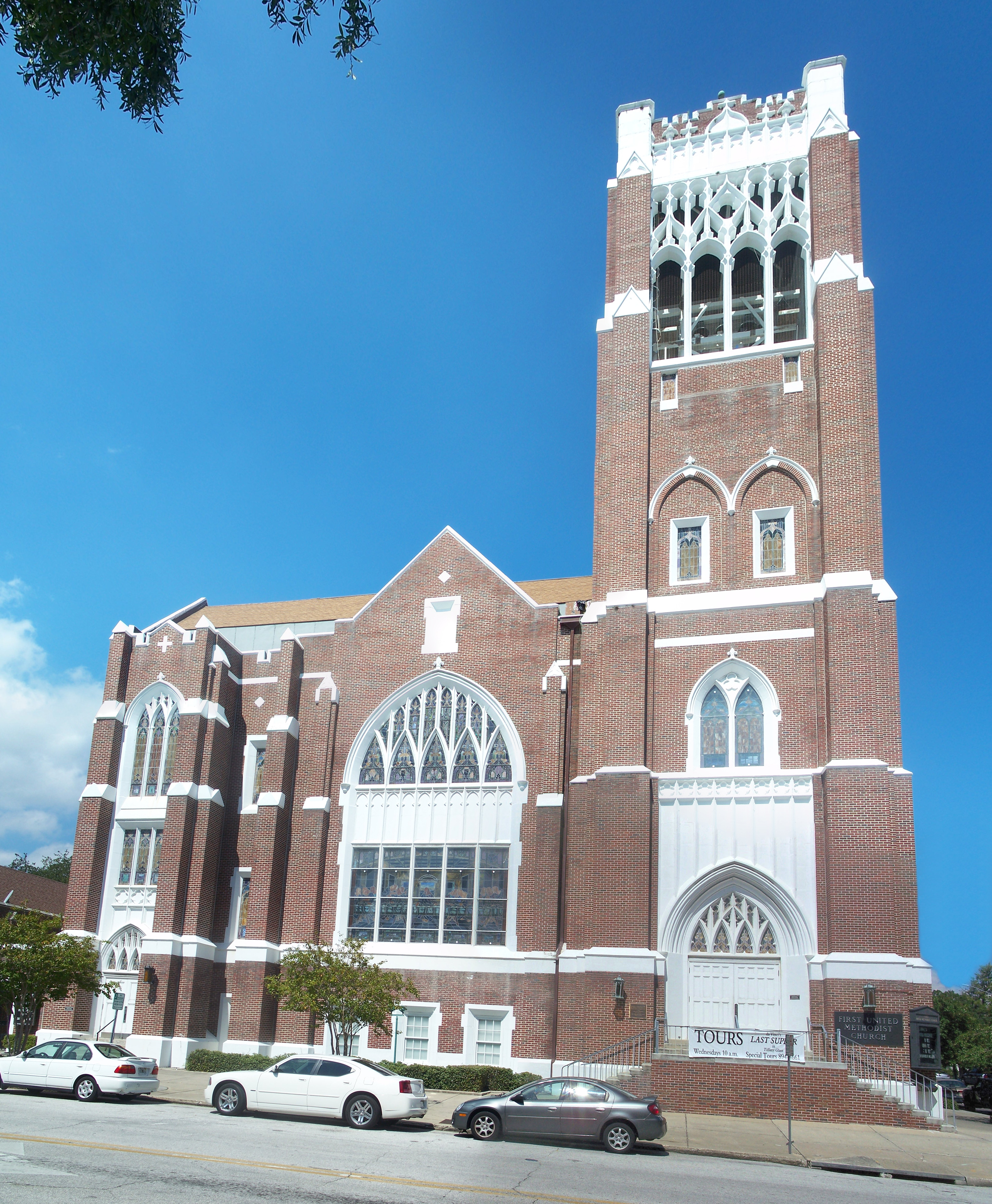

- Location within Florida Location within the United States
- Location: 212 Third St., N, St. Petersburg, Florida
- Coordinates: 27°46′31″N 82°38′15″W
- Area: less than one acre
- Built: 1925
- Architect: Baldwin, James J.; Whitaker, Charles C.
- Architectural style: Late Gothic Revival
- NRHP reference No.: 90001433
- Added to NRHP: September 13, 1990

The First Methodist Church of St. Petersburg (also known as the First United Methodist Church of St. Petersburg) is a historic church in St. Petersburg, Florida. It is located at 212 3rd Street, North. On September 13, 1990, it was added to the U.S. National Register of Historic Places.
