= Evans County Courthouse =

Historic courthouse in Georgia, US

- U.S. National Register of Historic Places
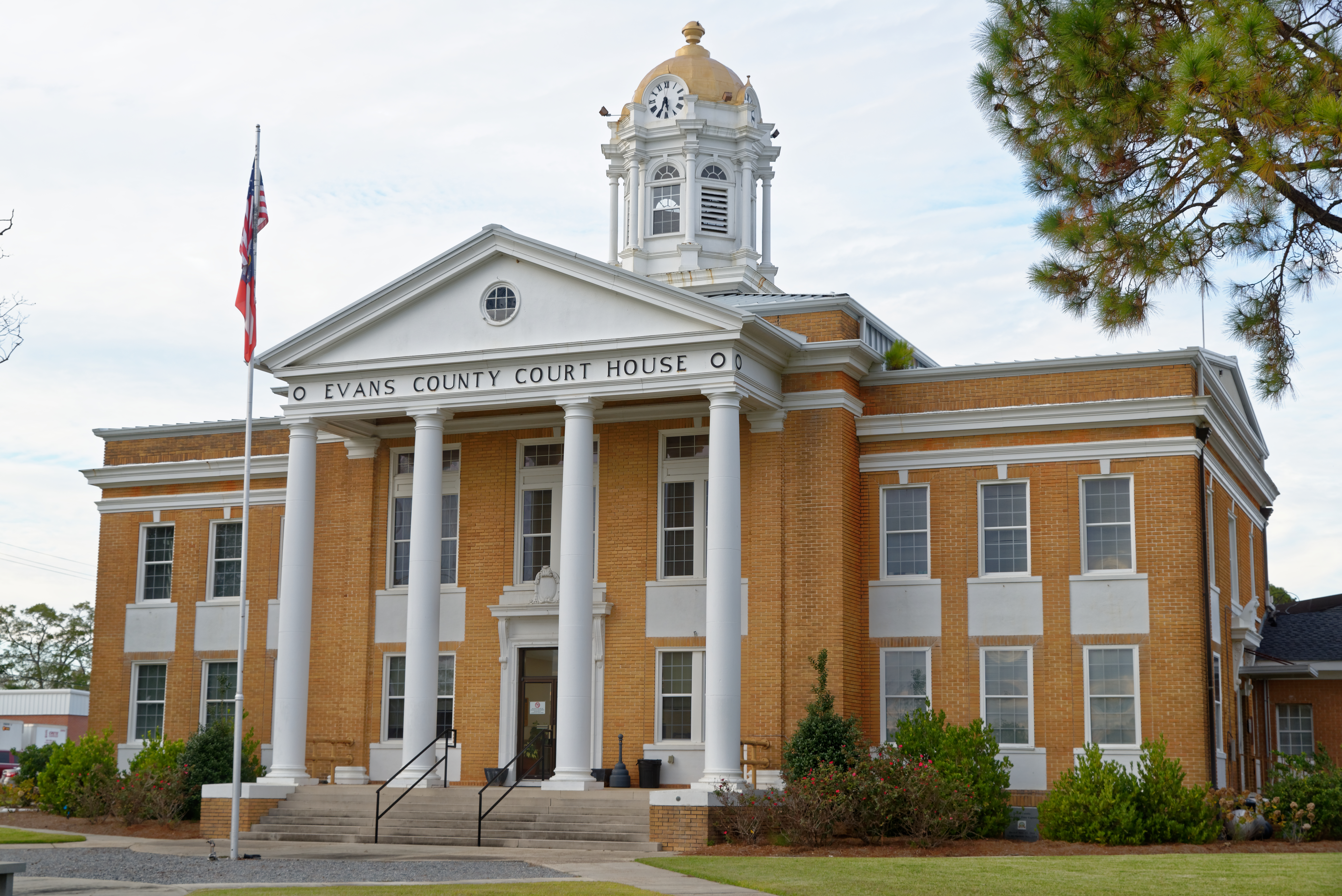
- Evans County Courthouse (2018)

- Location within Georgia Location within the United States
- Location: Courthouse Sq. Claxton, Georgia
- Coordinates: 32°9′42″N 81°54′28″W
- Built: 1923
- Architect: Baldwin, J.J.
- Architectural style: Neoclassical revival
- MPS: Georgia County Courthouses TR
- NRHP reference No.: 80001018
- Added to NRHP: September 18, 1980

The Evans County Courthouse is a historic government building and clock tower located in the city of Claxton, Georgia, United States, the seat of Evans County. The courthouse was built in 1923 and is the home of Evans County's Superior Court and the base of the county's government. On September 18, 1980, the building was added to the National Register of Historic Places.

== History ==
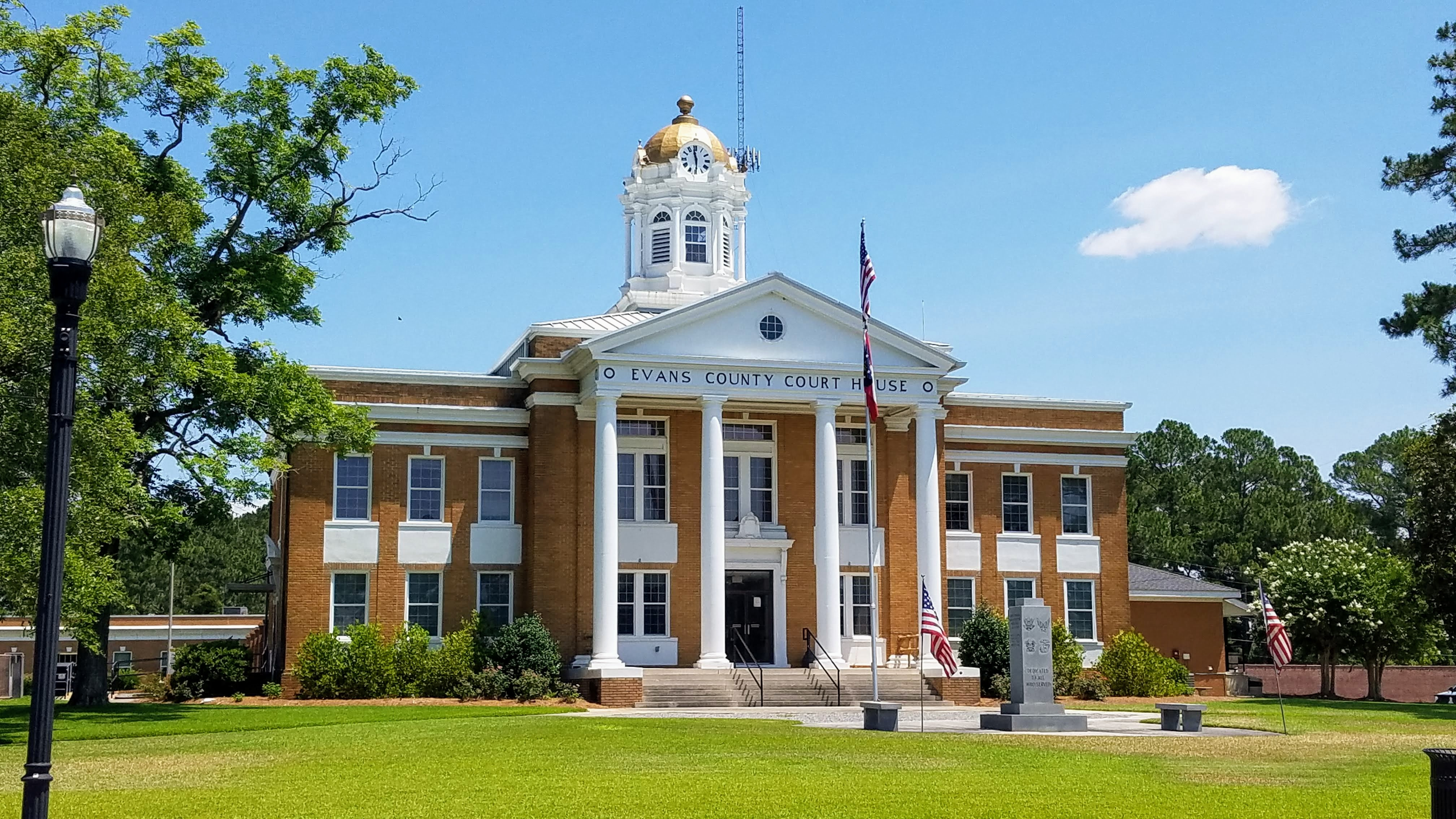
Evans County Courthouse (2012)

Evans County was created in 1914, first by a proposed constitutional amendment in the Georgia General Assembly on August 11 and then officially ratified by a vote of the citizens of Georgia on November 23. With the creation of the new county a courthouse was needed. The first building used as such was the White Building, a three-story edifice built by Mr. R. King White and later bought by Mrs. Ben Daniel. Mrs. Daniel's husband, Dr. Ben Daniel, used the building as his office. This building was used until 1923, when the current courthouse was completed. The work was done by J.J. Baldwin and West Point Iron Works for $60,000. On December 28, 1994 the American Legion erected a monument to those men from the county who died in various wars, beginning with World War I and ending with the Vietnam War. The interior to the courthouse was remodeled in 1979 and 1980 and, in 2003, the bell tower clock was restored.

== See also ==
- National Register of Historic Places listings in Evans County, Georgia
