= Main Street Historic District (Forest City, North Carolina) =

Historic district in North Carolina, United States

- U.S. National Register of Historic Places
- U.S. Historic district
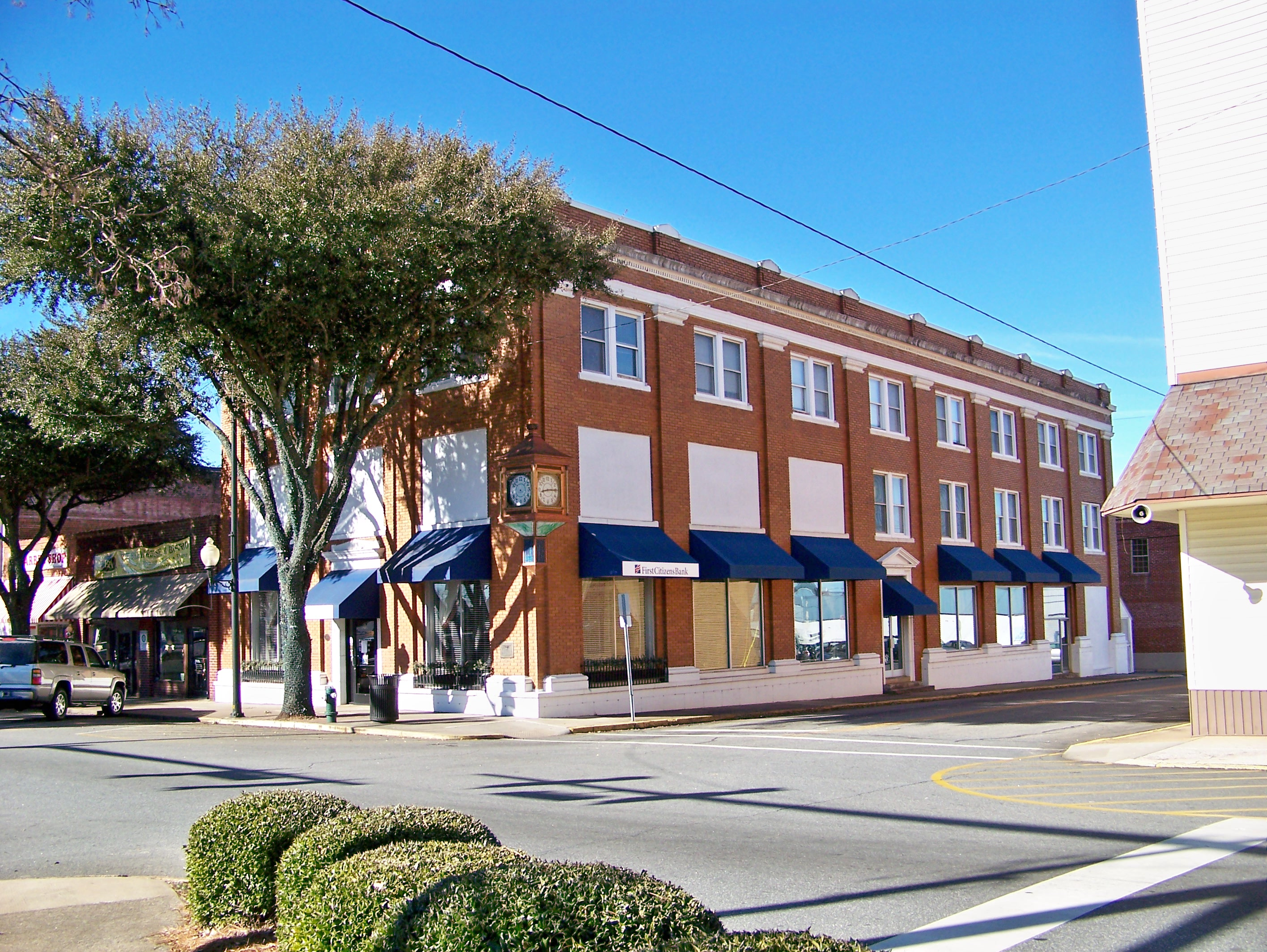
- Former National Bank of Forest City, Main Street Historic District, February 2014

- Location within North Carolina Location within the United States
- Location: Rpughly bounded by Blanton Alley, Huntley St., Yarboro St., and Broadway St.; also 186 Mill St., Forest City, North Carolina
- Coordinates: 35°19′59″N 81°51′54″W
- Area: 16 acres (6.5 ha)
- Architect: Baldwin, James J.
- Architectural style: Early Commercial, Classical Revival, Timber Mill Const., et.al.
- NRHP reference No.: 02000017, 04000585 (Boundary Increase)
- Added to NRHP: February 14, 2002, June 9, 2004 (Boundary Increase)

Main Street Historic District is a national historic district located at Forest City, Rutherford County, North Carolina. It encompasses 61 contributing buildings, 1 contributing site, and 1 contributing structure in the central business district of Forest City. The district developed from the late 1880s through the 1920s, and includes notable examples of Classical Revival style architecture. Notable contributing buildings include the U.S. Post Office (1937), the Davis Sisters Building (after 1932), the Farmers Bank and Trust building (1923), National Bank of Forest City (1923), the Tuberculosis Center (1902), the Romina Theater (1928), the Town Hall (1928) designed by James J. Baldwin, the Blanton Hotel (1925), the Reinhardt Drug Company Building (by 1908), the First Wesleyan Church (1922), and the Florence Mill (1897-1941).

It was added to the National Register of Historic Places in 2002, with a boundary increase in 2004.

== Gallery ==
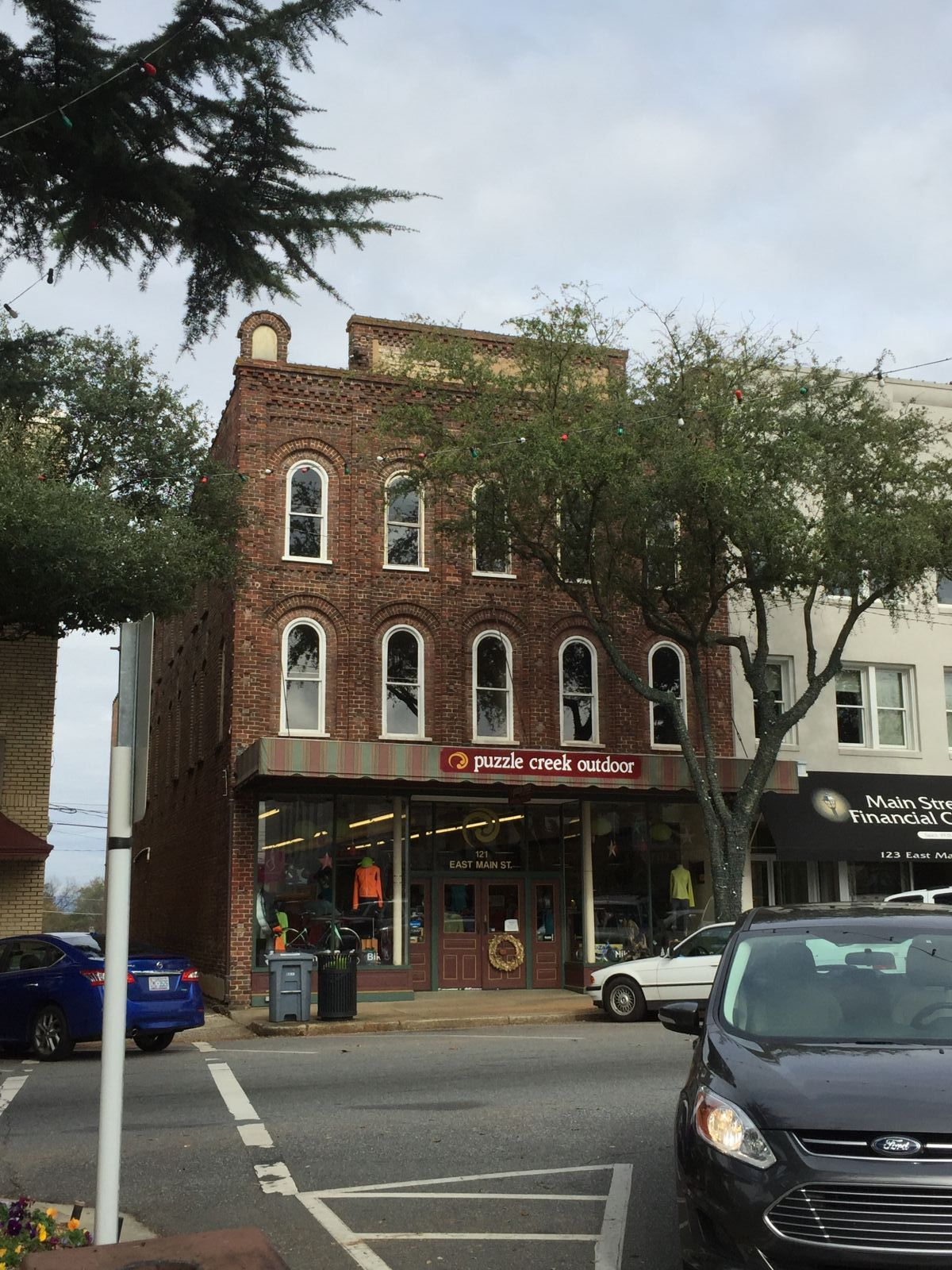
Former Tuberculosis Center

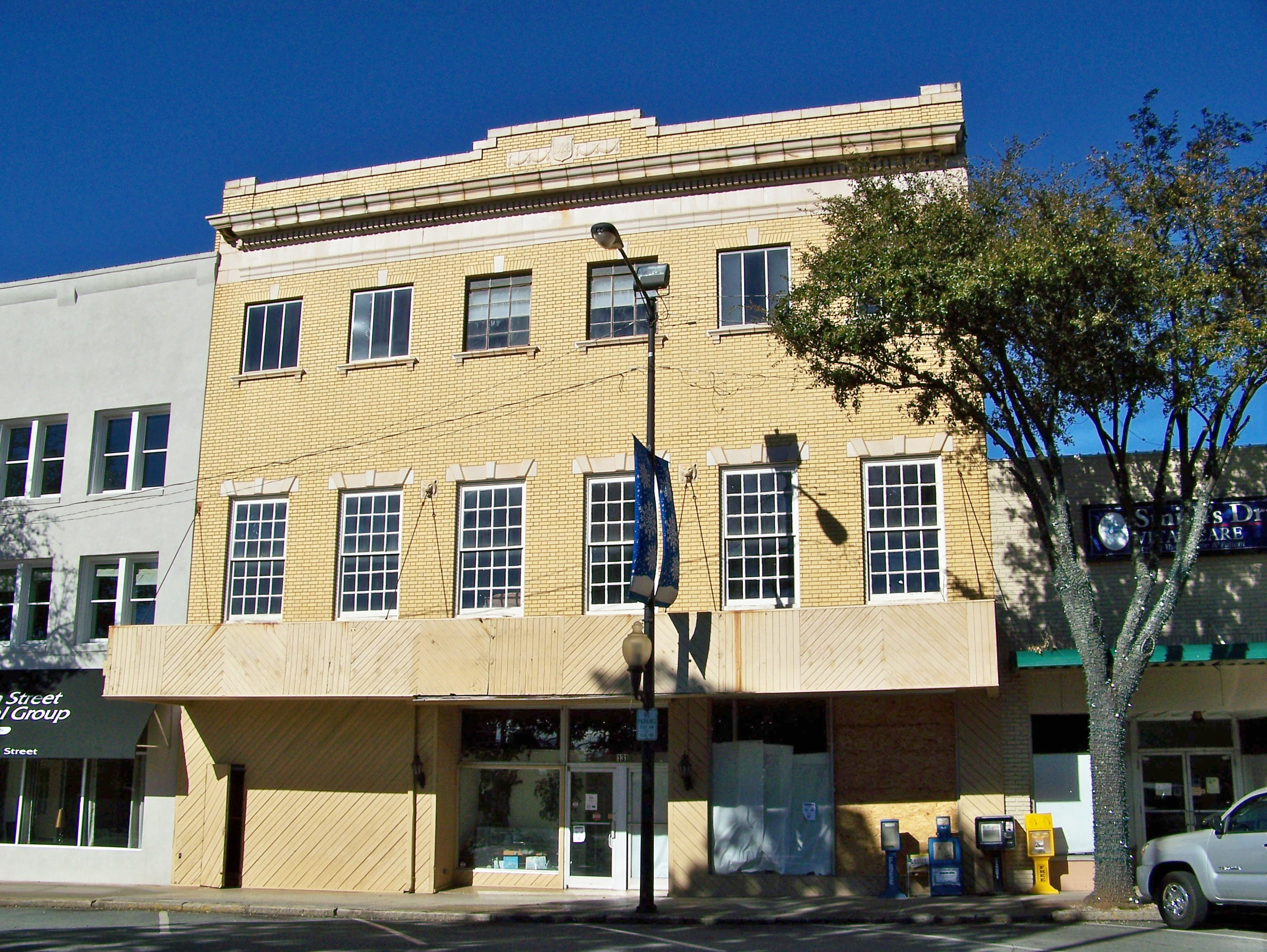
Former Romina Theater

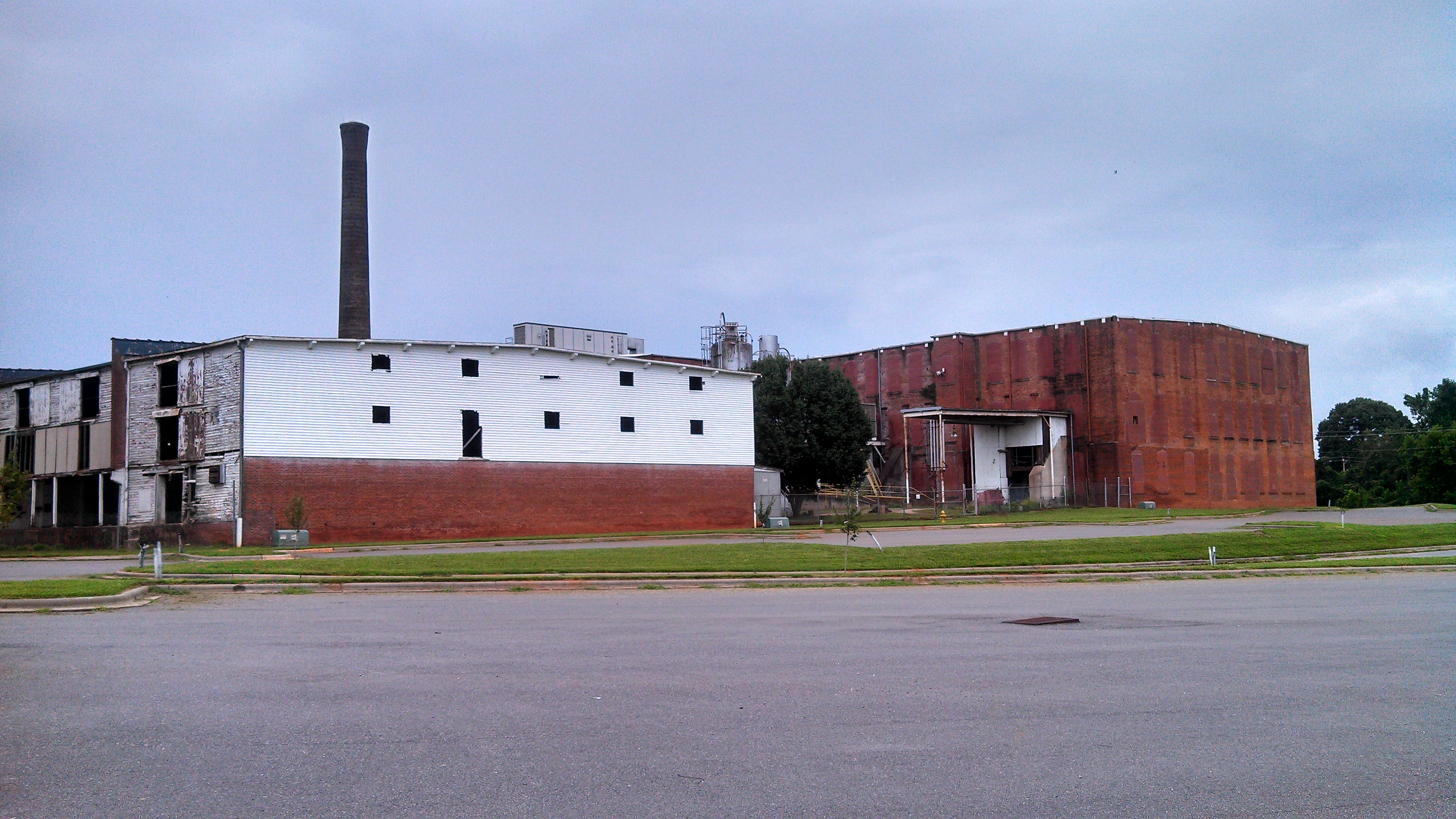
Florence Mill

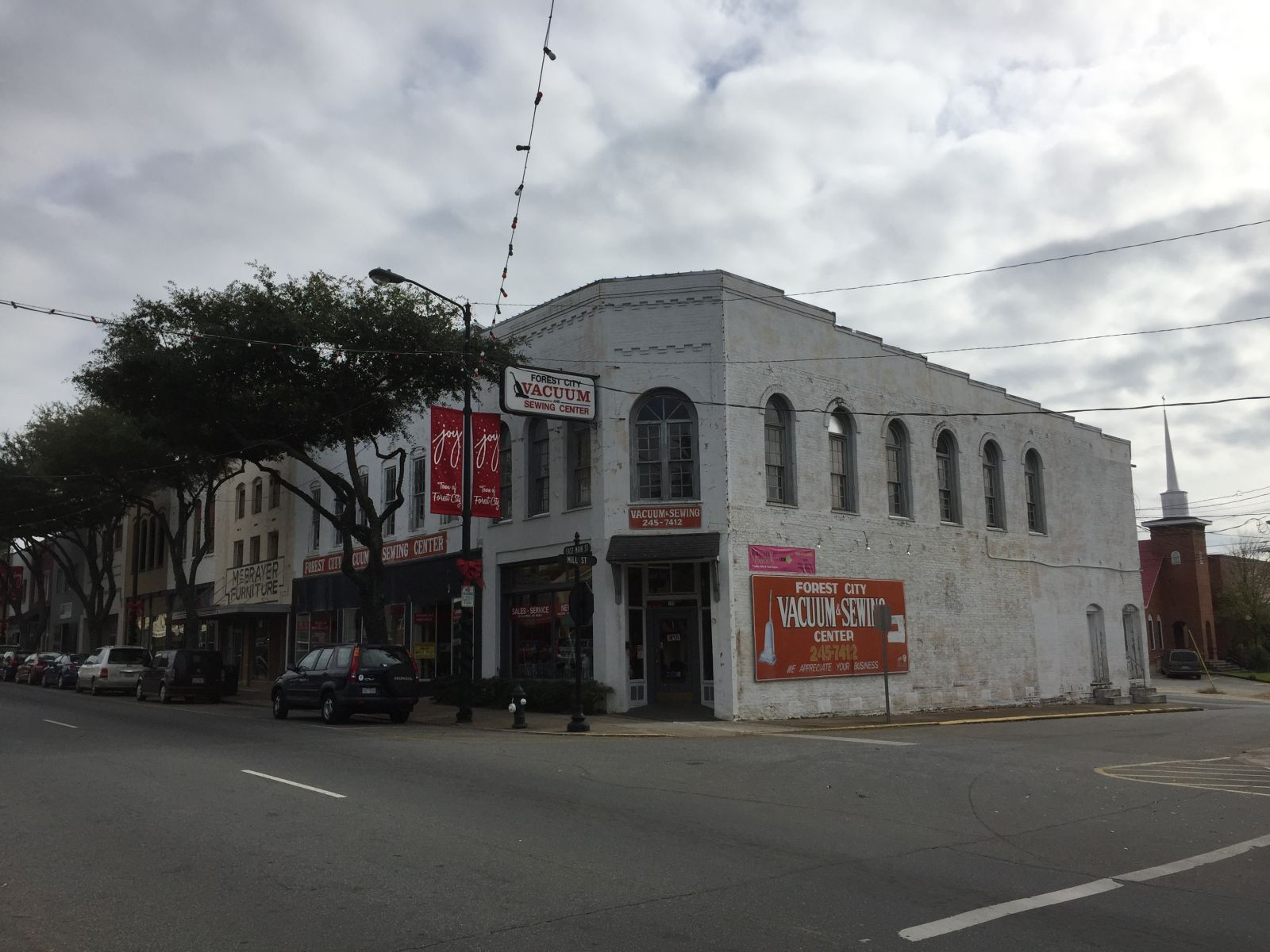
Reinhardt Drug Co.
