= George W. DeLoach House =

Historic house in Georgia, United States

- U.S. National Register of Historic Places
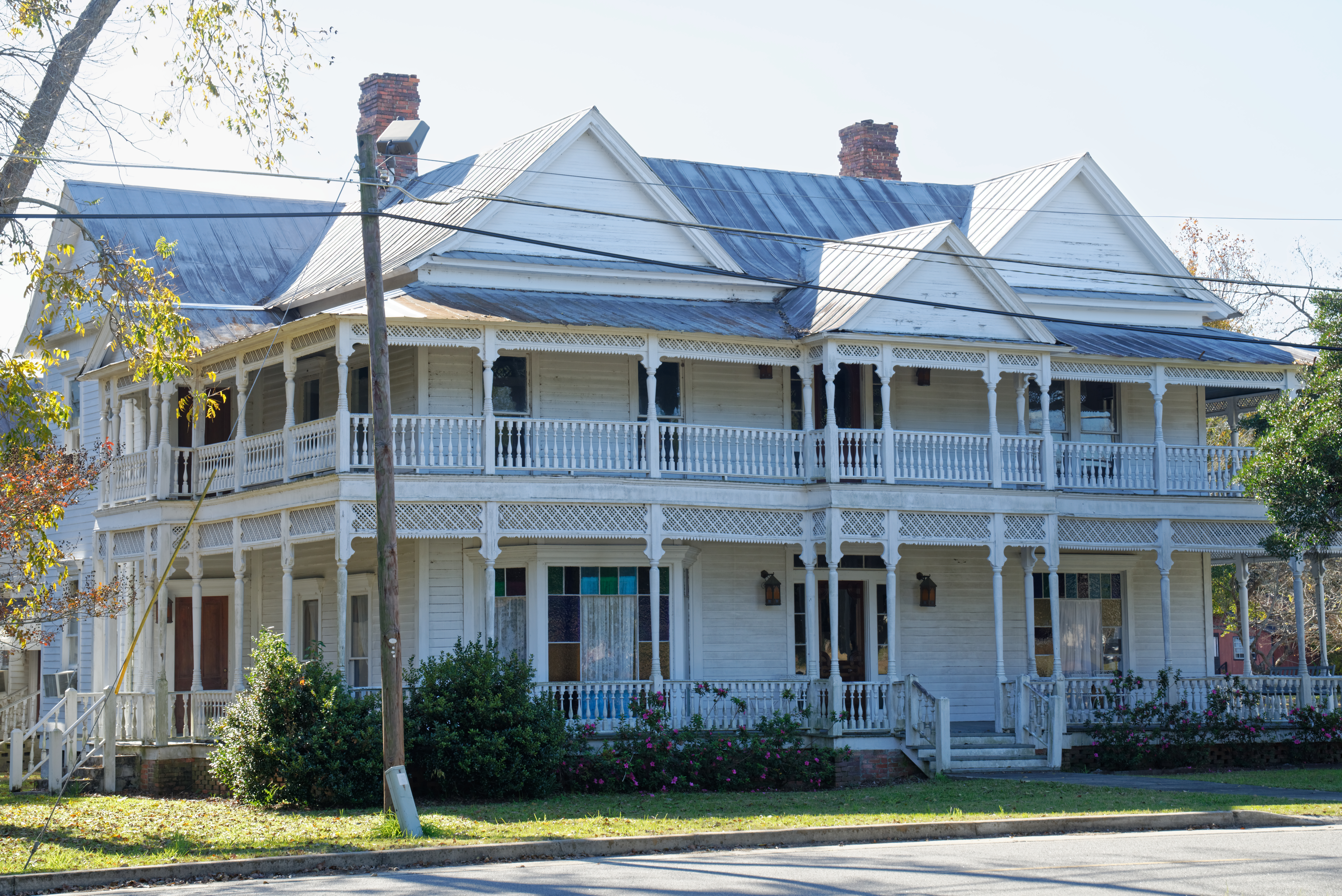
- George W. DeLoach House in 2019

- Location within Georgia Location within the United States
- Location: S. Railroad Ave., and Strickland St., Hagan, Georgia
- Coordinates: 32°9′19″N 81°56′0″W
- Area: 0.5 acres (0.20 ha)
- Built: 1895
- Built by: D.J. Nobles
- Architect: D.J. Nobles
- Architectural style: Late Victorian, Victorian Eclectic
- NRHP reference No.: 82002412
- Added to NRHP: June 28, 1982

The George W. DeLoach House is a historic home in Hagan, Georgia. The house was built in 1892 by George Wesley DeLoach and is an example of a Victorian style of architecture called "The New Planter Style". DeLoach was an early settler in Hagan and was instrumental in the creation of Evans County, Georgia. The house was placed on the National Register of Historic Places on June 28, 1982.

== See also ==
- National Register of Historic Places listings in Evans County, Georgia
