= Pulaski, Georgia =

- Town
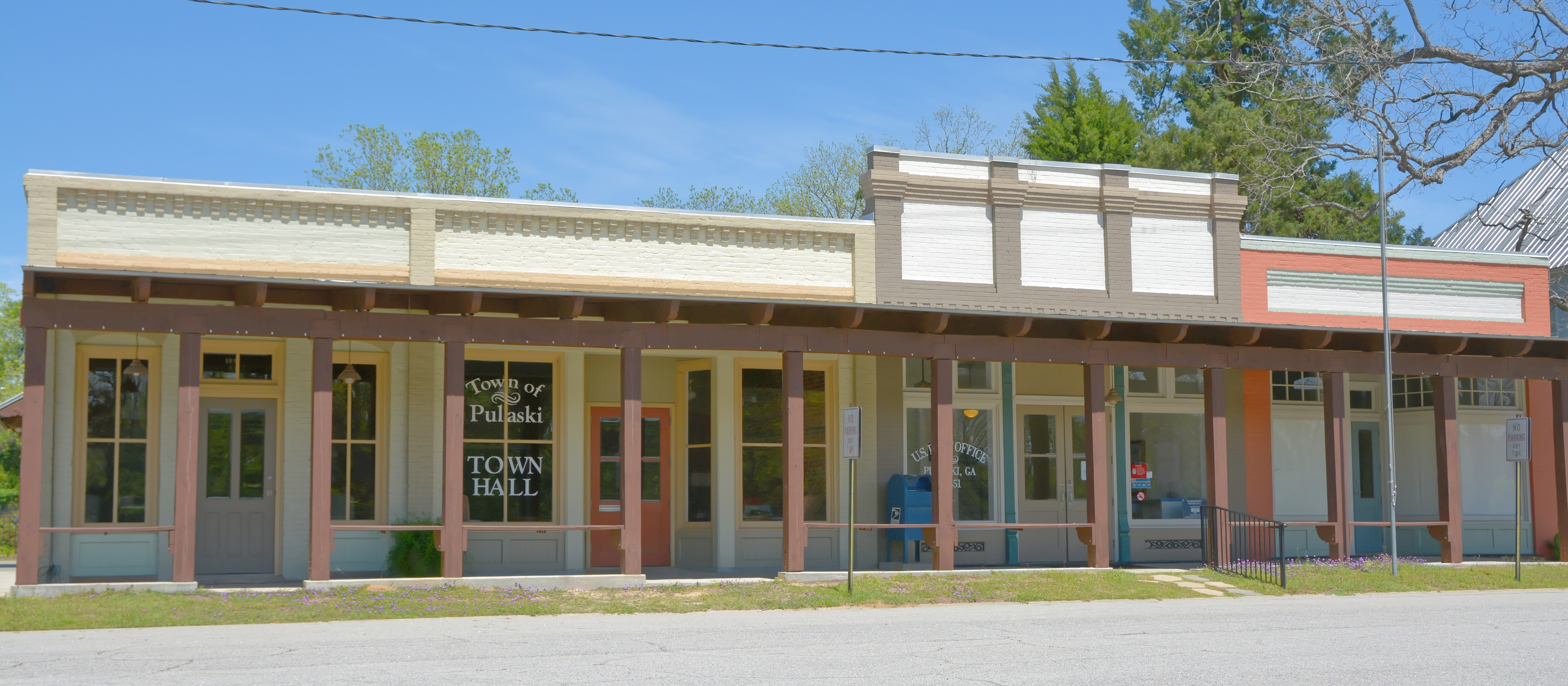
- Town hall and post office

- Location in Candler County and the state of Georgia
- Coordinates: 32°23′28″N 81°57′22″W
- Country: United States
- State: Georgia
- County: Candler

Area
  - Total: 0.80 sq mi (2.07 km^{2})
  - Land: 0.80 sq mi (2.06 km^{2})
  - Water: 0.0039 sq mi (0.01 km^{2})
- Elevation: 210 ft (64 m)

Population (2020)
  - Total: 211
  - Density: 264.9/sq mi (102.26/km^{2})
- Time zone: UTC-5 (Eastern (EST))
  - Summer (DST): UTC-4 (EDT)
- ZIP code: 30451
- Area code: 912
- FIPS code: 13-63000
- GNIS feature ID: 0321217
- Website: georgiainfo.galileo.usg.edu/topics/historical_markers/county/candler/pulaski-georgia

Pulaski is a town in Candler County, Georgia, United States. The population was 211 in 2020.

== History ==
The community was founded in 1900 as a railroad town, and in 1905 the Georgia General Assembly incorporated Pulaski as a town. The town was named for Count Casimir Pulaski, a Polish American Revolutionary War hero.

The town developed initially with a hotel and several stores. The Central of Georgia Railway Company connected the community to Savannah and Dublin. Around the turn of the 19th century, early resident Leonard Franklin built the Pulaski Hotel. He built additional buildings on his surrounding property. He donated a portion of his property to the Black Community for the construction of building that doubled as a school and Prince Hall Freemasonry lodge space. By 1924, the town's largest employer was the turpentine distillery.

In 1948, Pulaski was Candler County's second largest town (second to Metter) and dealt in the shipping and trading industries. The schools systems at this time within Candler County were segregated.

== Geography ==
Pulaski is located in eastern Candler County at 32°23′28″N 81°57′22″W (32.390979, -81.956167). Georgia State Route 46 passes through the town, leading west 6 miles (10 km) to Metter, the county seat. Interstate 16, an east–west highway connecting Savannah and Macon, is 3.5 miles (5.6 km) to the south.

According to the United States Census Bureau, Pulaski has a total area of 0.81 square miles (2.1 km^{2}), all of it land.

== Demographics ==
Historical population
Census	Pop.	Note	%±
1910	207		—
1940	241		—
1950	234		−2.9%
1960	155		−33.8%
1970	230		48.4%
1980	257		11.7%
1990	264		2.7%
2000	261		−1.1%
2010	266		1.9%
2020	211		−20.7%
U.S. Decennial Census

As of the census of 2000, there were 261 people, 73 households, and 48 families residing in the town. In 2020, its population declined to 211.

== Notable people ==
- Shakir, Qadriyyah Buteen; former name Lola Buteen (Burke) Wiggins (1932-2000)

== See also ==
- List of municipalities in Georgia (U.S. state)
