= Mitchell J. Green Plantation =

Historic plantation in Evans County, Georgia

- U.S. National Register of Historic Places
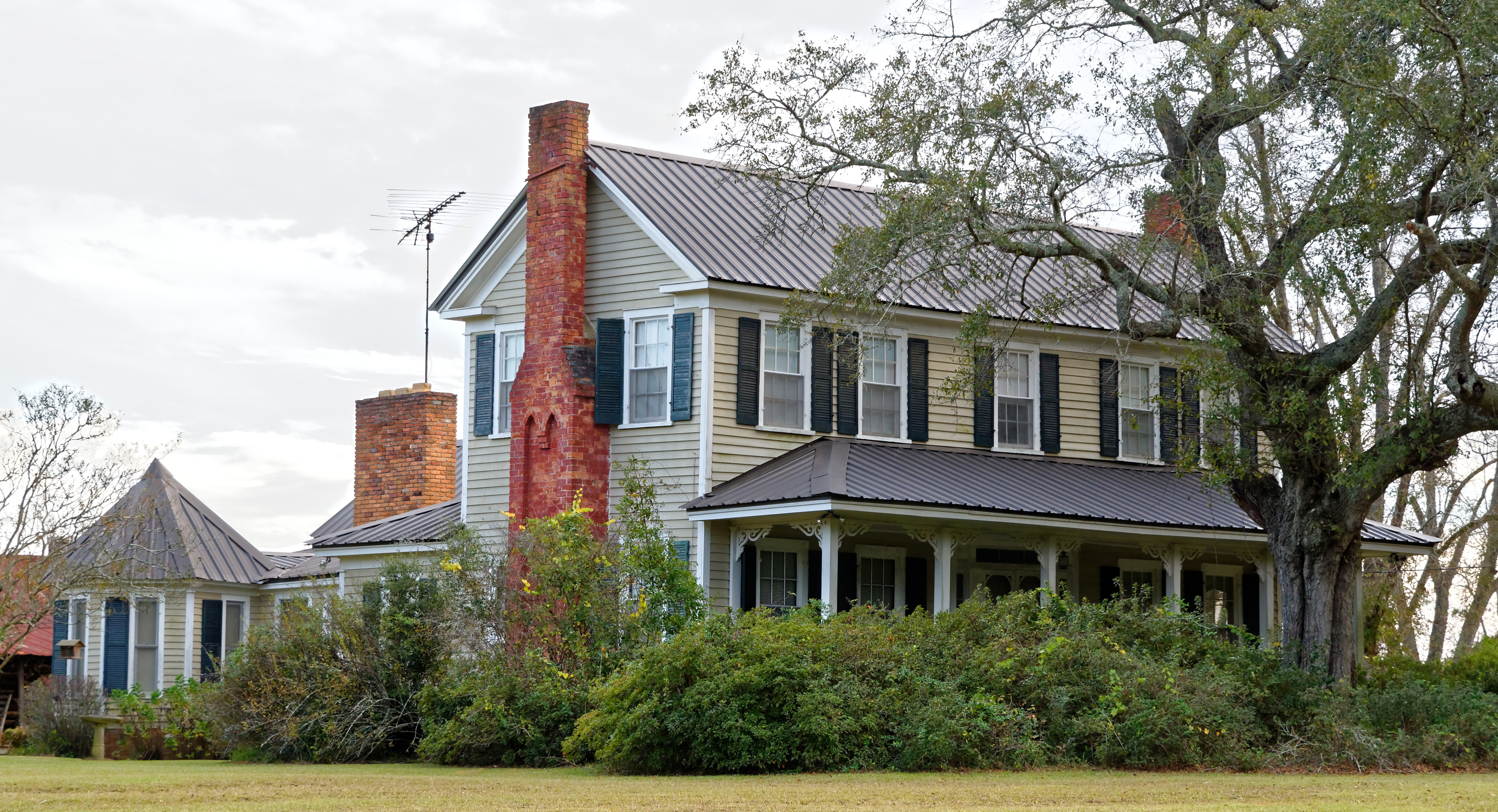

- Location within Georgia
- Nearest city: Claxton, Georgia
- Coordinates: 32°14′54″N 81°52′17″W
- Area: 433 acres (175 ha)
- Built: 1868, 1878
- Architectural style: Plantation Plain
- NRHP reference No.: 80001019
- Added to NRHP: April 9, 1980

The Mitchell J. Green Plantation is a 19th-century plantation and was listed on the National Register of Historic Places in 1980. Also known as the Cottonham Plantation, it is located off U.S. Route 301 and Georgia State Route 169, about 8 miles (13 km) northeast of Claxton in Evans County, Georgia.

== Structures ==
The listing for the Mitchell J. Green Plantation includes eight contributing buildings and five contributing structures. The plantation's main house is a two-story Plantation Plain house built in 1878. The property also includes a log cabin built in 1868, a syrup house (which produced molasses), some corn cribs, a tobacco barn, a commissary (which sold goods to the tenants), a smokehouse, and some tenant houses on about 433 acres (1.75 km^{2}).

The log cabin provided shelter for the Green family while they began to establish their plantation and, after several years of successful farming, they built the larger plantation house. Agricultural records and surviving agricultural buildings indicate that the Green family operated a rather self-sufficient plantation. The syrup house produced molasses for the plantation, while the smokehouse cured meat for the Green family. The commissary sold supplies to the tenant families.

== Significance ==
The Mitchell J. Green Plantation was deemed significant as a preserved example of a "typical post-Civil War plantation" in its nomination for National Register of Historic Places listing. Namely, the plantation's structures form an agricultural complex that is typical of the Southeast Georgia plantation after the Civil War. This is because the distribution of farm buildings on the Mitchell J. Green Plantation is different from the distribution on a pre-Civil War plantation, since this plantation's structures remain in such close proximity to each other. While it was not uncommon to build the necessary agricultural outbuildings near the plantation house, what distinguishes the Mitchell J. Green Plantation from other post-Civil War plantations is the relatively good condition of its structures.
