= Gordon Springs (Georgia) =

Coordinates: 34°45′23″N 85°08′10″W

Gordon Springs is a spring and its associated settlement in Whitfield County, Georgia, near the city of Dalton. In the 19th century, George Washington Gordon and his brother, the Reverend Zachariah Gordon, operated a summer resort there.

Gordon Spring Creek flows out of it into Chickamauga Creek.
