= Candler County, Georgia =

County in Georgia, United States

- County
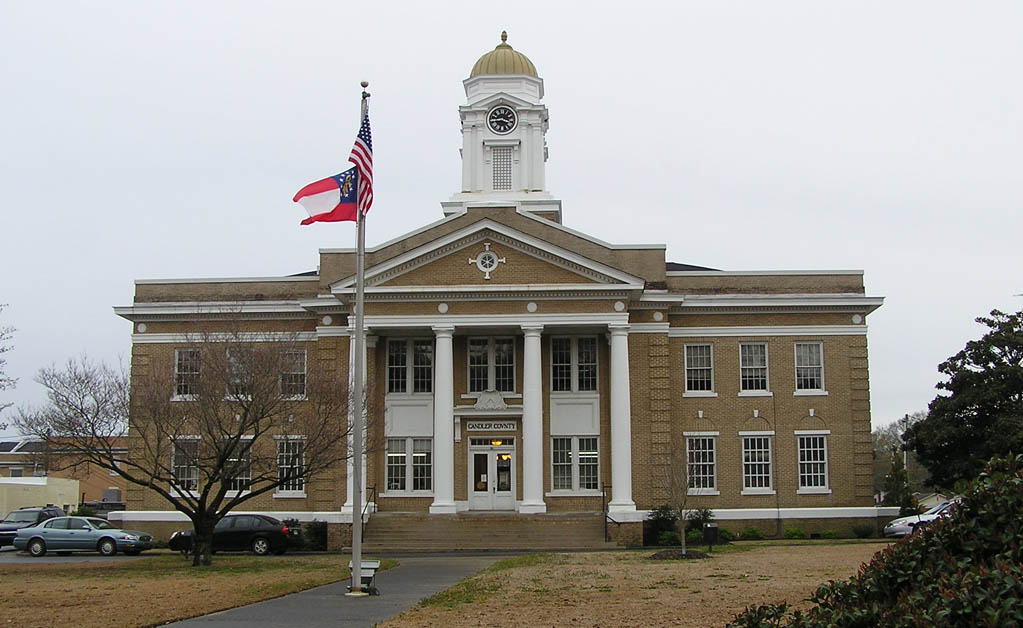
- Candler County Courthouse, in Metter

- Logo

- Location within the U.S. state of Georgia
- Coordinates: 32°24′N 82°04′W
- Country: United States
- State: Georgia
- Founded: 1914; 112 years ago
- Named for: Allen D. Candler
- Seat: Metter
- Largest city: Metter

Area
  - Total: 249 sq mi (640 km^{2})
  - Land: 243 sq mi (630 km^{2})
  - Water: 5.8 sq mi (15 km^{2}) 2.3%

Population (2020)
  - Total: 10,981
  - Estimate (2025): 11,275 ▲
  - Density: 45/sq mi (17/km^{2})
- Time zone: UTC−5 (Eastern)
  - Summer (DST): UTC−4 (EDT)
- Congressional district: 12th
- Website: metter-candler.com

Candler County is a county located in the southeastern part of the U.S. state of Georgia. As of the 2020 census, the population was 10,981. The county seat is Metter. The county was founded in 1914 and named for Allen D. Candler, the 56th governor of Georgia.

== Geography ==
According to the U.S. Census Bureau, the county has a total area of 249 square miles (640 km^{2}), of which 243 square miles (630 km^{2}) is land and 5.8 square miles (15 km^{2}) (2.3%) is water.

The majority of Candler County is located in the Canoochee River sub-basin of the Ogeechee River basin. The western edge of the county, west of State Route 57, is located in the Ohoopee River sub-basin of the Altamaha River basin.

=== Major highways ===
- I-16 / SR 404 (unsigned)
- SR 23
- SR 26
- SR 46
- SR 57
- SR 121
- SR 129

=== Adjacent counties ===
- Bulloch County (east)
- Evans County (southeast)
- Tattnall County (south)
- Emanuel County (northwest)

== Communities ==
=== City ===
- Metter (county seat)

=== Town ===
- Pulaski

== Demographics ==
Historical population
Census	Pop.	Note	%±
1920	9,228		—
1930	8,991		−2.6%
1940	9,103		1.2%
1950	8,063		−11.4%
1960	6,672		−17.3%
1970	6,412		−3.9%
1980	7,518		17.2%
1990	7,744		3.0%
2000	9,577		23.7%
2010	10,998		14.8%
2020	10,981		−0.2%
2025 (est.)	11,275	▲	2.7%
U.S. Decennial Census; 1790-1880 1890-1910; 1920-1930 1930-1940; 1940-1950 1960-1980; 1980-2000 2010

=== Racial and ethnic composition ===
Candler County, Georgia – Racial and ethnic composition Note: the US Census treats Hispanic/Latino as an ethnic category. This table excludes Latinos from the racial categories and assigns them to a separate category. Hispanics/Latinos may be of any race.
Race / Ethnicity (NH = Non-Hispanic)	Pop 1980	Pop 1990	Pop 2000	Pop 2010	Pop 2020	% 1980	% 1990	% 2000	% 2010	% 2020
White alone (NH)	5,048	5,187	6,028	6,949	6,567	67.15%	66.98%	62.94%	63.18%	59.80%
Black or African American alone (NH)	2,359	2,403	2,576	2,669	2,681	31.38%	31.03%	26.90%	24.27%	24.41%
Native American or Alaska Native alone (NH)	6	7	12	8	19	0.08%	0.09%	0.13%	0.07%	0.17%
Asian alone (NH)	13	9	26	57	63	0.17%	0.12%	0.27%	0.52%	0.57%
Native Hawaiian or Pacific Islander alone (NH)	x	x	3	1	3	x	x	0.03%	0.01%	0.03%
Other race alone (NH)	0	0	2	11	26	0.00%	0.00%	0.02%	0.10%	0.24%
Mixed race or Multiracial (NH)	x	x	48	76	244	x	x	0.50%	0.69%	2.22%
Hispanic or Latino (any race)	92	138	882	1,227	1,378	1.22%	1.78%	9.21%	11.16%	12.55%
Total	7,518	7,744	9,577	10,998	10,981	100.00%	100.00%	100.00%	100.00%	100.00%

=== 2020 census ===
As of the 2020 census, there were 10,981 people, 4,116 households, and 2,775 families living in the county.

Of the residents, 25.0% were under the age of 18 and 19.3% were 65 years of age or older; the median age was 40.8 years. For every 100 females there were 96.4 males, and for every 100 females age 18 and over there were 92.1 males. 0.0% of residents lived in urban areas and 100.0% lived in rural areas.

The racial makeup of the county was 61.6% White, 24.5% Black or African American, 0.3% American Indian and Alaska Native, 0.6% Asian, 0.0% Native Hawaiian and Pacific Islander, 7.4% from some other race, and 5.5% from two or more races. Hispanic or Latino residents of any race comprised 12.5% of the population.

There were 4,116 households in the county, of which 33.0% had children under the age of 18 living with them and 29.7% had a female householder with no spouse or partner present. About 26.8% of all households were made up of individuals and 12.6% had someone living alone who was 65 years of age or older.

There were 4,629 housing units, of which 11.1% were vacant. Among occupied housing units, 65.7% were owner-occupied and 34.3% were renter-occupied. The homeowner vacancy rate was 0.6% and the rental vacancy rate was 7.3%.

== Politics ==
As of the 2020s, Candler County is a Republican stronghold, voting 73% for Donald Trump in 2024. For elections to the United States House of Representatives, Candler County is part of Georgia's 12th congressional district, currently represented by Rick Allen. For elections to the Georgia State Senate, Candler County is part of District 4. For elections to the Georgia House of Representatives, Candler County is part of district 158.

United States presidential election results for Candler County, Georgia
Year	Republican		Democratic		Third party(ies)	
Year	No.	%	No.	%	No.	%
1912	104	18.81%	443	80.11%	6	1.08%
1916	28	5.96%	442	94.04%	0	0.00%
1920	68	9.18%	673	90.82%	0	0.00%
1924	14	5.20%	241	89.59%	14	5.20%
1928	133	24.45%	411	75.55%	0	0.00%
1932	13	2.65%	476	97.14%	1	0.20%
1936	80	7.44%	992	92.28%	3	0.28%
1940	63	7.75%	748	92.00%	2	0.25%
1944	138	17.45%	653	82.55%	0	0.00%
1948	125	12.41%	589	58.49%	293	29.10%
1952	422	22.57%	1,448	77.43%	0	0.00%
1956	308	23.62%	996	76.38%	0	0.00%
1960	433	31.47%	943	68.53%	0	0.00%
1964	1,710	68.26%	795	31.74%	0	0.00%
1968	552	19.98%	587	21.25%	1,624	58.78%
1972	1,427	85.71%	238	14.29%	0	0.00%
1976	646	31.76%	1,388	68.24%	0	0.00%
1980	1,030	42.54%	1,358	56.09%	33	1.36%
1984	1,497	59.62%	1,014	40.38%	0	0.00%
1988	1,261	58.82%	877	40.90%	6	0.28%
1992	1,014	36.81%	1,192	43.27%	549	19.93%
1996	1,131	45.22%	1,097	43.86%	273	10.92%
2000	1,643	60.36%	1,053	38.68%	26	0.96%
2004	2,048	64.91%	1,096	34.74%	11	0.35%
2008	2,286	64.91%	1,209	34.33%	27	0.77%
2012	2,344	66.38%	1,157	32.77%	30	0.85%
2016	2,664	70.79%	1,026	27.27%	73	1.94%
2020	3,133	70.71%	1,269	28.64%	29	0.65%
2024	3,366	73.69%	1,196	26.18%	6	0.13%

United States Senate election results for Candler County, Georgia2
Year	Republican		Democratic		Third party(ies)	
Year	No.	%	No.	%	No.	%
2020	3,077	70.41%	1,233	28.22%	60	1.37%
2020	2,781	71.03%	1,134	28.97%	0	0.00%

United States Senate election results for Candler County, Georgia3
Year	Republican		Democratic		Third party(ies)	
Year	No.	%	No.	%	No.	%
2020	1,555	35.98%	778	18.00%	1,989	46.02%
2020	2,787	71.13%	1,131	28.87%	0	0.00%
2022	2,552	72.27%	950	26.90%	29	0.82%
2022	2,341	71.35%	940	28.65%	0	0.00%

Georgia Gubernatorial election results for Candler County
Year	Republican		Democratic		Third party(ies)	
Year	No.	%	No.	%	No.	%
2022	2,666	74.85%	885	24.85%	11	0.31%

== See also ==
- National Register of Historic Places listings in Candler County, Georgia
