= Metter, Georgia =

- City
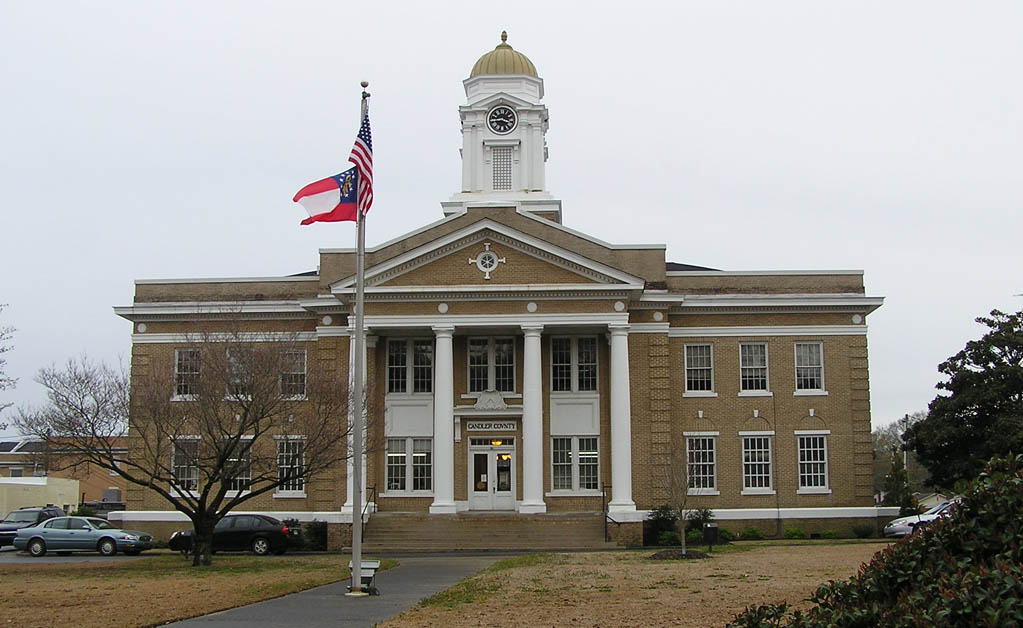

- Logo

- Location in Candler County and the state of Georgia
- Coordinates: 32°23′47″N 82°3′45″W
- Country: United States
- State: Georgia
- County: Candler

Government
  - Mayor: Ed Boyd

Area
  - Total: 7.68 sq mi (19.90 km^{2})
  - Land: 7.50 sq mi (19.42 km^{2})
  - Water: 0.19 sq mi (0.48 km^{2})
- Elevation: 220 ft (67 m)

Population (2020)
  - Total: 4,004
  - Density: 534.0/sq mi (206.18/km^{2})
- Time zone: UTC-5 (EST)
  - Summer (DST): UTC-4 (EDT)
- ZIP code: 30439
- Area code: 912
- FIPS code: 13-51072
- GNIS feature ID: 0318060
- Website: www.metter-candler.com

Metter is a city in and the county seat of Candler County, Georgia, United States. The population was 4,130 at the 2010 census. In 2020, its population was 4,004. The city is halfway between Macon and Savannah on Interstate 16.

== History ==
Metter was founded in 1889. In 1914, Metter was designated seat of the newly formed Candler County. Metter was incorporated as a town in 1903 and as a city in 1920.

== Geography ==
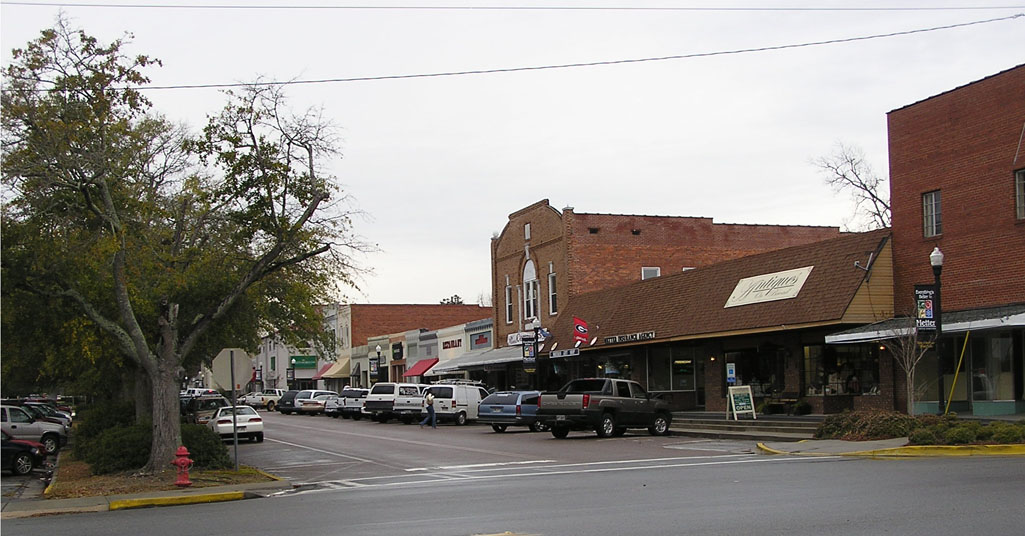
Downtown view of Metter. A tree-shaded park is to the left.

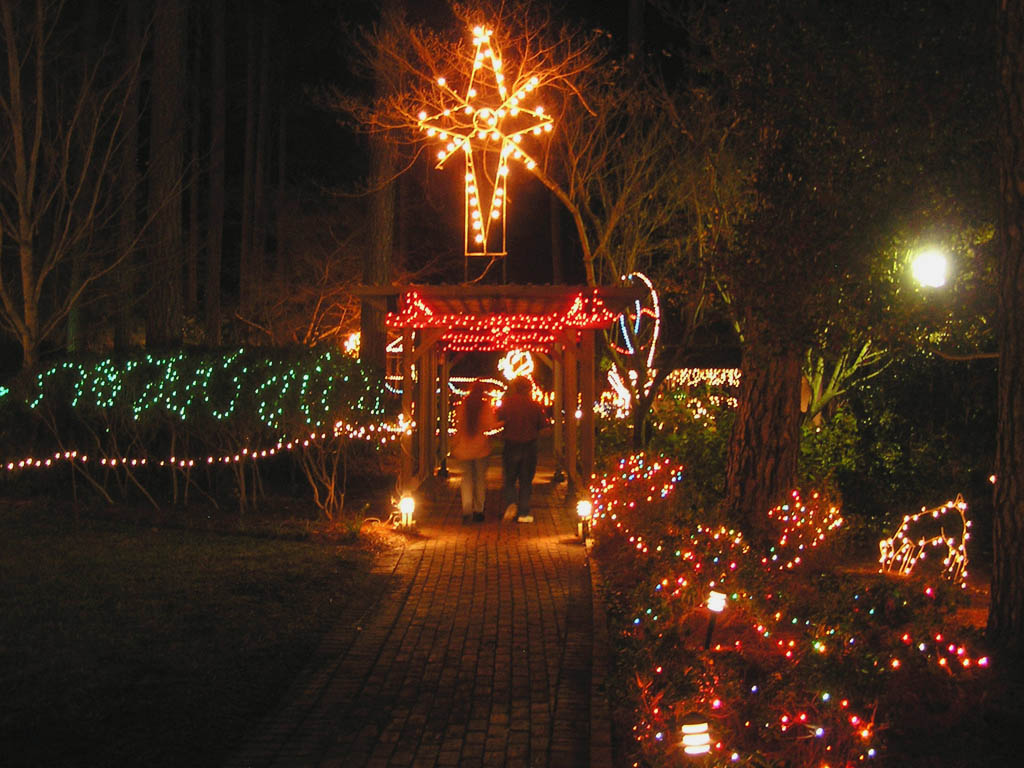
Part of the Christmas display at Guido Gardens

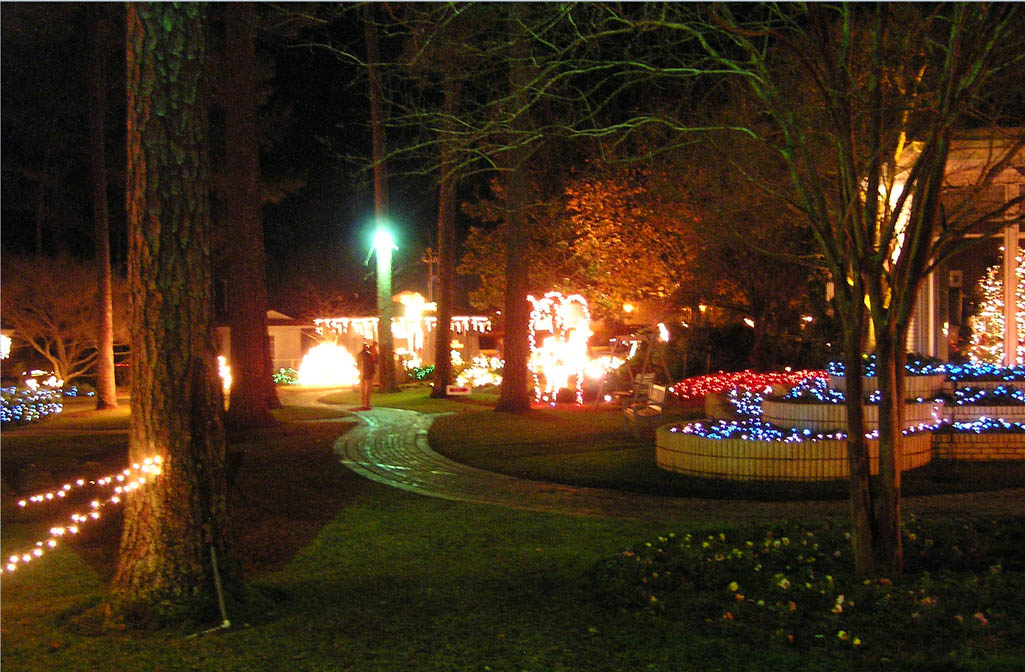
Part of the Christmas display at Guido Gardens looking towards the parking lot from inside the grounds

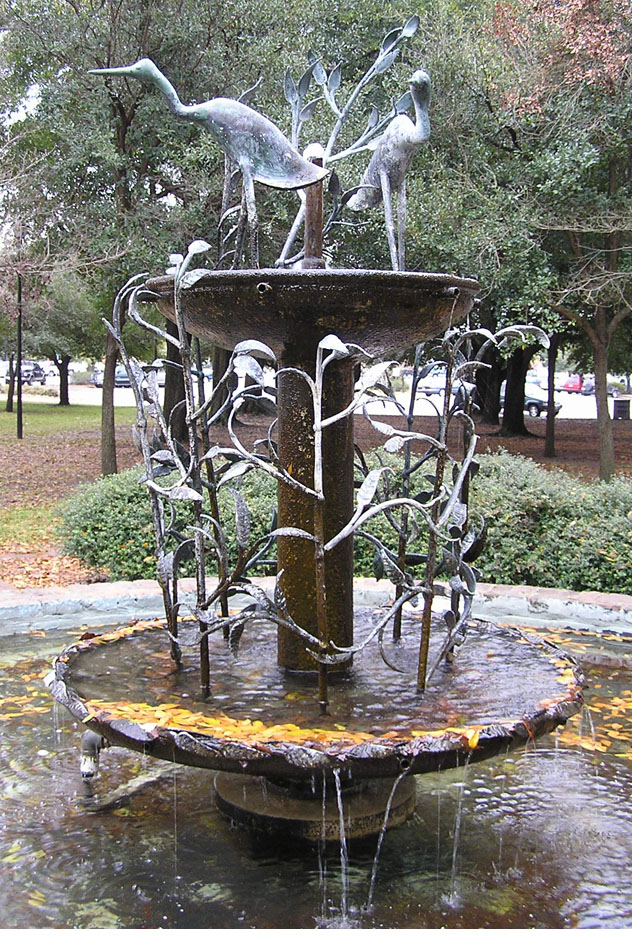
A metalwork fountain of herons located in the tree-shaded park downtown

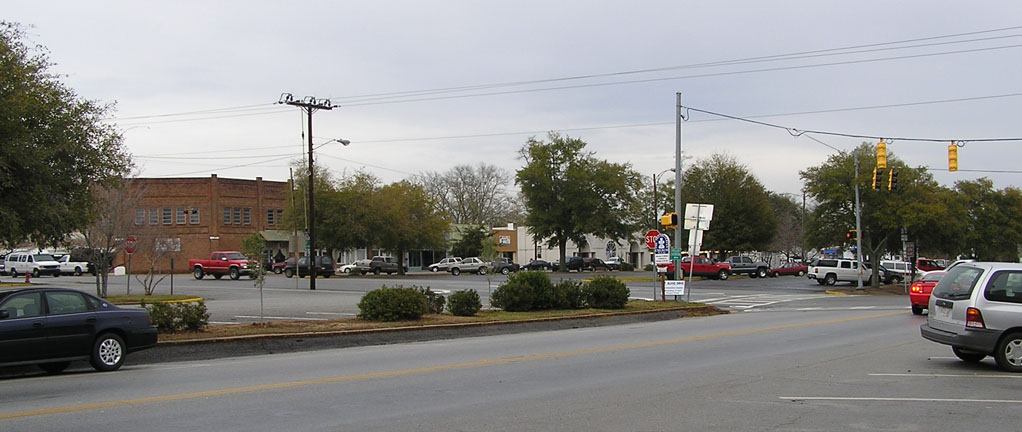
A view across the central, downtown parking area

Metter is located near the center of Candler County at 32°23′47″N 82°03′45″W, in eastern Georgia. Interstate 16 touches the southern edge of the city, leading east 63 miles (101 km) to Savannah, and west 102 miles (164 km) to Macon. A short, tree-lined parkway leads from I-16 to the downtown area.

According to the United States Census Bureau, Metter has a total area of 7.9 square miles (20.4 km^{2}), of which 7.7 square miles (19.9 km^{2}) is land and 0.19 square miles (0.5 km^{2}), or 2.53%, is water.

Longtime residents use the slogan "Everything's Better in Metter".

Metter may be best known as the home of "The Sower", Michael Guido, who delivered short evangelical PSAs on late-night television nationwide for decades. Dr. Guido's messages were filmed at Guido Gardens, which houses a public botanical garden and a school of ministry. Guido died at the age of 94 on February 22, 2009. His messages were aired on TV stations in the Georgia and South Carolina region.

A prominent event in Metter is Another Bloomin' Festival, an arts and crafts festival held the day before Easter. The festival draws thousands of out-of-town residents, who come to enjoy homemade desserts, barbecue, and crafts. In addition, it serves as a homecoming celebration for former residents who have returned to celebrate the holiday with their families.

=== Climate ===
Climate data for Metter, Georgia, 1991–2020 normals, extremes 2003–present
Month	Jan	Feb	Mar	Apr	May	Jun	Jul	Aug	Sep	Oct	Nov	Dec	Year
Record high °F (°C)	82 (28)	85 (29)	89 (32)	94 (34)	101 (38)	104 (40)	102 (39)	104 (40)	100 (38)	99 (37)	87 (31)	84 (29)	104 (40)
Mean maximum °F (°C)	76.1 (24.5)	79.7 (26.5)	84.7 (29.3)	89.7 (32.1)	94.7 (34.8)	98.9 (37.2)	99.0 (37.2)	98.5 (36.9)	95.1 (35.1)	90.3 (32.4)	82.3 (27.9)	79.0 (26.1)	100.3 (37.9)
Mean daily maximum °F (°C)	60.1 (15.6)	64.6 (18.1)	71.1 (21.7)	78.0 (25.6)	85.6 (29.8)	90.5 (32.5)	92.3 (33.5)	91.2 (32.9)	86.4 (30.2)	78.4 (25.8)	69.2 (20.7)	62.7 (17.1)	77.5 (25.3)
Daily mean °F (°C)	49.6 (9.8)	53.4 (11.9)	59.5 (15.3)	66.0 (18.9)	74.3 (23.5)	80.1 (26.7)	82.5 (28.1)	81.8 (27.7)	77.1 (25.1)	67.5 (19.7)	57.9 (14.4)	52.0 (11.1)	66.8 (19.3)
Mean daily minimum °F (°C)	39.1 (3.9)	42.1 (5.6)	47.9 (8.8)	54.0 (12.2)	62.9 (17.2)	69.7 (20.9)	72.6 (22.6)	72.5 (22.5)	67.8 (19.9)	56.6 (13.7)	46.5 (8.1)	41.3 (5.2)	56.1 (13.4)
Mean minimum °F (°C)	22.5 (−5.3)	26.3 (−3.2)	30.2 (−1.0)	39.1 (3.9)	48.4 (9.1)	63.1 (17.3)	66.1 (18.9)	65.5 (18.6)	55.7 (13.2)	40.5 (4.7)	28.7 (−1.8)	26.3 (−3.2)	20.7 (−6.3)
Record low °F (°C)	15 (−9)	18 (−8)	23 (−5)	28 (−2)	45 (7)	58 (14)	60 (16)	61 (16)	47 (8)	33 (1)	21 (−6)	16 (−9)	15 (−9)
Average precipitation inches (mm)	4.06 (103)	3.77 (96)	4.28 (109)	2.84 (72)	3.44 (87)	4.92 (125)	5.61 (142)	4.76 (121)	3.53 (90)	2.74 (70)	3.03 (77)	4.26 (108)	47.24 (1,200)
Average snowfall inches (cm)	0.1 (0.25)	0.0 (0.0)	0.0 (0.0)	0.0 (0.0)	0.0 (0.0)	0.0 (0.0)	0.0 (0.0)	0.0 (0.0)	0.0 (0.0)	0.0 (0.0)	0.0 (0.0)	0.1 (0.25)	0.2 (0.5)
Average precipitation days (≥ 0.01 in)	9.2	8.4	9.2	8.2	8.9	9.4	11.7	11.1	7.9	6.9	5.6	8.3	104.8
Average snowy days (≥ 0.1 in)	0.1	0.0	0.0	0.0	0.0	0.0	0.0	0.0	0.0	0.0	0.0	0.1	0.2
Source 1: NOAA (snow/snow days 1981–2010)
Source 2: National Weather Service (mean maxima/minima 2006–2020)

== Demographics ==
Historical population
Census	Pop.	Note	%±
1900	213		—
1910	408		91.5%
1920	908		122.5%
1930	1,424		56.8%
1940	1,823		28.0%
1950	2,091		14.7%
1960	2,362		13.0%
1970	2,912		23.3%
1980	3,531		21.3%
1990	3,707		5.0%
2000	3,879		4.6%
2010	4,130		6.5%
2020	4,004		−3.1%
U.S. Decennial Census

=== 2020 census ===
As of the 2020 census, Metter had a population of 4,004. The median age was 39.9 years. 26.3% of residents were under the age of 18 and 19.8% of residents were 65 years of age or older. For every 100 females there were 87.2 males, and for every 100 females age 18 and over there were 81.8 males age 18 and over.

0.0% of residents lived in urban areas, while 100.0% lived in rural areas.

There were 1,522 households in Metter, of which 35.0% had children under the age of 18 living in them. Of all households, 36.4% were married-couple households, 17.8% were households with a male householder and no spouse or partner present, and 40.3% were households with a female householder and no spouse or partner present. About 29.7% of all households were made up of individuals, 14.4% had someone living alone who was 65 years of age or older, and there were 1,018 families residing in the city.

There were 1,710 housing units, of which 11.0% were vacant. The homeowner vacancy rate was 0.9% and the rental vacancy rate was 8.2%.

Metter racial composition as of 2020
Race	Num.	Perc.
White (non-Hispanic)	1,865	46.58%
Black or African American (non-Hispanic)	1,553	38.79%
Native American	6	0.15%
Asian	47	1.17%
Pacific Islander	2	0.05%
Other/Mixed	113	2.82%
Hispanic or Latino	418	10.44%

== Education ==
=== Candler County School District ===
The Candler County School District holds pre-kindergarten to grade twelve, and consists of an elementary school, a middle school and a high school. The district has 117 full-time teachers and over 1,930 students.

==== Elementary schools ====
- Metter Elementary School

==== Middle school ====
- Metter Middle School

==== High school ====
- Metter High School

== Notable people ==
- LaVon Mercer (born 1959), American-Israeli basketball player
