= Georgia State Route 19 =

State highway in central Georgia

State Route 19
- Georgia State Route 19 highlighted in red

Route information
- Maintained by GDOT
- Length: 151.74 mi (244.20 km)
- Existed: 1919–present

Major junctions
- South end: US 1 / US 23 / SR 4 north of Alma
- US 221 / US 341 / SR 27 / SR 135 in Hazlehurst; US 23 / US 341 / SR 27 Lumber City; US 280 / SR 30 in Glenwood; I-16 in Dublin; I-75 in Macon; I-475 northwest of Bolingbroke
- North end: US 41 / SR 18 in Forsyth

Location
- Country: United States
- State: Georgia
- Counties: Bacon, Jeff Davis, Appling, Telfair, Wheeler, Laurens, Twiggs, Bibb, Monroe

Highway system
- Georgia State Highway System; Interstate; US; State; Special
← US 19	→ I-20

State Route 19 (SR 19) is a 151.74-mile-long (244.20 km) state highway that travels southeast-to-northwest through portions of Bacon, Jeff Davis, Appling, Telfair, Wheeler, Laurens, Twiggs, Bibb, and Monroe counties in the central part of the U.S. state of Georgia. The highway travels from its southern terminus at US 1/US 23/SR 4 north of Alma to its northern terminus at US 41/SR 18 in Forsyth. It also travels through Hazlehurst, Lumber City, Dublin, and Macon.

The brief portion, from US 80 to US 23/US 80/US 129 Alt./SR 87 in Macon-Bibb County, is part of the Fall Line Freeway, a highway that connects Columbus and Augusta. It may eventually be incorporated into the proposed eastern extension of Interstate 14 (I-14).

== Route description ==
SR 19 begins at an intersection with US 1/SR 4 north of Alma. The route travels north, concurrent with US 23, which is also concurrent with US 1/SR 4 south of here. Throughout much of this segment, US 23/SR 19 has standard rural Georgia surroundings, with its mix of wooded areas and local farmland. These routes also cross the Bacon-Appling County line before an intersection with Pine Level Church Road, then crosses the Jeff Davis County Line. North of the intersection with County Farm Road it heads back across the Appling County line, and returns to the Jeff Davis County line at the intersection of Ira Graham/Zora Road. Later they cross a bridge over the Little Satilla Creek, and after three more intersections with rural dirt roads encounters another bridge over the Big Satilla Creek and enters the community of Satilla. No major intersections exist within this community, and very few other paved roads exist. Nearing Hazlehurst, the routes brushes by a dirt road that used to be an old segment of Alma Highway before the continuing into the southern terminus of US 23 Bus./SR 135 Conn., while US 23/SR 19 turns right onto Larry Contos Boulevard, taking part of US 221 Truck/SR 135 Truck with it. The first intersection along this segment is that same former Alma Highway section, which is named "Old Alma Road" on the left side, and Davis Street on the right. From there, it passes by a power plant on the west side. The route officially enters the Hazlehurst City Limits between Currie Street and a railroad crossing for a former Southern Railway line (now the Norfolk Southern Railway's Brunswick District). Larry Contos Boulevard ends at US 341/SR 27 (a divided four-lane highway Designated the Golden Isles Parkway), and US 23/SR 19 turns northwest along this route. The first notable site along this segment is the combined Hazlehurst Fire Department and the Hazlehurst — Jeff Davis County Chamber of Commerce building on the northeast corner of Oak Street. Two block later, it crosses another railroad line just east of Walnut Street. Two blocks after this, it intersects with northbound US 221, and the truck routes for US 221/SR 135 officially comes to an end. US 23/US 341 and northbound US 221 travel for one block until the highways curve to the north at East Coffee (SR 19 Conn.) and West Jamar Streets, and northbound US 221 finally joins the southbound road once again at North Tallahassee Street, while southbound US 221 continues southbound along South Tallahassee Street.

The highways enter Telfair County by traveling over the Dr. C. R. Youmans Memorial Bridge over the Ocmulgee River where it enters Lumber City. SR 19 departs to the north at Victory Boulevard, leaving the US 23/US 341/SR 27 concurrency. From there, it crosses the Little Ocmulgee River, and begins to parallel the Oconee River to the north. In Jordan, SR 19 encounters the eastern termini of both former SR 134 and still existing SR 126 merely feet away from one another. In Glenwood the street name changes to Second Street and intersects US 280/SR 30 which is named Second Avenue. North of there, it resumes its rural characteristics and has an intersection with SR 46 and later the first of many interchanges with Interstate 16 (I-16), this one specifically at exit 54. In Dublin, SR 19 briefly travels concurrent with US 441 then turns west to join US 80/SR 26. The three highways travel northwest. In East Macon, SR 19 becomes concurrent with US 23 again, this time in another concurrency with SR 87. Later, in Macon, SR 19 leaves US 80/SR 87, and at exit 1A, on I-16 turns south on a wrong-way concurrency with US 129/SR 49. After crossing the Spring Street Bridge over the Ocmulgee River, US 23 turns northwest and US 129 turns southeast at Riverside Drive. Two blocks later, the wrong-way concurrency with SR 49 ends at Walnut Street and is replaced by a concurrency with US 41 Bus., and then, after a split-diamond interchange with I-75/SR 540, joins US 41. The highways travel north to Forsyth, where SR 18 travels concurrent with US 41, and SR 19 meets its northern terminus.

The following portions of SR 19, that are concurrent with U.S. Highways, are the only segments that are part of the National Highway System, a system of routes determined to be the most important for the nation's economy, mobility, and defense:

- The segment concurrent with US 23/US 341/SR 27 from Hazlehurst to Lumber City
- The segment concurrent with US 80/SR 26 from Dublin to the intersection with US 441 Byp./SR 117 west of the city
- The segment from SR 87 Conn. in East Macon to just northwest of an intersection with Zebulon Road, which is just northwest of Macon

== History ==
SR 19 was established at least as early as 1919 from Glenwood to Barnesville. At this time, SR 15 was established on most of SR 19's current path south of Glenwood, but on a direct path from SR 32 in Alma. By the end of September 1921, the path of SR 15 between Glenwood and Wrightsville was shifted westward, replacing the path of SR 19 between Glenwood and Dublin. By October 1926, US 80 was designated on SR 19 from Dublin to Macon. US 41 was designated on SR 19 from Macon to Barnesville. US 341 was designated on SR 15/SR 27 from Hazlehurst to Lumber City. The path of SR 15 between Alma and Hazlehurst was rerouted. SR 15 and SR 32 traveled north-northeast from Alma and then split just north of the Bacon–Appling county line. Between September 1938 and July 1939, the northern terminus of SR 19 was truncated to just southeast of Forsyth, with SR 18 extended onto this former segment. At the end of 1940, US 129 was designated on the segment of SR 19 from east of Macon into the city. Between April 1949 and August 1950, US 23 was designated on two segments of SR 19: from north of Alma to Lumber City and from east of Macon to southeast of Forsyth. By the beginning of 1952, the entire current length of SR 19 was hard surfaced. Between July 1957 and June 1960, the path of SR 15 from north of Alma to Dublin was shifted eastward, with SR 19 extended onto the former path. Between June 1963 and the beginning of 1966, the path of US 41 in Macon was shifted westward. Its former path, which its northern part was concurrent with US 23 and SR 19, was redesignated as US 41 Bus. In 1971, the path of US 23, from Macon to southeast of Forsyth, was shifted eastward, off of US 41/SR 19 and onto SR 87.

In 1998, the Georgia state legislature passed a resolution designating a portion of SR 19 in Macon as "Duane Allman Boulevard" and a bridge thereon as the "Raymond Berry Oakley III Bridge" in honor and remembrance of Duane Allman and Berry Oakley, late founding members of The Allman Brothers Band.

== Major intersections ==
County	Location	mi	km	Destinations	Notes
Bacon		0.000	0.000	US 1 / SR 4 / US 23 south – Alma, Waycross, Baxley, Lyons	Southern terminus; southern end of US 23 concurrency
Appling	No major junctions				
Jeff Davis	No major junctions				
Appling	No major junctions				
Jeff Davis		17.633	28.378	US 221 Truck begins / SR 135 Truck begins / SR 135 Conn. north (Jefferson Street)	Southern end of US 221 Truck/SR 135 Truck concurrency; southern terminus of US 221 Truck, SR 135 Conn., and SR 135 Truck
Jeff Davis	Hazlehurst	18.515	29.797	US 341 south / SR 27 east (Jarman Street) – Graham, Baxley, Jesup	Southern end of US 341/SR 27 concurrency
Jeff Davis	Hazlehurst	18.908	30.429	US 221 north / SR 135 north (Cromartie Street) / US 221 Truck ends / SR 135 Truck ends – Douglas	Northern end of US 221 Truck/SR 135 Truck concurrency; northern terminus of US 221 Truck/SR 135 Truck; southern end of US 221/SR 135 concurrency (northbound lanes only)
Jeff Davis	Hazlehurst	18.988	30.558	SR 19 Conn. south (East Coffee Street)	Northern terminus of SR 19 Conn.
Jeff Davis	Hazlehurst	19.143	30.808	US 221 north / SR 135 north (Tallahassee Street) – Uvalda	Northern end of US 221/SR 135 concurrency (northbound lanes only)
Telfair	Lumber City	26.050	41.923	US 23 north / US 341 north / SR 27 west (Golden Isles Highway) – McRae	Northern end of US 23 and US 341/SR 27 concurrencies
Wheeler	Jordan	34.669	55.794	SR 126 west / Springhill Church Road west – Alamo	Eastern terminus of SR 126; Springhill Church Road is former SR 134 west
Wheeler	Glenwood	45.169	72.692	US 280 / SR 30 (2nd Avenue) – Alamo, Mount Vernon, Brewton–Parker College	
Wheeler		52.563	84.592	SR 46 – Eastman, Soperton	
Laurens		71.363	114.848	I-16 (Jim L. Gillis Historic Savannah Parkway / SR 404) – Macon, Savannah	I-16/SR 404 exit 54; diamond interchange
Laurens	Dublin	75.021	120.735	US 319 / SR 31 / US 441 south (Martin Luther King Jr Boulevard) – McRae, Douglas	Southern end of US 441 concurrency
Laurens	Dublin	75.208	121.036	US 80 east / SR 26 east / SR 29 south (East Jackson Street) / US 441 north (North Jefferson Street) – Wrightsville, Swainsboro, Irwinton	Northern end of US 441 concurrency; southern end of US 80 and SR 26 concurrencies
Laurens		79.777	128.389	US 441 Byp. / SR 117 – McRae	
Laurens	Dudley	85.326	137.319	SR 338 (Second Street) to I-16 (SR 404) – Dexter, Irwinton	
Laurens		88.085	141.759	SR 26 west to I-16 (SR 404) – Cochran	Northern end of SR 26 concurrency
Laurens	Montrose	90.986	146.428	SR 278 west – Cochran	Eastern terminus of SR 278
Wilkinson	Allentown	95.294	153.361	SR 112 (Main Street) to I-16 (SR 404) – Cochran, Irwinton	
Twiggs		98.149	157.956	SR 358 west to I-16 (SR 404) – Fort Valley	Eastern terminus of SR 358
Twiggs	Jeffersonville	105.350	169.544	SR 96 east (North Church Street) – Irwinton	Southern end of SR 96 concurrency
Twiggs	Jeffersonville	105.539	169.849	SR 18 west / SR 96 west (Magnolia Street) to I-16 (SR 404) – Gordon, Gray, Tarversville, Fort Valley	Northern end of SR 96 concurrency; eastern terminus of SR 18
Bibb	Macon	123.332	198.484	SR 57 east (Irwinton Road) / SR 540 east (Fall Line Freeway east) – Gordon	Southern end of SR 540 concurrency; western terminus of SR 57
Bibb	Macon	124.639	200.587	SR 87 Conn. south (Ocmulgee East Boulevard) – Cochran	Northern terminus of SR 87 Conn.
Bibb	Macon	124.972	201.123	US 23 south / US 129 Alt. south / SR 87 south (Emery Highway) – Jeffersonville, Griswoldville Battlefield	Southern end of US 23, US 129 Alt., and SR 87 concurrencies
Bibb	Macon	127.242	204.776	US 80 west / SR 87 north (Coliseum Drive) / SR 540 west (Fall Line Freeway west) to I-16 (SR 404)	Northern end of US 80, SR 87, and SR 540 concurrencies
Bibb	Macon	127.507	205.203	US 129 Alt. north / SR 22 (Second Street) – Columbus, Gray	Northern end of US 129 Alt. concurrency
Bibb	Macon	127.807	205.685	US 129 north / SR 11 north / SR 49 north (North Avenue)	Southern end of US 129/SR 11/SR 49 concurrency
Bibb	Macon	127.876	205.796	I-16 (Jim L. Gillis Historic Savannah Parkway / SR 404) / SR 540 (Fall Line Freeway) – Atlanta, Savannah	I-16/SR 404 exit 1A
Bibb	Macon	128.014	206.019	W.L. "Young" Stribling Memorial Bridge	Crossing of the Ocmulgee River
Bibb	Macon	128.230	206.366	US 23 north / US 129 south / SR 11 south / SR 87 (Riverside Drive)	Northern end of US 23 and US 129/SR 11 concurrencies
Bibb	Macon	128.338	206.540	US 41 Bus. south / SR 49 south (Walnut Street)	Northern end of SR 49 concurrency; southern end of US 41 Bus. concurrency
Bibb	Macon	129.229	207.974	I-75 (SR 401) / SR 540 (Fall Line Freeway) – Valdosta, Atlanta	I-75/SR 401 exit 164; split-diamond interchange; Joe A. Witherington Bridge is northbound; Raymond Berry Oakley III Bridge is southbound.
Bibb	Macon	130.291	209.683	US 41 south (Pio Nono Avenue) / SR 247 (Pierce Avenue) / US 41 Bus. ends	Northern end of US 41 Bus. concurrency; northern terminus of US 41 Bus.; southern end of US 41 concurrency
Bibb	Macon	136.083	219.004	Bass Road	Former SR 361
Monroe		142.303	229.014	I-475 (SR 408) to I-75 (SR 401) – Perry	I-475/SR 408 exit 15; folded diamond interchange
Monroe	Forsyth	151.735	244.194	US 41 north (Brooklyn Avenue) / SR 18 (Harold G Clarke Parkway) – Barnesville, Gray	Northern terminus; northern end of US 41 concurrency
1.000 mi = 1.609 km; 1.000 km = 0.621 mi: Concurrency terminus

== Special routes ==
=== Hazlehurst business loop ===
State Route 19 Business
- Location: Hazlehurst
- Existed: 1986–1995

State Route 19 Business (SR 19 Bus.) was a business route of SR 19 that existed completely within the city limits of Hazlehurst. In 1986, the path of US 23/SR 19 in the city was shifted eastward. Its former path, including the concurrent path of US 221/SR 135, was redesignated as SR 19 Bus. The next year, US 23 Bus. was established on the path of SR 19 Bus. In 1995, both US 23 Bus. and SR 19 Bus. were decommissioned. The portion not concurrent with US 221/SR 135 was redesignated as SR 135.

The entire route was in Hazlehurst, Jeff Davis County.

mi	km	Destinations	Notes
		US 23 / US 23 Bus. begins / SR 19	Southern end of US 23 Bus. concurrency; southern terminus of US 23 Bus. and SR 19 Bus.
		US 221 south / SR 135 south	Southern end of US 221/SR 135 concurrency
		US 23 / US 23 Bus. ends / US 221 north / US 341 / SR 19 / SR 27 / SR 135 north	Northern end of US 23 Bus. and US 221/SR 135 concurrencies; northern terminus of US 23 Bus. and SR 19 Bus.
1.000 mi = 1.609 km; 1.000 km = 0.621 mi: Concurrency terminus

=== Hazlehurst connector route ===
State Route 19 Connector
- Location: Hazlehurst
- Length: 0.17 mi (270 m)
- Existed: 2008–present

State Route 19 Connector (SR 19 Conn.) is a 0.17-mile-long (0.27 km) connector route that exists entirely within the city limits of Hazlehust in the north central part of Jeff Davis County, and is known as East Coffee Street for its entire length.

It begins at an intersection with US 221/SR 135 (South Tallahassee Street) in the central part of Hazlehurst. It heads northeast for two blocks and has a slight curve to the east. At that point, it meets its northern terminus, an intersection with US 23/US 341/SR 19/SR 27.

SR 19 Conn. is not part of the National Highway System, a system of roadways important to the nation's economy, defense, and mobility.

Between the beginning of 1995 and the beginning of 2009, SR 19 Conn. was established on its current path.

The entire route is in Hazlehurst, Jeff Davis County.

mi	km	Destinations	Notes
0.000	0.000	US 221 / SR 135 (South Tallahassee Street) – Denton, Uvalda	Southern terminus
0.172	0.277	US 23 / US 341 / SR 19 / SR 27 (East Jarman Street / West Coffee Street) – Alma, Baxley, McRae	Northern terminus
1.000 mi = 1.609 km; 1.000 km = 0.621 mi

=== Bolingbroke spur route ===
State Route 19 Spur
- Location: Bolingbroke
- Existed: 1965–1977

State Route 19 Spur (SR 19 Spur) was a spur route of SR 19 in the northern part of the Macon metropolitan area. The roadway that would eventually become SR 19 Spur was designated between June 1954 and June 1955 as part of SR 148 from a point northeast of Bolingbroke to SR 87 east of the community. By the beginning of 1966, Interstate 75 (I-75) was in process of being extended through the state. It replaced SR 148 from northeast of Bolingbroke to east of the community, with this segment under construction. The remainder of SR 148 was redesignated as part of SR 19 Spur, which also connected with US 23/US 41/SR 19 in Bolingbroke. The spur route paralleled I-75 east-southeast to SR 87 northwest of Macon. Between the beginning of 1953 and the beginning of 1970, US 23 was shifted eastward, off of US 41/SR 19 and onto SR 87. In 1977, SR 19 Spur was decommissioned.

County	Location	mi	km	Destinations	Notes
Bibb				US 23 / SR 87	Southern terminus
Bibb				SR 361	
Monroe				I-75 (SR 401)	I-75/SR 401 exit 62; no access from I-75/SR 401 to SR 19 Spur or from SR 19 Spur to I-75 north/SR 401 north
Monroe				US 41 / SR 19	Northern terminus
Monroe	Bolingbroke			US 41 / SR 19	Proposed northern extension; never built
1.000 mi = 1.609 km; 1.000 km = 0.621 mi: Incomplete access; Unopened
