= Georgia State Route 126 =

Highway in Georgia, US

State Route 126
- SR 126 highlighted in red

Route information
- Maintained by GDOT
- Length: 54.9 mi (88.4 km)

Major junctions
- Northwest end: SR 26 in Cochran
- US 23 / SR 87 in Cochran; US 319 / US 441 / SR 31 near Alamo; US 280 / SR 30 in Alamo
- Southeast end: SR 19 north of Lumber City

Location
- Country: United States
- State: Georgia
- Counties: Bleckley, Dodge, Laurens, Wheeler

Highway system
- Georgia State Highway System; Interstate; US; State; Special
← SR 125	→ SR 127

State Route 126 (SR 126) is a 54.9-mile-long (88.4 km) state highway that runs northwest-to-southeast through portions of Bleckley, Dodge, Laurens, and Wheeler counties in the central part of the U.S. state of Georgia.

== Route description ==
SR 126 begins at an intersection with SR 26 (East Dykes Street) in Cochran, in Bleckley County. It heads east to an intersection with U.S. Route 23 (US 23) and SR 87 on the eastern edge of the city. The highway passes through rural areas of the county, passing Cochran Airport, and enters Dodge County. In the county, the road has a brief concurrency with SR 257 in Chester. In Laurens County, it meets SR 117 (Main Street) in Cadwell. To the southwest, it begins a concurrency with SR 46 to the east. The two highways head northeast to an intersection with US 319/US 441/SR 31. The two then begin a curve to the southeast. Just over 1 mile (1.6 km) later, they split, with SR 46 heading east-northeast and SR 126 heading southeast. It enters Wheeler County, and has an intersection with US 280/SR 30. The road continues to the southeast, until it meets its southeastern terminus, an intersection with SR 19 north of Lumber City.

SR 126 is not part of the National Highway System.

== Major intersections ==
County	Location	mi	km	Destinations	Notes
Bleckley	Cochran	0.0	0.0	SR 26 (East Dykes Street) – Hawkinsville, Dudley	Western terminus
Bleckley	Cochran	0.7	1.1	US 23 / SR 87	
Dodge	Chester	12.0	19.3	SR 257 north (Carolina Street) – Dexter	Western end of SR 257 concurrency
Dodge	Chester	12.3	19.8	SR 257 south (Wynne Avenue) – Hawkinsville	Eastern end of SR 257 concurrency
Laurens	Cadwell	20.1	32.3	SR 117 (Main Street) – Eastman, Rentz	
Laurens		29.0	46.7	SR 46 west – Eastman	Western end of SR 46 concurrency
Laurens		31.8	51.2	US 319 / US 441 / SR 31	
Laurens		33.1	53.3	SR 46 east – Soperton	Eastern end of SR 46 concurrency
Wheeler	Alamo	42.8	68.9	US 280 / SR 30	
Wheeler		54.9	88.4	SR 19 – Lumber City, Glenwood	Eastern terminus
1.000 mi = 1.609 km; 1.000 km = 0.621 mi: Concurrency terminus
