= Georgia State Route 338 =

Highway in Georgia, United States

State Route 338
- SR 338 highlighted in red

Route information
- Maintained by GDOT
- Length: 22.3 mi (35.9 km)
- Existed: 1963–present

Major junctions
- South end: SR 117 in Cadwell
- SR 257 in Dexter; I-16 in Dudley; US 80 / SR 19 / SR 26 in Dudley
- North end: US 441 / SR 29 near Dublin

Location
- Country: United States
- State: Georgia
- County: Laurens

Highway system
- Georgia State Highway System; Interstate; US; State; Special
← SR 337	→ SR 339

State Route 338 (SR 338) is a 22.3-mile-long (35.9 km) state highway that travels south-to-north in a sideways V-shape completely within Laurens County in the central part of the U.S. state of Georgia. It connects Cadwell with the Dublin area, via Dudley.

== Route description ==
SR 338 begins at an intersection with SR 117 (Main Street) in Cadwell, where the roadway continues south as Old Eastman Road. The route travels to the north-northwest, to the town of Dexter, where it has a concurrency with SR 257 (North Main Street). The route continues to the north-northwest, and enters Dudley. It curves to the northeast, to an interchange with Interstate 16 (I-16; Jim Gillis Historic Savannah Parkway) in the southwestern part of the town. In the northeastern part of town, SR 338 intersects US 80/SR 19/SR 26. The route continues traveling to the northeast until it meets its northern terminus, an intersection with US 441/SR 29 northwest of Dublin. Here, the roadway continues northeast as Holly Ridge Road.

SR 338 is not part of the National Highway System, a system of roadways important to the nation's economy, defense, and mobility.

== History ==
The highway that would eventually become SR 338 was built by the end of 1953 as an unnumbered road from Caldwell to Dudley. By mid-1954, the road had been extended to US 441/SR 29, northwest of Dublin. By mid-1963, the entire roadway was designated as SR 338.

== Major intersections ==
The entire route is in Laurens County.

Location	mi	km	Destinations	Notes
Cadwell	0.0	0.0	SR 117 (Main Street) – Eastman, Dublin	Southern terminus; roadway continues as Old Eastman Road.
Dexter	6.2	10.0	SR 257 west (North Main Street) – Hawkinsville	Southern end of SR 257 concurrency
Dexter	6.5	10.5	SR 257 east (North Main Street) – Dublin	Northern end of SR 257 concurrency
	13.1	21.1	I-16 (Jim Gillis Historic Savannah Parkway / SR 404) – Macon, Savannah	I-16 exit 42
Dudley	15.1	24.3	US 80 / SR 19 / SR 26	
	22.3	35.9	US 441 / SR 29	Northern terminus; roadway continues as Holly Ridge Road.
1.000 mi = 1.609 km; 1.000 km = 0.621 mi: Concurrency terminus
