= Georgia State Route 278 =

State highway in Georgia

State Route 278
- Montrose Road
- SR 278 highlighted in red

Route information
- Maintained by GDOT
- Length: 10.9 mi (17.5 km)
- Existed: 1950–present

Major junctions
- South end: SR 26 northeast of Cochran
- North end: US 80 / SR 19 in Montrose

Location
- Country: United States
- State: Georgia
- Counties: Bleckley, Laurens

Highway system
- Georgia State Highway System; Interstate; US; State; Special
← US 278	→ SR 279

State Route 278 (SR 278) is a 10.9-mile-long (17.5 km) rural southwest–northeast state highway located in the southern part of the U.S. state of Georgia. It is locally known as Montrose Road.

== Route description ==
SR 278 is not part of the National Highway System, a system of routes important to the nation's economy, mobility and defense.

=== Bleckley County ===
SR 278 begins at an intersection with SR 26 northeast of Cochran in Bleckley County. The route heads north, then curves to the northeast to an intersection with Walker Mullis Road. Farther to the northeast is an intersection, with Cary Road heading to the northwest and Cary Salem Road heading to the southeast. A short distance later, Goldboro Road heads to the east. After that, is an intersection with Robert P. Lassiter Road. Then, the highway intersects Pea Ridge Road, which heads to the northwest. SR 278 then intersects Mt. Carmel Church Road and Talmadge Coley Road in rapid succession.

=== Laurens County ===
After Talmadge Coley Road, SR 278 crosses into Laurens County. It then intersects Laurens County Road 386 (The Rock Road). A short distance later, the road crosses over, but does not have an interchange with Interstate 16 (I-16). Northeast of I-16, the highway enters the city limits of Montrose, and meets its northern terminus, an intersection with US 80/SR 19 (Wade Street) in town.

== History ==
SR 278 was established in 1950 along the same alignment as it takes today. In this year the section of SR 278 in Bleckley County was paved. The rest of the route was paved in 1970. The highway has not experienced any major changes to its routing since 1970.

== Major intersections ==
County	Location	mi	km	Destinations	Notes
Bleckley		0.0	0.0	SR 26 (Dykes Street) – Cochran, Dudley	Southern terminus
Laurens	Montrose	10.9	17.5	US 80 / SR 19 (Wade Street) – Allentown, Dudley	Northern terminus
1.000 mi = 1.609 km; 1.000 km = 0.621 mi
