= Plainfield, Georgia =

Unincorporated community in Georgia, United States

- Unincorporated community
- Location within Georgia
- Coordinates: 32°17′20″N 83°06′44″W
- Country: United States
- State: Georgia
- County: Dodge
- Elevation: 364 ft (111 m)
- Time zone: UTC-5 (Eastern (EST))
  - Summer (DST): UTC-4 (EDT)
- Area code: 478
- GNIS feature ID: 332702

Plainfield is an unincorporated community in Dodge County, Georgia, United States. The community is located near Georgia State Route 117, 7.4 miles (11.9 km) northeast of Eastman.

== History ==
The Town of Plainfield is a rural farming community in northeast Dodge County. A railroad station was established in Plainfield and began operation in 1909. The local train, Wrightsville and Tennille Railroad, known as the "Wiggle and Twist" made a daily round-trip from Dublin through Rentz, Cadwell, and Plainfield on to Eastman.

A post office opened in 1909, serving until October 5, 2002, with a former zip code of 31073. It now shares a zip code with Eastman. A jail was built in 1910 but was destroyed by fire soon after. The Bank of Plainfield operated from 1911 until 1921 and served as the central point of town. A room near the rear of the bank was used as a jail. Plainfield was incorporated by the General Assembly of Georgia on August 7, 1912. The city limits of the town were 1000 yards in every direction utilizing the bank as the center.

In 1912 the city council approved a bid to build a town guardhouse, which was accomplished at the total cost of $12.50. A cotton gin and warehouse, built in 1909, operated from 1913 to 1939.

Plainfield Baptist Church was organized at a revival meeting held at the Plainfield Warehouse Company June 22, 1913. The church was accepted into the Dodge County Baptist Association in October 1913. The land on which the church is located was donated by the bank president, Dr. E. L. Smith.

At the height of its population it had a church, school, drug store, bank, doctors and several stores. In 1920 Plainfield had a population of 1,500. By 1940 the population had dropped to 673.

The W&T rail station closed in October, 1941. A fire station was organized in 1986, which is still in operation, as well Plainfield Baptist Church. A store, the Lee Supply Company, was the last store in operation, which closed in 2002 with the post office.
