= Georgia State Route 27 =

State highway in Georgia

State Route 27
- SR 27 highlighted in red

Route information
- Maintained by GDOT
- Length: 264 mi (425 km)
- Existed: 1919–present

Major junctions
- West end: US 82 / SR 39 / SR 50 in Georgetown
- US 27 / SR 1 in Lumpkin; US 19 / US 280 / SR 3 / SR 49 in Americus; I-75 northeast of Vienna; US 129 / US 341 / SR 11 in Hawkinsville; US 23 / US 341 Bus. / SR 27 Bus. in Eastman; US 280 / US 319 / US 441 / SR 31 in McRae; US 23 / US 221 / SR 19 / SR 135 in Hazlehurst; US 25 / US 84 / US 301 / SR 23 / SR 38 in Jesup; I-95 in Dock Junction
- East end: US 17 / US 341 / SR 25 in Brunswick

Location
- Country: United States
- State: Georgia
- Counties: Quitman, Stewart, Webster, Sumter, Dooly, Pulaski, Dodge, Telfair, Jeff Davis, Appling, Wayne, Glynn

Highway system
- Georgia State Highway System; Interstate; US; State; Special
← US 27	→ SR 27S

State Route 27 (SR 27) is a 264-mile-long (425 km) state highway that travels west-to-east through portions of Quitman, Stewart, Webster, Sumter, Dooly, Pulaski, Dodge, Telfair, Jeff Davis, Appling, Wayne, and Glynn counties in the southern part of the U.S. state of Georgia, crossing nearly the entire state from Georgetown, just east of the Alabama state line to Brunswick, just west of the Atlantic coast. The route connects US 82/SR 39/SR 50 in Georgetown with US 17/SR 25 in Brunswick, via Lumpkin, Preston, Americus, Vienna, Hawkinsville, Eastman, Helena–McRae, Hazlehurst, Baxley, and Jesup. The highway is concurrent with US 280 and US 341 for most of its length (the latter one at its eastern terminus).

== Route description ==
SR 27 begins at an intersection with US 82/SR 39/SR 50 (Middle Street) in Georgetown, within Quitman County. SR 27/SR 39 travel concurrently to the northeast. Then, the two highways diverge with SR 27 continuing through rural areas of the northeastern part of the county. The highway enters Stewart County, before entering Lumpkin. There it intersects US 27/SR 1. Three blocks later is the southern terminus of SR 1 Conn. (Chestnut Street). Farther to the northeast, in Richland, is an intersection with US 280/SR 520 (Richland Bypass). At this intersection, US 280/SR 27 begin a concurrency to the east. After leaving town, the concurrency enters Webster County. They curve to the southeast and enter Preston, where SR 41 briefly joins the concurrency. Farther along, US 280/SR 27 enter Sumter County. They enter Plains. In town is an intersection with SR 45 (Bond Street). The two highways stairstep their way to the east-northeast toward Americus. Just before entering town, first SR 49 (Salters Mill Road), and then US 19/SR 3 (South Martin Luther King Boulevard), join the concurrency. The five highways enter the city limits and curve to the northeast. Next to the Perlis Plaza Shopping Center, they intersect SR 30. At this intersection, US 280/SR 27/SR 30 east/SR 49 turn to the right, while US 19/SR 3/SR 30 west (North Martin Luther King Boulevard) continue to the northeast. The four highways intersect SR 377 (South Lee Street). Just past Oak Grove Cemetery, SR 49 departs the concurrency on Tripp Street. Next to Pine Pointe Shopping Center, SR 27 departs the concurrency to the east on Vienna Road and passes Shipp Lake and Pat Crumpton Lake, before intersecting SR 195. After that, it crosses over the Flint River into Dooly County. The highway travels to the north of Bartenfield Lake and enters Vienna. Just inside the city limits, it intersects SR 90. The two highways travel concurrent into the main part of town, to an intersection with US 41/SR 7 (3rd Street). At this intersection, SR 90 leaves the concurrency to the south, while SR 27 continues to the east-southeast. It passes George Busbee Park and meets the western terminus of SR 215 (East Union Street). Here, SR 27 curves to the north-northeast and leaves town. It curves to a more northeasterly routing and has an interchange with Interstate 75 (I-75). Then, it curves to a nearly due-east orientation. After a bend to the northeast, the highway enters Pulaski County.

There are two portions of SR 27 that are part of the National Highway System, a system of routes determined to be the most important for the nation's economy, mobility, and defense:

- The segment from Richland to Americus, concurrent with US 280
- The segment from Hawkinsville to its eastern terminus, concurrent with US 341

== History ==
=== 1920s ===
SR 27 was established at least as early as 1919 from Hawkinsville to a point northwest of Brunswick. It was also designated south-southwest and curved to the southeast to end at SR 40 northwest of St. Marys. At this time, SR 28 was established from SR 39 in Georgetown to SR 7 in Vienna. By the end of 1921, SR 50 was established on its current path in Georgetown, becoming SR 27's new western terminus, since SR 39 was shifted southeast and out of the city. The eastern terminus of SR 27 was then indicated to be at SR 25 in Brunswick. SR 27 had a segment northwest of Brunswick, which meant that it intersected itself. It was then proposed south-southwest to SR 40 in Kingsland. By the end of 1926, US 341 was designated on SR 27 from Hawkinsville to Brunswick. The separate segment from north-northwest of Brunswick to Kingsland was redesignated as US 17/SR 25. Nearly the entire Sumter County portion of the Preston–Americus segment of SR 28, as well as the portion of US 341/SR 27 east of US 17/SR 25, had a "completed hard surface". A portion of US 341/SR 27 straddling the Wayne–Glynn county line had a "completed semi hard surface". Nearly the entire Dooly County portion of the Americus–Vienna segment of SR 28 had a "sand clay or top soil" surface. Four segments of US 341/SR 27 also had this type of surface: the entire Telfair County portion, nearly the entire Appling County portion of the Hazlehurst–Baxley segment, from Baxley to just east of the Appling–Wayne county line, and the northern part of the Jesup–Brunswick segment. A portion of SR 28 east-southeast of Preston, as well as nearly the entire Wayne County portion of the Baxley–Jesup and the central portion of Glynn County segments of US 341/SR 27, was under construction. By the end of 1929, US 341/SR 27 had a completed hard surface west-northwest of Jesup. East of Lumpkin and in the Preston area, SR 28 had a sand clay or top soil surface. Southeast of Baxley, US 341/SR 27 also had this type of surface. Three segments of US 341/SR 27 were under construction: from Hawkinsville to Eastman, from McRae to Lumber City, and the entire Appling County portion of the Hazlehurst–Baxley segment. Two segments of US 341/SR 27 had completed grading: nearly the entire Lumber City–Hazlehurst segment and nearly the entire Appling County portion of the Baxley–Jesup segment.

=== 1930s ===
By the middle of 1930, SR 28 was extended northeast to Hawkinsville. The entire Glynn County portion of US 341/SR 27 had a completed hard surface. A portion of SR 28 east-southeast of Preston, as well as the McRae–Lumber City segment and Wayne County portion of the Baxley–Jesup segment of US 341/SR 27, had a sand clay or top soil surface. A portion of SR 28 west-northwest of Preston was under construction. By the end of the year, a portion of US 341/SR 27 east-southeast of Baxley had a sand clay or top soil surface. SR 28's segment between Richland and Preston, as well as the Dooly County portion of the Eastman–McRae segment of US 341/SR 27, and a portion of those highways northwest of the Wayne–Glynn county line, was under construction. By the end of 1931, US 280 was designated on SR 28 between Richland and Americus. Three segments of US 341/SR 27 had a completed hard surface: from Hawkinsville to Eastman, from northwest of McRae to Hazlehurst, and from east-southeast of Hazlehurst to Baxley. Two segments of those highways were under construction: from Eastman to northwest of McRae and a portion east-southeast of Hazlehurst. In April 1932, the Hazlehurst–Baxley segment of US 341/SR 27 had a completed hard surface. By the beginning of August, their segment between Eastman to McRae was also completed. In September, the Vienna–Hawkinsville segment of SR 28 had a sand clay or top soil surface. Late in 1934, the northern half of the Appling County portion of the Baxley–Jesup segment of US 341/SR 27, as well as a small portion east of the Appling–Wayne county line, had a completed hard surface. In the second quarter of 1935, two segments of US 341/SR 27 had a completed hard surface: from Baxley to just east of the Appling–Wayne county line and nearly the entire Wayne County portion of the Baxley–Jesup segment. A small portion east-southeast of the Appling–Wayne county line had completed grading, but was not surfaced. By the beginning of October, the entire Wayne County portion of the Baxley–Jesup segment had a completed hard surface. A portion just west of the Appling–Wayne county line was under construction. By the end of the year, from Baxley to a point southeast of Jesup, US 341/SR 27 had a completed hard surface. Near the end of the year, from Richland to just west of the Webster–Sumter county line, SR 28 was under construction. The year ended with two additional changes to SR 28. From northwest of Preston to east-southeast of it, the highway had a completed hard surface. From Richland to northwest of Preston, it had a sand clay or top soil surface. In the first quarter of 1937, a portion of SR 28 in the southwestern part of Hawkinsville had a completed hard surface. It was under construction from just east of the Dooly–Pulaski county line to southwest of Hawkinsville. In the third quarter of the year, the entire Jesup–Brunswick segment had a completed hard surface. At the end of the year, the entire length of SR 28 was redesignated as a western extension of SR 27. From the Dooly–Pulaski county line to southwest of Hawkinsville, the highway had completed grading, but was not surfaced. The western half of the Lumpkin–Richland segment was under construction. In 1938, from east-southeast of Preston to east of the Webster–Sumter county line, SR 27 was under construction. By the middle of 1939, US 25 was extended southward, onto the Jesup–Brunswick segment of US 341/SR 27. The western part of the Lumpkin–Richland segment had a completed hard surface, while the central part of it had completed grading, but was not surfaced. A portion east of Americus was under construction. In the third quarter of the year, this segment had completed grading, but was not surfaced. At the end of the year, a portion just west of the Dooly–Pulaski county line was under construction.

=== 1940s to 1990s ===
In the first quarter of 1940, the entire Preston–Americus segment had a completed hard surface. In the third quarter of the year, the western half of the Quitman County portion of the Georgetown–Lumpkin segment was under construction. During the second half of the next year, a portion east-northeast of Vienna had a completed hard surface. The western half of the Quitman County portion of the Georgetown–Lumpkin segment had completed grading, but was not surfaced. The western part of the Webster County portion of the Richland–Preston segment was under construction. In 1942, from just east-northeast of Richland to Preston, the highway had a completed hard surface. Between the beginning of 1945 and November 1946, a portion from just west of Richland to Preston was hard surfaced. By February 1948, four segments were hard surfaced: from Georgetown to a point west-southwest of Lumpkin, the Lumpkin–Richland segment, a portion east-southeast of Americus, and the entire Pulaski County segment. Also, the eastern part of the Sumter County portion of the Americus–Vienna segment had a sand clay or top soil surface. By April 1949, the entire Georgetown–Lumpkin segment was hard surfaced. Between August 1950 and January 1952, the eastern half of the Dooly County portion of the Americus–Vienna segment was hard surfaced. In 1953, the entire Dooly County portion (except the extreme western part) was hard surfaced. Between June 1955 and July 1957, the entire highway from Georgetown to Brunswick was paved. In 1972, SR 39 was extended northward on the westernmost portion of SR 27, as it travels today. Between the beginning of 1981 and the beginning of 1987, SR 782 was proposed between US 25/US 341/SR 27 and SR 27 Alt. In 1989, a southwestern bypass of Eastman, designated as SR 841, was proposed from US 341/SR 27 west of the city to US 23/US 341/SR 27 southeast of it. In 1993, US 341/SR 27 through Eastman was shifted southward out of the main part of the city onto the path of SR 841. Their former path was redesignated as US 341 Bus./SR 27 Bus. Between the beginning of 1987 and the beginning of 1997, US 23/US 341/SR 27 through Jesup was shifted northeast onto the path of SR 27 Alt. and SR 782

== Major intersections ==
County	Location	mi	km	Destinations	Notes
Quitman	Georgetown	0.0	0.0	US 82 / SR 50 / SR 39 south – Eufaula, Cuthbert, Fort Gaines	Western end of SR 39 concurrency; western terminus
Quitman	Georgetown	0.9	1.4	SR 39 north – Florence	Eastern end of SR 39 concurrency
Stewart	Lumpkin	22.4	36.0	US 27 / SR 1 (Martha Berry Highway) – Cusseta, Cuthbert	
Stewart	Lumpkin	22.9	36.9	SR 1 Conn. (Chestnut Street)	
Stewart	Richland	30.9	49.7	US 280 west / SR 520 (Richland Bypass) – Columbus, Dawson	Western end of US 280 concurrency
Webster	Preston	40.4	65.0	SR 41 south (South Washington Street) – Weston	Western end of SR 41 concurrency
Webster	Preston	40.5	65.2	SR 41 north (Cass Street) – Buena Vista, Ellaville	Eastern end of SR 41 concurrency
Sumter	Plains	49.7	80.0	SR 45 south (South Bond Street) – Dawson	Northern terminus of SR 45
Sumter		57.6	92.7	SR 49 south – Dawson	Western end of SR 49 concurrency
Sumter		58.6	94.3	US 19 south / SR 3 south (South Martin Luther King Boulevard) – Albany	Western end of US 19/SR 3 concurrency
Sumter	Americus	59.4	95.6	US 19 north / SR 3 north / SR 30 west (South Martin Luther King Boulevard) – Ellaville, Buena Vista	Eastern end of US 19/SR 3 concurrency; western end of SR 30 concurrency
Sumter	Americus	60.1	96.7	SR 377 south (South Lee Street)	Northern terminus of SR 377
Sumter	Americus	61.0	98.2	SR 49 north (Tripp Street) – Oglethorpe, Andersonville	Eastern end of SR 49 concurrency
Sumter	Americus	61.6	99.1	US 280 east / SR 30 east (East Lamar Street) – Cordele	Eastern end of US 280 and SR 30 concurrencies
Sumter		70.6	113.6	SR 195 (Bailey Avenue) – De Soto, Andersonville	
Flint River		75.7	121.8	Luther Story Bridge; marking the Sumter–Dooly county line	
Dooly	Drayton	77.4	124.6	SR 230 west (River Road) – Byromville	Western terminus of SR 230
Dooly	Vienna	86.6	139.4	SR 90 north (Union Street) – Lilly, Byromville, Montezuma	Western end of SR 90 concurrency
Dooly	Vienna	87.6	141.0	US 41 / SR 7 / SR 90 south (3rd Street)	Eastern end of SR 90 concurrency
Dooly	Vienna	88.3	142.1	SR 215 east (East Union Street) – Pitts	Western terminus of SR 215
Dooly		91.0	146.5	I-75 (SR 401) – Valdosta, Macon	I-75/SR 401 exit 112
Pulaski		109	175	SR 257 south (Cordele Highway) – Cordele	Western end of SR 257 concurrency
Pulaski	Hawkinsville	113	182	US 129 north / US 341 north / SR 11 north (Broad Street) / SR 230 north – Perry	Western end of US 129/SR 11, US 341, and SR 230 concurrencies
Pulaski	Hawkinsville	113	182	US 129 south / SR 11 south / SR 112 south (Jackson Street South) / US 129 Alt. north / US 129 Bus. north / SR 11 Bus. north (Jackson Street South) – Abbeville	Eastern end of US 129/SR 11 concurrency; western end of US 129 Alt./SR 112 concurrency; southern terminus of US 129 Bus./SR 11 Bus.
Pulaski	Hawkinsville	113	182	SR 26 west / SR 112 south	Western end of SR 26/SR 112 concurrency
Pulaski	Hartford	113.7	183.0	US 129 Alt. north / SR 26 east / SR 112 north / SR 257 north (Cochran Highway) / SR 230 east (Lower River Road) – Cochran, Rhine	Eastern end of US 129 Alt., SR 26/SR 112, SR 230, and SR 257 concurrencies
Dodge		130.1	209.4	US 341 Bus. south / SR 27 Bus. east / SR 46 east (Fish Road) – Eastman	Northern terminus of US 341 Bus.; western terminus of SR 27 Bus./SR 46
Dodge		132.2	212.8	SR 87 / SR 117 (Rhine Highway / Griffin Avenue) – Eastman, Rhine	
Dodge		133.4	214.7	US 23 north / US 341 Bus. north / SR 27 Bus. west (College Street) – Eastman	Western end of US 23 concurrency; southern terminus of US 341 Bus./SR 27 Bus.
Dodge				SR 87 Conn. north	Southern terminus of SR 87 Conn.
Dodge	Chauncey	140.6	226.3	SR 165 south (Chauncey–Rhine Highway) – Rhine	Western end of SR 165 concurrency
Dodge	Chauncey	141.1	227.1	SR 165 north to SR 46 (Chauncey–Dublin Highway)	Eastern end of SR 165 concurrency
Telfair	McRae	151.6	244.0	US 280 / US 319 / US 441 / SR 31 (3rd Avenue) – Alamo, Dublin, Douglas, Abbeville	
Telfair		156.1	251.2	SR 149 to SR 117 – Scotland	
Telfair	Lumber City	168.2	270.7	SR 117 north (Main Street) – Jacksonville	Southern terminus of SR 117
Telfair	Lumber City	168.5	271.2	SR 19 north – Glenwood	Western end of SR 19 concurrency
Jeff Davis	Hazlehurst	175.4	282.3	US 221 north / SR 135 north (North Tallahassee Street) – Uvalda	Western end of US 221/SR 135 concurrency (only US 221/SR 135 northbound join the concurrency)
Jeff Davis	Hazlehurst	175.5	282.4	SR 19 Conn. south (East Coffee Street)	Northern terminus of SR 19 Conn.
Jeff Davis	Hazlehurst	175.6	282.6	US 221 south / SR 135 south (Cromartie Street)	Eastern end of US 221/SR 135 concurrency (only US 221/SR 135 northbound join the concurrency)
Jeff Davis	Hazlehurst	176.0	283.2	US 23 south / SR 19 south (Tallahassee Street) – Alma	Eastern end of US 23 and SR 19 concurrencies
Appling	Baxley	191.3	307.9	US 1 / SR 4 / SR 15 (Main Street) – Lyons, Alma	
Appling	Surrency	201.0	323.5	SR 121 (Still Street) – Reidsville, Blackshear	
Wayne	Jesup	221	356	SR 169 (Lanes Bridge Road)	
Wayne	Jesup	222	357	US 84 / SR 38 (North 1st Street)	
Wayne	Jesup	223	359	US 301 / SR 23 (Carey Town Road) / US 25 north – Hortense, Ludowici	Western end of US 25 concurrency
Glynn	Sterling	252	406	SR 32 west / SR 99 (Grants Ferry Road) – Anguilla, Darien	Eastern terminus of SR 32
Glynn	Dock Junction	256	412	I-95 (SR 405) / Butler Drive west – Jacksonville, Savannah	I-95/SR 405 exit 36; eastern terminus of Butler Drive
Glynn	Dock Junction	258	415	SR 303 (Blythe Island Highway / Community Road)	
Glynn	Brunswick	262	422	US 25 south / SR 25 Conn. south (Gloucester Street)	Eastern end of US 25 concurrency; northern terminus of SR 25 Conn.
Glynn	Brunswick	264	425	US 17 / SR 25 (Glynn Avenue) / US 341 ends – Waverly, Darien	Eastern end of US 341 concurrency; eastern terminus of US 341 and SR 27
1.000 mi = 1.609 km; 1.000 km = 0.621 mi: Concurrency terminus

== Special routes ==
=== Eastman business loop ===
State Route 27 Business
- Location: Eastman
- Length: 3.9 mi (6.3 km)
- Existed: 1993–present

State Route 27 Business (SR 27 Bus.) is a 3.9-mile-long (6.3 km) business route of SR 27 that exists entirely within the central part of Dodge County. The route is almost entirely within the city limits of Eastman.

It begins just west of Eastman, at an intersection with US 341/SR 27.It travels to the northeast on Fish Road, concurrent with US 341 Bus./SR 46. Then, they curve to a due-east direction, onto Hawkinsville Highway. They enter the city limits of Eastman and curve to the southeast, onto Ogden Street. They turn left onto 5th Avenue and travel to the northeast. At an intersection with US 23/SR 87/SR 117 (Oak Street), SR 46 departs the concurrency, and US 23/SR 87/SR 117 join it. At Griffin Street, SR 87/SR 117 departs the concurrency. The three highways continue to the southeast and intersect US 341/SR 27 (Terry Coleman Parkway). Here, US 341 Bus. and SR 27 Bus. end, and US 23 joins the US 341/SR 27 concurrency.

SR 27 Bus. is not part of the National Highway System, a system of roadways important to the nation's economy, defense, and mobility.

In 1989, a southwestern bypass of Eastman, designated as SR 841, was proposed from US 341/SR 27 west of the city to US 23/US 341/SR 27 southeast of it. In 1993, US 341/SR 27 through Eastman was shifted southward out of the main part of the city onto the path of SR 841. Their former path was redesignated as US 341 Bus./SR 27 Bus.

The entire route is in Dodge County.

Location	mi	km	Destinations	Notes
	0.0	0.0	US 341 / SR 27 / SR 46 / US 341 Bus. begins – McRae, Hawkinsville	Western end of US 341 Bus. and SR 46 concurrencies; western terminus of SR 27 Alt. and SR 46; northern terminus of US 341 Bus.
Eastman	1.9	3.1	US 23 north / SR 87 north (Oak Street) / SR 46 east / SR 117 north (5th Avenue) to I-16 east (SR 404 east) – Cadwell, Soperton, Cochran, Eastman, Dodge County Airport, Recreation Department, Middle Georgia State University Georgia Aviation Campus	Eastern end of SR 46 concurrency; western end of US 23 and SR 87/SR 117 concurrencies
Eastman	1.5	2.4	SR 87 south / SR 117 south (Griffin Street) – Rhine, Dodge County Hospital	Eastern end of SR 87/SR 117 concurrency
Eastman	3.9	6.3	US 23 south / US 341 / SR 27 (Terry Coleman Parkway) / US 341 Bus. ends – McRae, Hawkinsville	Eastern end of US 341 Bus. concurrency; eastern terminus of SR 27 Bus.; southern terminus of US 341 Bus.; Heart of Georgia Armed Forces Veterans Memorial Intersection
1.000 mi = 1.609 km; 1.000 km = 0.621 mi: Concurrency terminus

=== McRae loop route ===
State Route 27 Loop
- Location: McRae
- Existed: 1977–1987

State Route 27 Loop (SR 27 Loop) was a loop route of SR 27 that existed in the north-central part of Telfair County. In 1977, it was established from US 23/US 341/SR 27 in Helena, through the northern part of Helena and McRae, to an intersection with US 23/US 341/SR 27 in McRae. In 1987, SR 27 Loop was decommissioned.

The entire route was in Telfair County.

Location	mi	km	Destinations	Notes
Helena			US 23 / US 341 / SR 27	Western terminus
McRae			US 280 / US 319 / US 441 / SR 30 / SR 31	
McRae			US 23 / US 341 / SR 27	Eastern terminus
1.000 mi = 1.609 km; 1.000 km = 0.621 mi

=== Jesup alternate route ===
State Route 27 Alternate
- Location: Jesup
- Existed: 1963–1989

State Route 27 Alternate (SR 27 Alt.) was an alternate route of SR 27 that existed in the north-central part of Wayne County. It existed entirely within the city limits of Jesup. Between June 1960 and June 1963, it was established from US 23/US 341/SR 27 in the northwest part of the city to an intersection with US 23/US 25/US 301/US 341/SR 23/SR 27 in the southeastern part of the city. It had a sole segment and a southwestern one-block concurrency with US 25/US 301/SR 23. In 1989, US 23/US 341/SR 27 was shifted northeast, replacing nearly the entire length of SR 27 Alt.

The entire route was in Jesup, Wayne County.

mi	km	Destinations	Notes
		US 23 / US 341 / SR 27	Western terminus
		SR 169	
		US 82 / SR 38	
		US 25 north / US 301 north / SR 23 north	West end of US 25/US 301/SR 23 concurrncy
		US 25 south / US 301 south / SR 23 south / US 23 / US 341 / SR 27	Eastern terminus; east end of US 25/US 301/SR 23 concurrncy
1.000 mi = 1.609 km; 1.000 km = 0.621 mi: Concurrency terminus

=== Brunswick spur route ===
State Route 27 Spur
- Location: Brunswick
- Existed: 1965–1981

State Route 27 Spur (SR 27 Spur) was a spur route of SR 27 that existed in the south-central part of Glynn County and completely within the city limits of Brunswick. Between June 1963 and the end of 1965, it was established and hard surfaced on 1st Avenue, extending west-southwest from US 84/US 341/SR 27 (Newcastle Street). In 1981, it was decommissioned.

The entire route was in Brunswick, Glynn County.

mi	km	Destinations	Notes
		Dead end	Western terminus
		US 84 / US 341 / SR 27 (Newcastle Street)	Eastern terminus
1.000 mi = 1.609 km; 1.000 km = 0.621 mi
