= Sugar Creek (Ocmulgee River tributary) =

Stream in Georgia, United States

Coordinates: 31°57′50.65″N 82°41′49.50″W

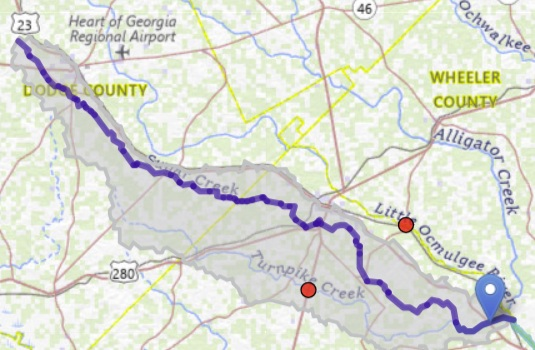
USGS map of Sugar Creek

Sugar Creek is a stream in the U.S. state of Georgia. A tributary of the Ocmulgee River, it runs through Wheeler County, Georgia, Telfair County, Georgia, and Dodge County, Georgia until it meets the Alligator Creek, approximately two miles north of Lumber City, Georgia. Alligator Creek then meets the Ocmulgee River several miles further south. Georgia State Route 87 and Georgia State Route 117 intersect and cross over Sugar Creek just before entering the city limits of Eastman, Georgia, which Sugar Creek passes on the southwest. It also runs along the southwest border of the city of Chauncey and passes through the southwest border of the city of McRae–Helena. A 1911 survey of the area reported:

The Little Ocmulgee River drains the upper part of the county chiefly by way of its tributaries, the most important of which is Sugar Creek whose watershed exclusive of Turnpike Creek contains 47.6 square miles in this county and 49.2 square miles in Dodge. Turnpike Creek is a branch of Sugar Creek and has a watershed containing 59.2 square miles in Telfair County and 18.0 square miles in Dodge. The stream channels in this watershed (Little Ocmulgee) are the worst in the county. Assuming a uniform fall in Gum Swamp, the fall in Sugar Creek between McRae and Gum Swamp is 04.7 feet. The distance is 17.5 miles, making a fall of 5.41 feet per mile.
