= U.S. Route 341 =

Highway in the United States

U.S. Highway 341
- US 341 highlighted in red

Route information
- Auxiliary route of US 41
- Maintained by GDOT
- Length: 224.9 mi (361.9 km)
- Existed: 1926–present

Major junctions
- South end: US 17 / SR 25 / SR 27 in Brunswick
- US 25 / SR 25 Conn. in Brunswick; I-95 in Brunswick; US 25 / US 84 / US 301 / SR 23 / SR 38 in Jesup; US 1 / SR 4 / SR 15 in Baxley; US 23 / US 221 / SR 19 / SR 135 in Hazlehurst; US 23 / US 341 Bus. / SR 27 Bus. in Eastman; US 41 / SR 7 / SR 11 Bus. / SR 127 in Perry; I-75 in Perry; US 80 / SR 22 / SR 42 in Knoxville
- North end: US 41 / SR 7 / SR 18 in Barnesville

Location
- Country: United States
- State: Georgia
- Counties: Glynn, Wayne, Appling, Jeff Davis, Telfair, Dodge, Pulaski, Houston, Peach, Crawford, Monroe, Lamar

Highway system
- United States Numbered Highway System; List; Special; Divided; Georgia State Highway System; Interstate; US; State; Special
← SR 340	→ SR 341

U.S. Route 341 (US 341) is a 224.9-mile-long (361.9 km) U.S. highway entirely in the U.S. state of Georgia. It travels northwest-southeast across southern Georgia (but is signed as north–south) from Brunswick at US 17/SR 25 to Barnesville at US 41/SR 7/SR 18. It is a spur route of US 41 and has two intersections with it: in Perry and at its northern terminus in Barnesville.

== Route description ==
The following portions of US 341 are part of the National Highway System, a system of routes determined to be the most important for the nation's economy, mobility, and defense:

- From its southern terminus in Brunswick to the US 41 intersection in Perry
- From just south-southeast of Fort Valley to just north-northwest of Fort Valley.

=== Brunswick to Jesup ===
US 341 begins at an intersection with US 17 and SR 25 (Glynn Avenue) in the southeast corner of the city of Brunswick, a short distance north of the Sidney Lanier Bridge. US 341 and its state route companion, SR 27, head west along 4th Street, a four-lane undivided street. The highway turns north onto Newcastle Street and passes along the edge of the Port of Brunswick. Newcastle Street becomes two lanes at 1st Avenue; US 341/SR 27 turns west onto Prince Street then north onto Bay Street, which becomes a four-lane divided highway immediately to the south of the intersection. The highway parallels Norfolk Southern Railway's Brunswick District north between downtown Brunswick to the east and an industrial area along the East River. At the north end of downtown, US 341 has an oblique intersection with US 25 (Newcastle Street), whose companion route is SR 25 Connector (SR 25 Conn.) and which serves as the main street of downtown Brunswick.

US 25/US 341/SR 27 continues north along Newcastle Street as a four-lane highway with center turn lane out of the city of Brunswick. The highway has a partial interchange with Norwich Street and its name changes to Norwich Street Extended. The highways cross over the paralleling rail line and have a partial interchange with Ross Road and another road that parallels the railroad. In the unincorporated community of Dock Junction, the highways intersect SR 303, which heads east as Community Road and west as Blythe Island Highway. Immediately to the south of the intersection is an acute intersection with SR 303 Conn., which serves as a cutoff between US 25/US 341/SR 27 and SR 303. The highways continue as New Jesup Highway across Yellow Bluff Creek and expand to a six-lane divided highway ahead of their partial cloverleaf interchange with I-95. US 25/US 341/SR 27 become a four-lane highway with center turn lane again, intersect CSX's Brunswick Subdivision at grade, and intersect SR 32 and SR 99 in the hamlet of Sterling. SR 99 heads east as Grants Ferry Road; SR 32 and SR 99 head west as Harrell Highway.

US 25/US 341/SR 27 closely parallels the Norfolk Southern rail line northwest from Glynn County into Wayne County and to the city of Jesup. The three highways enter the city as Cherry Street between their crossing of Penholoway Creek and their intersection with US 301/SR 23; US 25 splits north to join US 301/SR 23 toward Ludowici. Just north of the US 301/SR 23 intersection, US 341/SR 27 turns north onto Pine Street, a four-lane street with center turn lane that curves northwest and parallels Cherry Street through the city. The highways cross over CSX's Nahunta Subdivision between the Jesup Amtrak station and the orthogonal intersection of the CSX and Norfolk Southern lines. North of the CSX line, US 341/SR 27 intersects US 84/SR 38 (1st Street). The highways have an oblique intersection with SR 169 (Lanes Bridge Road) and collects the western end of Cherry Street as it leaves Jesup as Odum Highway. US 341/SR 27 travels through the town of Odum as its Main Street and crosses to the north side of the Norfolk Southern rail line in an S curve at the Wayne–Appling county line.

=== Jesup to Hawkinsville ===
US 341/SR 27 continues west as Golden Isles Parkway. The highway intersects SR 121 (Still Street) in the town of Surrency and crosses Satilla Creek. US 341/SR 27 meets US 1/SR 4/SR 15 (Main Street) in the city of Baxley, through which US 341/SR 27 follows Parker Street. US 341/SR 27 continues northwest into Jeff Davis County and the city of Hazlehurst. The two highways enter along Jarman Street and intersects and travels concurrently with US 23/US 221 Truck/SR 19/SR 135 Truck. Near the center of town, the six highways meet the northbound lanes of US 221/SR 135 (Cromartie Street). Northbound US 221/SR 135 travels concurrently with US 23/US 341/SR 19/SR 27 as they curve onto Coffee Street and have an oblique intersection with Tallahassee Street, which heads south as the southbound lanes of US 221/SR 135 and north with both directions of those highways. US 23/US 341/SR 19/SR 27 leaves town as Lumber City Highway.

The four highways cross the Ocmulgee River just west of its confluence with the Little Ocmulgee River and enter Telfair County and Lumber City as Golden Isles Highway. Within the city, SR 19 splits northeast toward Glenwood and the other three highways meet the eastern terminus of SR 117 (Main Street), then intersect at grade the Norfolk Southern rail line. US 23/US 341/SR 27 enters the city of McRae as Oak Street; east of downtown, the highways split into a one-way pair, Railroad Street northbound and Oak Street southbound. The streets intersect 3rd Avenue, which carries US 280/US 441/SR 30/SR 31, before rejoining and entering the neighboring city of Helena, where US 23/US 341/SR 27 intersects a CSX rail line.

The three highways follow McRae Highway when they enter Dodge County. The highway has a pair of intersections with SR 165, Chauncey–Dublin Highway and Chauncey–Rhine Highway, as it travels through the town of Chauncey. On the southern edge of Eastman, US 23/US 341 Bus./SR 27 Bus. (College Street) continue straight parallel to the Norfolk Southern rail line toward the center of town while US 341/SR 27 splits west to bypass the town. US 341/SR 27 intersects SR 87 and SR 117 (Rhine Highway) south of town and meets the northern terminus of US 341 Bus./SR 27 Bus. (Hawkinsville Highway) on the west side of town. US 341/SR 27 becomes Eastman Highway and crosses Mosquito Creek as it enters Pulaski County and approaches the city of Hawkinsville.

=== Hawkinsville to Barnesville ===
Just east of Hawkinsville, in Hartford, US 341 and SR 27 have a four-legged intersection with several highways. The south leg of the intersection is Lower River Road, which carries SR 230. The north leg of the intersection is Cochran Highway, which carries US 129 Alt./SR 26/SR 112/SR 257. The seven highways head west along Eastman Highway, whose carriageways split as they approach the Ocmulgee River. The westbound and eastbound roadways enter the city of Hawkinsville along Commerce Street and Broad Street, respectively. Immediately to the west of the river, all of the routes except SR 27 turn south from the westbound roadway onto a one-way street, which joins Broad Street as its westbound lanes. US 341 Bus. and SR 27 continue west from the turn along Commerce Street. The six-route concurrency continues to Jackson Street, where US 129 Alt. reaches its southern terminus. Jackson Street carries US 129/SR 11/SR 112 to the south and US 129 Bus./SR 11 Bus. to the north. US 129/US 341/SR 11/SR 27/SR 230/SR 257 continues west along Broad Street; SR 27 and SR 257 split southwest onto McCormick Avenue at the west end of downtown.

SR 230 continues west along Broad Street while US 129/US 341/SR 11 turns north onto an unnamed street. The three highways intersect SR 26 (Commerce Street) and intersect the northern terminus of US 129 Bus./US 341 Bus./SR 11 Bus. on the northwestern edge of the city. As the highways leave the Hawkinsville area, US 129 and its companion SR 247 split northwest onto Warner Robins Highway; US 341 and SR 11 follow Perry Highway toward Houston County. At Hayneville, the highway meets the eastern terminus of SR 224 (Larry Walker Parkway), a four-lane divided highway which leads directly to I-75, while US 341/SR 11 continues northwest toward Perry as a two-lane road. The highway crosses over a Norfolk Southern rail line at Clinchfield, then crosses Big Indian Creek and meets the southern terminus of SR 247 Spur. The two highways enter the city of Perry as Main Street. US 341/SR 11 has an acute intersection with SR 127 (Houston Lake Road), with which the highways travel concurrently for five blocks. SR 11 diverges from US 341 onto Meeting Street to join US 41 to the north; two blocks to the west, US 341/SR 127 turns north onto Ball Street and intersects US 41/SR 7 (Commerce Street); the latter route becomes US 341's companion state highway. US 341/SR 7 becomes a four-lane divided highway, Sam Nunn Boulevard, at the convergence of Ball Street and Washington Street and meets I-75 at a diamond interchange.

Northwest of Perry, US 341/SR 7 reduces to two lanes and closely parallels a Norfolk Southern rail line into Peach County. The highways enter the city of Fort Valley as Martin Luther King Jr. Drive. Just east of downtown, US 341/SR 7 turns onto Oakland Heights Parkway, which crosses over a second Norfolk Southern rail line before meeting and becoming concurrent with SR 96 at an acute intersection. The two highways diverge from SR 96 (Vineville Street) at its intersection with SR 49 (Camellia Boulevard), then intersects a third Norfolk Southern rail line. US 341/SR 7 intersects SR 49 Conn./SR 540 (Fall Line Freeway) as it leaves Fort Valley shortly before entering Crawford County. The highways enter the town of Roberta along Dugger Avenue, which meets the eastern terminus of SR 128 (Agency Street). US 341 also intersects US 80/SR 22 (Crusselle Street). At the same intersection, US 341/SR 7 becomes concurrent with SR 42, which follows US 80/SR 22 east to the adjacent community of Knoxville. US 341/SR 7 and SR 42 diverge at the hamlet of Musella. The two highways travel through the southwestern corner of Monroe County, where they meet SR 74 at a roundabout just north of the town of Culloden and SR 83 near the hamlet of Strouds. US 341/SR 7 continues northwest into Lamar County and reaches its northern terminus at a three-legged intersection with US 41 and SR 18 on the southeastern edge of Barnesville. SR 7 continues north from the intersection with US 41 and SR 18 toward the center of the city.

== Major intersections ==
County	Location	mi	km	Destinations	Notes
Glynn	Brunswick	0.000	0.000	US 17 / SR 25 / SR 27 begins – St. Simons Island, Jekyll Island	Southern terminus of US 341/SR 27; southern end of SR 27 concurrency
Glynn	Brunswick	1.986	3.196	US 25 south / SR 25 Conn. south (Gloucester Street) – St. Simons, Savannah, Downtown Brunswick	Southern end of US 25 concurrency; northern terminus of SR 25 Conn.
Glynn	Dock Junction	5.691	9.159	SR 303 Conn. south (Blythe Island Connector)	No access from eastbound SR 303 Conn. to northbound US 341; southern terminus of SR 303 Conn.
Glynn	Dock Junction	5.903	9.500	SR 303 (Blythe Island Highway / Community Road) – Woodbine, Jacksonville, FLETC Glynco, Blythe Island, College of Coastal Georgia	
Glynn	Dock Junction	7.355	11.837	I-95 (SR 405) – Jacksonville, Savannah	I-95 exit 36
Glynn	Sterling	11.680	18.797	SR 32 west / SR 99 – Alma, Darien, Hofwyl-Broadfield Plantation State Historic Site, Fort King George State Historic Site	Eastern terminus of SR 32
Wayne	Jesup	40.761	65.598	US 25 north / US 301 / SR 23 – Nahunta, Ludowici, Airport	Northern end of US 25 concurrency
Wayne	Jesup	42.151	67.835	US 84 (North First Street) / SR 38 – Blackshear, Ludowici	
Wayne	Jesup	42.983	69.174	SR 169 north (Lanes Bridge Road) – Statesboro	Southern terminus of SR 169
Appling	Surrency	62.820	101.099	SR 121 (Still Street) – Blackshear, Reidsville	
Appling	Baxley	70.164	112.918	SR 144 east (Industrial Park Drive) – Glennville	Western terminus of SR 144
Appling	Baxley	72.468	116.626	US 1 / SR 4 / SR 15 (Main Street) – Alma, Lyons, Glennville, Baxley Municipal Airport	
Jeff Davis	Hazlehurst	87.827	141.344	US 23 south / US 221 Truck south / SR 19 south / SR 135 Truck south – Alma	Southern end of US 23/SR 19 and US 221 Truck/SR 135 Truck concurrencies
Jeff Davis	Hazlehurst	88.218	141.973	Cromartie Street south (US 221 south / SR 135 south) / Plum Street north	Southern end of US 221/SR 135 concurrency (northbound only); northern end of US 221 Truck/SR 135 Truck concurrency; northern terminus of US 221 Truck/SR 135 Truck
Jeff Davis	Hazlehurst	88.288	142.086	SR 19 Conn. south (East Coffee Street) – Douglas	Northern terminus of SR 19 Conn.
Jeff Davis	Hazlehurst	88.449	142.345	US 221 / SR 135 (Tallahassee Street) – Uvalda, Business District	Northern end of US 221/SR 135 concurrency (northbound only)
Ocmulgee River		94.634	152.299	Dr. C. R. Youmans Memorial Bridge	
Telfair	Lumber City	95.351	153.453	SR 19 north – Glenwood	Northern end of SR 19 concurrency
Telfair	Lumber City	95.594	153.844	SR 117 north – Jacksonville	Southern terminus of SR 117
Telfair		107.718	173.355	SR 149 to SR 117 – Scotland	
Telfair	McRae-Helena	112.199	180.567	US 280 / US 319 / US 441 (SR 30 / SR 31 / 3rd Avenue) – Douglas, Abbeville, Alamo, Dublin, Little Ocmulgee State Park & Lodge	
Dodge	Chauncey	122.665	197.410	SR 165 north (Chauncey Dublin Highway)	Southern end of SR 165 concurrency
Dodge	Chauncey	123.222	198.307	SR 165 south (Chauncey Rhine Highway) – Rhine	Northern end of SR 165 concurrency
Dodge	Eastman	130.442	209.926	US 23 north / US 341 Bus. north / SR 27 Bus. north (College Street) – Eastman	Northern end of US 23 concurrency; southern terminus of US 341 Bus./SR 27 Bus.
Dodge	Eastman	131.626	211.832	SR 87 / SR 117 (Eastman-Rhine Road) – Rhine, Eastman, Mercer University	
Dodge		133.741	215.235	US 341 Bus. south / SR 27 Bus. south / SR 46 east to I-16 east – Eastman, Middle Georgia College Georgia Aviation Campus	Northern terminus of US 341 Bus./SR 27 Bus.; western terminus of SR 46
Dodge		135.248	217.661	SR 87 Conn. north	Southern terminus of SR 87 Conn
Pulaski	Hartford	150.076	241.524	US 129 Alt. north / SR 26 east / SR 112 north / SR 230 east (Lower River Road) / SR 257 east (Cochran Highway) – Rhine, Cochran, Ocmulgee Public Fishing Area, Pulaski State Prison, Middle Georgia College	Southern end of US 129 Alt./SR 112, SR 26, SR 230, and SR 257 concurrencies
Pulaski	Hawkinsville	150.814	242.712	US 341 Bus. north / SR 26 west (Veterans Memorial Avenue) – Hawkinsville Historic District	Northern end of SR 26 concurrency; southern terminus of US 341 Bus.; no access from US 341 south
Pulaski	Hawkinsville	150.968	242.959	US 129 south / US 129 Alt. south / US 129 Bus. north / SR 11 south / SR 11 Bus. north / SR 112 south (Jackson Street) – Abbeville, Hawkinsville Harness Racing Facility	Northern end of US 129 Alt./SR 112 concurrency; southern end of US 129 and SR 11 concurrencies; southern terminus of US 129 Bus./SR 11 Bus.
Pulaski	Hawkinsville	151.344	243.565	SR 27 south / SR 257 west (McCormick Avenue) – Vienna, Cordele	Northern end of SR 27 and SR 257 concurrencies
Pulaski	Hawkinsville	151.673	244.094	SR 230 west (Broad Street) – Unadilla	Northern end of SR 230 concurrency
Pulaski	Hawkinsville	151.945	244.532	SR 26 (Commerce Street) to I-75 – Montezuma, Cochran, Hawkinsville Historic District	
Pulaski	Hawkinsville	152.502	245.428	US 129 Bus. south / US 341 Bus. south / SR 11 Bus. south	Northern terminus of US 129 Bus./US 341 Bus./SR 11 Bus.
Pulaski		153.729	247.403	US 129 north / SR 247 north (Warner Robins Highway) – Warner Robins	Northern end of US 129 concurrency; southern terminus of SR 247
Houston	Hayneville	163.894	263.762	SR 224 west (Larry Walker Parkway) to I-75 – Montezuma	Eastern terminus of SR 224
Houston	Perry	166.862	268.538	SR 247 Spur north – Warner Robins, Robins AFB	Southern terminus of SR 247 Spur
Houston	Perry	170.227	273.954	SR 11 Bus. north (Main Street) – Perry	Southern terminus of SR 11 Bus.; former US 341 north
Houston	Perry	171.862	276.585	SR 127 – Perry, Kathleen	
Houston	Perry	173.645	279.455	US 41 / SR 11 north / SR 11 Conn. begins / SR 11 Bus. south (Macon Road) – Macon, Cordele	Northern end of SR 11 concurrency; southern end of SR 11 Conn. concurrency; eastern terminus of SR 11 Conn.; northern terminus of SR 11 Bus.
Houston	Perry	174.577	280.954	I-75 (SR 401) – Valdosta, Macon	I-75 exit 138
Houston	Perry	176.441	283.954	SR 7 south / SR 11 Conn. ends (Sam Nunn Boulevard)	Southern end of SR 7 concurrency; northern end of SR 11 Conn. concurrency; western terminus of SR 11 Conn.; former US 341 south
Peach	Fort Valley	185.515	298.557	SR 7 Conn. east (East Church Street) – Jeffersonville	Western terminus of SR 7 Conn.
Peach	Fort Valley	185.712	298.874	SR 96 east – Warner Robins	Southern end of SR 96 concurrency
Peach	Fort Valley	185.830	299.064	SR 49 (Camellia Boulevard) – Marshallville, Byron	
Peach	Fort Valley	185.855	299.105	SR 96 west (Vineville Street) – Reynolds	Northern end of SR 96 concurrency
Peach		188.019	302.587	SR 49 Conn. / SR 540 (Fall Line Freeway) – Reynolds, Butler, Byron	
Crawford	Roberta	200.188	322.171	SR 128 south (Agency Street) – Reynolds, Butler	Northern terminus of SR 128
Crawford	Roberta	200.401	322.514	US 80 / SR 22 / SR 42 south (Crussele Street) – Talbotton, Macon	Southern end of SR 42 concurrency
Crawford	Musella	206.021	331.559	SR 42 north – Forsyth	Northern end of SR 42 concurrency
Monroe		212.840	342.533	SR 74 – Thomaston, Macon	Roundabout
Monroe		215.014	346.031	SR 83 north – Forsyth	Southern terminus of SR 83
Lamar		224.879	361.908	US 41 / SR 7 north / SR 18 – Forsyth, Barnesville, Griffin	Northern terminus; northern end of SR 7 concurrency
1.000 mi = 1.609 km; 1.000 km = 0.621 mi: Concurrency terminus; Incomplete access

== Special routes ==
=== Eastman business loop ===
U.S. Highway 341 Business
- Location: Eastman
- Length: 4.1 mi (6.6 km)

U.S. Route 341 Business (US 341 Bus.) in Eastman, Georgia travels concurrently with SR 27 Bus. as well as part of US 23 and part of SR 46.

=== Hawkinsville business loop ===
U.S. Highway 341 Business
- Location: Hawkinsville
- Length: 1.3 mi (2.1 km)

U.S. Route 341 Business (US 341 Bus.) in Hawkinsville, Georgia begins on SR 26 (Commerce Street) and travels west until it branches off to the northwest across from Warren Street. It also travels concurrently with US 129 Bus. and SR 11 Bus.

=== Perry bypass route ===
U.S. Highway 341 Bypass
- Location: Perry
- Length: 6.2 mi (10.0 km)

U.S. Route 341 Bypass (US 341 Byp.) around Perry, Georgia is the northern half of an unfinished loop around the city. It also travels concurrently with SR 11 from US 341 to US 41 and SR 11 Conn. west of US 41.

In March 2018, the Georgia Department of Transportation petitioned AASHTO to eliminate US 341 Byp. in favor of re-routing mainline US 341 onto the bypass route.

The entire length of US 341 Byp. is part of the National Highway System, a system of routes determined to be the most important for the nation's economy, mobility, and defense.
