= Dodge County, Georgia =

County in Georgia, United States

- County
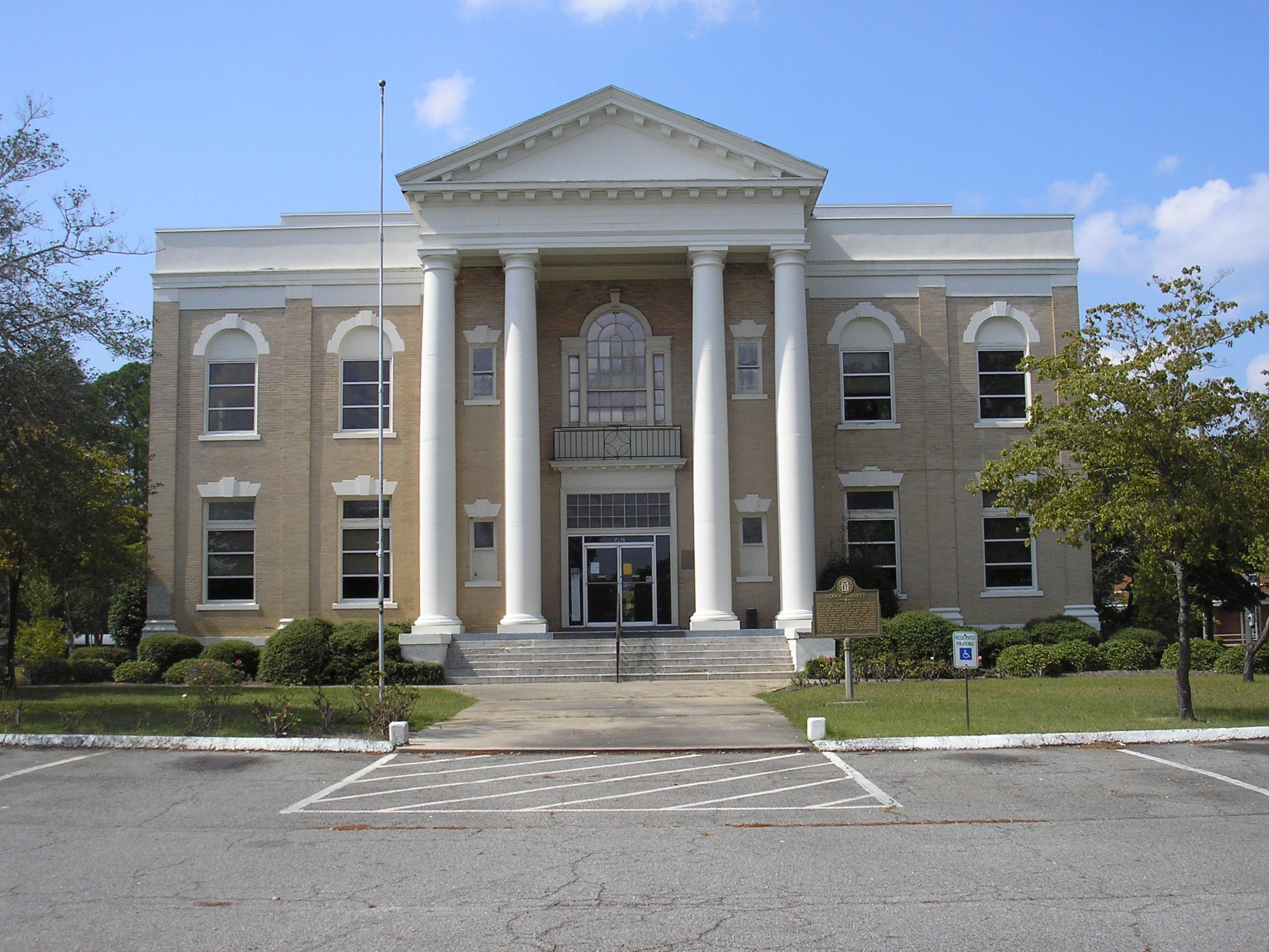
- Dodge County Courthouse in Eastman

- Location within the U.S. state of Georgia
- Coordinates: 32°10′N 83°10′W
- Country: United States
- State: Georgia
- Founded: 1870; 156 years ago
- Named for: William E. Dodge
- Seat: Eastman
- Largest city: Eastman

Area
  - Total: 503 sq mi (1,300 km^{2})
  - Land: 496 sq mi (1,280 km^{2})
  - Water: 7.2 sq mi (19 km^{2}) 1.4%

Population (2020)
  - Total: 19,925
  - Estimate (2025): 19,663 ▼
  - Density: 40/sq mi (15/km^{2})
- Time zone: UTC−5 (Eastern)
  - Summer (DST): UTC−4 (EDT)
- Congressional district: 8th
- Website: www.dodgecountyga.com

Dodge County is a county located in the southern portion of the U.S. state of Georgia. As of 2020, the population was 19,925. The county seat is Eastman. Dodge County lies in the Historic South and Black Belt region of Georgia, an area that was devoted to cotton production in the antebellum years. It has significant historic buildings and plantations, has a substantial African-American population, and shows cultural aspects of the South.

== History ==
Prior to 1802, this section of Georgia was owned by the Creek Indians. Treaties were made in 1802–1805 by which all lands east of the Ocmulgee River were taken from the Creek Indians. This land was distributed by lottery to the citizens of Georgia. In 1803, Wilkinson County was organized under that treaty. Telfair and Laurens counties were formed from Wilkinson County. In 1808, Pulaski County was formed from Laurens County. In 1869, the Macon and Brunswick Railroad was built. Towns began to spring up all up and down the line, and, as this section was so far removed from the county seat, Hawkinsville, it was deemed expedient to create a new county and place the county seat at this point. A large portion of the county was taken from Laurens County, and also smaller portions from Pulaski, Montgomery, and Telfair counties. Dodge County was organized on October 26, 1870, during the Reconstruction era. The county was named by the Republican-dominated legislature for William E. Dodge. The county courthouse was built by Dodge and used until 1908, on the same area the courthouse stands now.

== Geography ==
According to the U.S. Census Bureau, the county has a total area of 503 square miles (1,300 km^{2}), of which 496 square miles (1,280 km^{2}) is land and 7.2 square miles (19 km^{2}) (1.4%) is water.

The western half of Dodge County, roughly west of Eastman, is located in the Lower Ocmulgee River sub-basin of the Altamaha River basin. The eastern half of the county is located in the Little Ocmulgee River sub-basin of the same Altamaha River basin, with a small northern corner of Dodge County, north and west of Chester, located in the Lower Oconee River sub-basin of the larger Alamaha River basin. The rivers were important for trade, carrying cotton and timber downriver to markets.

=== Adjacent counties ===
- Laurens County - northeast
- Wheeler County - east
- Telfair County - southeast
- Wilcox County - west
- Pulaski County - west
- Bleckley County - northwest

== Communities ==
=== Cities ===
- Chauncey
- Eastman
- Milan

=== Towns ===
- Chester
- Rhine

=== Census-designated place ===
- Empire (partly in Bleckley County)

=== Unincorporated communities ===
- Plainfield

== Demographics ==
Historical population
Census	Pop.	Note	%±
1880	5,358		—
1890	11,452		113.7%
1900	13,975		22.0%
1910	20,127		44.0%
1920	22,540		12.0%
1930	21,599		−4.2%
1940	21,022		−2.7%
1950	17,865		−15.0%
1960	16,483		−7.7%
1970	15,658		−5.0%
1980	16,955		8.3%
1990	17,607		3.8%
2000	19,171		8.9%
2010	21,796		13.7%
2020	19,925		−8.6%
2025 (est.)	19,663	▼	−1.3%
U.S. Decennial Census; 1790-1880 1890-1910; 1920-1930 1930-1940; 1940-1950 1960-1980; 1980-2000 2010

=== Racial and ethnic composition ===
Dodge County, Georgia – Racial and ethnic composition Note: the US Census treats Hispanic/Latino as an ethnic category. This table excludes Latinos from the racial categories and assigns them to a separate category. Hispanics/Latinos may be of any race.
Race / Ethnicity (NH = Non-Hispanic)	Pop 1980	Pop 1990	Pop 2000	Pop 2010	Pop 2020	% 1980	% 1990	% 2000	% 2010	% 2020
White alone (NH)	12,338	12,564	13,142	14,273	12,865	72.77%	71.36%	68.55%	65.48%	64.57%
Black or African American alone (NH)	4,426	4,843	5,623	6,451	5,847	26.10%	27.51%	29.33%	29.60%	29.35%
Native American or Alaska Native alone (NH)	9	16	34	39	21	0.05%	0.09%	0.18%	0.18%	0.11%
Asian alone (NH)	22	35	42	101	95	0.13%	0.20%	0.22%	0.46%	0.48%
Native Hawaiian or Pacific Islander alone (NH)	x	x	4	3	8	x	x	0.02%	0.01%	0.04%
Other race alone (NH)	7	1	6	11	42	0.04%	0.01%	0.03%	0.05%	0.21%
Mixed race or Multiracial (NH)	x	x	72	186	427	x	x	0.38%	0.85%	2.14%
Hispanic or Latino (any race)	153	148	248	732	620	0.90%	0.84%	1.29%	3.36%	3.11%
Total	16,955	17,607	19,171	21,796	19,925	100.00%	100.00%	100.00%	100.00%	100.00%

=== 2020 census ===
As of the 2020 census, the county had a population of 19,925. The median age was 41.8 years. 21.2% of residents were under the age of 18 and 18.5% of residents were 65 years of age or older. For every 100 females there were 108.2 males, and for every 100 females age 18 and over there were 110.4 males age 18 and over. 31.2% of residents lived in urban areas, while 68.8% lived in rural areas.

The racial makeup of the county was 65.3% White, 29.5% Black or African American, 0.1% American Indian and Alaska Native, 0.5% Asian, 0.1% Native Hawaiian and Pacific Islander, 1.4% from some other race, and 3.1% from two or more races. Hispanic or Latino residents of any race comprised 3.1% of the population.

There were 7,507 households in the county, of which 30.1% had children under the age of 18 living with them and 31.0% had a female householder with no spouse or partner present. About 30.4% of all households were made up of individuals and 13.9% had someone living alone who was 65 years of age or older.

There were 8,533 housing units, of which 12.0% were vacant. Among occupied housing units, 64.8% were owner-occupied and 35.2% were renter-occupied. The homeowner vacancy rate was 0.8% and the rental vacancy rate was 5.2%.

== Transportation ==
=== Major highways ===
- US 23
- US 280 / SR 30
- US 319 / US 441 / SR 31
- US 341 / SR 27
  - US 341 Bus. / SR 27 Bus.
- SR 46
  - SR 46 Conn.
- SR 87
  - SR 87 Conn.
- SR 117
- SR 126
- SR 165
- SR 230
- SR 257

=== Airport ===
The Heart of Georgia Regional Airport is located three miles east of Eastman off of State Route 46. Elevation 304'. Runway 02/20 is 6,506'x100'and has a precision instrument landing system. The airport is owned by the Heart of Georgia Regional Airport Authority and is home to the Middle Georgia State College Georgia Aviation campus. Middle Georgia State College operates the Federal Aviation Administration's #1 ranked student control tower in the United States. Other businesses at the airport include aircraft manufacturing, aircraft metal finishing, and general metal fabrication. The airport's fixed-base operator is located in the terminal building midfield. The terminal building is named after W. S. Stuckey Sr., founder of Stuckey's Candy Company (now Standard Candy) an aviation pioneer who is from Eastman.

== Politics ==
=== Representation ===
As of the 2020s, Dodge County is a strongly Republican voting county, voting 71% for Donald Trump in 2024. For elections to the United States House of Representatives, Dodge County is part of Georgia's 8th congressional district, currently represented by Austin Scott. For elections to the Georgia State Senate, Dodge County is part of District 20. For elections to the Georgia House of Representatives, Dodge County is part of district District 133.

=== Vote-buying controversy ===
Dodge County has been at the center of several voter fraud and vote buying controversies over the past several decades.

==== 1990s ====
The most notable incident of voter fraud in Dodge County in the 1990s is the case of United States vs. McCranie. In this case, there were two defendants being tried together for several different methods of voter fraud. These methods included vote buying, vote selling, multiple voting, and votes cast by felons and deceased voters. The case involved the winners of the July 9, 1996, races for Dodge County Sheriff and Dodge County Commissioner. The races were decided by 9 votes and 31 votes, respectively. The original results of the election had been contested, and a secondary election took place in an attempt to resolve the issue. In the secondary election, the Dodge County Sheriff's race was overturned, but the results of the Dodge County Commissioner's race remained the same.

A joint federal-state investigation into the events of this election found that the defendants likely worked together to buy votes. This was backed up with bank records that showed that the defendants had each obtained $15,000 in cash in $20 bills from the Bank of Eastman. The two defendants were accused of voter fraud and sentenced on March 12, 1999. Many federal officials described the 1996 election trial as the largest election-fraud prosecution in United States history.

==== 2000s ====
The most notable case of voter fraud in the 2000s is the case of the 2004 Dodge County Sheriff's race. Former Dodge County Sheriff Lawton Douglas Jr. was indicted on two counts of conspiracy and four counts of vote buying in July 2009. This indictment came due to an investigation of the 2004 election, and did not include any charges for the potentially fraudulent 2008 election. Former Sheriff Lawton Douglas received a maximum sentence. The sentencing cited Douglas's use of cash, liquor, and drugs to buy votes in the election. Also, Douglas had people accompany voters into the polling booths to ensure that the vote actually went to him. His sentence was 18 months in federal prison.

=== Election results ===
United States presidential election results for Dodge County, Georgia
Year	Republican		Democratic		Third party(ies)	
Year	No.	%	No.	%	No.	%
1912	28	3.87%	684	94.48%	12	1.66%
1916	35	3.95%	788	88.84%	64	7.22%
1920	177	22.01%	627	77.99%	0	0.00%
1924	91	5.19%	1,654	94.30%	9	0.51%
1928	273	28.74%	677	71.26%	0	0.00%
1932	33	1.16%	2,809	98.80%	1	0.04%
1936	71	5.31%	1,259	94.24%	6	0.45%
1940	171	11.74%	1,280	87.91%	5	0.34%
1944	237	14.16%	1,437	85.84%	0	0.00%
1948	210	8.49%	1,725	69.75%	538	21.75%
1952	454	11.64%	3,445	88.36%	0	0.00%
1956	738	17.50%	3,479	82.50%	0	0.00%
1960	1,134	23.80%	3,630	76.20%	0	0.00%
1964	3,285	58.03%	2,376	41.97%	0	0.00%
1968	1,055	18.54%	1,230	21.61%	3,406	59.85%
1972	4,346	83.10%	884	16.90%	0	0.00%
1976	848	13.87%	5,267	86.13%	0	0.00%
1980	1,719	26.64%	4,635	71.83%	99	1.53%
1984	2,765	52.39%	2,513	47.61%	0	0.00%
1988	2,677	54.95%	2,164	44.42%	31	0.64%
1992	2,287	36.43%	3,002	47.82%	989	15.75%
1996	2,478	42.86%	2,696	46.64%	607	10.50%
2000	3,472	59.08%	2,326	39.58%	79	1.34%
2004	4,584	65.52%	2,384	34.08%	28	0.40%
2008	5,543	67.40%	2,595	31.55%	86	1.05%
2012	5,214	67.24%	2,442	31.49%	98	1.26%
2016	5,021	71.64%	1,839	26.24%	149	2.13%
2020	5,843	72.39%	2,172	26.91%	57	0.71%
2024	6,249	74.84%	2,081	24.92%	20	0.24%

United States Senate election results for Dodge County, Georgia2
Year	Republican		Democratic		Third party(ies)	
Year	No.	%	No.	%	No.	%
2020	5,793	72.85%	2,021	25.41%	138	1.74%
2020	5,165	71.98%	2,011	28.02%	0	0.00%

United States Senate election results for Dodge County, Georgia3
Year	Republican		Democratic		Third party(ies)	
Year	No.	%	No.	%	No.	%
2020	2,897	37.33%	1,421	18.31%	3,442	44.36%
2020	5,160	71.86%	2,021	28.14%	0	0.00%
2022	4,895	74.08%	1,640	24.82%	73	1.10%
2022	4,634	74.10%	1,620	25.90%	0	0.00%

Georgia Gubernatorial election results for Dodge County
Year	Republican		Democratic		Third party(ies)	
Year	No.	%	No.	%	No.	%
2022	5,087	61.27%	3,191	38.43%	25	0.30%

== See also ==
- National Register of Historic Places listings in Dodge County, Georgia
- List of counties in Georgia
