= Hartford, Georgia =

Hartford
- Unincorporated community
- Location within the state of Georgia Hartford (the United States)
- Coordinates: 32°17′9″N 83°26′57″W
- Country: United States
- State: Georgia
- County: Pulaski
- Elevation: 256 ft (78 m)
- Time zone: UTC-5 (Eastern (EST))
  - Summer (DST): UTC-4 (EDT)
- GNIS feature ID: 356213

Hartford (also Old Hartford) is an unincorporated community in Pulaski County, Georgia, United States. It lies a short distance east of the city of Hawkinsville, the county seat of Pulaski County. Hartford sits at the intersection of Alternate U.S. Route 129 with State Routes 26, 27, 230, 257, and U.S. Route 341. Its elevation is 256 feet (78 m).

The community was named after Nancy Hart. Hartford served as seat of Pulaski County from the formation of the county in 1809 until 1836 when the seat was transferred to Hawkinsville.

== See also ==
- List of county seats in Georgia (U.S. state)
