= Georgia State Route 117 =

State highway in Georgia, United States

State Route 117
- SR 117 highlighted in red

Route information
- Maintained by GDOT
- Length: 89.4 mi (143.9 km)

Major junctions
- Southeast end: US 23 / US 341 / SR 27 in Lumber City
- US 319 / US 441 / SR 31 in Jacksonville; US 280 / SR 30 / SR 165 in Rhine; US 341 / SR 27 in Eastman; US 23 / US 341 Bus. / SR 27 Bus. in Eastman; SR 27 Bus. / SR 46 in Eastman; US 319 / US 441 / SR 31 northeast of Rentz; I-16 in Dublin; US 319 / US 441 / US 441 Byp. / SR 31 in Dublin; US 80 / SR 19 / SR 26 west-northwest of Dublin
- Northwest end: US 441 / SR 29 northwest of Dublin

Location
- Country: United States
- State: Georgia
- Counties: Telfair, Dodge, Laurens

Highway system
- Georgia State Highway System; Interstate; US; State; Special
← SR 116	→ SR 118

State Route 117 (SR 117) is an 89.4-mile-long (143.9 km) state highway that runs southeast-to-northwest in an upside down question mark around McRae. It travels through portions of Telfair, Dodge, and Laurens counties in the central part of the U.S. state of Georgia. It connects Lumber City with the Dublin, Georgia, micropolitan area, via Jacksonville and Eastman.

== Route description ==
SR 117 begins at an intersection with US 23/US 341/SR 27 (Golden Isles Highway), in Lumber City, within Telfair County. It heads to the southwest, and intersects the southern terminus of SR 149 Connector (Big Horse Creek Road). The route continues to the southwest and meets US 319/US 441/SR 31 in Jacksonville. Heading to the northwest, it intersects the southern terminus of SR 165 and the southwestern terminus of SR 132, before crossing into Dodge County and entering the town of Rhine. There, it intersects US 280/SR 30/SR 165 (2nd Street). At this intersection, SR 117/SR 165 head to the north on a very brief concurrency. After the concurrency ends, SR 117 travels through rural areas of the county and intersects SR 87 (Abbeville Highway), just before entering Eastman. In Eastman, they first meet US 341/SR 27 (Terry Coleman Parkway). Just to the northeast is US 23/US 341 Business/SR 27 Business (Oak Street). The five routes are concurrent to the northwest for about 2,000 feet (610 m), until they meet SR 46 (5th Avenue). At this intersection, SR 27 Business turns onto SR 46 west, while SR 117 turns onto SR 46 east, and US 23/US 341 Business/SR 87 continue straight ahead. Less than 1,000 feet (300 m) later, SR 117 splits off to continue to the northeast. It enters Laurens County shortly before passing through the town of Cadwell. There, it has an intersection with SR 126 (Burch Street). Just before leaving town is the southern terminus of SR 338 (Dexter Street). To the northeast is the town of Rentz. SR 117 continues traveling to the northeast until it has a second intersection with US 319/US 441/SR 31, approximately 4 miles (6.4 km) northeast of Rentz. It is unclear whether SR 117 is signed between this intersection or not. US 319/US 441/SR 31/SR 117 travel in a northward direction through rural areas of the county until they enter Dublin. Just inside the city limits is an interchange with Interstate 16 (I-16; Jim Gillis Historic Savannah Parkway). The four highways curve to the north-northeast and intersect the southern terminus of US 441 Bypass. At this intersection, US 319/US 441/SR 31 continue into the main part of town, while US 441 Bypass/SR 117 bypass it to the west. They travel to the west-northwest and curve to the northwest and intersect SR 257. They leave the city limits, cross over a Georgia Central Railway line, and curve to the north and intersect US 80/SR 19/SR 26 southeast of the W. H. 'Bud' Barron Airport. The two highways curve to the northeast and curve back to a northerly direction, until they meet their northern terminus, an intersection with US 441/SR 29.

SR 117 is not part of the National Highway System, a system of roadways important to the nation's economy, defense, and mobility.

== Major intersections ==
County	Location	mi	km	Destinations	Notes
Telfair	Lumber City	0.0	0.0	US 23 / US 341 / SR 27 (Golden Isles Highway)	Southern terminus
Telfair		11.8	19.0	SR 149 Conn. north (Big Horse Creek Road) – McRae	Southern terminus of SR 149 Conn.
Telfair	Jacksonville	20.0	32.2	US 319 / US 441 / SR 31	
Telfair		28.0	45.1	SR 165 north – Milan	Southern terminus of SR 165
Telfair		30.7	49.4	SR 132 northeast – McRae	Southwestern terminus of SR 132
Dodge	Rhine	39.3	63.2	US 280 / SR 30 / SR 165 south (2nd Street)	Southern end of SR 165 concurrency
Dodge	Rhine	39.9	64.2	SR 165 north – Chauncey	Northern end of SR 165 concurrency
Dodge		51.9	83.5	SR 87 south (Abbeville Highway) – Abbeville	Southern end of SR 87 concurrency
Dodge				Bridge over Sugar Creek	
Dodge	Eastman	52.7	84.8	US 341 / SR 27 (Terry Coleman Parkway)	
Dodge	Eastman	53.8	86.6	US 23 south / US 341 Bus. south / SR 27 Bus. south (College Street)	Southern end of US 23/US 341 Bus./SR 27 Bus. concurrency
Dodge	Eastman	54.2	87.2	US 23 north / US 341 Bus. north / SR 87 north (Oak Street) / SR 27 Bus. north / SR 46 west (5th Avenue) – Cochran, Hawkinsville	Northern end of SR 27 Bus. concurrency; southern end of SR 46 concurrency
Dodge	Eastman	54.4	87.5	SR 46 east (5th Avenue) – Soperton, Airport	Northern end of SR 46 concurrency
Laurens	Cadwell	67.2	108.1	SR 126 (Burch Street) – Chester	
Laurens	Cadwell	67.7	109.0	SR 338 north (Dexter Street) – Dexter	Southern terminus of SR 338
Laurens	Rentz	75.7	121.8	US 319 / US 441 / SR 31	Southern end of US 319/US 441/SR 31 concurrency
Laurens	Dublin	80.0	128.7	I-16 (Jim Gillis Historic Savannah Parkway / SR 404) – Macon, Savannah	I-16 exit 51
Laurens	Dublin	81.1	130.5	US 319 north / US 441 north / SR 31 north / US 441 Byp. north – Nicklesville, Irwinton, Milledgeville	Northern end of US 319/US 441/SR 31 concurrency; southern end of US 441 Byp. concurrency; southern terminus of US 441 Byp.
Laurens		83.2	133.9	SR 257 – Dexter, Dublin	
Laurens		86.0	138.4	US 80 / SR 19 / SR 26	
Laurens		89.4	143.9	US 441 / SR 29 / US 441 Byp. end	Northern end of US 441 Byp. concurrency; northern terminus of US 441 Byp./SR 117
1.000 mi = 1.609 km; 1.000 km = 0.621 mi: Concurrency terminus
