= Rentz, Georgia =

- Town
- Location in Laurens County and the state of Georgia
- Coordinates: 32°23′3″N 82°59′30″W
- Country: United States
- State: Georgia
- County: Laurens

Area
  - Total: 1.06 sq mi (2.74 km^{2})
  - Land: 1.05 sq mi (2.72 km^{2})
  - Water: 0.0077 sq mi (0.02 km^{2})
- Elevation: 305 ft (93 m)

Population (2020)
  - Total: 312
  - Density: 297.2/sq mi (114.74/km^{2})
- Time zone: UTC−5 (Eastern (EST))
  - Summer (DST): UTC−4 (EDT)
- ZIP Code: 31075
- Area code: 478
- FIPS code: 13-64680
- GNIS|321523 feature ID: 0321523

Rentz is a town in Laurens County, Georgia, United States. The population was 312 in 2020.

== History ==
The Georgia General Assembly incorporated Rentz as a town in 1905. The community was named after E. P. Rentz, a businessperson in the local lumber industry. A post office has been in operation at Rentz since 1905.

== Geography ==
Rentz is located in southwestern Laurens County at 32°23′3″N 82°59′30″W (32.384064, -82.991633). Georgia State Route 117 (Proctor Street) runs through the center of town; it leads northeast 4 miles (6 km) to U.S. Route 441 and southwest the same distance to Cadwell. Dublin, the county seat, is 13 miles (21 km) northeast of Rentz via Routes 117 and 441.

According to the United States Census Bureau, Rentz has a total area of 1.0 square mile (2.7 km^{2}), of which 0.01 square miles (0.02 km^{2}), or 0.67%, are water.

== Demographics ==
Historical population
Census	Pop.	Note	%±
1910	275		—
1920	219		−20.4%
1930	345		57.5%
1940	319		−7.5%
1950	302		−5.3%
1960	307		1.7%
1970	392		27.7%
1980	337		−14.0%
1990	364		8.0%
2000	304		−16.5%
2010	295		−3.0%
2020	312		5.8%
U.S. Decennial Census

As of the census of 2000, there were 304 people, 142 households, and 94 families residing in the town. By 2020, its population grew to 312.

== Education ==
Though Rentz once had a grade 1–12 school, it closed many years ago. Laurens County Schools opened Southwest Laurens Elementary just outside town in the fall of 2000.
