= Dodge County Courthouse (Georgia) =

Historic courthouse in US state of Georgia

- U.S. National Register of Historic Places
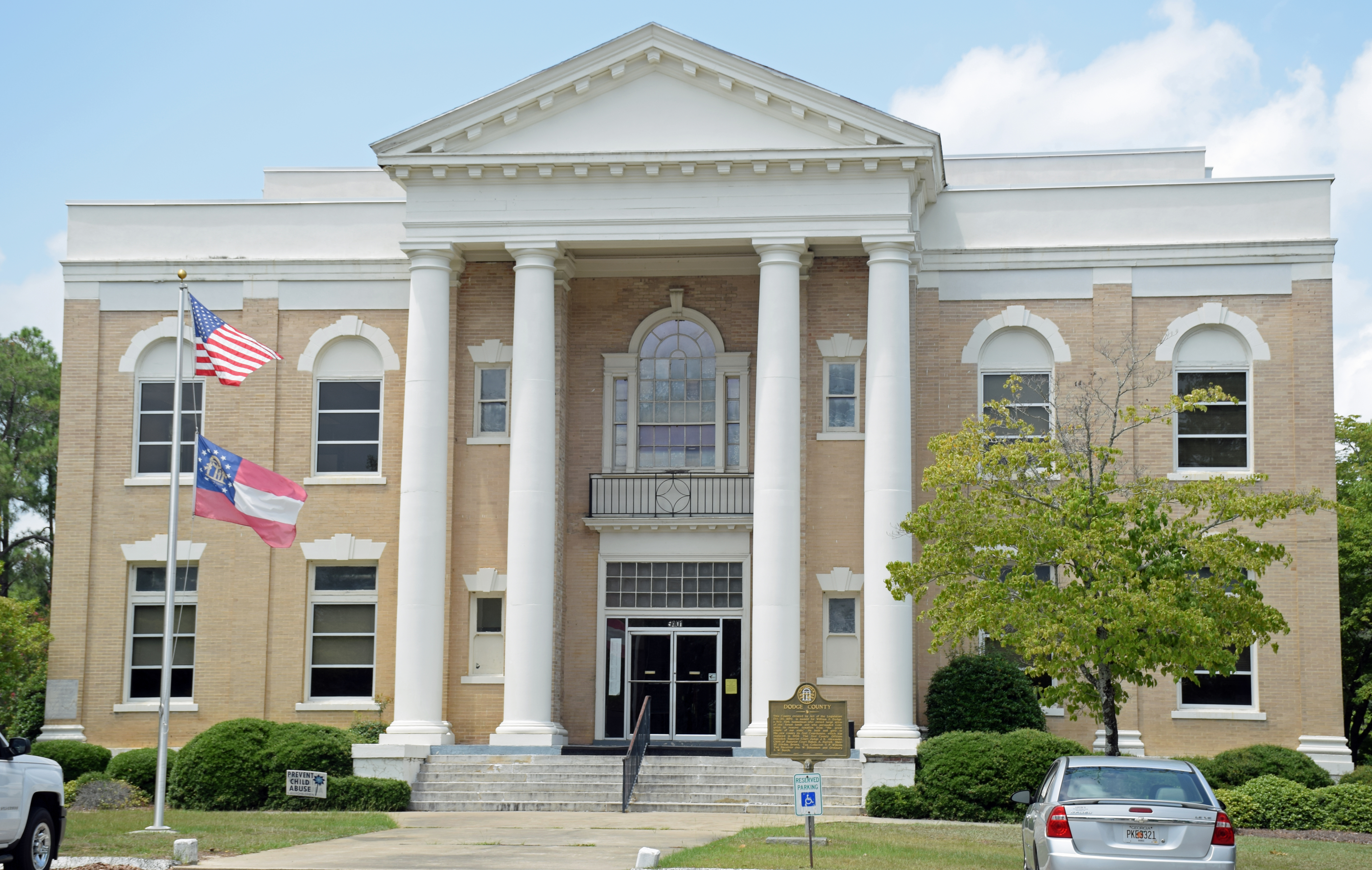

- Location within Georgia Location within the United States
- Location: Eastman, Georgia
- Coordinates: 32.20099°N 83.17601°W
- Built: 1908
- Built by: M.L. Lewman & Co.
- Architect: Edward Columbus Hosford
- Architectural style: Classical Revival
- MPS: Georgia County Courthouses TR
- NRHP reference No.: 80001012
- Added to NRHP: September 18, 1980

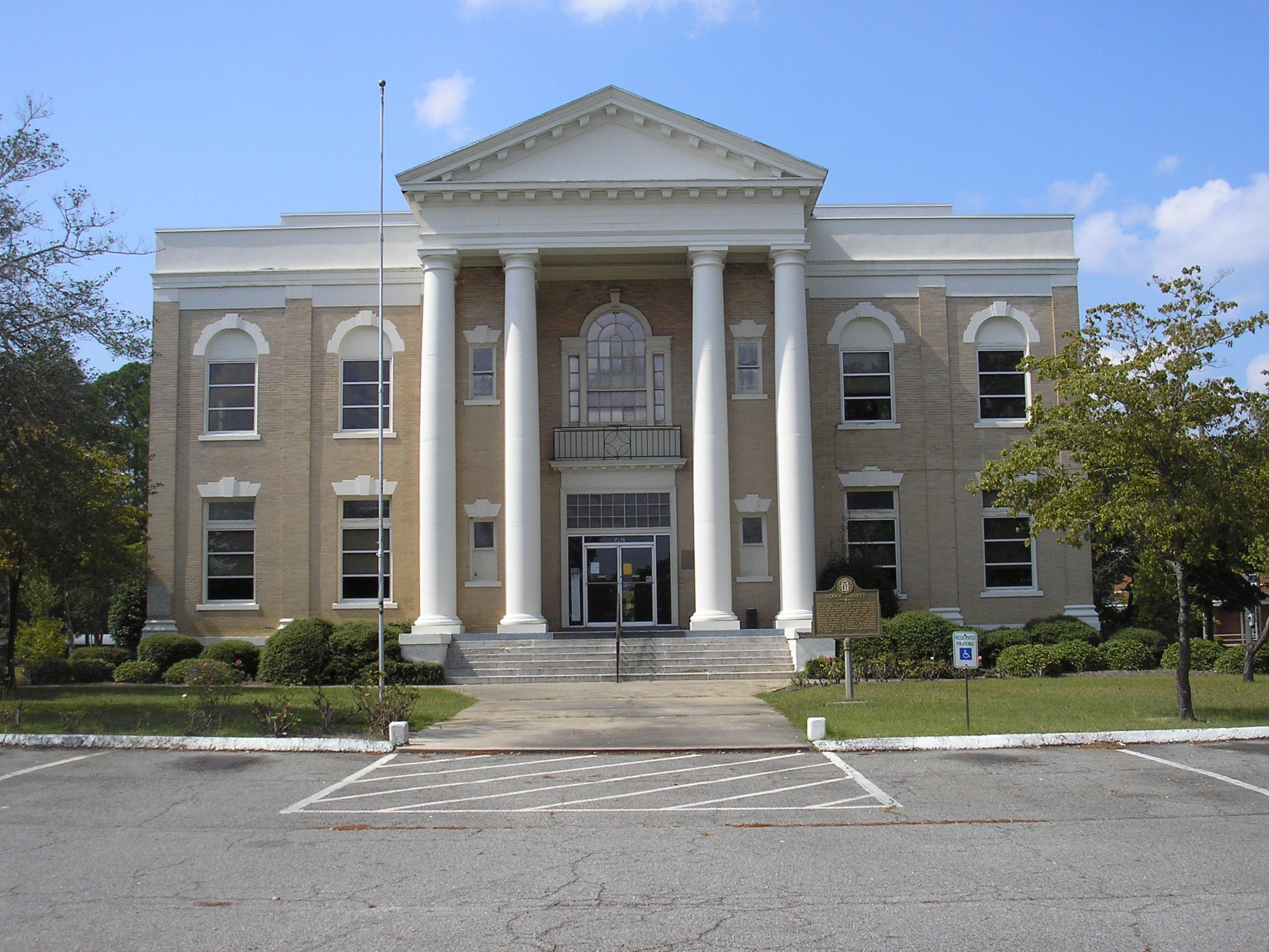
Courthouse in 2013

The Dodge County Courthouse is a historic courthouse building located in Eastman, Georgia. Built in 1908, it was designed by Eastman-born American architect Edward Columbus Hosford, who is noted for the courthouses and other buildings that he designed in Florida, Georgia and Texas. The builder was M.L. Lewman & Company. This was the first courthouse Hosford designed. His commission was controversial because his father, Charlie Columbus Hosford, was a member of the building committee appointed by the county commissioners. Since Edward C. Hosford then lived in Atlanta, it was rumored that he was going to farm the project out to the more experienced architect who had been bypassed in order to give him the commission, but he moved back to Eastman and did all the work himself.

On September 18, 1980, the building was added to the National Register of Historic Places.

In recent history, members of the Dodge County Board of Commissioners have debated demolishing the historic courthouse due to pigeon contamination.

== See also ==
- National Register of Historic Places listings in Dodge County, Georgia
