= Dexter, Georgia =

- Town
- Location in Laurens County and the state of Georgia
- Coordinates: 32°26′4″N 83°3′32″W
- Country: United States
- State: Georgia
- County: Laurens

Area
  - Total: 0.78 sq mi (2.03 km^{2})
  - Land: 0.77 sq mi (1.99 km^{2})
  - Water: 0.019 sq mi (0.05 km^{2})
- Elevation: 312 ft (95 m)

Population (2020)
  - Total: 655
  - Density: 853/sq mi (329.5/km^{2})
- Time zone: UTC-5 (Eastern (EST))
  - Summer (DST): UTC-4 (EDT)
- ZIP code: 31019
- Area code: 478
- FIPS code: 13-22752
- GNIS feature ID: 0331543

Dexter is a town in Laurens County, Georgia, United States. As of 2020, its population was 655.

== History ==
The first permanent settlement at Dexter was made in 1889. A post office has been in operation at Dexter since 1890. The Georgia General Assembly incorporated the place in 1891 as the "Town of Dexter".

== Geography ==
Dexter is located in western Laurens County at 32°26′4″N 83°3′32″W (32.434580, -83.058904). Georgia State Route 257 is the town's Main Street; the highway leads northeast 12 miles (19 km) to Dublin, the county seat, and southwest 6 miles (10 km) to Chester. State Route 338 leads north 9 miles (14 km) to Dudley and south 7 miles (11 km) to Cadwell.

According to the United States Census Bureau, Dexter has a total area of 0.77 square miles (2.0 km^{2}), of which 0.02 square miles (0.05 km^{2}), or 2.31%, are water. The town sits on a low ridge between Boggy Branch to the north and Stitchihatchie Creek to the south. Both streams flow northeast to Rocky Creek, part of the Oconee River watershed.

== Demographics ==
Historical population
Census	Pop.	Note	%±
1900	199		—
1910	550		176.4%
1920	481		−12.5%
1930	336		−30.1%
1940	324		−3.6%
1950	264		−18.5%
1960	359		36.0%
1970	438		22.0%
1980	527		20.3%
1990	475		−9.9%
2000	509		7.2%
2010	575		13.0%
2020	655		13.9%
U.S. Decennial Census

Dexter racial composition as of 2020
Race	Num.	Perc.
White (non-Hispanic)	403	61.53%
Black or African American (non-Hispanic)	223	34.05%
Asian	2	0.31%
Other/Mixed	22	3.36%
Hispanic or Latino	5	0.76%

As of the 2020 United States census, there were 655 people, 271 households, and 215 families residing in the town.
