= Montrose, Georgia =

- Town
- Location in Laurens County and the state of Georgia
- Coordinates: 32°33′30″N 83°9′8″W
- Country: United States
- State: Georgia
- County: Laurens

Area
  - Total: 1.62 sq mi (4.20 km^{2})
  - Land: 1.61 sq mi (4.18 km^{2})
  - Water: 0.0077 sq mi (0.02 km^{2})
- Elevation: 384 ft (117 m)

Population (2020)
  - Total: 203
  - Density: 125.7/sq mi (48.55/km^{2})
- Time zone: UTC-5 (Eastern (EST))
  - Summer (DST): UTC-4 (EDT)
- ZIP code: 31065
- Area code: 478
- FIPS code: 13-52500
- GNIS feature ID: 0318408

Montrose is a town in Laurens County, Georgia, United States. The population was 203 in 2020.

== History ==
The Georgia General Assembly incorporated Montrose as a town in 1929.

== Geography ==
Montrose is located at 32°33′30″N 83°9′8″W (32.558253, -83.152311).

According to the United States Census Bureau, the town has a total area of 1.6 square miles (4.1 km^{2}), all land.

Montrose is US Route 80 at the junction of State Highway 278 and is north of Interstate 16.

== Demographics ==
Historical population
Census	Pop.	Note	%±
1920	210		—
1930	226		7.6%
1940	90		−60.2%
1950	242		168.9%
1960	236		−2.5%
1970	199		−15.7%
1980	170		−14.6%
1990	117		−31.2%
2000	154		31.6%
2010	215		39.6%
2020	203		−5.6%
U.S. Decennial Census

At the 2000 census, there were 154 people, 55 households and 44 families residing in the town. By 2020, its population was 203.

== Notable people ==
- Jeralean Talley
- Demaryius Thomas
