= Cadwell, Georgia =

- Town
- Location in Laurens County and the state of Georgia
- Coordinates: 32°20′25″N 83°2′33″W
- Country: United States
- State: Georgia
- County: Laurens

Area
  - Total: 1.29 sq mi (3.33 km^{2})
  - Land: 1.25 sq mi (3.25 km^{2})
  - Water: 0.031 sq mi (0.08 km^{2})
- Elevation: 390 ft (120 m)

Population (2020)
  - Total: 381
  - Density: 304.0/sq mi (117.37/km^{2})
- Time zone: UTC-5 (Eastern (EST))
  - Summer (DST): UTC-4 (EDT)
- ZIP code: 31009
- Area code: 478
- FIPS code: 13-12344
- GNIS feature ID: 0331305

Cadwell is a town in Laurens County, Georgia, United States. The population was 381 in 2020.

== History ==
The Georgia General Assembly incorporated the place as the "Town of Cadwell" in 1907. The community was named after Matthew and Rebecca Cadwell, the original owners of the town site.

== Geography ==
Cadwell is located in southwestern Laurens County at 32°20′25″N 83°2′33″W (32.340353, -83.042462). Georgia State Route 117 passes through the town as its Main Street; via SR 117 it is 17 miles (27 km) northeast to Dublin, the county seat, and 13 miles (21 km) southwest to Eastman. State Route 126 passes through the center of Cadwell as Burch Street; it leads northwest 8 miles (13 km) to Chester and southeast 22 miles (35 km) to Alamo.

According to the United States Census Bureau, Cadwell has a total area of 1.3 square miles (3.3 km^{2}), of which 0.03 square miles (0.08 km^{2}), or 2.52%, are water. The west side of the town drains to Bay Creek, a south-flowing tributary of Alligator Creek and part of the Ocmulgee River watershed. The east side drains via Long Branch to Lime Sink Creek, a tributary of Alligator Creek and the Ocmulgee.

== Demographics ==
Historical population
Census	Pop.	Note	%±
1910	154		—
1920	274		77.9%
1930	208		−24.1%
1940	291		39.9%
1950	310		6.5%
1960	360		16.1%
1970	354		−1.7%
1980	353		−0.3%
1990	458		29.7%
2000	329		−28.2%
2010	528		60.5%
2020	381		−27.8%
U.S. Decennial Census

As of the census of 2000, there were 329 people, 136 households, and 93 families residing in the town. By 2020, its population was 381.
