= Dudley, Georgia =

- City
- Location in Laurens County and the state of Georgia
- Coordinates: 32°32′18″N 83°4′34″W
- Country: United States
- State: Georgia
- County: Laurens

Area
  - Total: 3.42 sq mi (8.86 km^{2})
  - Land: 3.41 sq mi (8.83 km^{2})
  - Water: 0.012 sq mi (0.03 km^{2})
- Elevation: 335 ft (102 m)

Population (2020)
  - Total: 593
  - Density: 174.0/sq mi (67.17/km^{2})
- Time zone: UTC-5 (Eastern (EST))
  - Summer (DST): UTC-4 (EDT)
- ZIP code: 31022
- Area code: 478
- FIPS code: 13-24488
- GNIS feature ID: 0355563
- Website: https://www.cityofdudley.com/

Dudley is a city in Laurens County, Georgia, United States. The population was 593 in 2020.

== History ==
Dudley had its start in 1891 when the railroad was extended to that point. The city was named for Senator Dudley Mays Hughes.

== Geography ==
Dudley is located in western Laurens County at 32°32′18″N 83°4′34″W (32.538345, -83.076179). U.S. Route 80 passes just north of the center of town, leading east 10 miles (16 km) to Dublin, the county seat, and west 5 miles (8 km) to Montrose. Interstate 16 passes through the south end of the city, with access from Exit 42. I-16 leads northwest 40 miles (64 km) to Macon and east 125 miles (201 km) to Savannah.

According to the United States Census Bureau, Dudley has a total area of 3.4 square miles (8.9 km^{2}), of which 0.01 square miles (0.03 km^{2}), or 0.38%, are water. The north side of the town drains to Turkey Creek, an east-flowing tributary of the Oconee River, and the south side drains via Little Rocky Creek to Rocky Creek, a tributary of Turkey Creek.

== Demographics ==
Historical population
Census	Pop.	Note	%±
1910	302		—
1920	227		−24.8%
1930	252		11.0%
1940	259		2.8%
1950	272		5.0%
1960	360		32.4%
1970	423		17.5%
1980	425		0.5%
1990	430		1.2%
2000	447		4.0%
2010	571		27.7%
2020	593		3.9%
U.S. Decennial Census

Dudley racial composition as of 2020
Race	Num.	Perc.
White (non-Hispanic)	476	80.27%
Black or African American (non-Hispanic)	94	15.85%
Native American	3	0.51%
Other/Mixed	14	2.36%
Hispanic or Latino	6	1.01%

As of the 2020 United States census, there were 593 people, 273 households, and 196 families residing in the city.
