= Eastman, Georgia =

- City
- City of Eastman
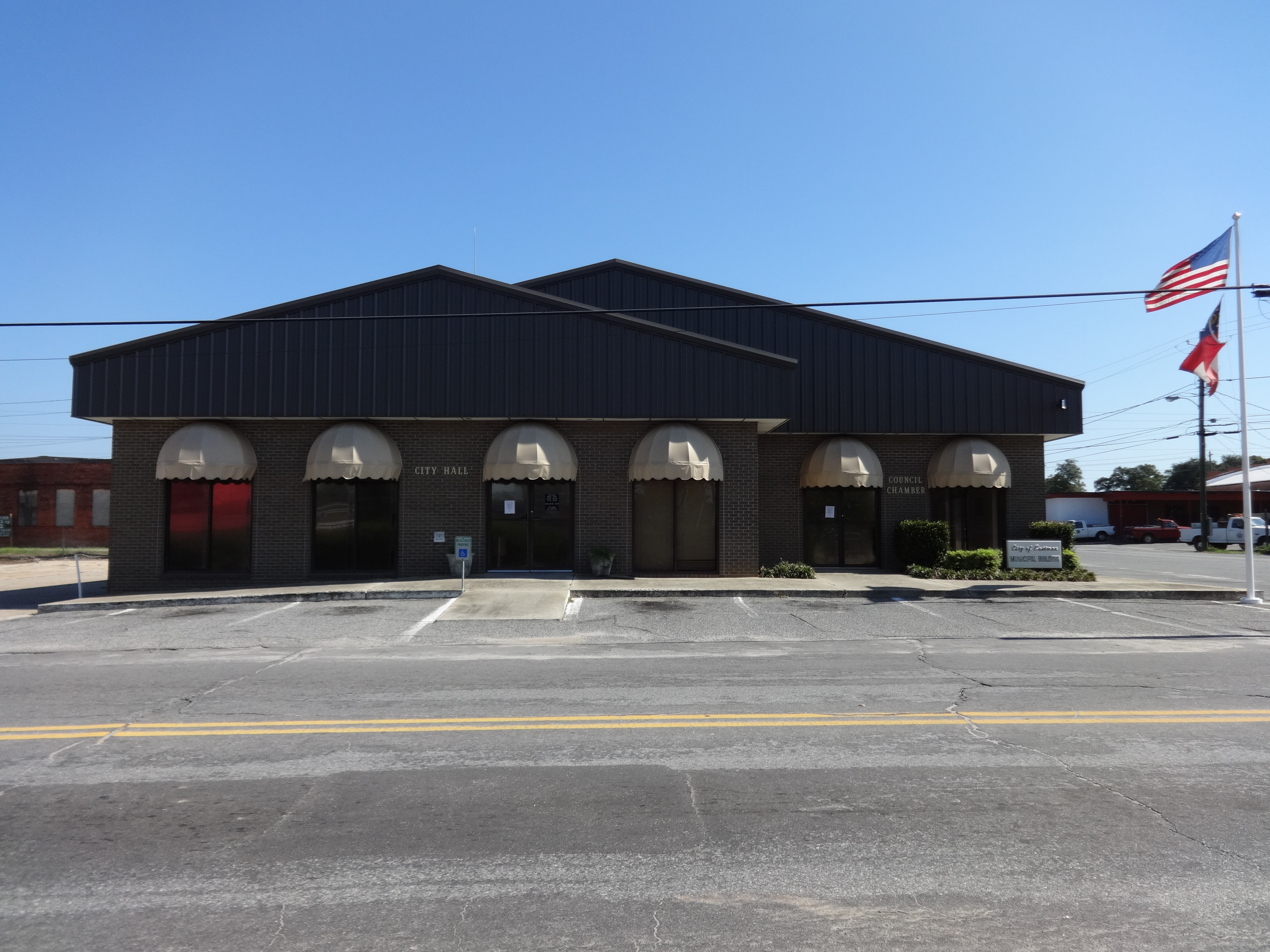
- Eastman City Hall in Eastman

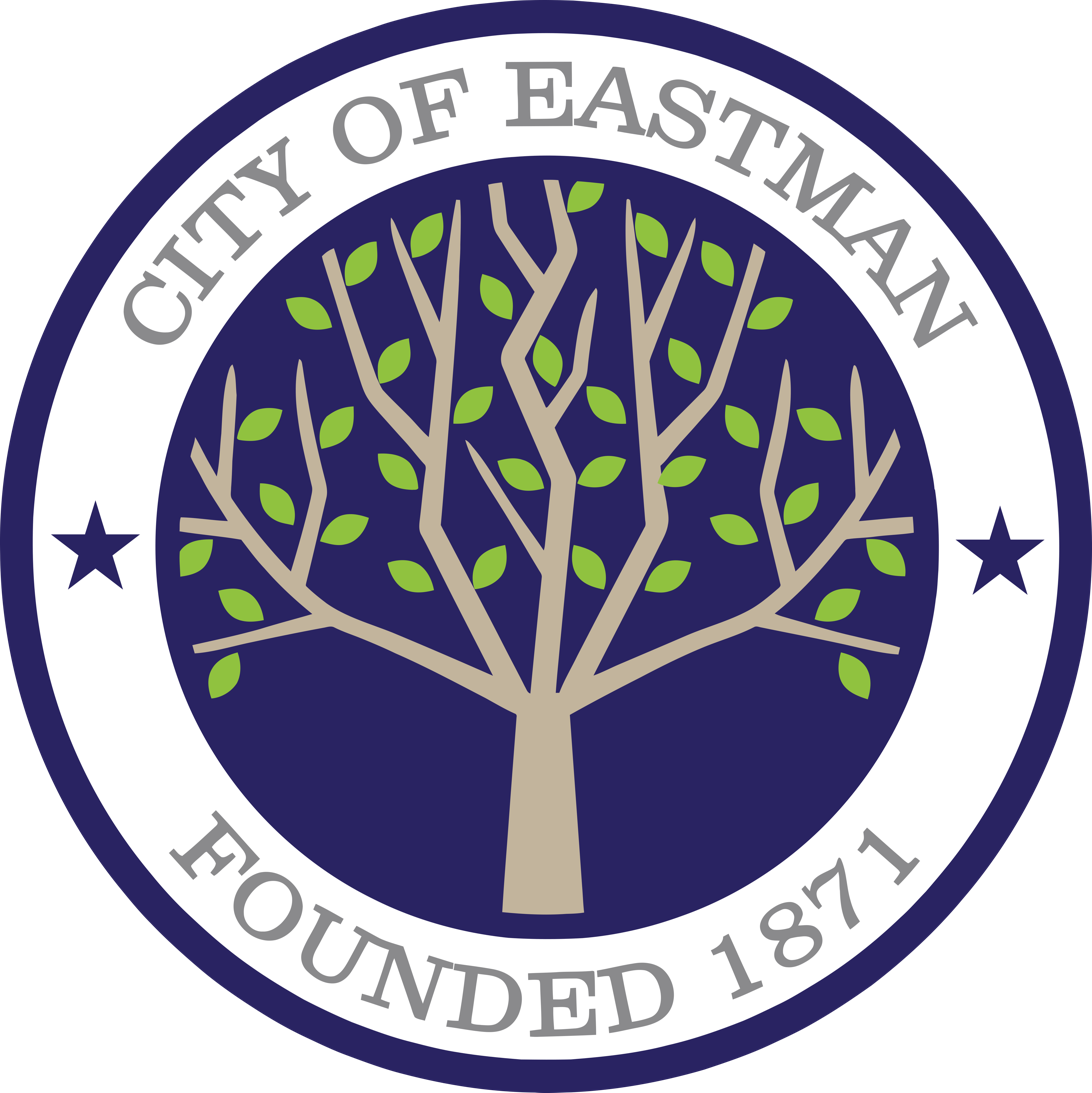
- Seal
- Nicknames: Candy Capital of Georgia, Azalea City, Paris of the Wiregrass
- Location in Dodge County and the state of Georgia
- Coordinates: 32°11′52″N 83°10′45″W
- Country: United States
- State: Georgia
- County: Dodge

Government
  - Type: Council-Manager
  - City Manager: J. Spencer Barron
  - Council Chairman: Graham Snyder
  - Council Vice-Chairman: Sebrina Williams

Area
  - Total: 6.53 sq mi (16.90 km^{2})
  - Land: 6.47 sq mi (16.75 km^{2})
  - Water: 0.062 sq mi (0.16 km^{2})
- Elevation: 390 ft (119 m)

Population (2020)
  - Total: 5,658
  - Density: 875.0/sq mi (337.84/km^{2})
- Time zone: UTC-5 (EST)
  - Summer (DST): UTC-4 (EDT)
- ZIP code: 31023
- Area code: 478
- FIPS code: 13-25552
- GNIS feature ID: 0355610
- Website: cityofeastman.com

Eastman is a city in and the county seat of Dodge County, Georgia, United States. The population was 5,658 at the 2020 census, up from 4,962 at the 2010 census. The city was named after William Pitt Eastman, a native of Massachusetts who purchased a large tract of land along the Macon and Brunswick Railroad, and settled a city on the site.

In the 19th century, this was a center of the timber and sawmill industry. During the Great Depression in 1937, the first Stuckey's Pecan Shoppe, once well-known along roadways throughout the United States, was founded in Eastman.

== History ==
The first permanent settlement of the area took place in 1840. The population continued to grow when, in 1869, a station was built for the newly constructed Macon and Brunswick Railroad which passed through the area, stimulating an economic boom. The settlement was originally named Levison and was renamed Eastman by December 1869. Eastman was designated as the seat of newly formed Dodge County in 1871. It was incorporated as a town in 1873 and as a city in 1905. Eastman is named for W. P. Eastman, who, with W. E. Dodge, presented the county with a courthouse.

During that same time period, Ira Roe Foster, former Quartermaster General of Georgia, operated a sawmill in Dodge County. In 1869, Foster built a residence in what would become Eastman. Foster was one of many who came to the area to participate in the timber and sawmill boom.

During the boom, it was estimated that, on average, there was one mill every two miles along the industrial corridor created by the Macon and Brunswick Railroad. Unlike earlier eras, when timber was transported downstream in large river rafts, sawmills along the industrial corridor shipped their timber by rail. In his book The New South Comes to Wiregrass Georgia 1860-1910, author Mark V. Wetherington states: "Ira R. Foster shipped lumber to Brunswick, where it was loaded onto timber schooners and transported to international markets like Liverpool, Rio de Janeiro, and Havana." When Eastman was incorporated in 1872, Foster served as its first mayor.

In the early years of the 20th century, racial tensions increased between the white and black communities in and about Eastman, resulting in a number of documented lynchings. In one instance, a man misidentified as the rapist Ed Claus was murdered before the real Claus was identified, apprehended, and lynched. In 1919, rumors that local blacks were intending to rise up and exterminate white residents, led to the murder of Eli Cooper and the burning of several black churches, which were believed to be the focal point of the uprising.

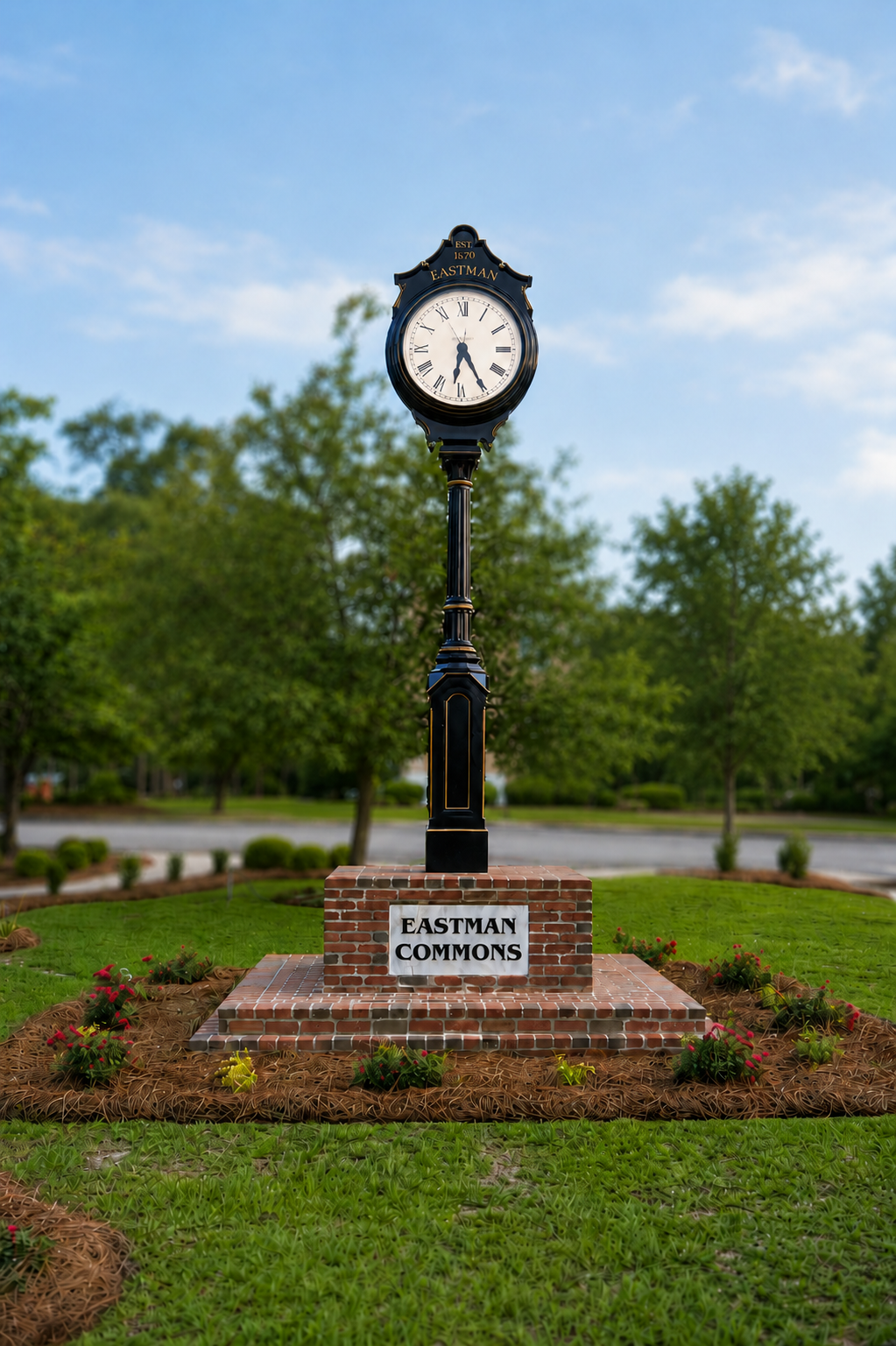
Eastman Commons Clock

== Geography ==
Eastman is located in the center of Dodge County at 32°11′52″N 83°10′45″W (32.197760, -83.179271). U.S. Route 23 passes through the center of town, leading northwest 17 miles (27 km) to Cochran and southeast 20 miles (32 km) to McRae-Helena. U.S. Route 341 bypasses the city on the southwest, leading west 20 miles (32 km) to Hawkinsville and southeast with US 23 to McRae-Helena. Sugar Creek runs to the southwest of the city.

According to the United States Census Bureau, Eastman has a total area of 5.5 square miles (14.2 km^{2}), of which 5.4 square miles (14.0 km^{2}) is land and 0.04 square miles (0.1 km^{2}), or 0.93%, is water.

=== Climate ===
Climate data for Eastman, Georgia
Month	Jan	Feb	Mar	Apr	May	Jun	Jul	Aug	Sep	Oct	Nov	Dec	Year
Record high °F (°C)	83 (28)	84 (29)	92 (33)	95 (35)	102 (39)	110 (43)	109 (43)	105 (41)	102 (39)	102 (39)	89 (32)	85 (29)	110 (43)
Mean daily maximum °F (°C)	57.0 (13.9)	61.2 (16.2)	69.9 (21.1)	77.7 (25.4)	84.4 (29.1)	84.4 (29.1)	91.5 (33.1)	91.3 (32.9)	87.1 (30.6)	78.8 (26.0)	69.7 (20.9)	60.9 (16.1)	76.6 (24.8)
Mean daily minimum °F (°C)	35.0 (1.7)	37.6 (3.1)	45.1 (7.3)	51.9 (11.1)	59.7 (15.4)	59.7 (15.4)	69.8 (21.0)	69.1 (20.6)	64.2 (17.9)	53.0 (11.7)	44.8 (7.1)	37.8 (3.2)	52.9 (11.6)
Record low °F (°C)	−2 (−19)	10 (−12)	15 (−9)	29 (−2)	39 (4)	45 (7)	56 (13)	52 (11)	36 (2)	28 (−2)	12 (−11)	4 (−16)	−2 (−19)
Average precipitation inches (mm)	5.05 (128)	4.38 (111)	4.84 (123)	3.58 (91)	2.93 (74)	4.53 (115)	5.12 (130)	3.90 (99)	3.33 (85)	2.73 (69)	3.18 (81)	3.67 (93)	46.40 (1,179)
Source 1: The Weather Channel
Source 2: Weatherbase

== Demographics ==
Historical population
Census	Pop.	Note	%±
1890	1,082		—
1900	1,235		14.1%
1910	2,355		90.7%
1920	2,707		14.9%
1930	3,022		11.6%
1940	3,311		9.6%
1950	3,597		8.6%
1960	5,118		42.3%
1970	5,416		5.8%
1980	5,330		−1.6%
1990	5,153		−3.3%
2000	5,440		5.6%
2010	4,962		−8.8%
2020	5,658		14.0%
U.S. Decennial Census

=== Racial and ethnic composition ===
Eastman city, Georgia – Racial and ethnic composition Note: the US Census treats Hispanic/Latino as an ethnic category. This table excludes Latinos from the racial categories and assigns them to a separate category. Hispanics/Latinos may be of any race.
Race / Ethnicity (NH = Non-Hispanic)	Pop 2000	Pop 2010	Pop 2020	% 2000	% 2010	% 2020
White alone (NH)	3,254	2,836	2,778	59.82%	57.15%	49.10%
Black or African American alone (NH)	2,026	1,787	2,399	37.24%	36.01%	42.40%
Native American or Alaska Native alone (NH)	12	13	5	0.22%	0.26%	0.09%
Asian alone (NH)	26	50	54	0.48%	1.01%	0.95%
Native Hawaiian or Pacific Islander alone (NH)	3	0	4	0.06%	0.00%	0.07%
Other race alone (NH)	1	1	22	0.02%	0.02%	0.39%
Mixed race or Multiracial (NH)	20	40	160	0.37%	0.81%	2.83%
Hispanic or Latino (any race)	98	235	236	1.80%	4.74%	4.17%
Total	5,440	4,962	5,658	100.00%	100.00%	100.00%

=== 2020 census ===
As of the 2020 census, Eastman had a population of 5,658. The median age was 37.6 years. 24.0% of residents were under the age of 18 and 17.9% of residents were 65 years of age or older. For every 100 females there were 88.0 males, and for every 100 females age 18 and over there were 85.0 males age 18 and over.

95.4% of residents lived in urban areas, while 4.6% lived in rural areas.

There were 2,262 households in Eastman, including 1,343 families. Of these households, 31.9% had children under the age of 18 living in them. Of all households, 31.5% were married-couple households, 20.1% were households with a male householder and no spouse or partner present, and 42.2% were households with a female householder and no spouse or partner present. About 35.7% of all households were made up of individuals and 15.8% had someone living alone who was 65 years of age or older.

There were 2,473 housing units, of which 8.5% were vacant. The homeowner vacancy rate was 1.0% and the rental vacancy rate was 4.5%.

== Recreation ==
Eastman has few recreational activities. The Dodge County Golf Club has a 9-hole golf course, a swimming pool and private golf cart selection. It is positioned next to the railroad tracks that run through the town. The Eastman-Dodge County Recreational Fields, located along the Eastman-Dublin Highway (Highway 117), offers the following public sports for kids: football, baseball, tee ball, cheerleading, soccer, and girl's flag football.

== Education ==
=== Dodge County School District ===
Dodge County students in kindergarten to twelfth grades are in the Dodge County School District, which consists of a pre-K school, two elementary schools, a middle school, and a high school. The district has 210 full-time teachers and over 3,500 students.

- Dodge County Achievement Center/Performance Learning Center (DAC/PLC)
- Dodge County Primary School (Pre-K/2nd)
- Dodge County Elementary School (3rd/5th)
- Dodge County Middle School
- Dodge County High School

=== Higher education ===
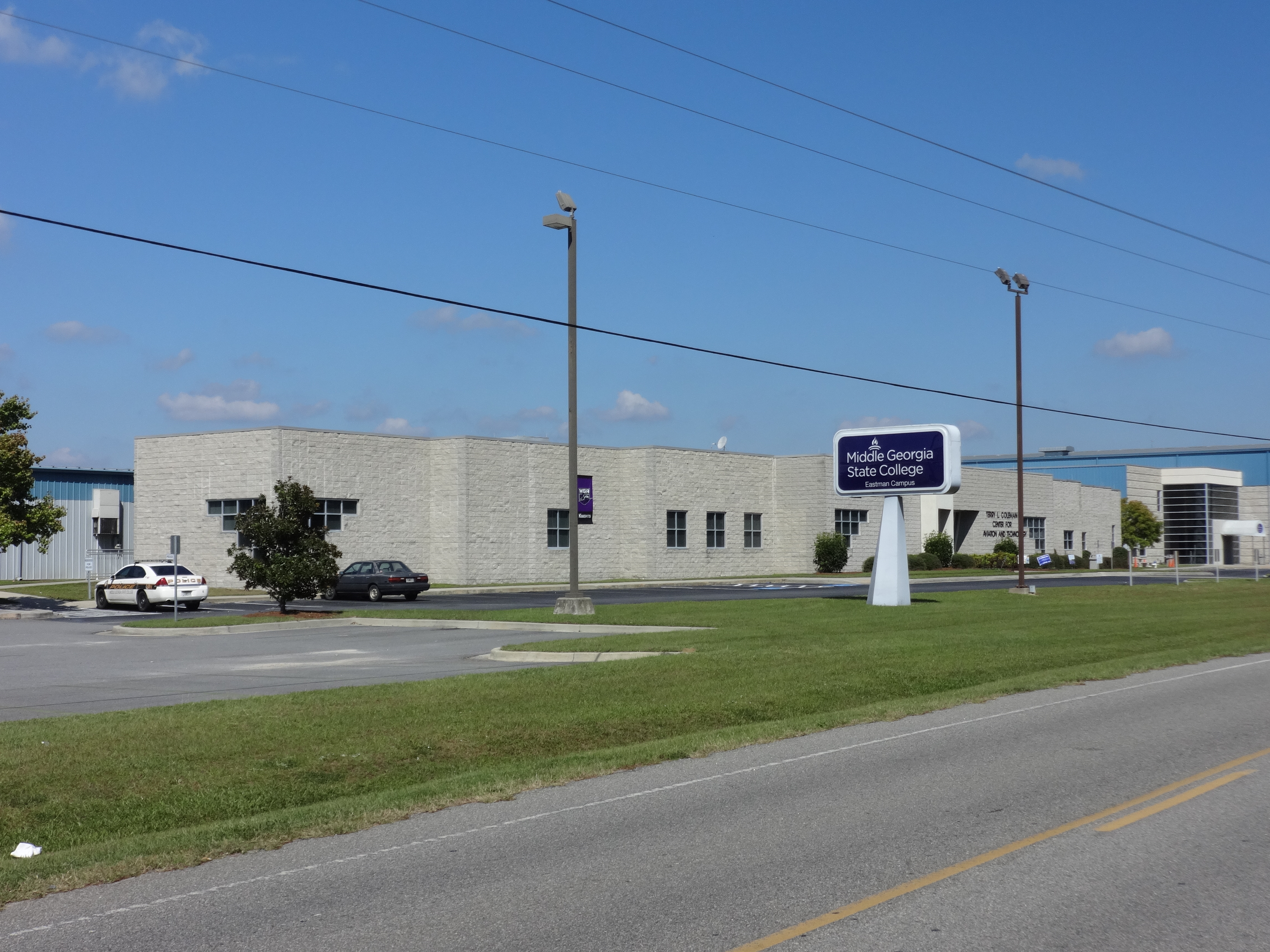
Middle Georgia State University - Eastman Campus at the Heart of Georgia Regional Airport

- Middle Georgia State University — Georgia Aviation Campus (previously known as Georgia Aviation Technical College before it merged with the Middle Georgia College).

=== Peabody School ===
Peabody School, also known as Peabody High School, is an historic school building located on Herman Avenue in Eastman, Georgia. Built in 1938, it was designed by Eastman-born American architect Edward Columbus Hosford, who is noted for the courthouses and other buildings that he designed in Florida, Georgia and Texas. In the days of segregation, it was an all-black public school. It was closed in 1970 and its students were integrated into Dodge County High School and other formerly all-white public schools in Dodge County.

On November 20, 2004, the building was added to the National Register of Historic Places. It was then vacant and in private ownership.

== Transportation ==
=== Aviation ===
The Heart of Georgia Regional Airport (ICAO: KEZM, FAA LID: EZM) serves as a general aviation airport in Eastman, on the city's eastern edge near SR 46. The airport was built in 1966 to accommodate the expanding business needs of Stuckey's. The airport is home to Middle Georgia State University's Georgia Aviation Center, the only state-supported aviation college in Georgia.

=== Highway ===
- US 23
- US 341
- SR 27
- SR 46
- SR 87
- SR 117

== Notable people ==
- Terry Coleman — Speaker of the House for 2003-2004 Legislative Session of Georgia General Assembly
- Leonard Floyd — linebacker for NFL's Atlanta Falcons, formerly Chicago Bears, Los Angeles Rams, Buffalo Bills, and San Francisco 49ers
- Ira Roe Foster — 19th century polymath, first mayor of Eastman, Quartermaster General of the State of Georgia, state senator and representative, brigadier general in Georgia Militia, built a sawmill in Dodge County
- Willie E. Gary — attorney
- Edward Columbus Hosford — architect that created courthouses; he built the Dodge County Courthouse (1908) and the Peabody School (1938)
- Martha Hudson — Olympic athlete who won the gold medal in 4 × 100 metre relay at 1960 Summer Olympic Games in Rome
- Hank Mobley — hard bop and soul jazz tenor saxophonist and composer
- Hugh Royer, Jr. — professional golfer who played on PGA Tour in 1950s, 1960s and 1970s
- Tempest Storm — stripper born Annie Blanche Banks, burlesque star, and motion picture actress
- Scott Stuckey — filmmaker and record producer in Washington, D.C.; creator of children's television show Pancake Mountain
- W. S. Stuckey, Jr. — Democratic Party member of United States House of Representatives who represented Georgia's 8th congressional district (1967–1977), president of Stuckey's (1958–1966) and later chairman of the board
- W. S. Stuckey, Sr. — founded Stuckey's in 1937
