= National Register of Historic Places listings in Jones County, Georgia =

This is a list of properties and districts in Jones County, Georgia that are listed on the National Register of Historic Places (NRHP).

This National Park Service list is complete through NPS recent listings posted March 14, 2025.

== Current listings ==
	Name on the Register	Image	Date listed	Location	City or town	Description
1	Cabaniss-Hanberry House	Cabaniss-Hanberry House	January 1, 1976 (#76000639)	NE of Bradley on Transquilla Rd. 33°05′54″N 83°33′05″W	Bradley	
2	Cabiness-Hunt House		May 2, 1975 (#75000598)	SE of Round Oak off GA 11; 33°05′16″N 83°31′48″W	Round Oak	Note: the house is probably closer to 33.1107N, 83.6144W
3	Lemuel and Mary James House	Lemuel and Mary James House	May 14, 2013 (#13000271)	153 James Rd. 32°58′01″N 83°28′26″W	James	Built ca. 1885
4	Jarrell Plantation	Jarrell Plantation	May 9, 1973 (#73000624)	6 mi. E of East Juliette off Dames Ferry Rd. 33°03′07″N 83°43′30″W	East Juliette	Well-preserved "middle class" plantation, a Georgia State Historic Site
5	Jones County Courthouse	Jones County Courthouse	September 18, 1980 (#80001102)	GA 49; 33°00′30″N 83°32′12″W	Gray	
6	Jones County High School	Jones County High School	May 12, 1999 (#99000555)	Clinton St. 33°00′27″N 83°32′18″W	Gray	Now the W.E. Knox Civic Center
7	Old Clinton Historic District	Old Clinton Historic District	September 12, 1974 (#74000690)	Runs along US 129 and SR 11; 32°59′48″N 83°33′32″W	Clinton	
8	Roberts-Bush-Roberts House	Roberts-Bush-Roberts House	June 30, 2015 (#15000361)	157 Eatonton Hwy. 33°00′52″N 83°31′58″W	Gray	description^{[usurped]}
9	Herman and Allene Shaver House	Herman and Allene Shaver House	October 9, 2013 (#13000813)	1421 Monticello Hwy. 33°03′35″N 83°36′19″W	Wayside	
