= Lynching of James and Alonzo Green =

1915 lynchings in Jones County, Georgia, U.S.

Lynching of Father and son Alonzo and James Green
- Part of Jim Crow Era
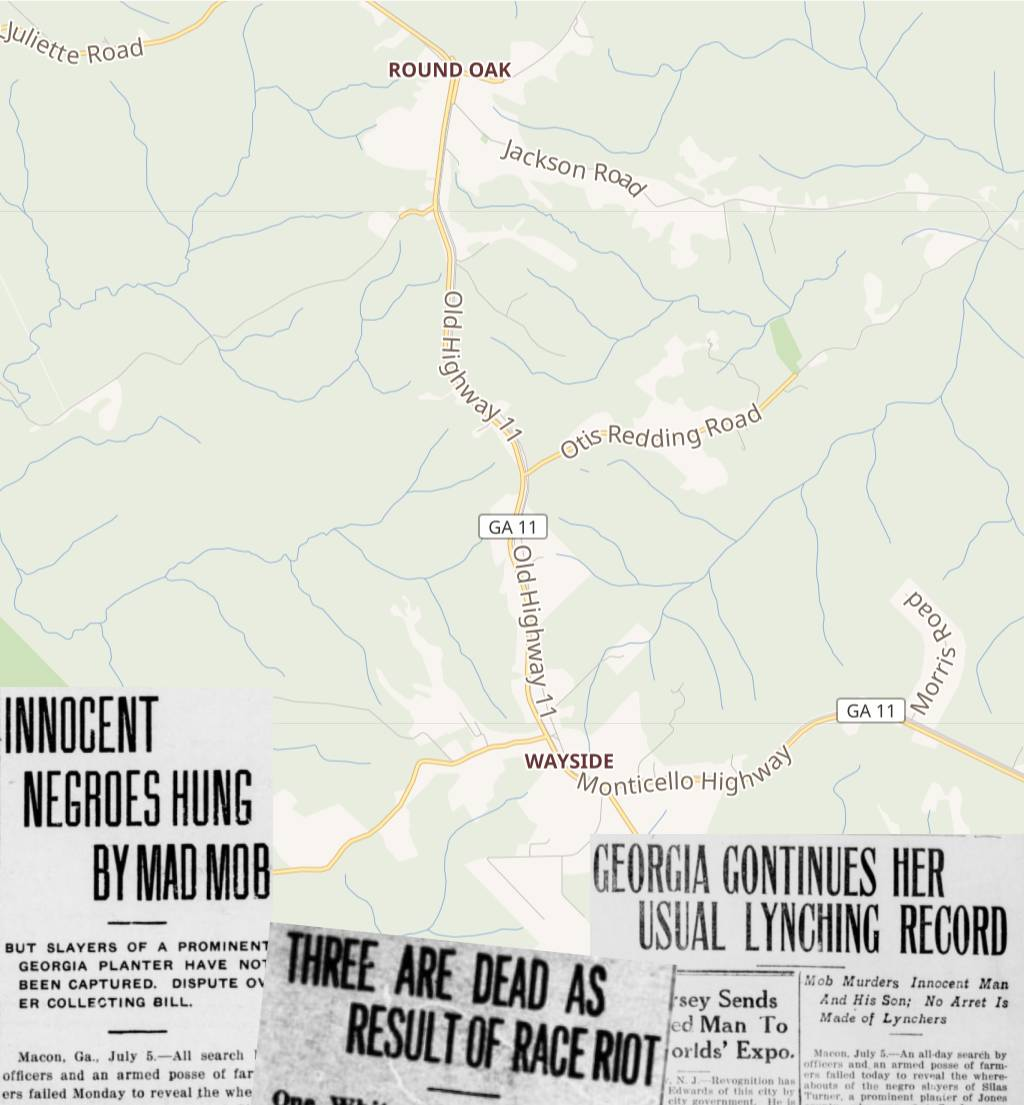
- July 1915 US News coverage of the Lynching of Father and son Alonzo and James Green
- Date: July 4, 1915
- Location: Jones County, Georgia
- Participants: A mob 500 white strong from Jones County, Georgia
- Deaths: 3

Alonzo and James D. Green were innocent father-and-son African-Americans lynched near Round Oak and Wayside, Jones County, Georgia in retaliation for the murder of popular white farmer Silas Hardin Turner on July 4, 1915. A third man, William Bostick, was also lynched on this day. None of those killed received a trial.

== Background ==
Alonzo Green worked as an axeman in a local sawmill. He had married Cora in 1902 and had two children James D. (born about 1901) and Annie M. (born about 1903). White farmer Silas Hardin Turner was a prominent planter in Jones County, Georgia and the son of John D. Turner (1851–1930) and Mattie Hardin (1865–1946).

== Lynching ==
Silas Turner was reportedly attempting to collect a debt from someone in the house of W. H. King when he was allegedly murdered by a Black man on the morning of Sunday, July 4, 1915. A White mob, some 500 men strong, quickly formed and rounded up the local black population. The Tampa Tribune reported that local Sheriff Etheridge and his deputies hunted for the murderers of Turner. The mob killed father and son Alonzo and James D. Green. To prevent word of the lynching from reaching the outside world the lines of communication were cut. Sheriff Etheridge was quoted as saying that Alonzo and James Green had nothing to do with the murder of Turner. After the lynching, Sheriff Etheridge brought in three suspects for Turner's murder, Will Gordon, Scott Farr, and Squire Thomas.

Alonzo's wife was eight-months pregnant with their daughter.

== Aftermath ==
In the Jim Crow Era a documented around 675 people lost their lives to lynchings in Georgia. A few of these are listed below:

| Date | Place | Event | Death toll | Property Damage |
|---|---|---|---|---|
| February 8, 1919 | Blakeley, Georgia | Race Riot | 4 killed | |
| April 13–15, 1919 | Jenkins County, Georgia | Race Riot | 6 killed | 3 black Masonic lodges and 7 black churches burned down |
| May 10, 1919 | Sylvester, Georgia | Race Riot | 1 killed | |
| May 27–29, 1919 | Putnam County, Georgia | Arson attack | | 2 black Masonic lodges and 5 black churches burned down |
| July 6, 1919 | Dublin, Georgia | Black protection group prevents lynching | | |
| August 27–29 | Laurens County, Georgia | Race Riot | 1 killed | 1 black Masonic lodges and 3 black churches burned down |

Four years after the Green family lynchings these race riots were one of several incidents of civil unrest that began in the so-called American Red Summer of 1919, which included terrorist attacks on black communities and white oppression in over three dozen cities and counties. In most cases, white mobs attacked African American neighborhoods. In some cases, black community groups resisted the attacks, especially in Chicago and Washington D.C. Most deaths occurred in rural areas during events like the Elaine massacre in Arkansas, where an estimated 100 to 240 black people and 5 white people were killed. Also in 1919 were the Chicago Race Riot and Washington D.C. race riot which killed 38 and 39 people respectively. Both had many more non-fatal injuries and extensive property damage reaching into the millions of dollars.

== National memorial ==
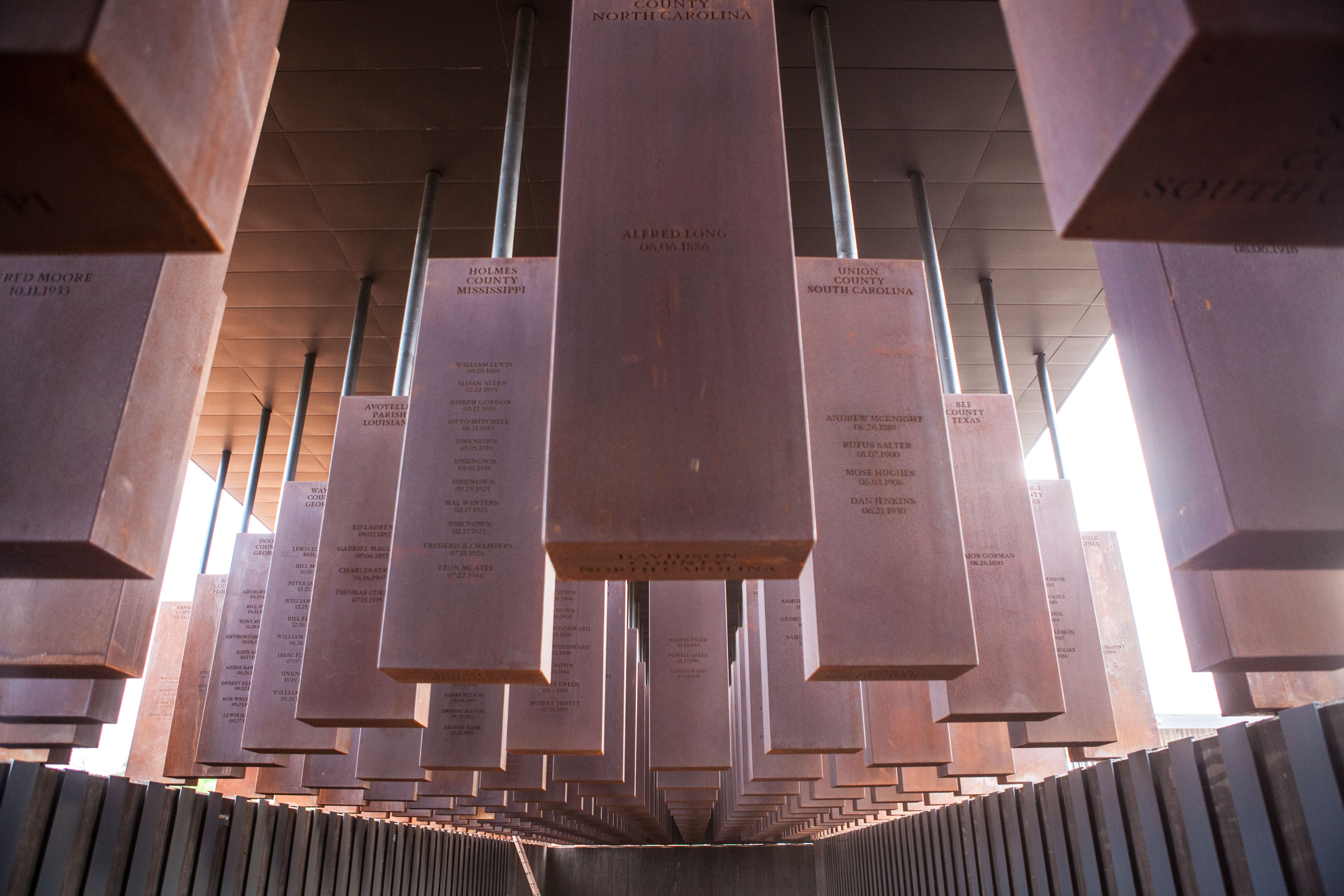
Memorial Corridor, National Memorial for Peace and Justice

The National Memorial for Peace and Justice opened in Montgomery, Alabama, on April 26, 2018, in a setting of 6 acres (2.4 ha). Featured among other things, is a sculpture by Kwame Akoto-Bamfo of a mother with a chain around her neck and an infant in her arms. On a hill overlooking the sculpture is the Memorial Corridor which displays 805 hanging steel rectangles, each representing the counties in the United States where a documented lynching took place and, for each county, the names of those lynched. For Jones County, Georgia, Alonzo and James Green, William Bostick (July 4, 1915), and John Gilham (September 3, 1918) are memorialized as lynching victims. Even though the members of the Green family stayed in the region the community did not talk about the lynching until recently when they reached out to the National Memorial for help in memorializing the lynching.

== Bibliography ==
Notes

References

- "Innocent Negroes Hung By Mad Mob". The Daily Ardmoreite. Ardmore, Oklahoma: John F. Easley. July 6, 1915. p. 8. ISSN 1065-7894. OCLC 12101538.
- Henderson, Nia-Malika (April 26, 2018). "This New Lynching Memorial Rewrites American History". CNN.
- The New York Times (October 5, 1919). "For Action on Race Riot Peril". The New York Times. New York, NY. ISSN 1553-8095. OCLC 1645522.
- Rogers, Eryn (February 11, 2019). "Jones Co. family wants to shed light on dark past". Macon, Georgia: WMAZ-TV.
- "Georgia Farmers Kill Negro Boys". The Tampa Tribune. Tampa, Florida, U.S.: Wallace Stovall. July 6, 1915. ISSN 1042-3761. OCLC 8253122.
- "Georgia continues her usual lynching record". The Tulsa Star. Tulsa Star Print. and Pub. Co. July 10, 1915. p. 8. ISSN 2163-4866. OCLC 13621345.
