= Cabaniss =

Cabaniss is a surname and a place name.

Notable people with the surname include:

- Cecelia Cabaniss Saunders (1879–1966), American educator
- Charles Cabaniss (1859–1882), Midshipman in the United States Navy and early player of American football
- Sadie Heath Cabaniss (1865–1921), American nurse
- Thomas Banks Cabaniss (1835–1915), American politician
- William J. Cabaniss (1938–2025), American politician

Places

- Cabaniss, Georgia, an unincorporated community in Monroe County, in the U.S. state of Georgia

== See also ==
- Cabanis, surname
- Cabaniss Field, the baseball stadium for the varsity baseball team of the Corpus Christi Independent School District in Texas
- Cabaniss Formation, a geologic formation in Missouri
- Cabaniss-Hanberry House, Bradley, Georgia, listed on the National Register of Historic Places (NRHP) in Jones County
- Cabaniss-Hunt House, Round Oak, Georgia, NRHP-listed in Jones County
