= Lynching of Paul Jones =

African American who was lynched in the U.S.

- Part of Red Summer
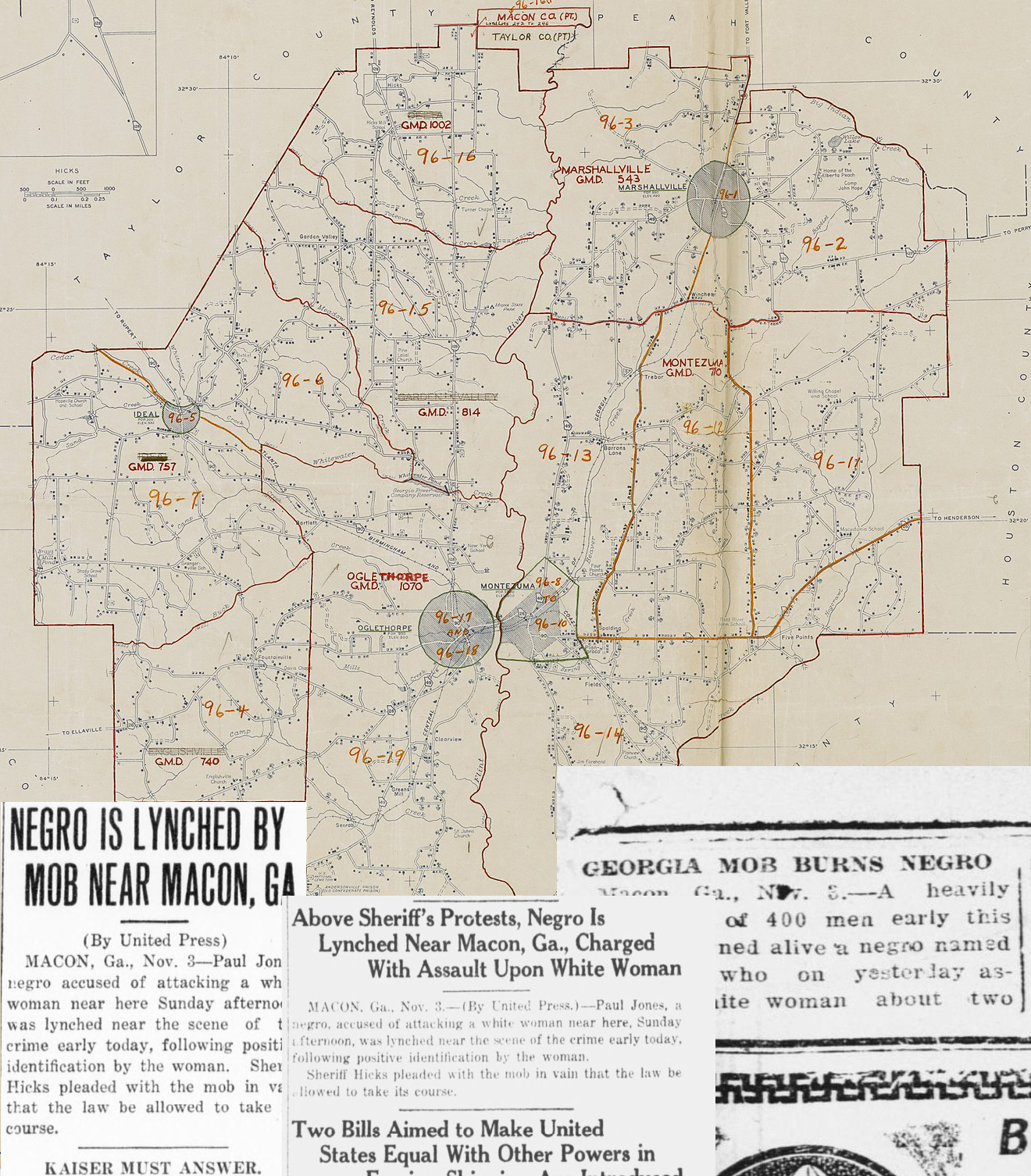
- National news coverage of the Paul Jones lynching
- Date: November 2, 1919
- Location: Macon, Georgia
- Participants: White mob in Macon, Georgia
- Deaths: 1

Paul Jones (Note: Some sources identify him as Paul Booker) was lynched on November 2, 1919, after attacking a 50-year-old white woman in Macon, Georgia.

== Lynching of Paul Jones ==
On Sunday, November 2, 1919, Paul Jones beat, choked, and attempted to rape a white woman about 2 miles (3.2 km) outside of Macon. Paul Jones was chased through town until he was cornered in a rail boxcar, where the woman positively identified him. The victim had intentionally wiped some of her blood on Jones as she was being attacked so she could identify him later. A white mob of 400 people quickly assembled and over the protests of Sheriff James R. Hicks they seized Jones. His body was riddled with bullets after being lynched, "saturated with coal oil" and lit on fire. He was still alive as the flames consumed his body and the mob watched as he writhed in pain. There were no arrests.

== Aftermath ==
These race riots were one of several incidents of civil unrest that began in the so-called American Red Summer of 1919, which included terrorist attacks on black communities and white oppression in over three dozen cities and counties. In most cases, white mobs attacked African American neighborhoods. In some cases, black community groups resisted the attacks, especially in Chicago and Washington DC. Most deaths occurred in rural areas during events like the Elaine massacre in Arkansas, where an estimated 100 to 240 black people and 5 white people were killed. Also in 1919 were the Chicago Race Riot and Washington D.C. race riot which killed 38 and 39 people respectively. Both had many more non-fatal injuries and extensive property damage reaching into the millions of dollars.

== See also ==
- Jenkins County, Georgia, riot of 1919
- Lynching of Berry Washington in Milan, Georgia
- Putnam County, Georgia, arson attack

== Bibliography ==
Notes

References

- The Daily Times (November 3, 1919). "Georgia Mob Burns Negro". The Daily Times. Wilson, North Carolina: P.D. Gold Pub. Co. pp. 1–6. ISSN 2472-2847. OCLC 25415974.
- Greeneville Daily Sun (November 3, 1919). "Above Sheriff's Protests, Negro Is Lynched Near Macon, Ga., Charged With Assault Upon White Woman". Greeneville Daily Sun. Greeneville, Greene, Tennessee: W.R. Lyon. pp. 1–4. ISSN 2475-0174. OCLC 37307396.
- McWhirter, Cameron (2011). Red Summer: The Summer of 1919 and the Awakening of Black America. Henry Holt and Company. ISBN 9781429972932. - Total pages: 368
- The New York Times (October 5, 1919). "For Action on Race Riot Peril". The New York Times. New York, NY. ISSN 1553-8095. OCLC 1645522.
- Palatka Daily News (November 3, 1919). "Negro is lynched by mob near Macon, Ga". Palatka Daily News. Palatka, Putnam, Florida: Vickers & Guerry. pp. 1–6. ISSN 0163-5050. OCLC 4402148.
