= Juliette, Georgia =

- Unincorporated community Census-designated place
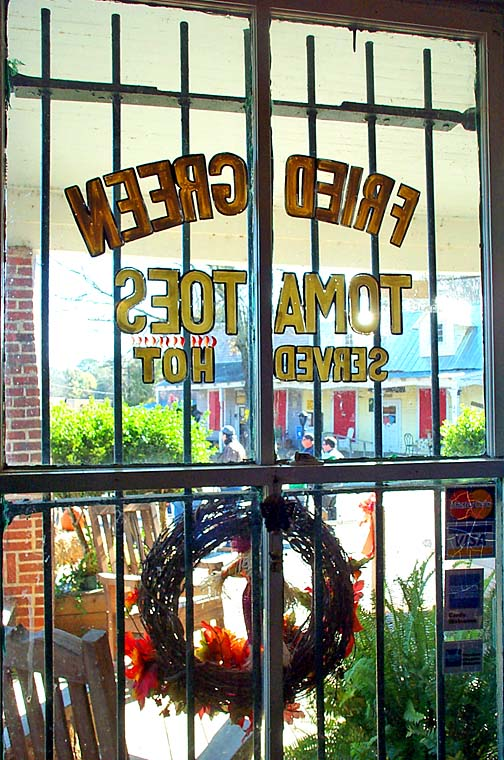
- Window at the Whistle Stop Café in Juliette

- Location within Georgia Location within the United States
- Coordinates: 33°6′25″N 83°48′0″W
- Country: United States
- State: Georgia
- County: Monroe
- Named for: Juliette McCracken

Area
  - Total: 5.0 km^{2} (1.92 sq mi)
  - Land: 4.7 km^{2} (1.83 sq mi)
  - Water: 0.23 km^{2} (0.09 sq mi)
- Elevation: 120 m (380 ft)

Population (2020)
  - Total: 290
  - Density: 61.1/km^{2} (158.2/sq mi)
- ZIP code: 31046
- Area code: 478

Juliette is an unincorporated community and census-designated place (CDP) in Monroe County, Georgia, United States. The community is part of the Macon metropolitan statistical area. Named for Juliette McCracken, daughter of a railroad engineer, the town formed with the merging of Brownsville and Iceberg. The film Fried Green Tomatoes was filmed there, and the town has been the focal point of three popular Southern humor books. After the filming of Fried Green Tomatoes, the sets used for the town's main street were renovated into a tourist district, complete with a fully operational "Whistle Stop Cafe".

Other movie productions set in Juliette were Cockfighter (1974) starring Warren Oates, A Killing Affair (1986) starring Peter Weller, The Tuskegee Airmen (1995) and the documentary Fried Green Tomorrows: Juliette, Ga. Lives (2006) directed by Neill Calabro and starring Danny Vinson. A small cafe scene set in Juliette in The War (1994) with Kevin Costner also displayed the Juliette Volunteer Fire Department.

The 2020 census listed a population of 290.

== Geography ==
Juliette is in northeastern Monroe County, on the west bank of the Ocmulgee River, which forms the Monroe–Jones County line. U.S. Route 23 passes through the west side of the community, leading southeast 23 miles (37 km) to Macon and northwest 17 miles (27 km) to Jackson. Round Oak Juliette Road crosses the Ocmulgee at Juliette and leads east 12 miles (19 km) to Round Oak.

According to the U.S. Census Bureau, the Juliette CDP has a total area of 1.9 square miles (4.9 km^{2}), of which 0.1 square miles (0.3 km^{2}), or 4.48%, are water.

== Demographics ==
Historical population
Census	Pop.	Note	%±
2020	290		—
U.S. Decennial Census; 2020

Juliette was first listed as a census designated place in the 2020 U.S. census.

Juliette CDP, Georgia – Racial and ethnic composition Note: the US Census treats Hispanic/Latino as an ethnic category. This table excludes Latinos from the racial categories and assigns them to a separate category. Hispanics/Latinos may be of any race.
Race / Ethnicity (NH = Non-Hispanic)	Pop 2020	% 2020
White alone (NH)	232	80.00%
Black or African American alone (NH)	31	10.69%
Native American or Alaska Native alone (NH)	0	0.00%
Asian alone (NH)	0	0.00%
Pacific Islander alone (NH)	0	0.00%
Some Other Race alone (NH)	0	0.00%
Mixed Race or Multi-Racial (NH)	15	5.17%
Hispanic or Latino (any race)	12	4.14%
Total	290	100.00%

== Places and events of interest ==
Less than 10 miles outside of Juliette is the Jarrell Plantation, historical site on the U.S. National Register of Historic Places with a museum and a park.

Juliette is also home to Plant Scherer, the largest coal power generation facility in the Western Hemisphere.

On February 14 of each year, the town of Juliette offers a special dual postmark with the village of Romeo, Michigan. This tradition began in 1994, as a nod to the William Shakespeare play, Romeo and Juliet.
