= Jarrell Plantation =

Historic house in Georgia, United States

- U.S. National Register of Historic Places
- U.S. Historic district
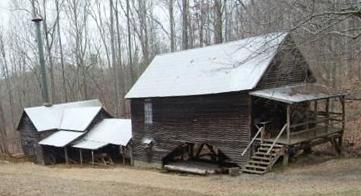

- Location within Georgia Location within the United States
- Location: 711 Jarrell Plantation Road, East Juliette, Georgia, U.S.
- Coordinates: 33°3′7″N 83°43′30″W
- Area: 200 acres (81 ha)
- Built: 1847, 1895, 1920
- Built by: John Fitz Jarrell, Benjamin Richard "Dick" Jarrell,
- NRHP reference No.: 73000624
- Added to NRHP: May 9, 1973

The Jarrell Plantation State Historic Site is a former cotton plantation and state historic site in Juliette, Georgia, United States. Founded as a forced-labor farm worked by John Jarrell and the African American people he enslaved, the site stands today as one of the best-preserved examples of a "middle class" Southern plantation. The Jarrell Plantation's buildings and artifacts all came from the Jarrell family, who farmed the land for over 140 years. Located in the red clay hills of the Georgia piedmont, It was added to the National Register of Historic Places in 1973. It is a Georgia state park in Jones County.

== History ==
Before the Civil War, John Jarrell's farm was one of the half-million cotton farms in the South that collectively produced two-thirds of the world's cotton. Like many small planters, John Jarrell benefited from the development of the cotton gin in 1793 by Eli Whitney, which made it practical to cultivate heavily seeded, short-staple cotton even in hilly, inland areas of Georgia.

John Fitz Jarrell built the first permanent structure on the site in 1847. Typical of antebellum cotton plantations, John Jarrell ran the farm with his family and the forced labor of enslaved Africans. By 1860, Jarrell was enslaving 39 people to work his 660-acre (2.7 km^{2}) farm. Although primarily a cotton plantation, the farm also provided food crops and grazing for livestock. During the turbulent decade of the 1860s, the farm survived a typhoid fever outbreak, Sherman's March to the Sea, emancipation, and Reconstruction. After the Civil War, John Jarrell continued to farm with the help of formerly enslaved people and he increased the farm to nearly 766 acres (3.10 km^{2}). The formerly enslaved people began leaving the farm in John Jarrell's final years.

After John's death in 1884 one of John's sons, Benjamin Richard "Dick" Jarrell, gave up a teaching career to return home and build his family home in 1895. Although the farm had been processing sugarcane since 1864, Dick Jarrell expanded the industrialization of the farm by adding a mill complex that eventually included a steam-driven sawmill, cotton gin, gristmill, shingle mill, and planer. In 1920, with the labor of his five sons and two nephews, Dick Jarrell completed a second home, fit for his large family. This house is a 5,000-square-foot (460 m^{2}), 1850s-style home built of heart pine.

In 1974, Dick Jarrell's nine surviving adult children donated the plantation site to the State of Georgia for the preservation of the farm and the education of future generations about their heritage. The State of Georgia's Department of Natural Resources operates the now 200-acre (810,000 m^{2}) historic site and opens it to the public Thursday through Sunday. The site's buildings and structures include the farmhouse, a sawmill, cotton gin, gristmill, shingle mill, planer, sugar cane press, syrup evaporator, workshop, barn and outbuildings.

== Images ==
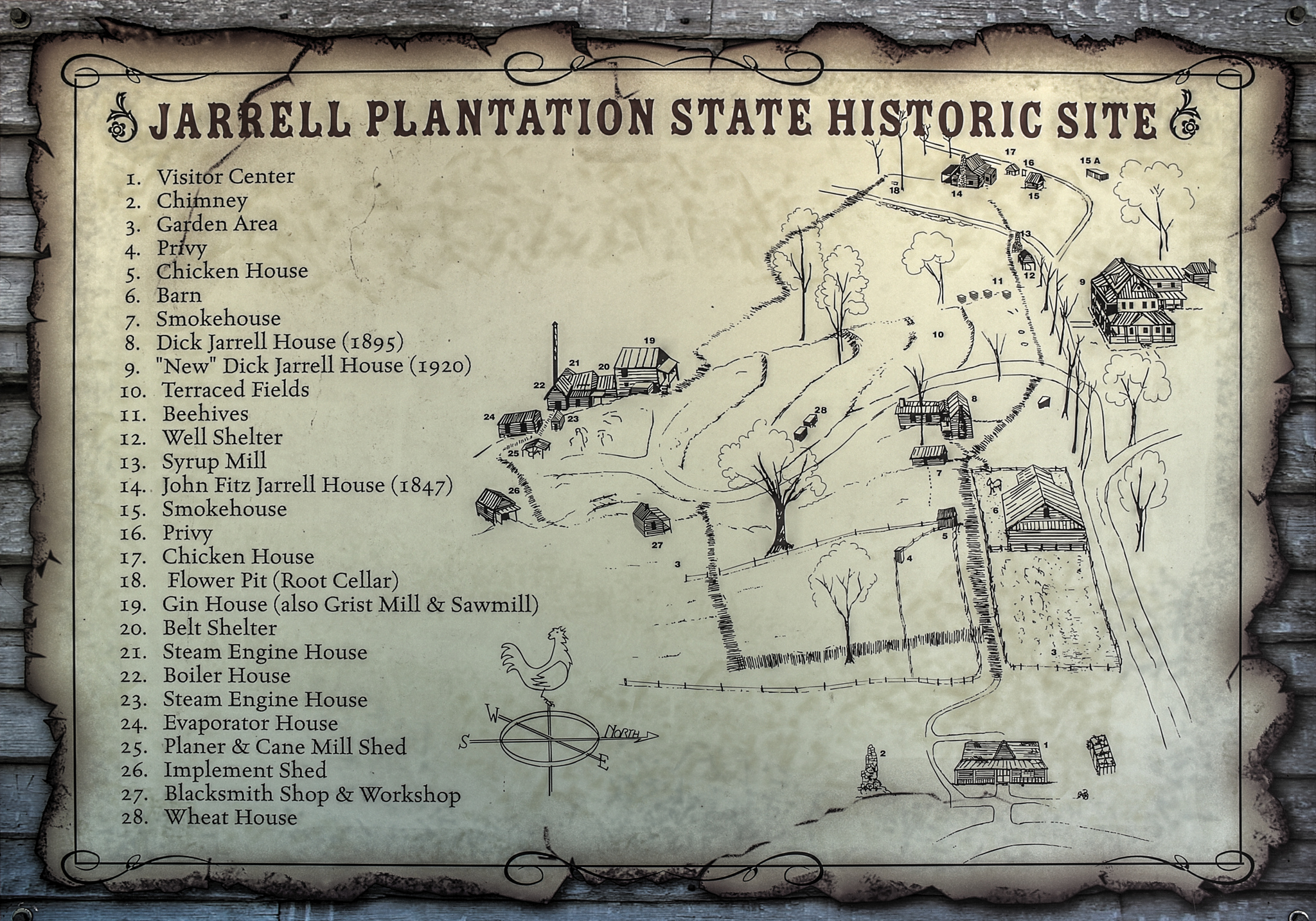
site map

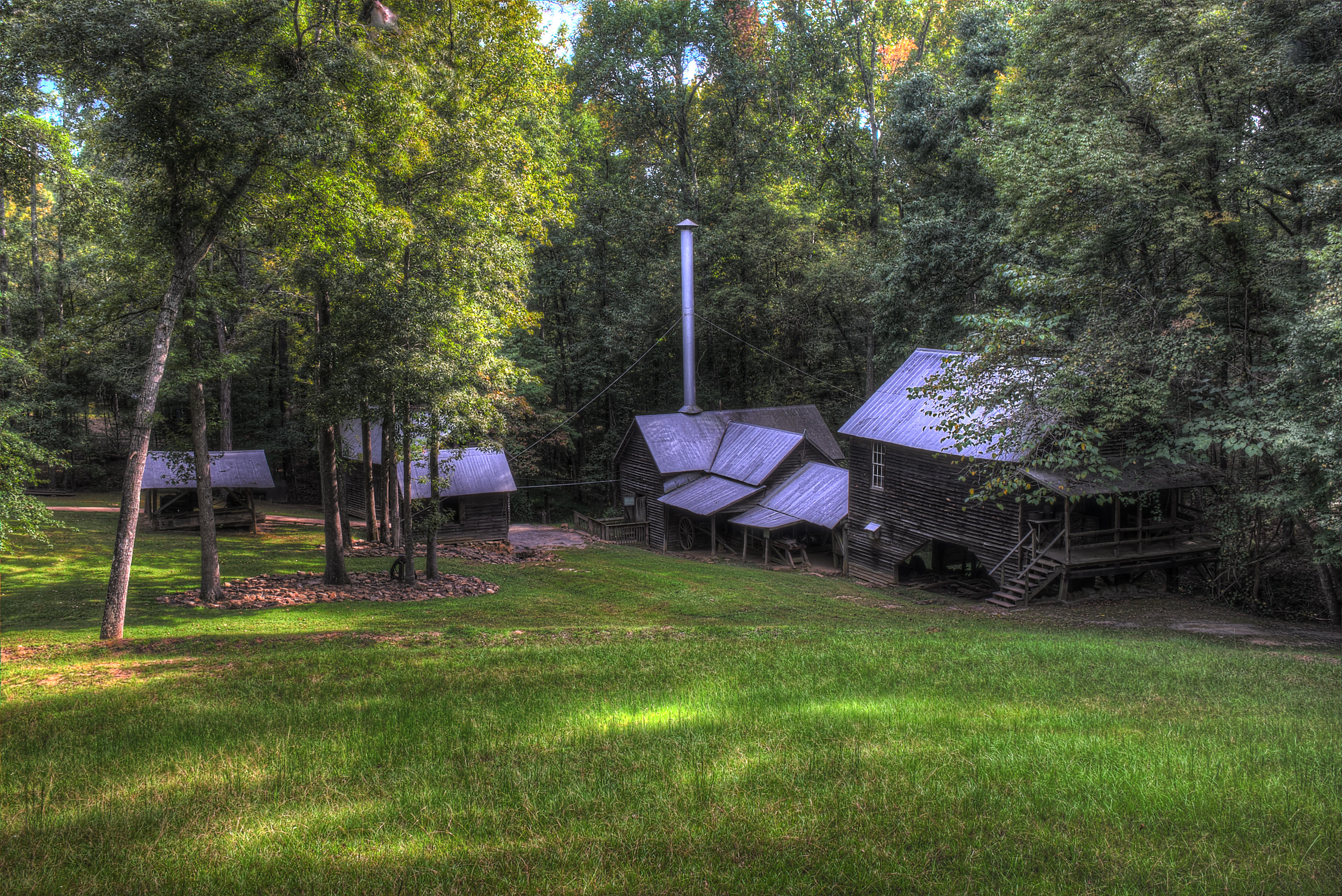
panoramic view

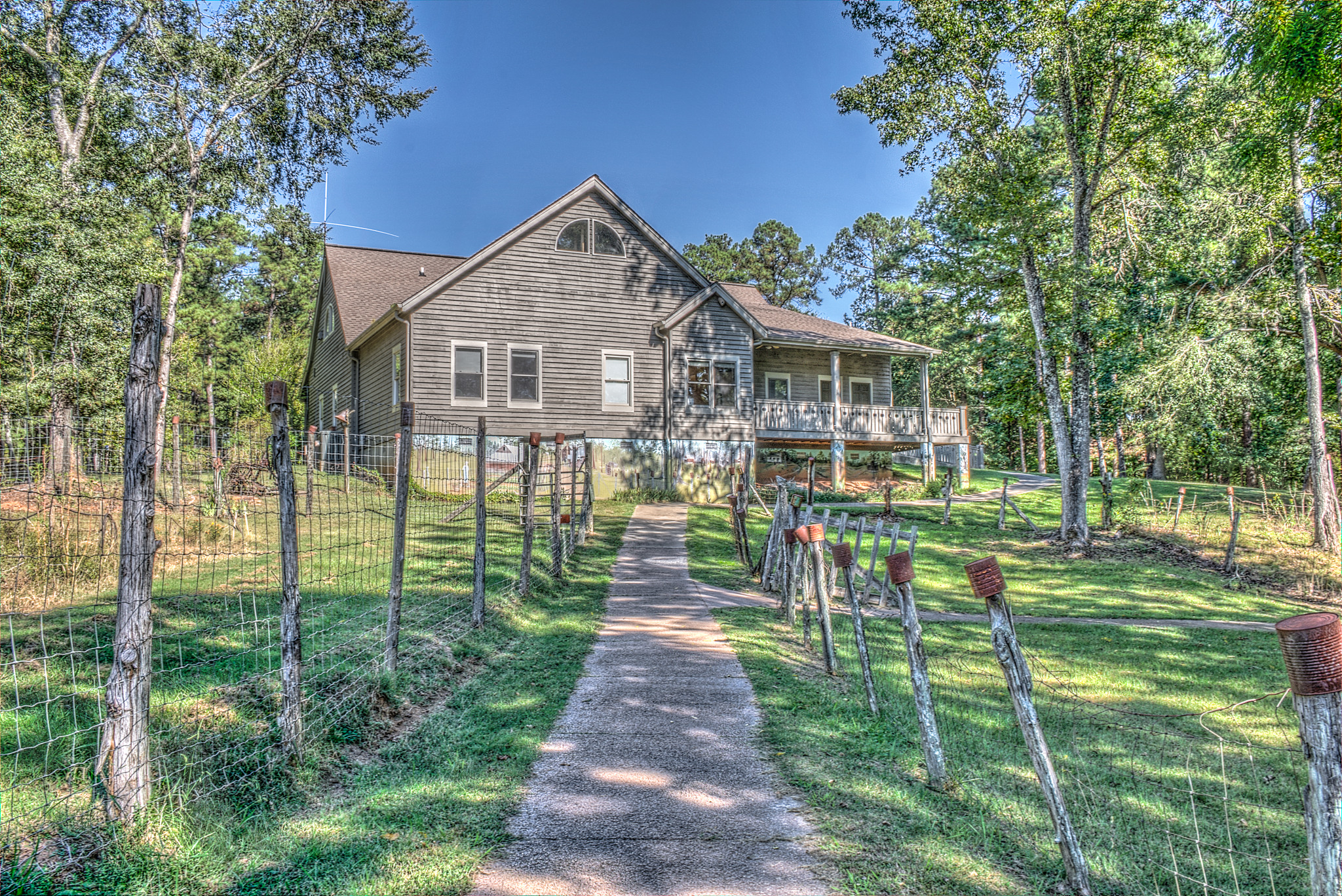
Visitor Center

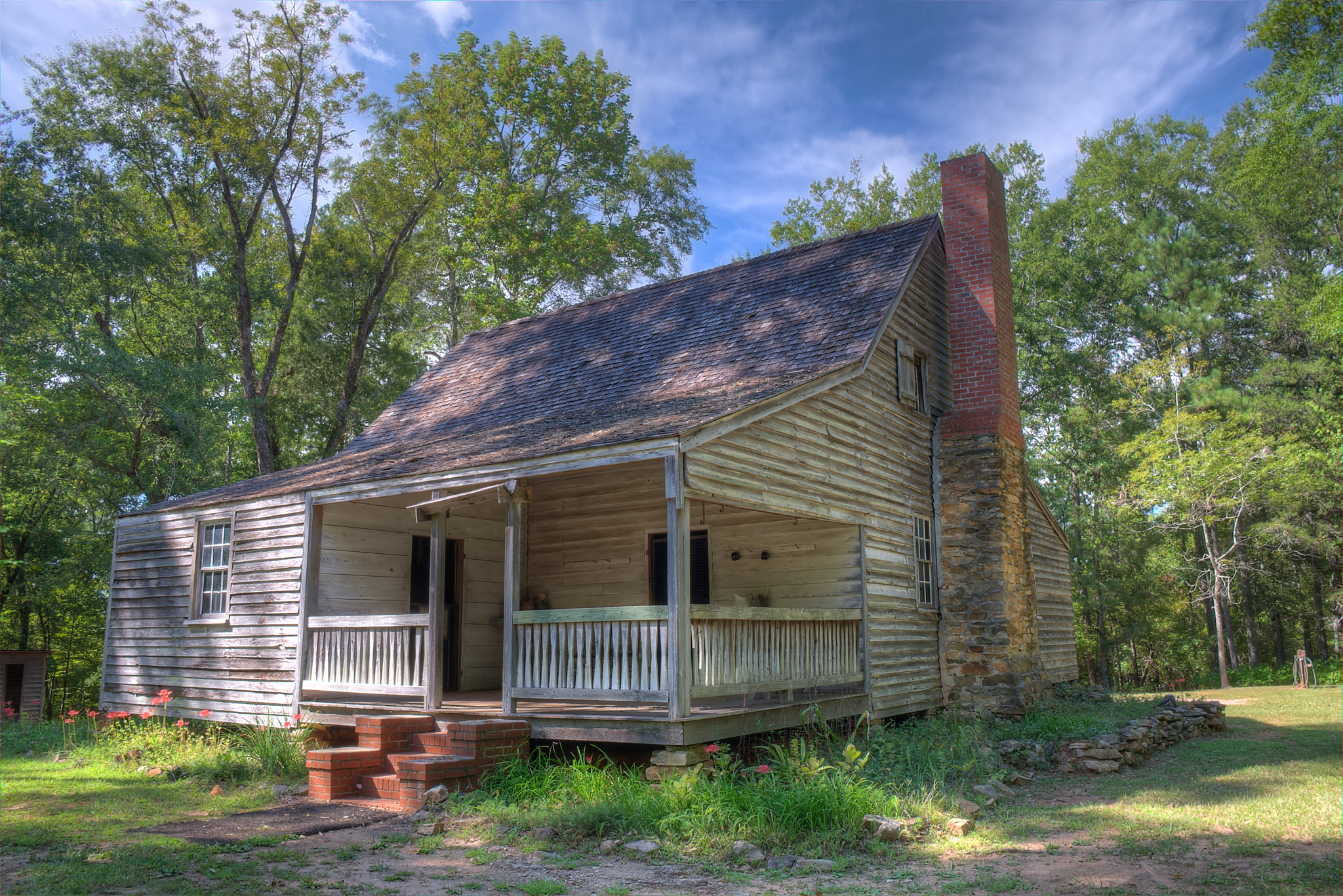
1847 house

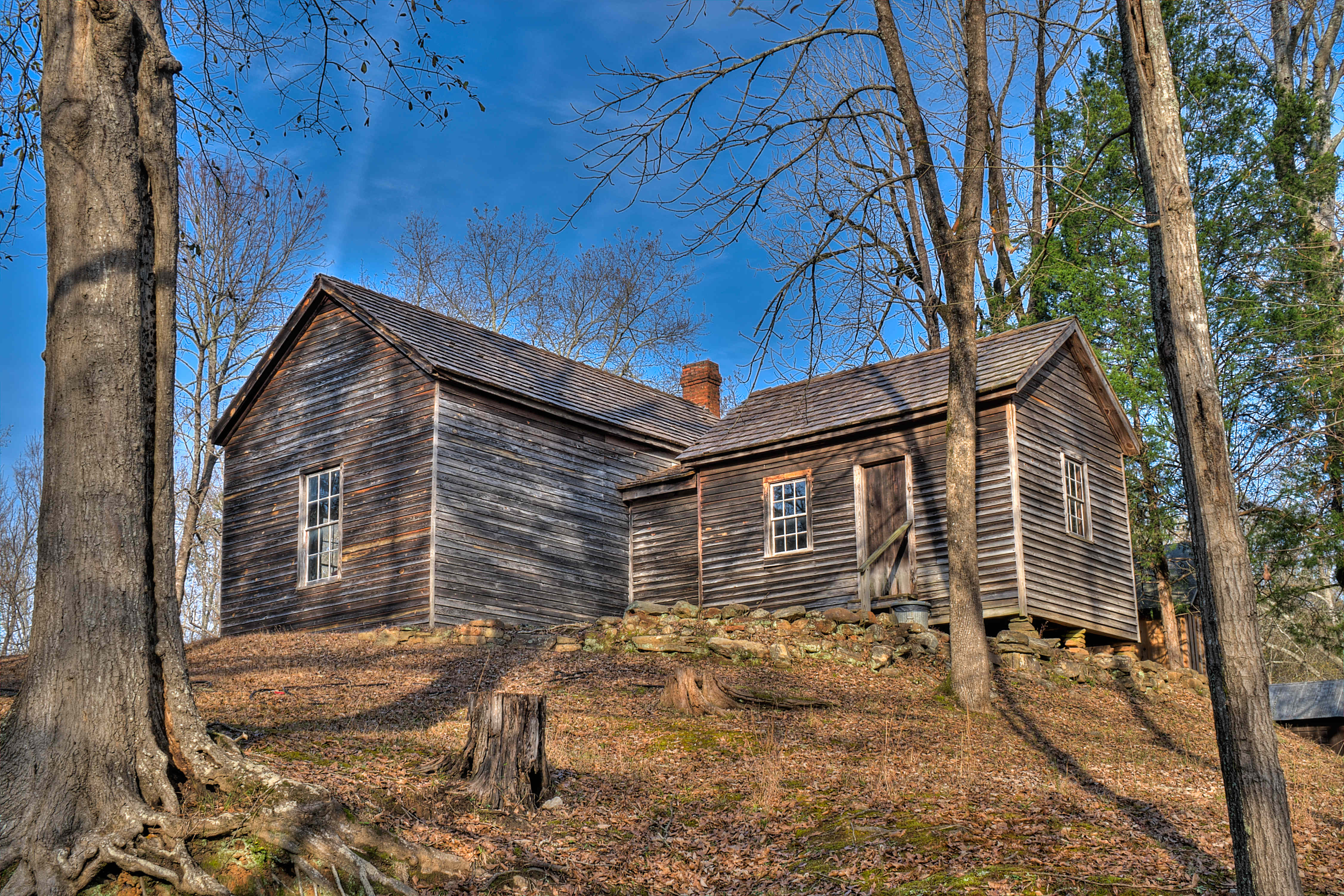
1895 house

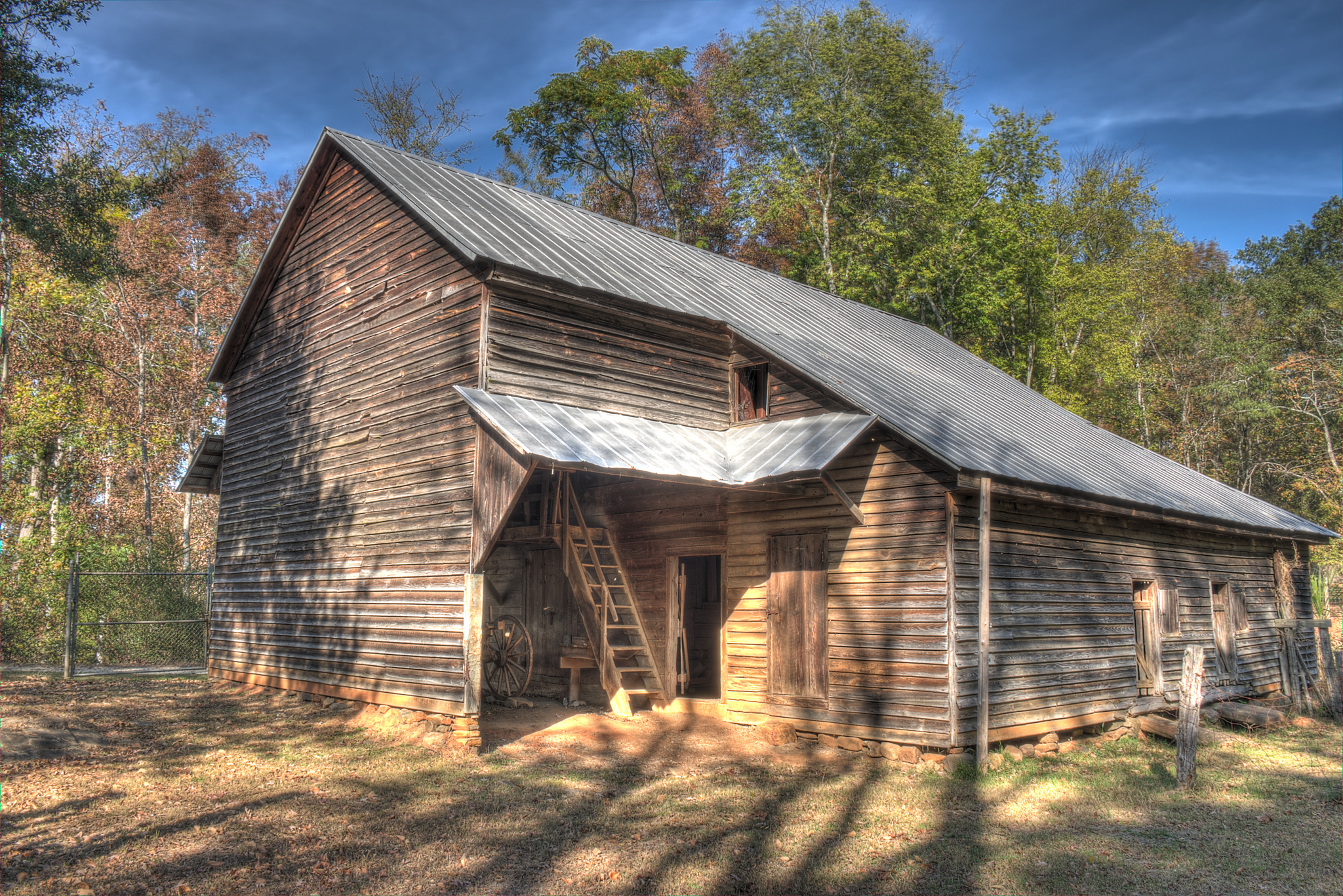
barn

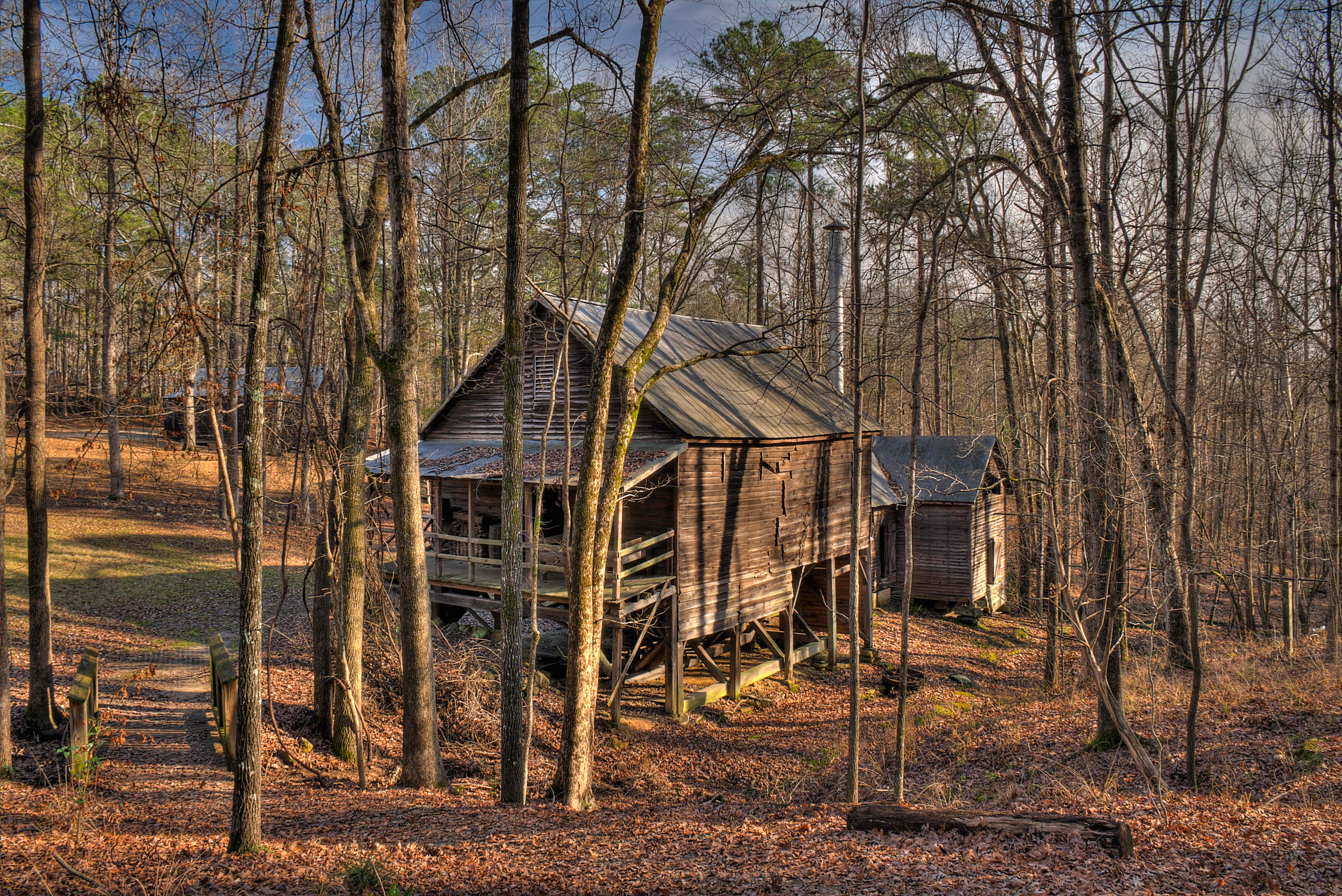
Gin house

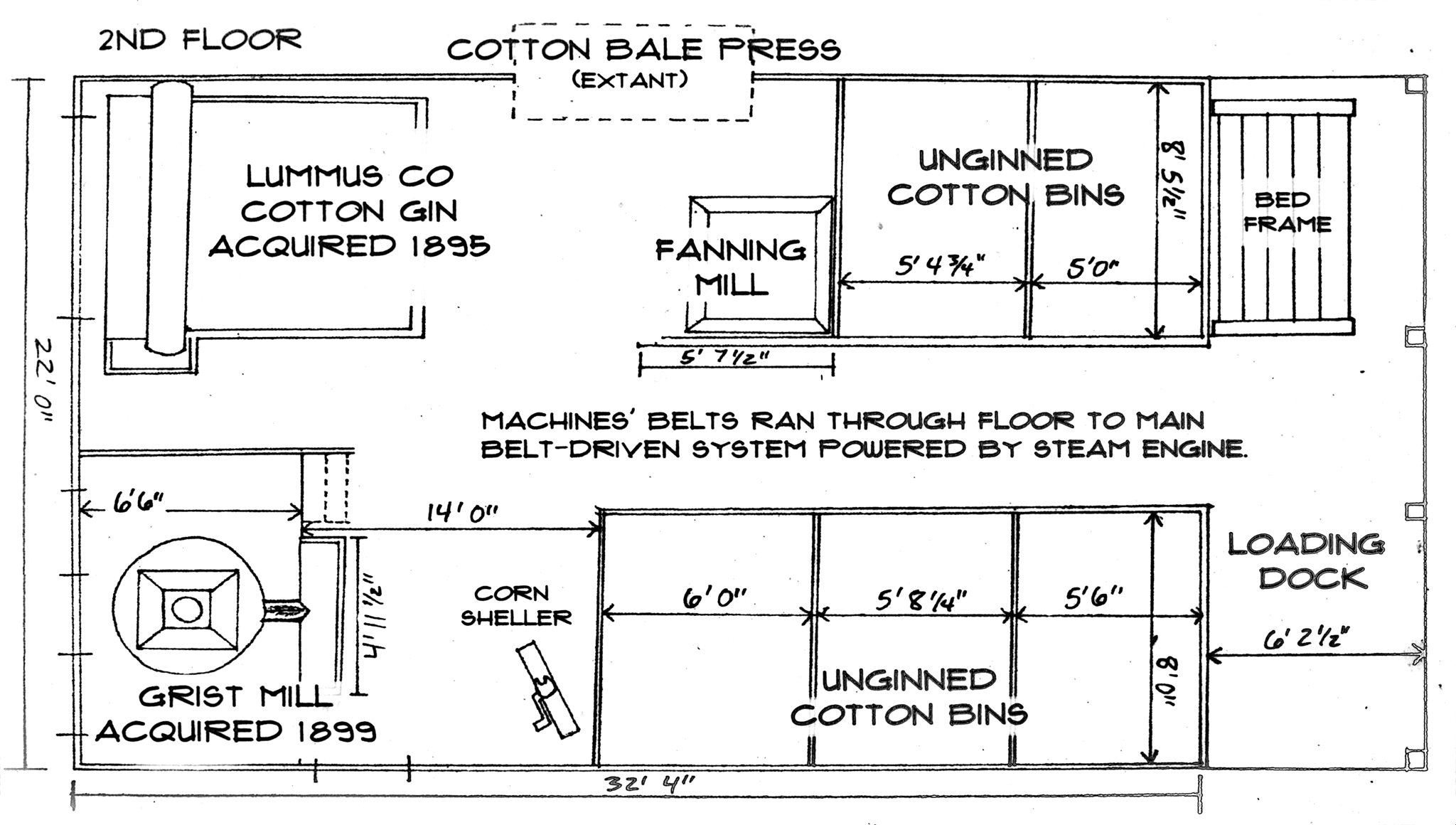
floor plan of the mill complex

== See also ==
- National Register of Historic Places listings in Jones County, Georgia
