= Chick Willis =

American blues singer and guitarist

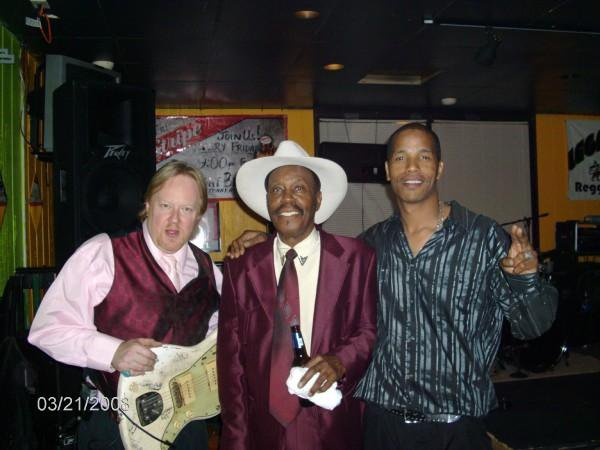
Chick Willis in 2008

Robert Lee "Chick" Willis (September 24, 1934 – December 7, 2013) was an American blues singer and guitarist, who performed and recorded from the 1950s to the 2000s.

== Biography ==
He was born in Cabaniss, Monroe County, Georgia, the cousin of Chuck Willis. He served in the military in the early 1950s, before working as a chauffeur for Chuck Willis during his heyday. He won a talent show at the Magnolia Ballroom in Atlanta and made his first record in 1956, with the Ebb Records' single "You're Mine". Initially, he only sang, but learned guitar while touring with his cousin; Guitar Slim was one of his foremost influences.

After Chuck's death in 1958, Willis played with Elmore James, recording singles through the 1960s for Atco and other labels. His 1972 release, "Stoop Down Baby Let Your Daddy See", was a jukebox hit but secured no radio airplay, due to its sexually explicit content. The song was one he had developed when working at a carnival show, where he would tease passers-by with ribald rhymes. Some of his later recordings reworked the song. Another of his dirty blues recordings was his cover of "Mother Fuyer", which appeared on his 1972 album Stoop Down Baby... Let Your Daddy See, and released as the B-side to his "Stoop Down Baby Let Your Daddy See" single on La Val Records. Willis claimed songwriting credits.

He released a steady stream of albums on Ichiban Records in the 1980s and 1990s, and continued to record into the 2000s.

He died on December 7, 2013, aged 79.

== Discography ==
- Stoop Down Baby... Let Your Daddy See (La Val), 1972)
- Chick Sings Chuck (Ichiban, 1985)
- Now (Ichiban, 1988)
- Footprints in My Bed (Ichiban, 1990)
- Back to the Blues (Ichiban, 1991)
- Holdin' Hands with the Blues (Ichiban, 1992)
- Nasty Chick (Ichiban, 1992)
- I Got a Big Fat Woman (Ichiban, 1994)
- Blue Class Blues (Paula, 1998)
- Y2K Recorded Live (Ifgam, 2000)
- From the Heart and Soul (Rock House, 2001)
- I Won't Give Up (Deep South, 2002)
- I Did it All (CML, 2005)
- Cookin' the Blues (Old School, 2006)
- The Don of the Blues (CDS, 2008)
- Hit & Run Blues (Benevolent Blues, 2009)
- Mr. Blues – The Best Of... So Far (Benevolent Blues, 2010)
