= James, Georgia =

Community in Georgia, USA

James, Georgia is a community in Jones County, Georgia near Gray, Georgia. It is a populated place, located at 32.966535°N 83.473681°W.

== History ==
A post office called James was established in 1882, and remained in operation until 1969. The community was named after Lemuel Photo James, Sr., a railroad agent.

James is the location of the Lemuel and Mary James House, which is listed on the National Register of Historic Places.
