= Lemuel and Mary James House =

Historic house in Georgia, United States

- U.S. National Register of Historic Places
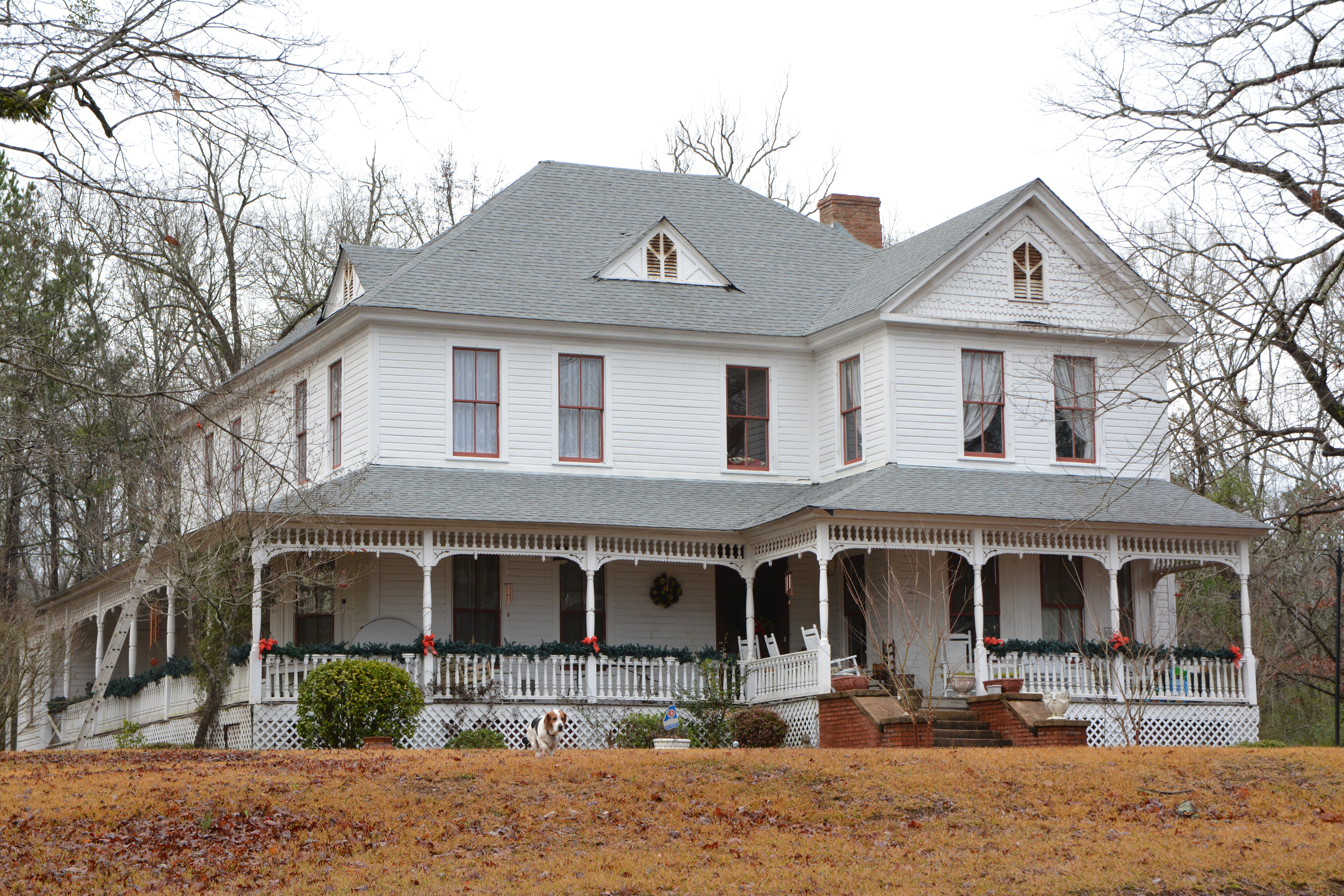

- Location within Georgia Location within the United States
- Location: 153 James Rd., James, Georgia
- Coordinates: 32.967042°N 83.47392°W
- Area: 8 acres (3.2 ha)
- Built: c.1885
- NRHP reference No.: 13000271
- Added to NRHP: May 14, 2013

The Lemuel and Mary James House was built c.1885 in James, Georgia in Jones County, Georgia. It was listed on the National Register of Historic Places in 2013.

It is a two-story house with a covered porch wrapping around two sides. It was deemed "significant in the area of architecture because it is an excellent and intact example of a Folk Victorian-style New South-type house."

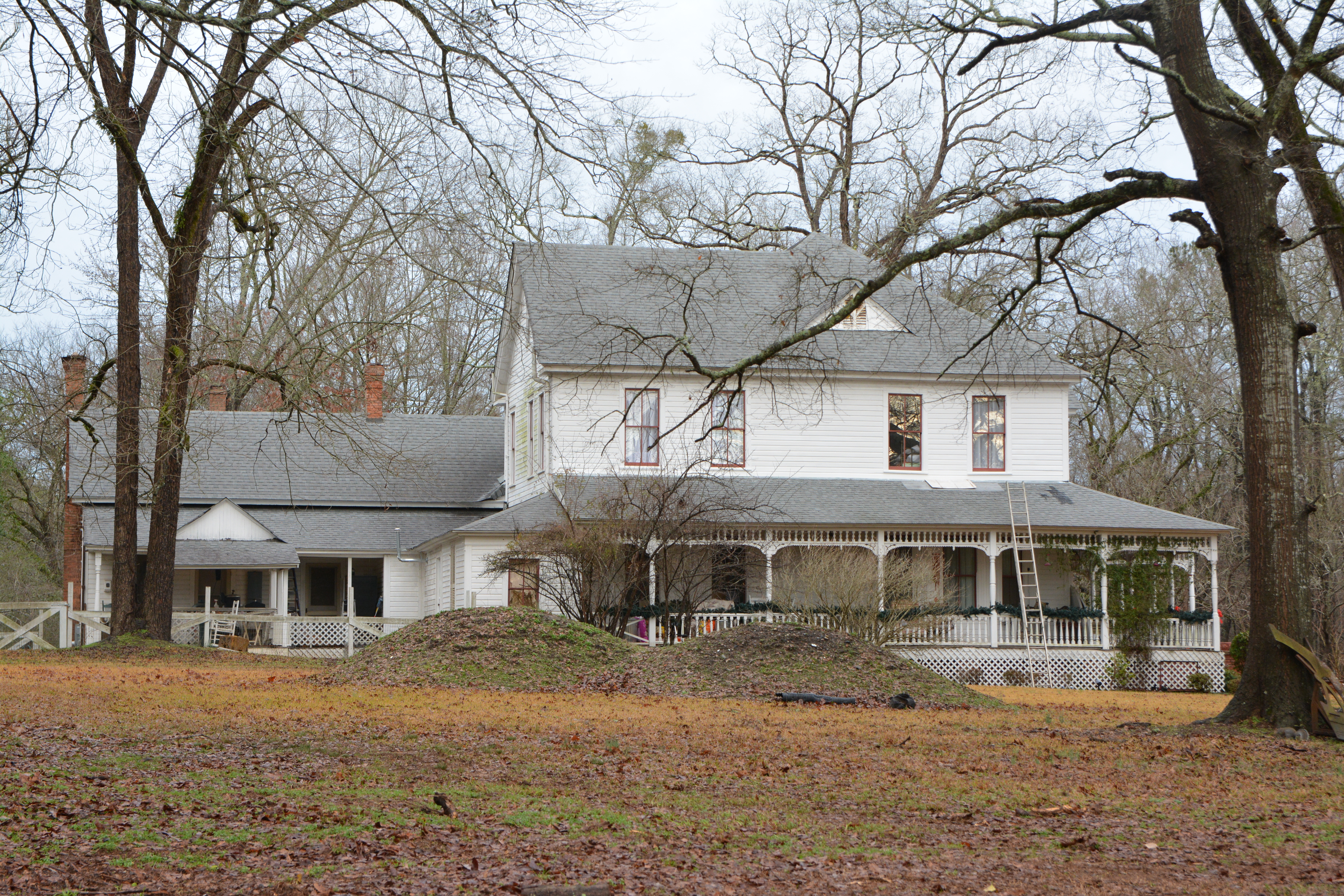

The property has four contributing buildings in addition to the house: a smoke house, a syrup house, a garage, and a storage barn.
