= Blountsville, Georgia =

Coordinates: 33°06′35″N 83°28′55″W

Blountsville is an extinct town in Jones County, in the U.S. state of Georgia. The GNIS classifies it as a populated place.

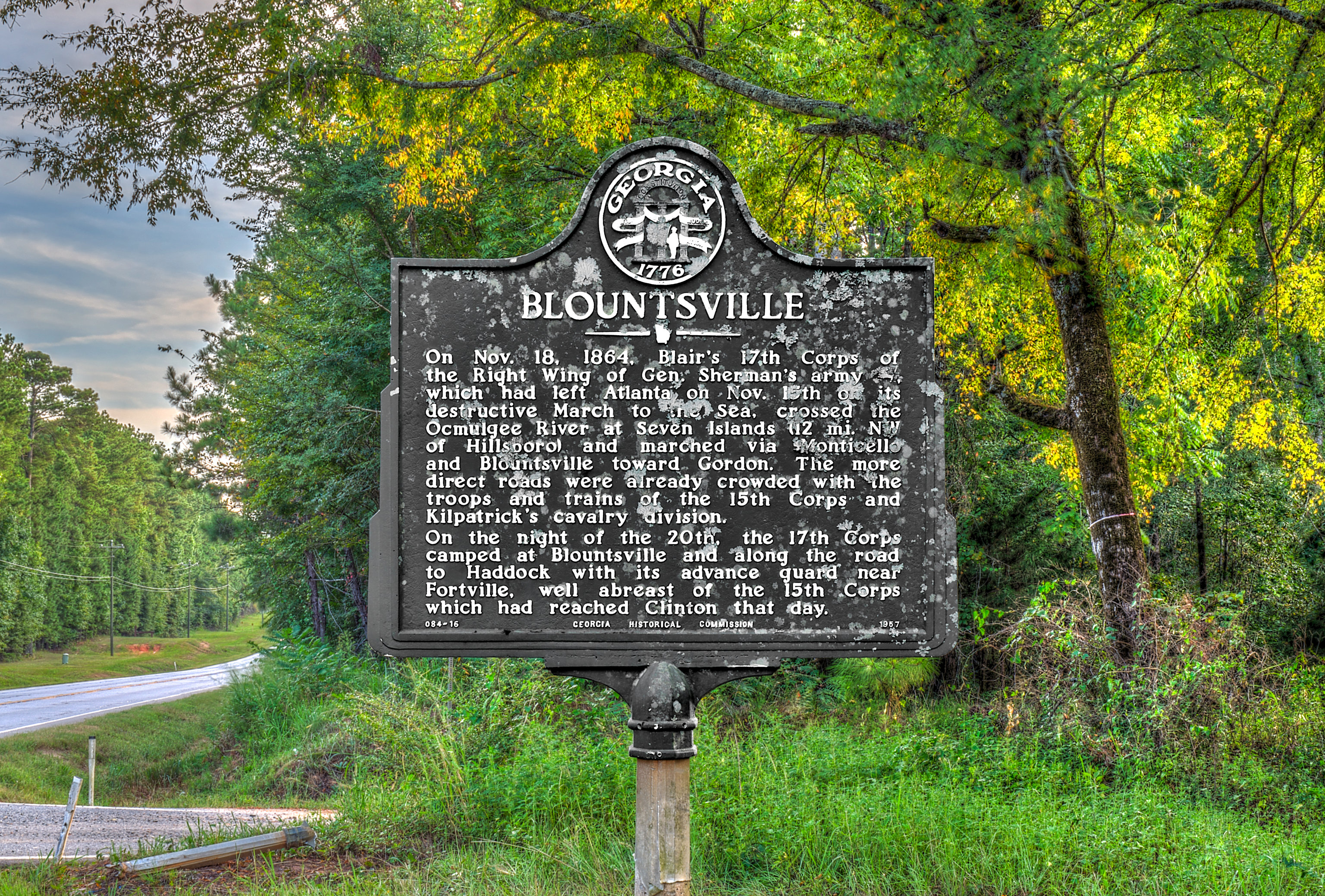
Blountsville historical marker

== History ==
The first permanent settlement at Blountsville was made before 1817. The community was named after the local Blount family. A variant name was "Blountville". A post office called Blountsville was established in 1819, and remained in operation until 1899. After Blountsville was badly damaged in the Civil War, its population dwindled.
