= Cabaniss-Hanberry House =

Historic house in Georgia, United States

- U.S. National Register of Historic Places
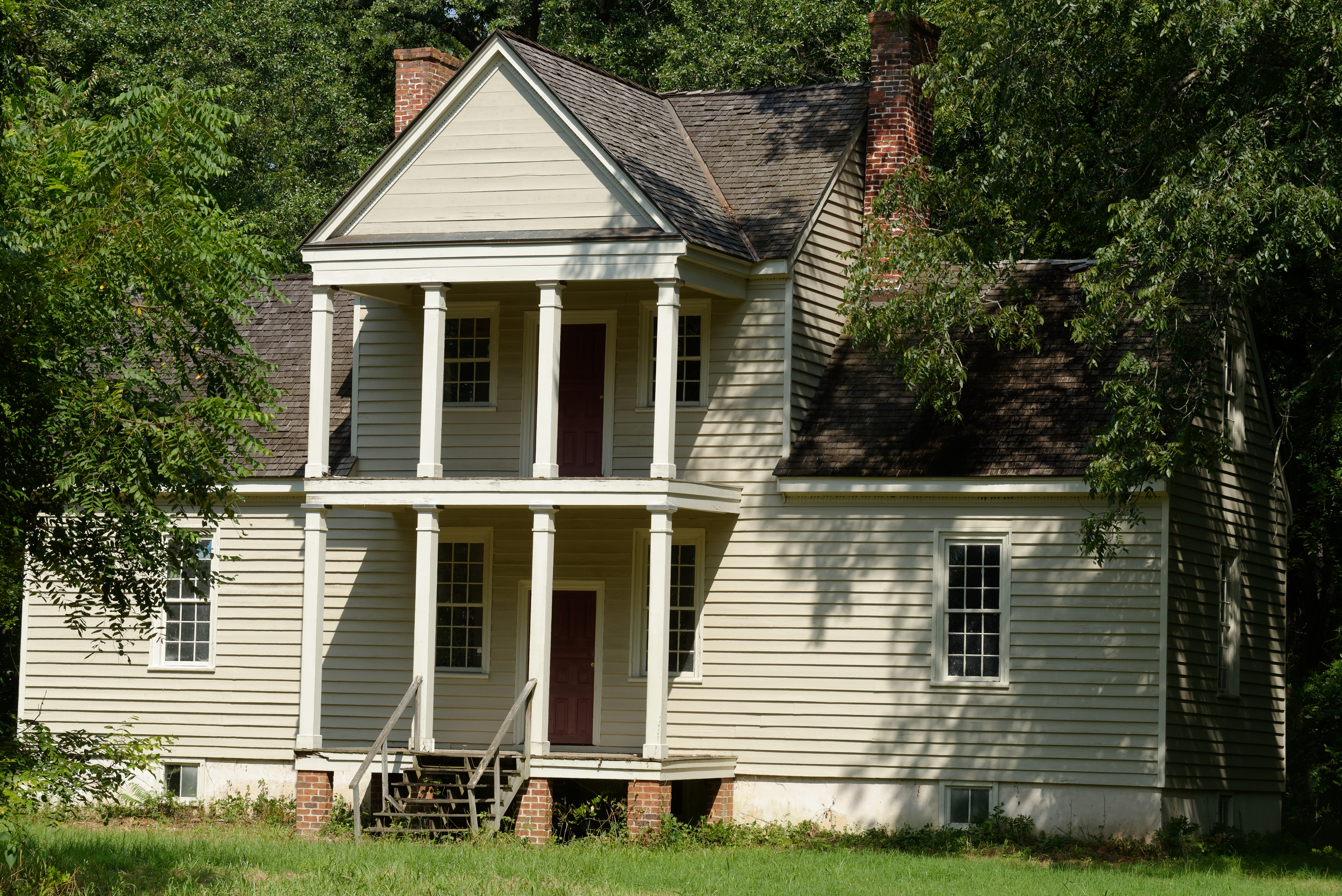
- The house in 2018

- Location within Georgia Location within the United States
- Location: NE of Bradley on Transquilla Rd.
- Nearest city: Bradley, Georgia
- Coordinates: 33°05′54″N 83°33′05″W
- Area: 10 acres (4.0 ha)
- Built: c.1805
- Built by: Cabaniss, George
- Architectural style: Jeffersonian Classicism
- NRHP reference No.: 76000639
- Added to NRHP: January 1, 1976

The Cabaniss-Hanberry House, about three miles northeast of Bradley, Georgia, was built by George Cabaniss c. 1805. It was listed on the National Register of Historic Places in 1976.

It was deemed notable as "an outstanding example of early rural Georgia architecture" and for its age. A related property is the Cabiness-Hunt House, already listed on the National Register, located about 2 miles west.

In 1975 the house had been unoccupied for several years, but Cabaniss descendants had plans for renovations.
