= Milan, Georgia =

- City
- Location in Dodge County and the state of Georgia
- Coordinates: 32°1′13″N 83°3′51″W
- Country: United States
- State: Georgia
- Counties: Telfair, Dodge

Area
  - Total: 3.15 sq mi (8.16 km^{2})
  - Land: 3.11 sq mi (8.06 km^{2})
  - Water: 0.039 sq mi (0.10 km^{2})
- Elevation: 312 ft (95 m)

Population (2020)
  - Total: 613
  - Density: 197.0/sq mi (76.05/km^{2})
- Time zone: UTC-5 (Eastern (EST))
  - Summer (DST): UTC-4 (EDT)
- ZIP code: 31060
- Area code: 229
- FIPS code: 13-51408
- GNIS feature ID: 0318146
- Website: https://milanga.org/

Milan (/ˈmaɪlən/ MY-lən) is a city in Dodge and Telfair counties in the U.S. state of Georgia. The population was 700 at the 2010 census, down from 1,012 in 2000. By 2020, its population was 613.

== History ==
Milan was founded in the 1880s when the railroad was extended to that point. The Georgia General Assembly incorporated Milan as a town in 1891. The city was named after Milan, in Italy.

On May 25, 1919, at the age of 72, a black man named Berry Washington defended two young black girls who were attacked by two drunken white men. A mob of 75 to 100 white men hung him from a post, then shot his corpse to pieces. In spite of a $1,000 reward offered by Governor Dorsey, no one was ever arrested.

== Geography ==
Milan is located in southeastern Dodge County and northwestern Telfair County at 32°1′13″N 83°3′51″W (32.020195, -83.064091). The county boundary passes through the center of the city. U.S. Route 280 passes through the city just south of the center, leading east 10 miles (16 km) to McRae and west 15 miles (24 km) to Abbeville.

According to the United States Census Bureau, the town has a total area of 3.2 square miles (8.2 km^{2}), of which 3.1 square miles (8.1 km^{2}) is land and 0.04 square miles (0.1 km^{2}), or 1.26%, is water.

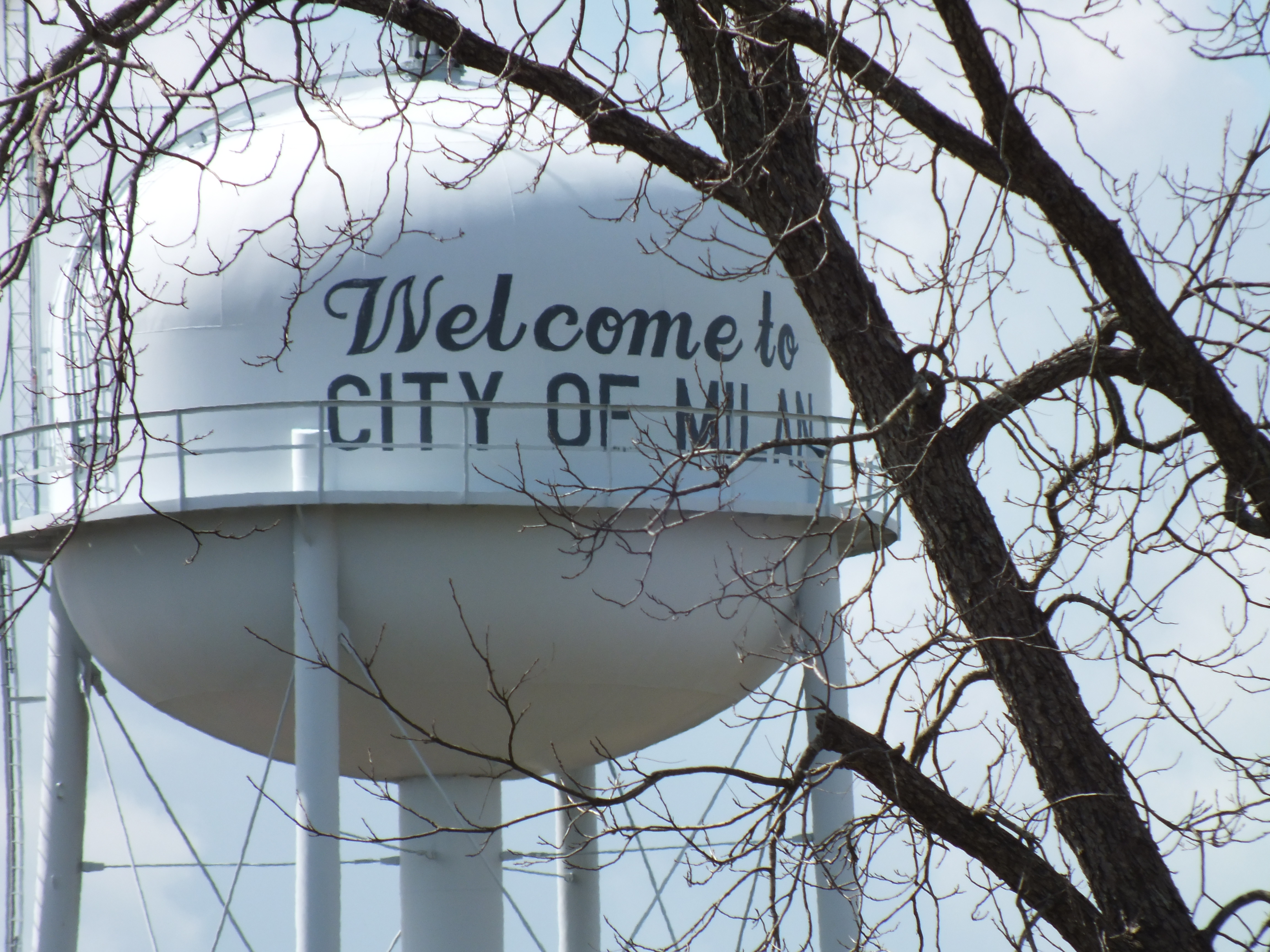
Milan, Georgia

== Demographics ==
Historical population
Census	Pop.	Note	%±
1910	287		—
1920	593		106.6%
1930	630		6.2%
1940	748		18.7%
1950	750		0.3%
1960	786		4.8%
1970	1,084		37.9%
1980	1,115		2.9%
1990	1,056		−5.3%
2000	1,012		−4.2%
2010	700		−30.8%
2020	613		−12.4%
U.S. Decennial Census

Milan racial composition as of 2020
Race	Num.	Perc.
White (non-Hispanic)	474	77.32%
Black or African American (non-Hispanic)	117	19.09%
Native American	1	0.16%
Asian	2	0.33%
Other/Mixed	15	2.45%
Hispanic or Latino	4	0.65%

As of the 2020 United States census, there were 613 people, 269 households, and 168 families residing in the city.
