= East Juliette, Georgia =

Unincorporated community in Georgia, U.S.

Coordinates: 33°06′31″N 83°47′33″W

East Juliette is an unincorporated community in Jones County, in the U.S. state of Georgia.

== History ==
East Juliette was an incorporated municipality from 1924 until 1995. The community was named from its location east of Juliette, Georgia. Variant names were "Glovers" and "Glovers Mill".
