= Cabanis =

Cabanis is a surname. Notable people with the surname include:

- Bernard Cabanis (born 1950), French ice hockey player
- George Cabanis (1815–1892), American politician
- James Cabanis (1838–1920), American politician, son of George Cabanis
- Jean Cabanis (1816–1906), German ornithologist
- José Cabanis (1922–2000), French writer, historian and magistrate
- Pierre Jean George Cabanis (1757–1808), French physiologist and philosopher

See also

- Cabaniss, surname
