= Roberts-Bush-Roberts House =

Historic house in Georgia, United States

- U.S. National Register of Historic Places
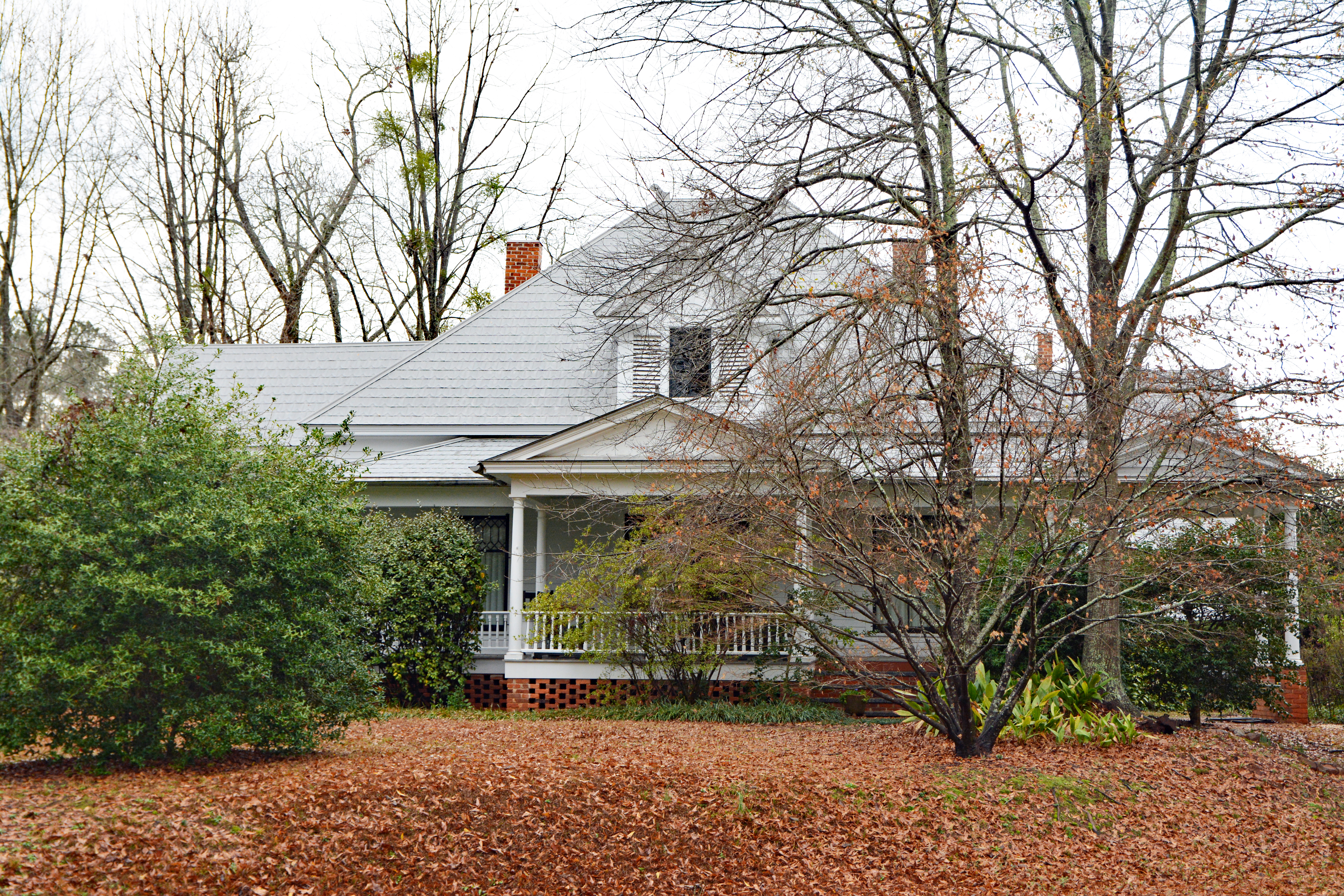

- Location within Georgia Location within the United States
- Location: 157 Eatonton Hwy., Gray, Georgia
- Coordinates: 33.0144°N 83.5327°W
- Area: 11 acres (4.5 ha)
- Built: c.1897, c.1904
- NRHP reference No.: 15000361
- Added to NRHP: June 30, 2015

The Roberts-Bush-Roberts House was listed on the National Register of Historic Places in 2015.

The main house is a c.1904 one-story Georgian Revival cottage, connected at the rear with a c.1897 two-story building, and there are several outbuildings.

The house has wood siding and has a brick foundation. It has a porch across the full length of its front facade, and a porte-cochere. Outbuildings include a brick well house (c.1904), a brick garage (c.1904), a smokehouse (pre-1904), an outhouse (c.1904), a barn (pre-1926), a truck shed (pre-1934), a tractor shelter/feed storage (pre-1934), and a potting shed (post-1934).

The c.1897 building was probably built by Annie Belle and John Roberts. In 1904 the property was bought by Thomas Sheppard Bush, who added the cottage, but later lost the property. It was bought in 1934 by Cecil Thomas Roberts (1903-1985), who with his wife Ethel operated a dairy farm on this and other properties.
