= Wayside, Georgia =

Community in Jones County, Georgia

Wayside, Georgia is an unincorporated community in Jones County, Georgia. It is included in zip code 31032.

It is a populated place at 33.0612451°N 83.6048950°W according to GNIS.

The name Wayside was selected for the community in the 1880s when the railroad was extended to that point. A post office called Wayside was established in 1887, and remained in operation until 1959.

It is the location of the Herman and Allene Shaver House, which is listed on the National Register of Historic Places.

Father and son Alonzo and James D. Green were innocent African-Americans lynched near Round Oak and Wayside, Jones County, Georgia in retaliation for the murder of popular white farmer Silas Hardin Turner on July 4, 1915. A third man, William Bostick was also lynched on this day. None of those killed received a trial.
