= Cabiness-Hunt House =

Historic house in Georgia, United States

- U.S. National Register of Historic Places
- U.S. Historic district
- Location within Georgia Location within the United States
- Location: SE of Round Oak off GA 11, in or near Round Oak, Georgia
- Coordinates: 33°05′16″N 83°31′48″W
- Area: 25 acres (10 ha)
- Built: 1810
- NRHP reference No.: 75000598
- Added to NRHP: May 2, 1975

The Cabiness-Hunt House near Round Oak, Georgia was built in c.1810. It was listed on the National Register of Historic Places in 1975.

It was built by George Cabiness, an American Revolutionary War soldier, or by his son Harrison, soon after they migrated to Georgia. The house was deemed "outstanding as an example representative of early rural Georgia architecture and especially significant when set in its historical context of being built c.1810, only a few years after the land had been ceded by the Indians." It is also significant architecturally for its merging of two structures, for its round-headed fireplace openings, and for the diamond-shaped pattern formed by glazed bricks on its chimney.

The property includes a second contributing building.
