= Bradley, Georgia =

- Unincorporated community
- Location within Georgia Location within the United States
- Coordinates: 33°03′14″N 83°33′31″W
- Country: United States
- State: Georgia
- County: Jones
- Elevation: 623 ft (190 m)
- Time zone: UTC-5 (Eastern (EST))
  - Summer (DST): UTC-4 (EDT)
- ZIP code: 31032
- Area code: 478
- GNIS feature ID: 331225

Bradley is an unincorporated community in Jones County, Georgia, United States. The community is located on Georgia State Route 11, 3.4 miles (5.5 km) north-northwest of Gray.

== History ==
Bradley had its start in 1886 when the Central of Georgia Railroad was extended to that point. An early variant name was "Franks". A post office called Franks was established in 1887, the name was changed to Bradley in 1889, and the post office closed in 1959. The present name is after John Wiley Bradley Jr., a railroad agent.
