= Cabaniss, Georgia =

Unincorporated community in Georgia, US

Coordinates: 33°09′12″N 83°52′46″W

Cabaniss is an unincorporated community in Monroe County, in the U.S. state of Georgia.

== History ==
A post office called Cabaniss was established in 1872, and remained in operation until 1904. The community was named in honor of E. G. Cabaniss, a local judge.
