= 1919 Jenkins County riot =

Race riot and lynchings, Georgia, USA

Coordinates: 32°54′08″N 82°1′25″W

Jenkins County riot of 1919
- Part of the Red Summer
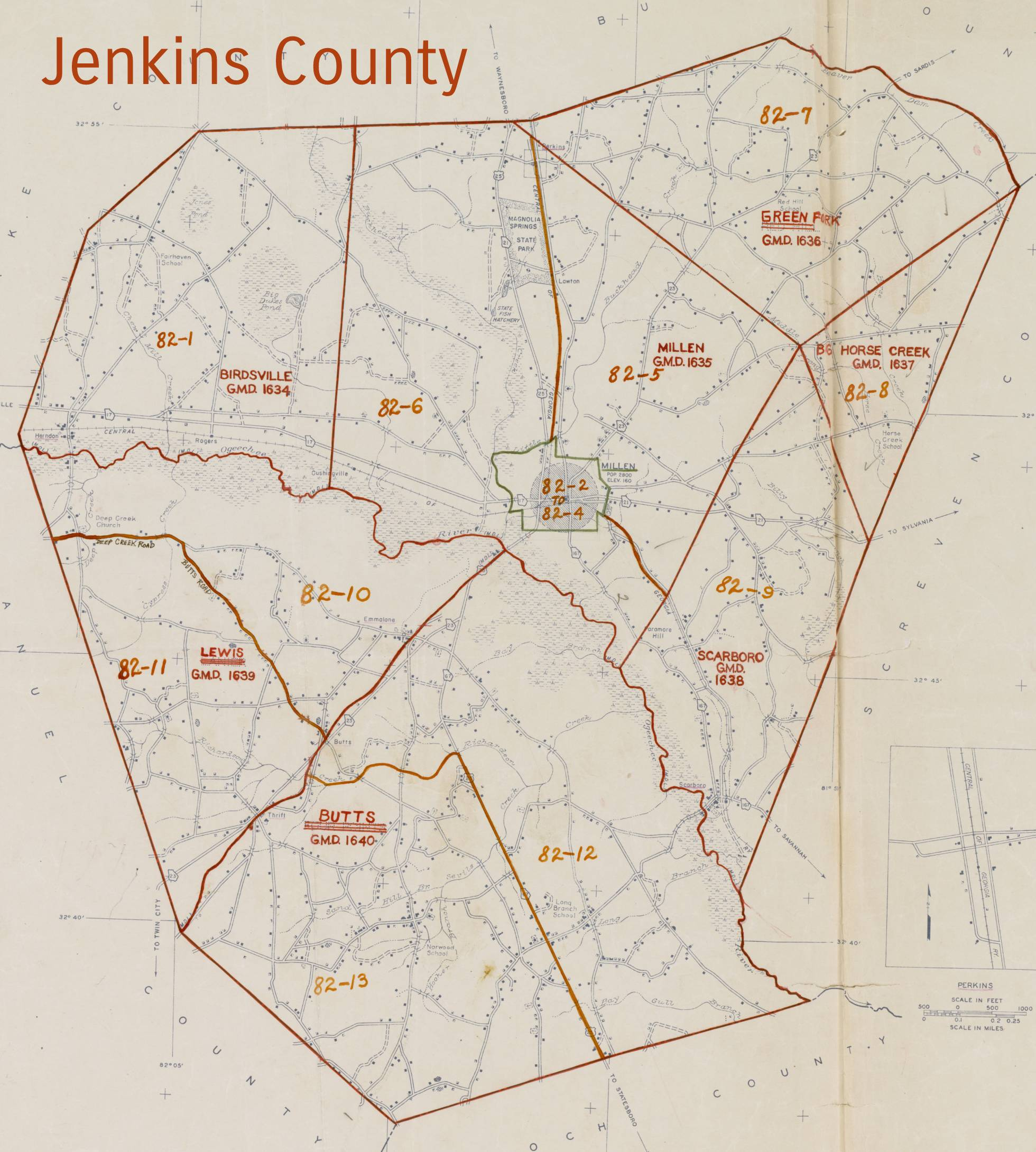
- Census Enumeration District Map Of Jenkins County
- Date: April 13, 1919
- Location: Carswell Grove Baptist Church and Cemetery, Jenkins County, Georgia
- Participants: White mobs attack the black community
- Deaths: Official death toll was 6: W. Clifford Brown, a white sheriff's deputy; Thomas Stevens, a white police marshal; Edmund Scott; Henry Ruffin; John Ruffin; Willie Williams; The New York Tribune reported that a seventh man was pulled from the Millen prison.

The Jenkins County riot of 1919 took place on Sunday, April 13, 1919, a black man killed two white police officers in an altercation during a traffic stop. In response, a white mob burned several buildings in the black community and killed four black men.

== Background ==
The event began at Carswell Grove Baptist Church, a black church, which was celebrating its anniversary. Preachers from several counties were coming, the Knights of Pythias were present in uniform, the choir was giving a special performance, and a cookout would follow. More than 3,000 were expected; it was one of the largest gatherings in east Georgia.

Joe Ruffin was a prosperous farmer and distinguished black Mason, "one of the wealthiest negros of Jenkins County." He was to have been the marshal of the event.

== The riot ==
Ruffin was driving to the church celebration when he had to stop because of the congestion of people. A car pulled alongside Ruffin, containing W. Clifford Brown, a Jenkins County sheriff's deputy, Thomas Stevens, a Millen, Georgia police marshal, whose presence outside his jurisdiction is unexplained, and Joe's friend Edmund Scott, in handcuffs. They were there in search of alcohol; Georgia had been a dry state since 1907. Not having found any, they arrested Scott for having a pistol.

Ruffin pulled out a checkbook to cover Scott's $400 bail, but Brown, "who the white papers said had a bad temper," said that cash was needed. That much cash was not available on a Sunday, and Brown said that he was taking Scott in. Ruffin reached into the car to pull Scott out, but Brown took out his gun. He struck Ruffin in the face with his pistol, and the gun went off and struck Ruffin on the head, knocking him unconscious but not seriously injuring him. Joe's son Louis, just discharged from the United States Army, thought that his father had been killed. Louis Ruffin consequently shot and killed Brown in retaliation. Louis then shot Stevens, wounding him, and subsequently beat him to death. Scott, in the middle of the gunfire, was killed accidentally.

"Hundreds of white men" came to Carswell Grove under the false impression that Joe Ruffin had been the one to fire the lethal shots, despite having been rendered unconscious by a nonlethal blow to the head. "Many of these remained out all night." They burned the church and Ruffin's car and lynched two of Ruffin's sons, either burning them to death or throwing their bodies into the fire after they had been killed. The three black Masonic lodges in Millen were burned. White mobs roamed the county for days. The New-York Tribune reported that seven black churches had been burned down. The Tribune also reported that a seventh man was pulled from the Millen prison and lynched.

The six fatalities included two white lawmen and four black men: Scott, two sons of Ruffin, Henry and John, and Joe's friend Willie Williams, who had been at the scene and was also lynched. Joe's son Louis fled and despite a bounty having been issued, was never apprehended.

== Joe Ruffin's fate ==
Ruffin was sure he would be lynched, and news accounts confirm that he would have been. (Georgia led the nation in lynchings in 1918.) He hid, then surrendered to Sheriff M. G. Johnston, who had arrived. Johnston drove him to the nearest large city, Augusta, for safety; he was placed in the jail.

A mob headed to Augusta to lynch Ruffin. He was moved for safety to jail in Aiken, South Carolina, where he remained for two weeks, registered under a false name. A mob of some 30 Georgians came to Aiken but accepted the jailer's statement that Ruffin was not there. He was indicted for the murders of the two officers; charges were not filed against any whites.

Ruffin hired "the best white lawyer he could find." He was granted a change of venue to Savannah. He was first tried for killing Stevens, convicted, and sentenced to be hanged. A motion for a new trial was successful, and he was acquitted. He was then tried for the killing of Brown and was again acquitted. "So strong was the sentiment in Jenkins county that an indictment was found charging him with the murder of his friend Scott." He was tried for the killing of Scott, was found guilty of manslaughter and sentenced to 15 years prison. The Georgia Supreme Court set that aside and ordered a new trial, which was never held. Because of public sentiment he could not be totally exonerated, so he was charged, convicted, and fined $500 for embezzlement, for although he never wrote a check, he had displayed the checkbook of a church of which he was treasurer. After friends paid the fine, by 1923 he was a free man. Impoverished after his legal expenses, he lived out his days in South Carolina, since he would not have been safe in Georgia.
