= Putnam County, Georgia, arson attack =

1919 racial hate crime in the United States

Putnam County, Georgia arson attack
- Part of the Red Summer
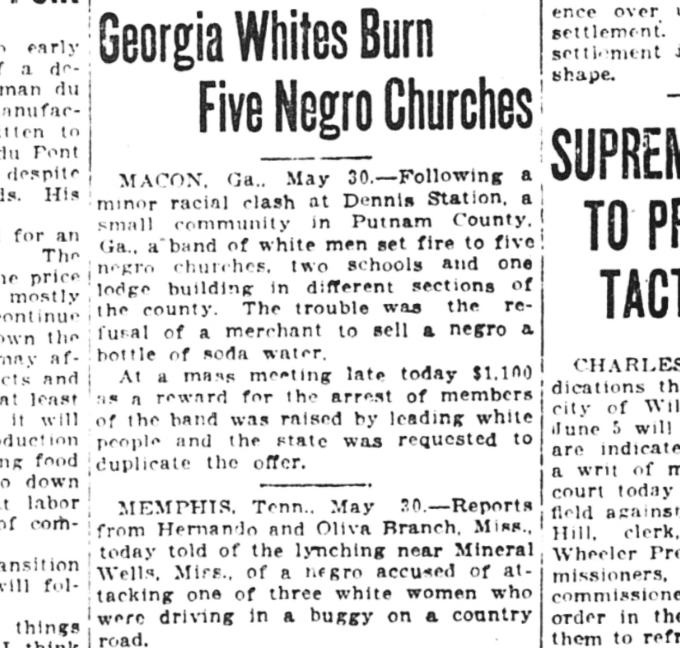
- US News coverage of the Putnam County, Georgia, arson attack
- Date: May 27, 1919
- Location: Putnam County, Georgia, United States

The Putnam County, Georgia arson attack was an attack on the black community by white mobs in May 1919.

== Racial violence ==
From the night of Tuesday, May 27, 1919, until Wednesday, May 28, 1919, morning arsonists burned down at least six black churches and multiple black community buildings in and around Eatonton. The Wheeling Intelligencer claimed the buildings were burnt down because of a "minor racial clash at Dennis Station" when a black man was refused a bottle of soda water. The community raised $1,100 ($20,400 in 2025) reward for any information about the people responsible for the fires.

A few miles away in Milledgeville, Georgia white and black mobs armed themselves and roamed the town when an argument broke when the white and black schools choose the same colors. Respected black preacher J.A. Martin noticed that in Milledgeville's black community "the males carried their guns with as much calmness as if they were going to shoot a rabbit in a hunt, or getting ready to shoot the Kaiser's soldiers." There was a lot of tension in the black community as white soldiers were lauded upon their return while Black soldiers, who also fought in WWI, were ignored.

== Aftermath ==
This uprising was one of several incidents of civil unrest that began in the so-called American Red Summer, of 1919. Terrorist attacks on black communities and white oppression in over three dozen cities and counties. In most cases, white mobs attacked African American neighborhoods. In some cases, black community groups resisted the attacks, especially in Chicago and Washington DC. Most deaths occurred in rural areas during events like the Elaine massacre in Arkansas, where an estimated 100 to 240 black people and 5 white people were killed. Also in 1919 were the Chicago Race Riot and Washington D.C. race riot which killed 38 and 39 people respectively, and with both having many more non-fatal injuries and extensive property damage reaching up into the millions of dollars.

== See also ==
- Washington race riot of 1919
- Mass racial violence in the United States
- List of incidents of civil unrest in the United States

== Bibliography ==
- McWhirter, Cameron (2011). Red Summer: The Summer of 1919 and the Awakening of Black America. Henry Holt and Company. ISBN 9781429972932. - Total pages: 368
- Maclean's (September 1, 1919). "The Ku Klux Are Riding Again". Maclean Magazine. Toronto, Ontario. ISSN 0024-9262.
- The New York Times (October 5, 1919). "For Action on Race Riot Peril". The New York Times. New York, NY. ISSN 1553-8095. OCLC 1645522.
- The Wheeling Intelligencer (May 31, 1919). "Georgia White Burn Five Negro Churches". The Wheeling Intelligencer. Wheeling, West Virginia: Intelligencer Pub. Co. pp. 1–24. OCLC 13502337.
