= Dublin, Georgia riot =

Race riots in Dublin, Georgia, USA (1919)

Dublin, Georgia riot of 1919
- Part of Red Summer
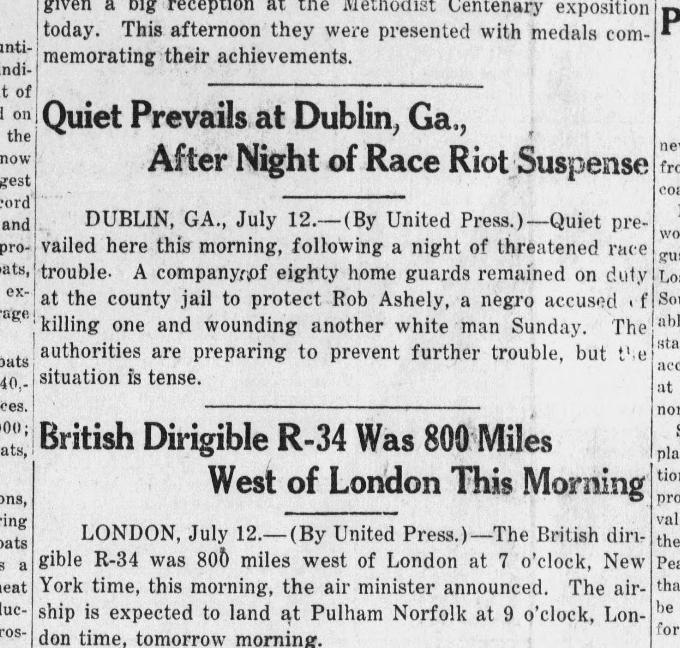
- US News coverage of the Dublin, Georgia riot of 1919
- Date: July 1919
- Location: Dublin, Georgia, United States

The Dublin, Georgia riot of 1919 were a series of altercations between white and black residents of Dublin, Georgia.

== Racial violence ==
A local African-American, Rob Ashely, was accused in the murder of a white man and wounding another man on July 6, 1919. While in jail the local white community threatened to storm the jail and lynch Ashely. They were thwarted by an armed black community group that was formed to protect the jail and prevent a lynching. Later a company of eighty home guards prevented further trouble, but for weeks the situation was tense.

== Aftermath ==
This uprising was one of several incidents of civil unrest that began in the so-called American Red Summer, of 1919. The Summer consisted of terrorist attacks on black communities, and white oppression in over three dozen cities and counties. In most cases, white mobs attacked African American neighborhoods. In some cases, black community groups resisted the attacks, especially in Chicago and Washington, D.C. Most deaths occurred in rural areas during events like the Elaine massacre in Arkansas, where an estimated 100 to 240 black people and 5 white people were killed. Also occurring in 1919 were the Chicago Race Riot and Washington D.C. race riot which killed 38 and 39 people respectively, and with both having many more non-fatal injuries and extensive property damage reaching up into the millions of dollars.

== See also ==
- Washington race riot of 1919
- Mass racial violence in the United States
- List of incidents of civil unrest in the United States

== Bibliography ==
Notes

References

- The Greeneville Daily Sun (July 12, 1919). "Quiet Prevails at Dublin, Ga., After Night of Race Riot Suspense". The Greeneville Daily Sun. Greeneville, Tennessee: W.R. Lyon. pp. 1–4. ISSN 2475-0174. OCLC 37307396.
- The New York Times (October 5, 1919). "For Action on Race Riot Peril". The New York Times. New York, NY. ISSN 1553-8095. OCLC 1645522.
- Rucker, Walter C.; Upton, James N. (2007). Encyclopedia of American Race Riots, Volume 2. Greenwood Publishing Group. ISBN 9780313333026. - Total pages: 930
- Voogd, Jan (2008). Race Riots and Resistance: The Red Summer of 1919. Peter Lang. ISBN 9781433100673. - Total pages: 234
