= Round Oak, Georgia =

- Unincorporated community
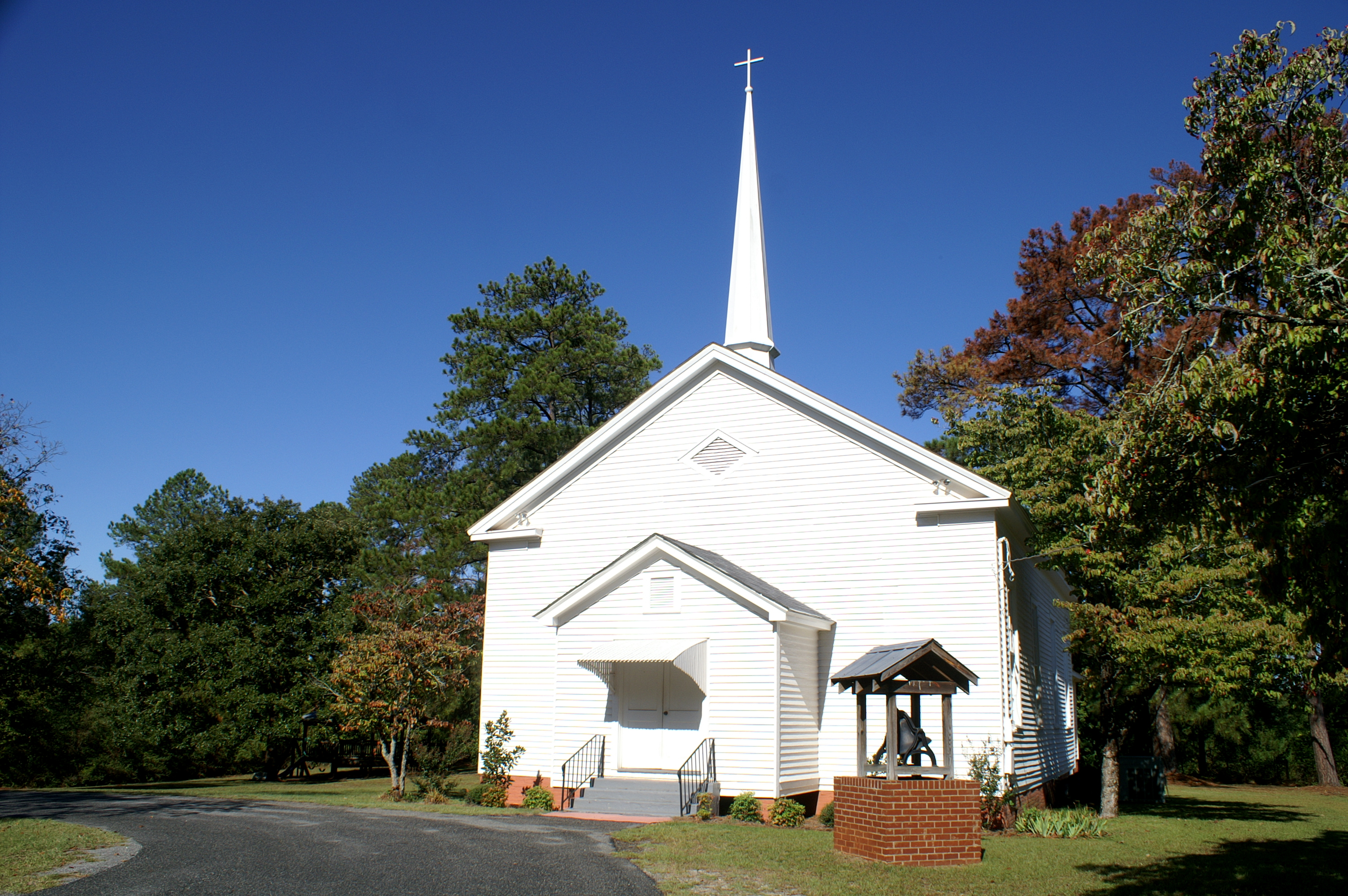
- Sunshine Baptist Church

- Location within Georgia Location within the United States
- Coordinates: 33°06′39″N 83°36′55″W
- Country: United States
- State: Georgia
- County: Jones
- Elevation: 627 ft (191 m)
- Time zone: UTC-5 (Eastern (EST))
  - Summer (DST): UTC-4 (EDT)
- ZIP code: 31038
- Area code: 478
- GNIS feature ID: 356505

Round Oak is an unincorporated community in Jones County, Georgia, United States. The community is located on Georgia State Route 11, 8.4 miles (13.5 km) north-northwest of Gray.

== History ==
Founded as Sylvania in 1807, Round Oak is one of the oldest settlements in Jones County. The name was changed to honor an ancient oak known as a gathering place for Native Americans. A depot was built in 1885 and brought a thriving economy which persisted until the early 1920s. The Big O Ranch, home of Otis Redding‘s widow Zelma, is located on Otis Redding Road just outside town, though it is not open to the public.

=== White Plantation ===
Thomas White Jr. (1781-1830), son of Thomas White and Sarah Shelton, of Orange County, Virginia, came a few miles north of Round Oak, before 1810. His grandfather was John White, the emigrant from Leicestershire, England, whose death was recorded by his will, executed in 1788 in Virginia.

Born in Virginia's central Piedmont, Thomas Jr. went with his father, in 1792, to settle near Ruckersville, Georgia at Farm Hill, the plantation and future birthplace of Thomas Sr.'s great-great-great-granddaughter, Corra Mae White. Thomas Jr. married Elizabeth Haynes Clark, of Virginia, in 1807, then came to Jones County with his new bride; they were among the earliest settlers and built their home near the Jasper County line. "White's district" is named for him. He enlisted with the Georgia State Militia in the War of 1812 and was a representative in the state legislature in 1817 and 1818. Known as "Colonel," he died at age 48, buried on what was then a large cotton plantation. (The White Family Cemetery is 12.3 miles north on Highway 11 from the railroad intersection in Gray, on the left, 50 yards in.) The plantation home no longer stands.

Only two sons of their 12 children survived—the first, Joseph Clark White (1808-1865), remained here and owned 3000 acres and 120 enslaved people; the second, Francis Marion White (1810-1887), went to Como, Panola county, in northwestern Mississippi, and owned more than 200 enslaved people.

One of the White's enslaved women in Jones County was "Aunt Ca'line White, who was buried in the cemetery at White Chapel AME, north of Round Oak, on January 18, 1948, and "known to every one in the village of Round Oak, and was 112 years old, the best that she, the older people, and her children could calculate." This would date her birth to the year 1836.

According to the Round Oak, Georgia newspaper, January 1948: "She was a slave girl on the plantation of Mr. and Mrs. Joseph Clark White at the "old White place," north of Round Oak before the War Between the States. Her husband, Tillman White, died several years ago. She leaves children, Jackson, 83; Mary, 81; Tom, 80; John, 78; Henry, 72; and also seventy grandchildren and great-grandchildren. Her oldest grandchild is 68.

The day before her death Aunt Ca'line threaded her needle, without the aid of glasses, and quilted; she also helped whitewash the fireplace. She always claimed to be part Indian and certainly had many of the characteristics of the Indian, and so do her children. Henry is known as "Red Man," and although he is 72, is as agile as most men of 58. Aunt Ca'line was thrifty, and always had a garden, chickens and many quilts pieced up.

She became rather deaf in the last few years and her grandchildren persuaded her to stay off the highway, but before that she came to town every day and was as chipper as could be, liked by all, white and colored.

Her version of the War was most interesting, and she was as much a "rebel" as any southerner could ever be. She always spoke of the "good old days" and says that they were well treated, had everything they needed, and they were all happy, before the Yankees came. Truly Aunt Ca'line will be missed and she leaves many friends behind besides a host of relatives."

=== Battle of Sunshine Church ===
The Civil War Battle of Sunshine Church took place near here and the church was burned by Sherman’s forces in 1864. It rebuilt at Round Oak in 1875.

Cavalry under Col. Iverson captured some 500 Federal soldiers under Major Gen. Stoneman in 1864. It was one of the sole victories of Confederate troops during Gen. Sherman’s Atlanta campaign. After the battle, Elizabeth Hayes Clark White was said to have nursed several wounded Yankees and Confederates back to health at a makeshift hospital set up in the White Plantation house. Mrs. White “tore up her linen sheets for bandages and cared for these men,” according to the History of Jones County, Georgia: For One Hundred Years, Specifically, 1807-1907, by Carolyn White Williams. “She told her descendants of the time when they left after cessation of hostilities, and they never heard from them again.” Gen. Stoneman was said to have been taken here after his defeat; an upstairs bedroom was said to be papered with the “useless Confederate money.”

A post office called Round Oak was established in 1878, and remained in operation until 1906.

The Georgia General Assembly incorporated Round Oak as a town in 1914. The town's municipal charter was repealed in 1995.

Father and son Alonzo and James D. Green were innocent African-Americans lynched near Round Oak and Wayside, Jones County, Georgia in retaliation for the murder of popular white farmer Silas Hardin Turner on July 4, 1915. A third man, William Bostick was also lynched on this day. None of those killed received a trial.
