= Jones County, Georgia =

County in Georgia, United States

- County
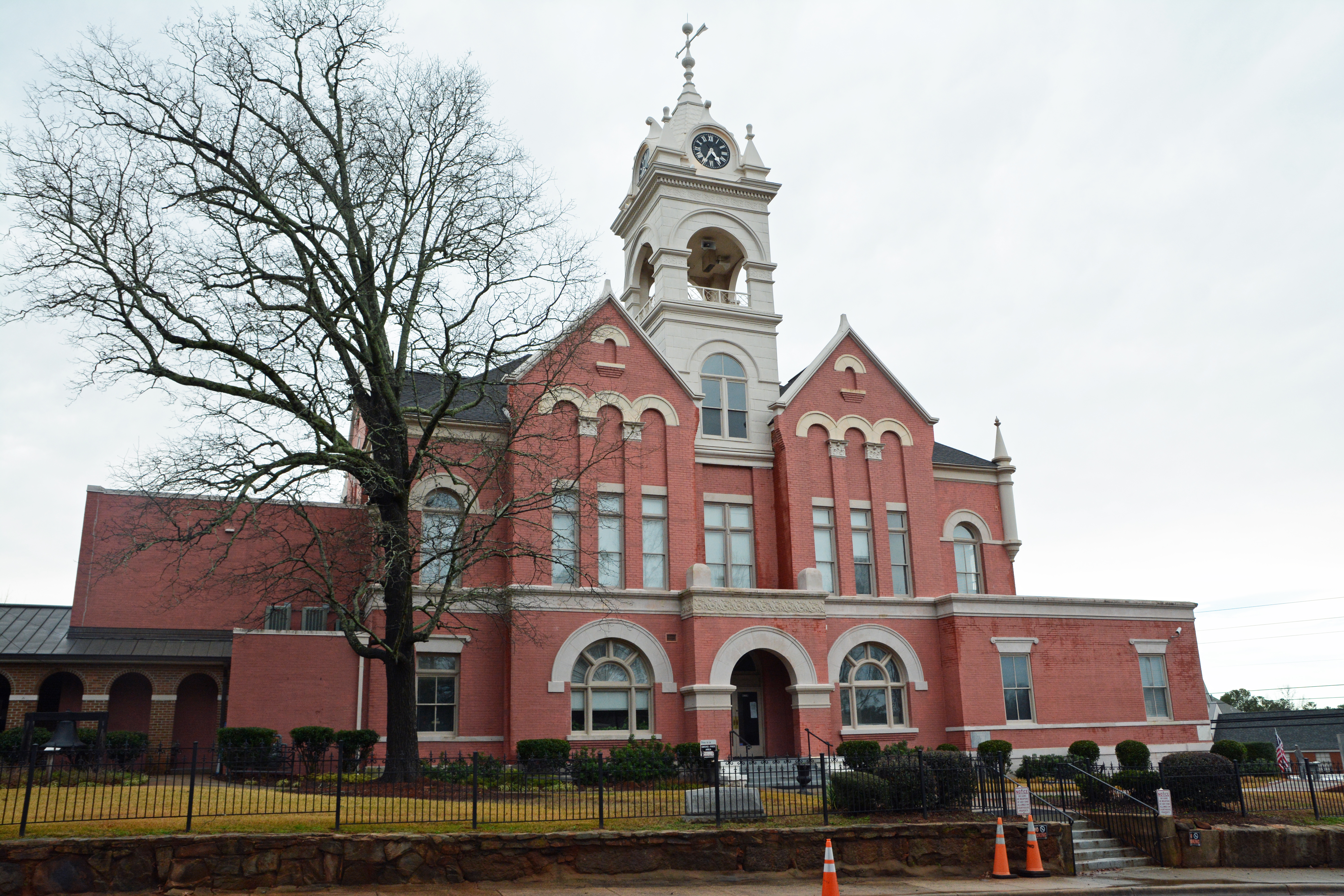
- Jones County Courthouse in Gray

- Location within the U.S. state of Georgia
- Coordinates: 33°02′N 83°34′W
- Country: United States
- State: Georgia
- Founded: December 10, 1807; 218 years ago
- Named for: James Jones
- Seat: Gray
- Largest city: Gray

Area
  - Total: 395 sq mi (1,020 km^{2})
  - Land: 394 sq mi (1,020 km^{2})
  - Water: 1.5 sq mi (3.9 km^{2}) 0.4%

Population (2020)
  - Total: 28,347
  - Estimate (2025): 29,171 ▲
  - Density: 72/sq mi (28/km^{2})
- Time zone: UTC−5 (Eastern)
  - Summer (DST): UTC−4 (EDT)
- Congressional district: 8th
- Website: www.jonescountyga.org

Jones County is a county in the central portion of the U.S. state of Georgia. As of the 2020 census, the population was 28,347. The county seat is Gray. The county was created on December 10, 1807, and named after U.S. Representative James Jones.

== History ==
Jones County, along with Morgan County, Putnam County, and Old Randolph, were established by an act of the Georgia General Assembly on December 10, 1807, from land that had originally been part Baldwin County in 1803 and, earlier, part of the Creek Nation. Jones County was originally bounded by a line running north 56° east to Commissioners Creek, then north 15° west to Cedar Creek, then up the creek to corner Randolph County and Putnam County, then along a line to Ocmulgee River, then down the river to where the old county line between Wilkinson County and Baldwin County was. It excluded parts of what is now Bibb County east of the Ocmulgee River, including the location of Fort Benjamin Hawkins, as they were part of a reserve guaranteed to the Creek Nation. Those areas were later added to Jones County after the Treaty of Indian Springs.

During the initial months of the county's existence, a town known as Albany served as the county seat. The town was renamed Clinton and was established as the county seat by the Georgia General Assembly on December 22, 1808. Clinton was incorporated as in 1816. During the 1800s Clinton grew as a center of commerce and the cotton trade. Clinton remained one of the most populous cities in Georgia in the mid-1800s.

Among the earliest settlers of the county were Thomas White (1781–1830) and Elizabeth Haynes Clark (1788–1856), of Orange County, Virginia, who established a plantation a few miles north of Round Oak, before 1810.

In December 1810 Jones County gained a portion of Putnam County between Cedar Creek and their original border. In December 1822 Bibb County was established and Jones County lost some of its land to that county.

During the early 19th century, Jones County had a rapid population increase. The peak came around 1835, when the county ranked third or fourth among all of the state's counties in agricultural wealth. After 1835, soil erosion and lack of funds to develop property drove many farmers to newly opened land elsewhere in Georgia.

Before the American Civil War, a few factories sprang up in the county, including a cotton gin factory at Griswoldville in the southern portion of the county and a woolen factory at Wallace. Griswoldville was founded by Samuel Griswold in the 1850s. During the Civil War, the cotton gin factory was reformatted so it could produce pistols and other weapons for the Confederate Army. Griswoldville was located on the railway linking Macon to Savannah, and became a prime target in 1864 as the Union Army moved through Georgia. On November 20, 1864, the town and the factories in it were burned as part of Sherman's March to the Sea. Days later the Battle of Griswoldville took place in the area. The town of Griswoldville was not rebuilt.

Many other areas in Jones County were damaged by the Union Army during that time period. The Jarrell Plantation State Historic Site in Jones County showcases one of the few and well-preserved antebellum plantations in Georgia.

In the 1890s a railroad line owned by the Central of Georgia Railway named the Macon & Northern Railroad was built through the county and bypassed Clinton by a mile after citizens wanted the line to not pass through the town. By the early 1900s the population had shifted northeastward and the city of Gray was established. On June 27, 1905, the citizens of Jones County voted on the issues of moving the county seat from Clinton to Gray. The results were 1,289 votes in favor of moving the county seat to Gray and 51 votes for keeping the county seat at Clinton. On August 9, 1905, Gray became the new county seat of Jones County.

Father and son Alonzo and James D. Green were innocent African-Americans lynched near Round Oak and Wayside, Jones County in retaliation for the murder of popular white farmer Silas Hardin Turner on July 4, 1915. A third man, William Bostick, was also lynched on this day. None of those killed received a trial.

== Geography ==
According to the U.S. Census Bureau, the county has a total area of 395 square miles (1,020 km^{2}), of which 394 square miles (1,020 km^{2}) is land and 1.5 square miles (3.9 km^{2}) (0.4%) is water.

The western half of Jones County, west of Gray, is located in the Upper Ocmulgee River sub-basin of the Altamaha River basin. The northeastern quarter of the county, north of Gray, is located in the Upper Oconee River sub-basin of the same Altamaha River basin, while the southeastern corner of Jones County is located in the Lower Oconee River sub-basin of the larger Altamaha River basin.

=== Major highways ===
- U.S. Route 129
- State Route 11
- State Route 18
- State Route 22
- State Route 44
- State Route 49
- State Route 57 / State Route 540 (Fall Line Freeway)

=== Rivers ===
- Ocmulgee River

=== Adjacent counties ===
- Jasper County - north
- Putnam County - northeast
- Baldwin County - east
- Twiggs County - southeast
- Wilkinson County - southeast
- Bibb County - south
- Monroe County - west

=== National protected areas ===
- Oconee National Forest (part)
- Piedmont National Wildlife Refuge (part)

== Communities ==
=== City ===
- Gray (county seat)

=== Unincorporated communities ===
- Bradley
- Clinton
- Fortville
- Haddock
- Round Oak
- Wayside

=== Extinct town ===
- Blountsville

== Demographics ==
Historical population
Census	Pop.	Note	%±
1810	8,597		—
1820	16,570		92.7%
1830	13,345		−19.5%
1840	10,065		−24.6%
1850	10,224		1.6%
1860	9,107		−10.9%
1870	9,436		3.6%
1880	11,613		23.1%
1890	12,709		9.4%
1900	13,358		5.1%
1910	13,103		−1.9%
1920	13,269		1.3%
1930	8,992		−32.2%
1940	8,331		−7.4%
1950	7,538		−9.5%
1960	8,468		12.3%
1970	12,218		44.3%
1980	16,579		35.7%
1990	20,739		25.1%
2000	23,639		14.0%
2010	28,669		21.3%
2020	28,347		−1.1%
2025 (est.)	29,171	▲	2.9%
U.S. Decennial Census; 1790-1880 1890-1910; 1920-1930 1930-1940; 1940-1950 1960-1980; 1980-2000 2010

=== Racial and ethnic composition ===
Jones County, Georgia – Racial and ethnic composition Note: the US Census treats Hispanic/Latino as an ethnic category. This table excludes Latinos from the racial categories and assigns them to a separate category. Hispanics/Latinos may be of any race.
Race / Ethnicity (NH = Non-Hispanic)	Pop 1980	Pop 1990	Pop 2000	Pop 2010	Pop 2020	% 1980	% 1990	% 2000	% 2010	% 2020
White alone (NH)	11,441	15,271	17,649	20,830	20,074	69.01%	73.63%	74.66%	72.66%	70.82%
Black or African American alone (NH)	4,993	5,308	5,490	6,977	6,739	30.12%	25.59%	23.22%	24.34%	23.77%
Native American or Alaska Native alone (NH)	28	31	39	61	46	0.17%	0.15%	0.16%	0.21%	0.16%
Asian alone (NH)	17	47	125	186	138	0.10%	0.23%	0.53%	0.65%	0.49%
Native Hawaiian or Pacific Islander alone (NH)	x	x	4	2	7	x	x	0.02%	0.01%	0.02%
Other race alone (NH)	0	3	14	25	73	0.00%	0.01%	0.06%	0.09%	0.26%
Mixed race or Multiracial (NH)	x	x	149	273	794	x	x	0.63%	0.95%	2.80%
Hispanic or Latino (any race)	100	79	169	315	476	0.60%	0.38%	0.71%	1.10%	1.68%
Total	16,579	20,739	23,639	28,669	28,347	100.00%	100.00%	100.00%	100.00%	100.00%

=== 2020 census ===
As of the 2020 census, the county had 28,347 people, 10,623 households, and 7,670 families residing in the county. The median age was 41.1 years, 23.9% of residents were under the age of 18, and 18.1% of residents were 65 years of age or older. For every 100 females there were 93.1 males, and for every 100 females age 18 and over there were 89.5 males age 18 and over. 16.6% of residents lived in urban areas, while 83.4% lived in rural areas.

The racial makeup of the county was 71.3% White, 23.9% Black or African American, 0.2% American Indian and Alaska Native, 0.5% Asian, 0.0% Native Hawaiian and Pacific Islander, 0.7% from some other race, and 3.5% from two or more races. Hispanic or Latino residents of any race comprised 1.7% of the population.

There were 10,623 households in the county, of which 34.6% had children under the age of 18 living with them and 27.6% had a female householder with no spouse or partner present. About 22.9% of all households were made up of individuals and 11.7% had someone living alone who was 65 years of age or older.

There were 11,584 housing units, of which 8.3% were vacant. Among occupied housing units, 78.2% were owner-occupied and 21.8% were renter-occupied. The homeowner vacancy rate was 1.3% and the rental vacancy rate was 6.3%.

== Politics ==
As of the 2020s, Jones County is a strongly Republican voting county, voting 68.85% for Donald Trump in 2024. For elections to the United States House of Representatives, Jones County is part of Georgia's 8th congressional district, currently represented by Mike Collins. For elections to the Georgia State Senate, Jones County is part of District 25. For elections to the Georgia House of Representatives, Jones County is part of districts 144 and 149.

United States presidential election results for Jones County, Georgia
Year	Republican		Democratic		Third party(ies)	
Year	No.	%	No.	%	No.	%
1912	3	0.66%	426	93.42%	27	5.92%
1916	6	1.39%	398	92.34%	27	6.26%
1920	31	26.27%	87	73.73%	0	0.00%
1924	26	5.87%	414	93.45%	3	0.68%
1928	100	19.46%	414	80.54%	0	0.00%
1932	0	0.00%	553	99.46%	3	0.54%
1936	23	4.33%	508	95.67%	0	0.00%
1940	101	14.13%	613	85.73%	1	0.14%
1944	196	22.82%	661	76.95%	2	0.23%
1948	103	9.25%	588	52.78%	423	37.97%
1952	278	16.30%	1,427	83.70%	0	0.00%
1956	382	24.03%	1,208	75.97%	0	0.00%
1960	489	25.68%	1,415	74.32%	0	0.00%
1964	1,805	56.67%	1,380	43.33%	0	0.00%
1968	693	19.42%	1,105	30.97%	1,770	49.61%
1972	2,483	74.25%	861	25.75%	0	0.00%
1976	1,317	27.51%	3,471	72.49%	0	0.00%
1980	1,828	35.02%	3,239	62.05%	153	2.93%
1984	3,401	55.01%	2,781	44.99%	0	0.00%
1988	3,618	57.41%	2,662	42.24%	22	0.35%
1992	2,770	38.05%	3,338	45.86%	1,171	16.09%
1996	3,272	46.80%	3,195	45.70%	525	7.51%
2000	4,850	60.11%	3,102	38.45%	116	1.44%
2004	6,939	63.91%	3,855	35.50%	64	0.59%
2008	7,782	62.46%	4,572	36.69%	106	0.85%
2012	7,744	63.90%	4,274	35.27%	101	0.83%
2016	8,305	65.98%	3,961	31.47%	321	2.55%
2020	9,940	66.53%	4,882	32.68%	118	0.79%
2024	11,079	68.85%	4,959	30.82%	54	0.34%

United States Senate election results for Jones County, Georgia2
Year	Republican		Democratic		Third party(ies)	
Year	No.	%	No.	%	No.	%
2020	9,854	66.39%	4,687	31.58%	301	2.03%
2020	8,815	66.12%	4,517	33.88%	0	0.00%

United States Senate election results for Jones County, Georgia3
Year	Republican		Democratic		Third party(ies)	
Year	No.	%	No.	%	No.	%
2020	5,397	36.60%	3,496	23.71%	5,853	39.69%
2020	8,803	66.00%	4,534	34.00%	0	0.00%
2022	8,089	65.93%	3,990	32.52%	191	1.56%
2022	7,502	66.71%	3,744	33.29%	0	0.00%

Georgia Gubernatorial election results for Jones County
Year	Republican		Democratic		Third party(ies)	
Year	No.	%	No.	%	No.	%
2022	8,583	69.71%	3,657	29.70%	72	0.58%

== Notable people ==
- John T. Edge, writer, commentator, and former director of the Southern Foodways Alliance
- Terrance Gore, professional baseball player with the Kansas City Royals, Chicago Cubs, New York Yankees, Atlanta Braves and New York Mets
- William Lee, early Alabama politician; immigrated to Jones County from England
- Sadie Gray Mays (1900–1969), social worker and wife of college president Benjamin Mays; born in Gray
- Otis Redding, singer, lived on a ranch he owned in Jones County during the height of his music career. A marker in downtown Gray pays tribute to Redding.

== See also ==
- National Register of Historic Places listings in Jones County, Georgia
- List of counties in Georgia
