= National Register of Historic Places listings in Wheeler County, Georgia =

This is a list of properties and districts in Wheeler County, Georgia that are listed on the National Register of Historic Places (NRHP).

This National Park Service list is complete through NPS recent listings posted March 21, 2025.

== Current listings ==
	Name on the Register	Image	Date listed	Location	City or town	Description
1	Glenwood High School	Glenwood High School	August 21, 1997 (#97000923)	505 3rd Ave. 32°10′43″N 82°40′34″W	Glenwood	
2	Wheeler County Courthouse	Wheeler County Courthouse	September 18, 1980 (#80001263)	Pearl St. 32°08′53″N 82°46′56″W	Alamo	
3	Woodland	Woodland	June 21, 1984 (#84001301)	GA 19; 31°59′49″N 82°38′28″W	Lumber City	
