= Georgia State Route 132 =

State highway in Georgia, United States

State Route 132
- SR 132 highlighted in red

Route information
- Maintained by GDOT
- Length: 18.6 mi (29.9 km)

Major junctions
- South end: SR 117 near China Hill
- North end: US 319 / US 441 / SR 31 in McRae

Location
- Country: United States
- State: Georgia
- Counties: Telfair

Highway system
- Georgia State Highway System; Interstate; US; State; Special
← SR 131	→ SR 133

State Route 132 (SR 132) is a 18.6-mile-long (29.9 km) state highway that runs south-to-north through south-central portions of Telfair County in the central part of the U.S. state of Georgia.

== Route description ==
The route begins at an intersection with SR 117 near China Hill (about thirteen miles (21 km) northeast of Fitzgerald). It heads northeast to an intersection with SR 165 before it meets its northern terminus, an intersection with US 319/US 441/SR 31 in the southern part of McRae.

SR 132 is not part of the National Highway System.

== Major intersections ==
The entire route is in Telfair County.

Location	mi	km	Destinations	Notes
	0.0	0.0	SR 117 (Jacksonville Highway) – Jacksonville, Rhine	Southern terminus
	3.6	5.8	SR 165 – Chauncey	
McRae–Helena	18.6	29.9	US 319 / US 441 / SR 31	Northern terminus
1.000 mi = 1.609 km; 1.000 km = 0.621 mi
