= Georgia State Route 149 =

State highway in Georgia, United States

State Route 149
- Big Horse Creek Road
- SR 149; mainline in red, connector route in blue

Route information
- Maintained by GDOT
- Length: 23.7 mi (38.1 km)

Major junctions
- South end: SR 117 southwest of Lumber City
- US 23 / US 341 / SR 27 southeast of McRae
- South end: US 280 / SR 30 southwest of Alamo

Location
- Country: United States
- State: Georgia
- Counties: Telfair, Wheeler

Highway system
- Georgia State Highway System; Interstate; US; State; Special
← SR 148	→ SR 150

State Route 149 (SR 149) is a 23.7-mile-long (38.1 km) state highway that travels south-to-north through rural portions of Telfair and Wheeler counties in the central part of the U.S. state of Georgia.

== Route description ==
The route begins at an intersection with SR 117 southwest of Lumber City. It zigzags its way north to an intersection with SR 149 Connector, southeast of McRae. It heads northeast to an intersection with US 27/US 341/SR 27. SR 149 continues to the northeast until it meets its northern terminus, an intersection with US 280/SR 30 southwest of Alamo.

SR 149 is not part of the National Highway System, a system of roadways important to the nation's economy, defense, and mobility.

== Major intersections ==
County	Location	mi	km	Destinations	Notes
Telfair		0.0	0.0	SR 117 – Jacksonville, Lumber City	Southern terminus
Telfair		13.5	21.7	SR 149 Conn. – McRae	Southern terminus of SR 149 Connector
Telfair		16.7	26.9	US 23 / US 341 / SR 27 (Golden Isles Highway) – McRae, Lumber City	
Wheeler		23.7	38.1	US 280 / SR 30 – McRae, Alamo	Northern terminus
1.000 mi = 1.609 km; 1.000 km = 0.621 mi

== Related route ==
State Route 149 Connector (SR 149 Conn.) is a short state highway located entirely within northern Telfair County, Georgia. It begins at an intersection with the mainline SR 149 southeast of McRae and travels in a nearly straight northwest direction. The route ends at its northern terminus, where it intersects with US 319/US 441/SR 31 south of McRae.

The SR 149 Connector is not included in the National Highway System, which designates roadways vital for the nation's economy, defense, and mobility. Despite its limited reach and local importance, the connector serves as a link between significant regional routes, providing access to the broader highway network surrounding McRae

State Route 149 Connector
- Location: near McRae
- Length: 3.2 mi (5.1 km)

The entire route is in Telfair County.

Location	mi	km	Destinations	Notes
	0.0	0.0	SR 149 (Racetrack Road) – Scotland	Southern terminus
	3.2	5.1	US 319 / US 441 / SR 31	Northern terminus
1.000 mi = 1.609 km; 1.000 km = 0.621 mi
