= Glenwood High School (Georgia) =

- U.S. National Register of Historic Places
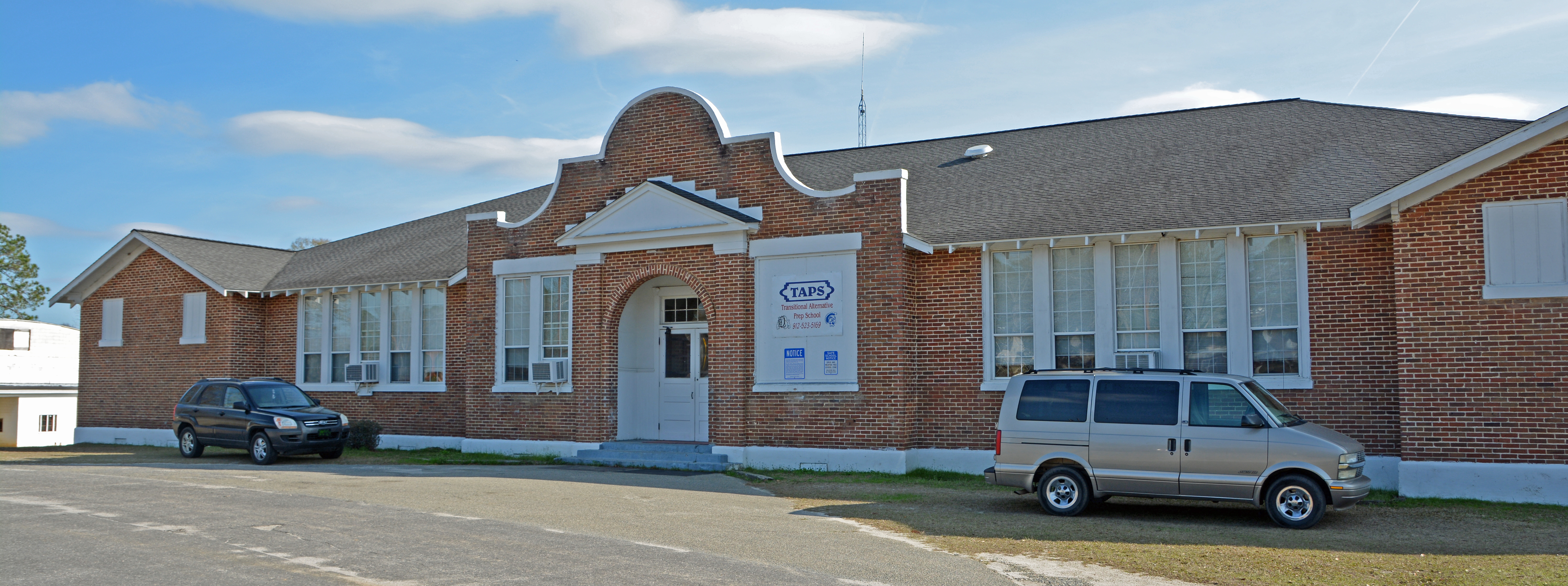

- Location within Georgia Location within the United States
- Location: 505 3rd Ave., Glenwood, Georgia
- Coordinates: 32.17864°N 82.67611°W
- Area: 12 acres (4.9 ha)
- Built: 1920, 1930, 1933, 1951
- Built by: Ragan and Company
- Architectural style: Colonial Revival, Mission/Spanish Revival, Bungalow/craftsman
- NRHP reference No.: 97000923
- Added to NRHP: August 21, 1997

Glenwood High School, also known as Old Glenwood School, is a historic school in Glenwood, Georgia that has been used in recent years as an alternative school. It is located at 505 3rd Avenue.

It was constructed as a one-story school building in 1920 and expanded with a two-story addition in 1930 and 1933, and an auditorium was added in 1951. It includes aspects of the Colonial Revival, Craftsman, bungalow, and Spanish Mission Revival architectural styles. In 1996 a Georgia Heritage Grant was awarded to repair the school's windows. It was added to the National Register of Historic Places in 1997. As of 2017, it houses the Transitional Alternative Prep School.

The front entrance has a Spanish Colonial Revival-style parapet.

== See also ==
- National Register of Historic Places listings in Wheeler County, Georgia
- Wheeler County School District
