= Georgia State Route 165 =

State highway in Georgia, United States

State Route 165
- SR 165 highlighted in red

Route information
- Maintained by GDOT
- Length: 37.5 mi (60.4 km)

Major junctions
- South end: SR 132 southeast of Rhine
- US 280 / SR 30 in Milan; US 280 / SR 30 / SR 117 in Rhine; US 23 / US 341 / SR 27 in Chauncey
- North end: SR 46 northeast of Eastman

Location
- Country: United States
- State: Georgia
- Counties: Telfair, Dodge, Laurens

Highway system
- Georgia State Highway System; Interstate; US; State; Special
← SR 164	→ SR 166

State Route 165 (SR 165) is a 37.5-mile-long (60.4 km) state highway that runs south-to-north, with a west-to-east middle section, through portions of Telfair, Dodge, and Laurens counties in the central part of the U.S. state of Georgia.

== Route description ==
SR 165 begins as Mount Zion Street at an intersection with SR 132 southeast of Rhine, in Telfair County. It heads to the northeast to the town of Milan, where it intersects U.S. Route 280 (US 280)/SR 30. The three highways head to the west-southwest concurrently and enter Dodge County. In Rhine, they meet SR 117, where SR 165 departs to the north, concurrent with SR 117. Shortly afterward, SR 165 departs to the northeast along the Chauncey-Rhine Highway and eventually enters Chauncey. There, they meet US 23/US 341/SR 27. The four have a brief wrong-way concurrency in the town, until the blinker-light intersection with Milan-Chauncey Road and Chauncey-Dublin Highway, the latter of which is where SR 165 departs to the northeast. It continues to the northeast and very briefly enters Laurens County. Then, it re-enters Dodge County and meets its northern terminus, an intersection with SR 46 northeast of Eastman.

SR 165 is not part of the National Highway System.

== Major intersections ==
County	Location	mi	km	Destinations	Notes
Telfair		0.0	0.0	SR 132 – McRae	Southern terminus
Telfair	Milan	7.8	12.6	US 280 east / SR 30 east (Milan–Rhine Highway) – McRae	Southern end of US 280/SR 30 concurrency
Dodge	Rhine	16.3	26.2	US 280 west / SR 30 (2nd Street) / SR 117 south (Central Street)	Northern end of US 280/SR 30 concurrency; southern end of SR 117 concurrency
Dodge	Rhine	16.9	27.2	SR 117 north (Central Street) – Eastman	Northern end of SR 117 concurrency
Dodge	Chauncey	27.5	44.3	US 23 north / US 341 north / SR 27 north (McRae Highway)	Southern end of US 23/US 341/SR 27 concurrency
Dodge	Chauncey	28.0	45.1	US 23 south / US 341 south / SR 27 south (McRae Highway)	Northern end of US 23/US 341/SR 27 concurrency
Laurens	No major junctions				
Dodge		37.5	60.4	SR 46 (Soperton Highway) – Eastman, Soperton	Northern terminus
1.000 mi = 1.609 km; 1.000 km = 0.621 mi: Concurrency terminus
