= Telfair County School District =

School district in Georgia (U.S. state)

Address
- 212 West Huckabee Street McRae, Georgia, 31055-3818; United States
- Coordinates: 32.065184°N 82.900488°W

District information
- Grades: Pre-school - 12
- Superintendent: Lenard F. Harrelson Jr.
- Accreditations: Southern Association of Colleges and Schools; Georgia Accrediting Commission

Students and staff
- Enrollment: 1,648
- Faculty: 112

Other information
- Telephone: (229) 868-5661
- Fax: (229) 868-5549
- Website: www.telfairschools.org

The Telfair County School District is a public school district in Telfair County, Georgia, United States, based in McRae. It serves the communities of Helena, Jacksonville, Lumber City, McRae, Milan, and Scotland. First established as McRae Public School, December 16, 1897, as recorded in the Acts of the General Assembly of The State of Georgia, published 1898.

== Schools ==
The Telfair County School District has one elementary school, one middle school, and one high school.

=== Elementary schools ===
- Telfair County Elementary School - built in 2004.

=== Middle school ===
Telfair County Middle School - The school consists of 6th, 7th, and 8th Grades. Athletically, TCMS is a member of the Oconee River Middle School Conference and fields competitive sports teams in fastpitch softball, football, cross country, basketball, baseball, golf, track, and tennis.

- Principal - Christopher D. Ellis
- Assistant Principal - Rodney Moore
- Assistant Principal - Shelby Meeks
- Counselor - Gladys Hall

=== High school ===
- Telfair County High School - The school mascot is the Trojan, and school sports include baseball, basketball, football, track, tennis, softball, and wrestling.
