= National Register of Historic Places listings in Telfair County, Georgia =

This is a list of properties and districts in Telfair County, Georgia that are listed on the National Register of Historic Places (NRHP).

This National Park Service list is complete through NPS recent listings posted March 21, 2025.

== Current listings ==
| | Name on the Register | Image | Date listed | Location | City or town | Description |
|---|---|---|---|---|---|---|
| 1 | Max and Emma Sue McRae House | Max and Emma Sue McRae House | March 1, 2007 (#07000087) | 405 S. Second Ave. 32°03′53″N 82°54′01″W | McRae | Built in 1897 |
| 2 | South Georgia College Administration Building | South Georgia College Administration Building | October 16, 1980 (#80001243) | College St. 32°04′05″N 82°54′37″W | McRae | Now houses the Telfair Center for the Arts |
| 3 | Telfair County Courthouse and Jail | Telfair County Courthouse and Jail | June 8, 1995 (#95000720) | Courthouse Sq. 32°04′02″N 82°53′48″W | McRae | Courthouse rebuilt in 1934 using the walls of the 1904 courthouse. Jail built in 1902. |
