= Workmore, Georgia =

- Unincorporated community
- Location within the state of Georgia Workmore, Georgia (the United States)
- Coordinates: 31°56′07″N 82°56′22″W
- Country: United States
- State: Georgia
- County: Telfair
- Elevation: 259 ft (79 m)
- Time zone: UTC-5 (Eastern (EST))
  - Summer (DST): UTC-4 (EDT)
- Area code: 229
- GNIS ID: 333468

Workmore is an unincorporated community in Telfair County, Georgia, United States.

Workmore is located at about the center of the county, between McRae-Helena (the county seat) and Jacksonville, and between Milan and Lumber City. Because Workmore is unincorporated, it is serviced totally by the county government. The town was named after a large working farm named Workmore, which was one of several farms owned by William Henry Reviere (1862-1936) of Rochelle in Wilcox County, Georgia. The Revieres donated the land for the Workmore High School which opened in 1922, and a reunion at the Workmore High School is held annually.
