= Wheeler County School District =

School district in Georgia (U.S. state)

Address
- 18 Lumber City Alamo Road Alamo, Georgia, 30411-4117; United States
- Coordinates: 32.070975°N 84.540868°W

District information
- Grades: Pre-school - 12
- Superintendent: Alex Alvarez
- Accreditations: Southern Association of Colleges and Schools; Georgia Accrediting Commission

Students and staff
- Enrollment: 1,150
- Faculty: 82

Other information
- Telephone: (912) 568-7198
- Fax: (912) 568-1985
- Website: www.wheelercountyschools.org

The Wheeler County School District is a public school district in Wheeler County, Georgia, United States, based in Alamo. It serves the communities of Alamo, Glenwood, Helena, and Scotland.

== Schools ==
The Wheeler County School District has one elementary school and one middle-high school.

=== Elementary schools ===
- Wheeler County Elementary School

=== Middle-high school ===
- Wheeler County High School
