= Helena, Georgia =

- City
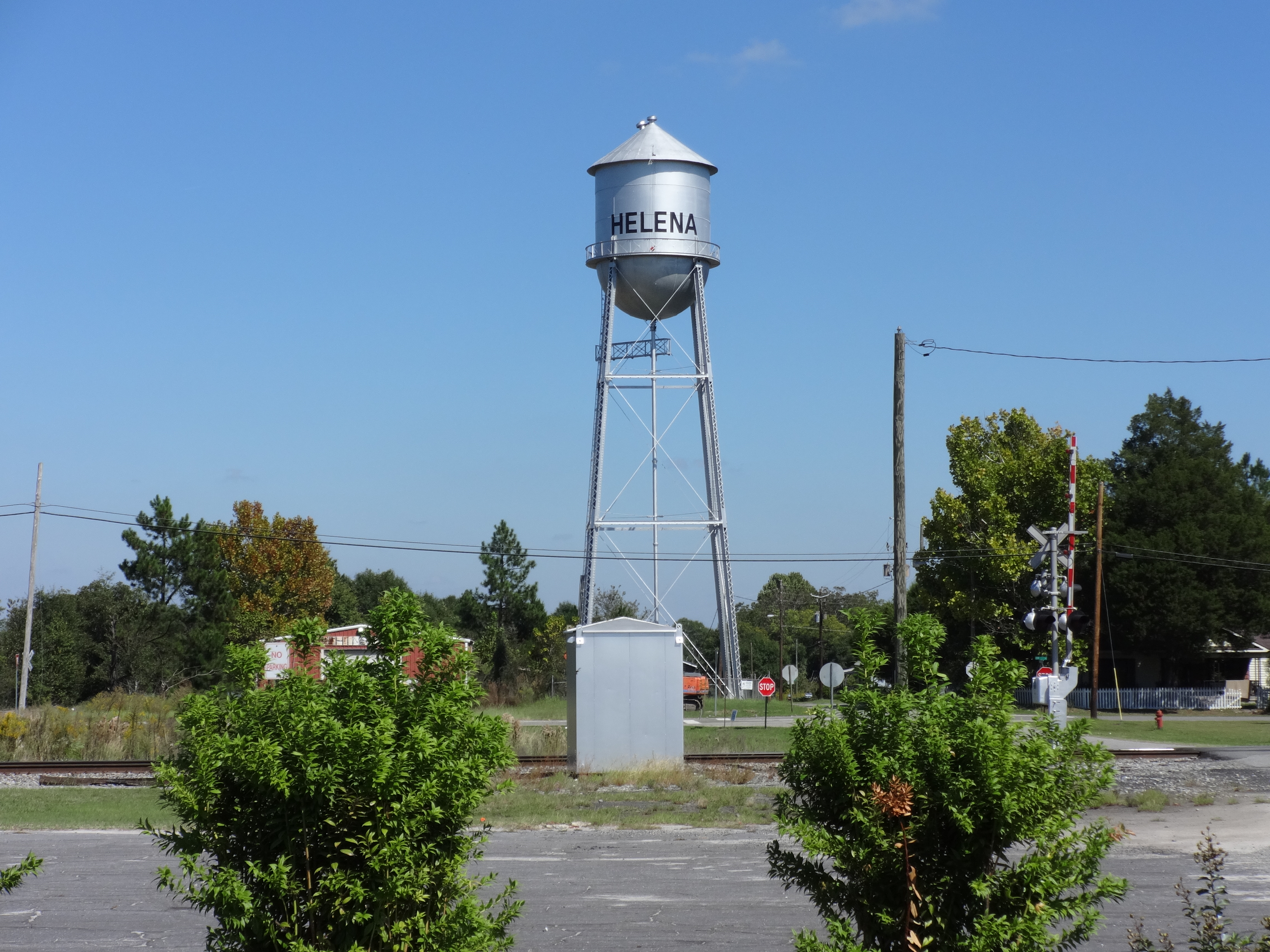
- Helena Water Tower

- Location in Telfair County and the state of Georgia
- Coordinates: 32°4′29″N 82°54′46″W
- Country: United States
- State: Georgia
- Counties: Telfair, Wheeler

Area
  - Total: 2.1 sq mi (5.5 km^{2})
  - Land: 2.1 sq mi (5.5 km^{2})
  - Water: 0 sq mi (0 km^{2})
- Elevation: 240 ft (73 m)

Population (2010)
  - Total: 2,883
  - Density: 1,087/sq mi (419.5/km^{2})
- Time zone: UTC-5 (Eastern (EST))
  - Summer (DST): UTC-4 (EDT)
- ZIP code: 31037
- Area code: 229
- FIPS code: 13-37816
- GNIS feature ID: 0315302

Helena was a city in Telfair and Wheeler counties in the U.S. state of Georgia. The population was 2,883 at the 2010 census, up from 2,307 in 2000 and 1,256 in 1990. The population increase accompanied establishment of the McRae Correctional Institution, which provided new jobs. The prison population is counted as well. On January 1, 2015, Helena and the adjacent city (and Telfair County seat) of McRae merged to form McRae-Helena.

== History ==
The Georgia General Assembly incorporated the place as the Town of Helena in 1890. It is unknown why the name "Helena" was applied to this community.

By 2013, Helena's wastewater capacity had become too large for the city to manage. Simply turning over water services to neighboring McRae would have left Helena with only two services. Eventually, the two cities agreed to merge. The necessary legislation was signed into law on April 10, 2014. At midnight on January 1, 2015, Helena and McRae merged as the city of McRae-Helena.

== Geography ==
Helena is located at 32°4′29″N 82°54′46″W (32.074601, -82.912698).

According to the United States Census Bureau, the city has a total area of 2.1 square miles (5.4 km^{2}), all land.

== Demographics ==
Historical population
Census	Pop.	Note	%±
1900	604		—
1910	890		47.4%
1920	928		4.3%
1930	963		3.8%
1940	1,073		11.4%
1950	1,027		−4.3%
1960	1,290		25.6%
1970	1,230		−4.7%
1980	1,390		13.0%
1990	1,256		−9.6%
2000	2,307		83.7%
2010	2,883		25.0%
2018 (est.)	2,893		0.3%
U.S. Decennial Census; 1850-1870 1870-1880; 1890-1910 1920-1930; 1940 1950 1960; 1970 1980 1990; 2000 2010

=== Racial and ethnic composition ===
Helena city, Georgia – Racial and ethnic composition Note: the US Census treats Hispanic/Latino as an ethnic category. This table excludes Latinos from the racial categories and assigns them to a separate category. Hispanics/Latinos may be of any race.
Race / Ethnicity (NH = Non-Hispanic)	Pop 2000	Pop 2010	% 2000	% 2010
White alone (NH)	957	1,087	41.48%	37.70%
Black or African American alone (NH)	1,249	1,554	54.14%	53.90%
Native American or Alaska Native alone (NH)	0	1	0.00%	0.03%
Asian alone (NH)	9	6	0.39%	0.21%
Native Hawaiian or Pacific Islander alone (NH)	0	0	0.00%	0.00%
Other race alone (NH)	0	0	0.00%	0.00%
Mixed race or Multiracial (NH)	13	24	0.56%	0.83%
Hispanic or Latino (any race)	79	211	3.42%	7.32%
Total	2,307	2,883	100.00%	100.00%

As of the census of 2000, there were 2,307 people, 520 households, and 322 families residing in the city. The population density was 1,092.3 inhabitants per square mile (421.7/km^{2}). There were 603 housing units at an average density of 285.5 per square mile (110.2/km^{2}). The racial makeup of the city was 42.35% White, 54.18% African American, 0.39% Asian, 2.43% from other races, and 0.65% from two or more races. Hispanic or Latino of any race were 3.42% of the population.

There were 520 households, out of which 30.6% had children under the age of 18 living with them, 37.1% were married couples living together, 20.2% had a female householder with no husband present, and 37.9% were non-families. 34.2% of all households were made up of individuals, and 15.4% had someone living alone who was 65 years of age or older. The average household size was 2.38 and the average family size was 3.04.

In the city, the population was spread out, with 14.2% under the age of 18, 15.3% from 18 to 24, 44.5% from 25 to 44, 18.7% from 45 to 64, and 7.3% who were 65 years of age or older. The median age was 33 years. For every 100 females, there were 235.3 males. For every 100 females age 18 and over, there were 281.5 males.

The median income for a household in the city was $22,212, and the median income for a family was $25,543. Males had a median income of $26,772 versus $18,208 for females. The per capita income for the city was $9,520. About 25.3% of families and 29.8% of the population were below the poverty line, including 46.0% of those under age 18 and 18.8% of those age 65 or over.
