= Max and Emma Sue McRae House =

Historic house in Georgia, United States

- U.S. National Register of Historic Places
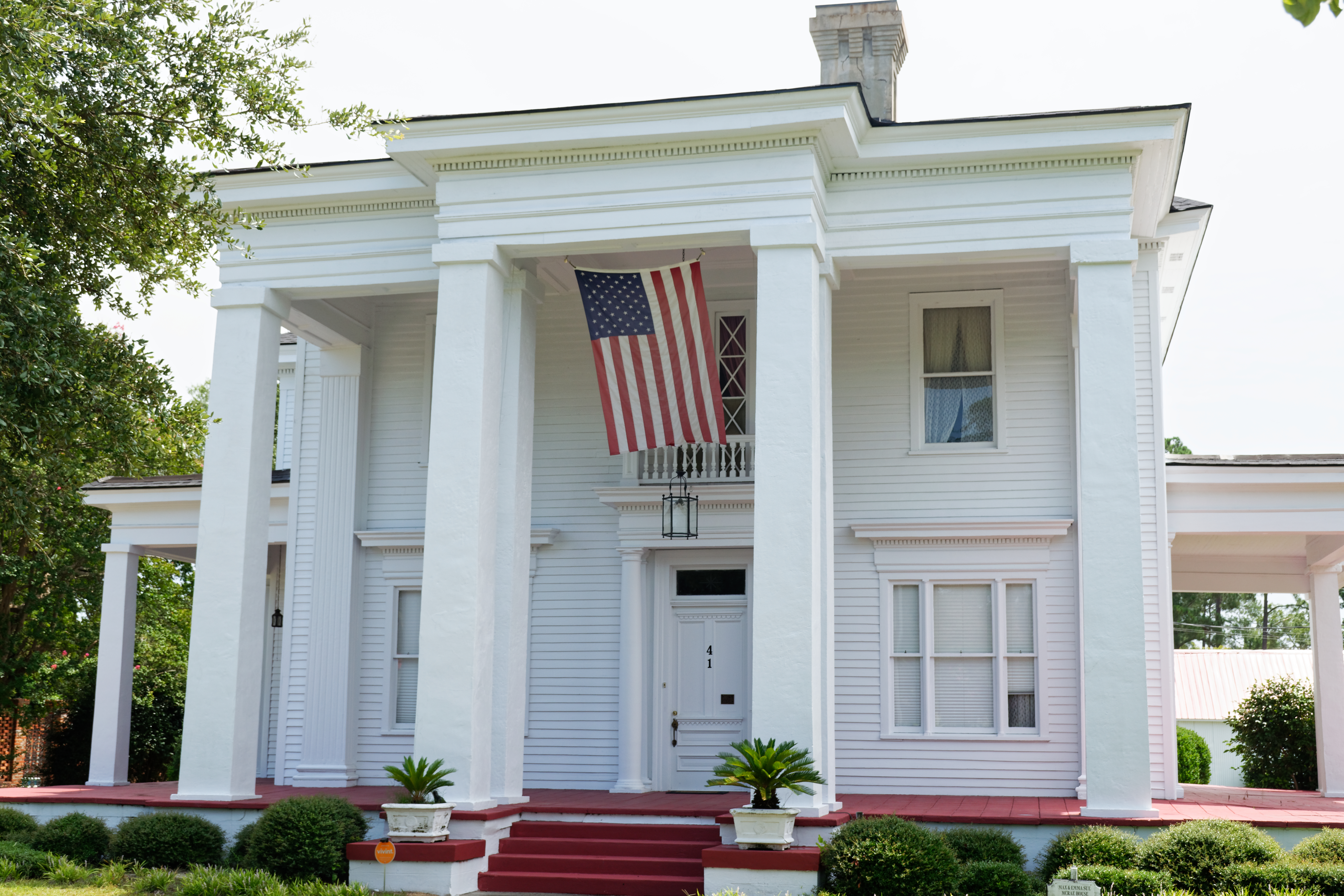

- Location within Georgia
- Location: 405 S. Second Ave., McRae, Georgia
- Coordinates: 32°03′53″N 82°54′01″W
- Area: 1 acre (0.40 ha)
- Built: 1897
- Architectural style: Classical Revival
- NRHP reference No.: 07000087
- Added to NRHP: March 1, 2007

The Max and Emma Sue McRae House in McRae, Georgia is a Classical Revival-style house built in 1897 which is listed on the National Register of Historic Places.

It was built in anticipation of the wedding of Max McRae (d.1951) (Note: The NRHP nomination states Max McRae was born in 1885, but that must be incorrect.) and Emma Sue Griffith (1875-1972). The couple married in 1898 and moved into the home.

It is located at 405 S. Second Ave. in McRae in Telfair County, Georgia. The listing included two other contributing buildings: an early 1900s gardening shed and a 1930s garage. It also included a non-contributing modern swimming pool.
