= Woodland (Lumber City, Georgia) =

Historic house in Georgia, United States

- U.S. National Register of Historic Places
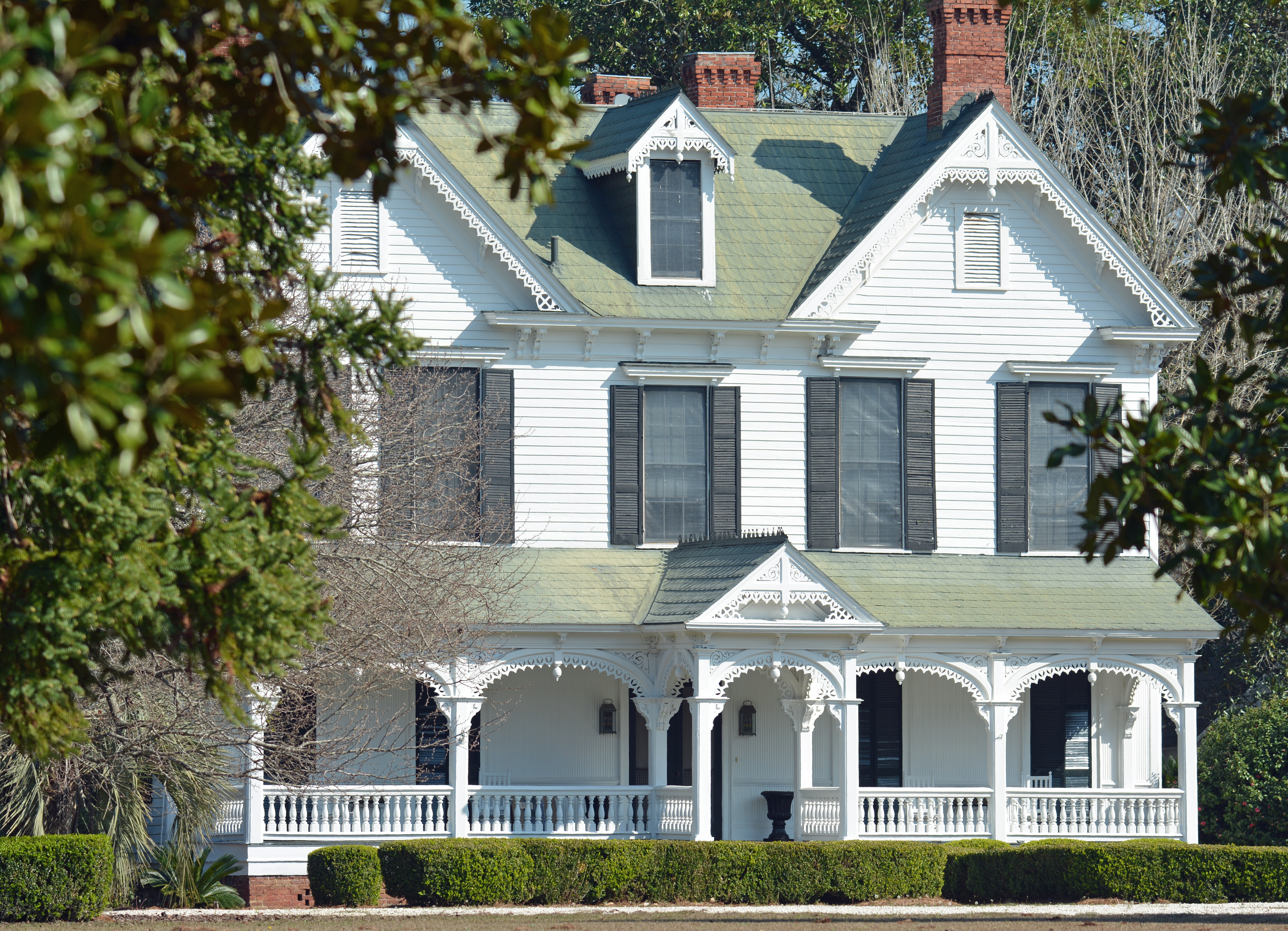

- Location within Georgia Location within the United States
- Location: GA 19 and Old Bell Ferry Road, Lumber City, Georgia
- Coordinates: 31.99705°N 82.6412°W
- Area: 4 acres (1.6 ha)
- Built: 1870
- Built by: Captain Renwick and Johnus Thormaholon
- Architectural style: Late Victorian, Victorian Eclectic
- NRHP reference No.: 84001301
- Added to NRHP: June 21, 1984

Woodland is a two-story Victorian Eclectic-style house on 4 acres (1.6 ha) of property in rural Wheeler County, Georgia. It was built in c.1877 and is listed on the National Register of Historic Places. Its NRHP nomination noted that it has "outstanding Gothic-style scroll-sawn detailing".

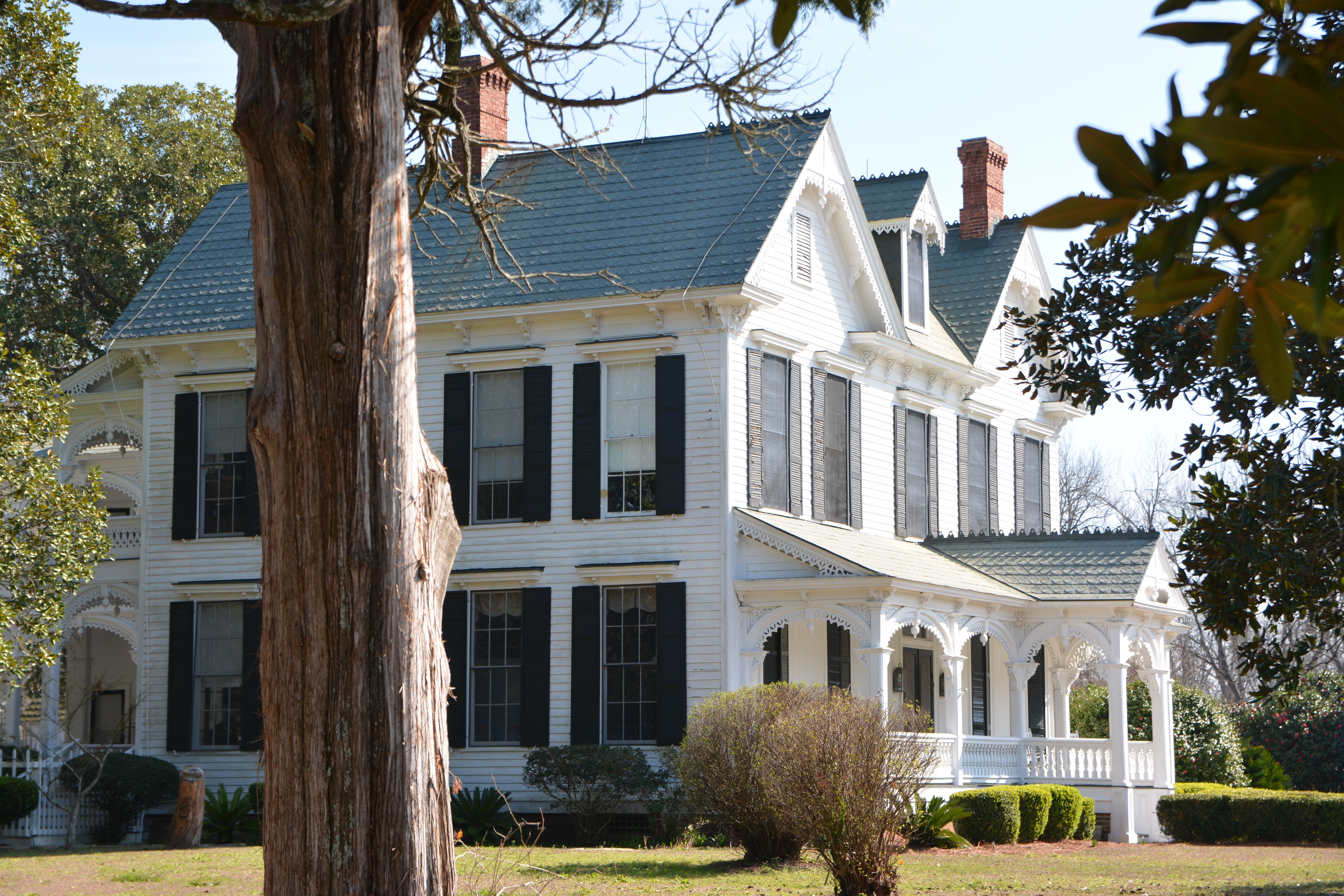

It has an L-shaped main section and a rectangular rear addition. The house was built by Walter T. McArthur (1837–1894), who inherited the property in 1877 and developed it as an element of the family's lumber plantation. The property was sold in 1917 to Emory Winship (1872–1932) who used it as a hunting estate.
