= Wheeler County Courthouse =

Historic courthouse in the US state of Georgia

- U.S. National Register of Historic Places
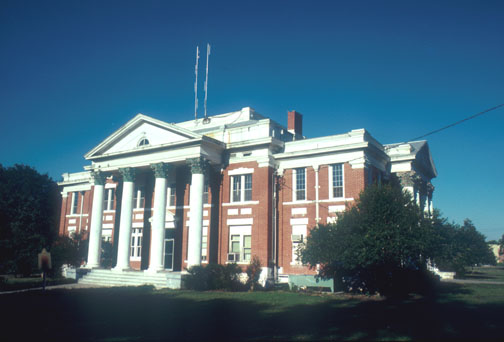
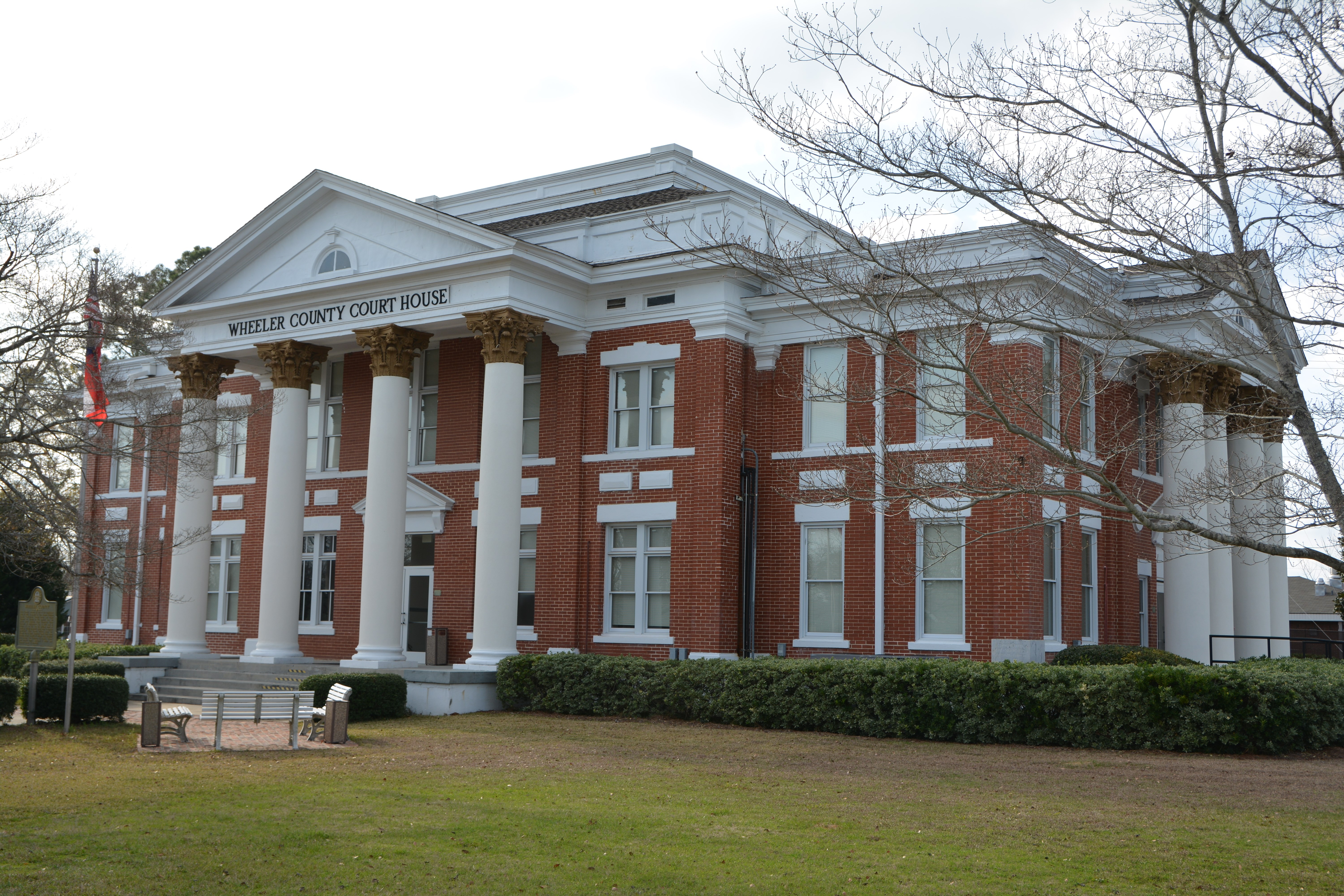
- Wheeler County Courthouse in a 1980 photograph by Calvin Beale The courthouse in 2017

- Location within Georgia Location within the United States
- Location: Pearl St., Alamo, Georgia
- Coordinates: 32.14813°N 82.78230°W
- Area: 1.5 acres (0.61 ha)
- Built: 1917
- Architectural style: Neoclassical
- MPS: Georgia County Courthouses TR
- NRHP reference No.: 80001263
- Added to NRHP: September 18, 1980

Wheeler County Courthouse is a historic county courthouse built in 1914 shortly after Alamo, Georgia was designated the county seat of newly established Wheeler County, Georgia. Located at 119 Pearl Street, it was designed the previous year by Ed Hosford as his last Georgia courthouse design, and is a brick structure with a columned facade on each side.

It burned down in 1916 and rebuilt in 1917 using a design by Frank P. Milburn in the Neoclassical style. It was renovated in 1961, and was added to the National Register of Historic Places on September 18, 1980. The nomination described it as "relatively lavishly ornamented" relative to other Georgia courthouses, including in its pilasters and the elaborateness of its Corinthian capitals.
