= Rhine, Georgia =

- Town
- Location in Dodge County and the state of Georgia
- Coordinates: 31°59′23″N 83°11′56″W
- Country: United States
- State: Georgia
- County: Dodge

Area
  - Total: 3.14 sq mi (8.14 km^{2})
  - Land: 3.14 sq mi (8.12 km^{2})
  - Water: 0.0077 sq mi (0.02 km^{2})
- Elevation: 243 ft (74 m)

Population (2020)
  - Total: 295
  - Density: 94.1/sq mi (36.34/km^{2})
- Time zone: UTC−5 (Eastern (EST))
  - Summer (DST): UTC−4 (EDT)
- ZIP Code: 31077
- Area code: 229
- FIPS code: 13-64932
- GNIS feature ID: 0321548

Rhine is a town in Dodge County, Georgia, United States. The population was 295 in 2020.

== History ==
A post office called Rhine was established in 1890. The community was named after the Rhine river, in Germany, the native land of a large share of the first settlers. The Georgia General Assembly incorporated Rhine as a town in 1891.

== Geography ==
Rhine is located in southern Dodge County at 31°59′23″N 83°11′56″W (31.989696, -83.198762). U.S. Route 280 passes through the town, leading west 6 miles (10 km) to Abbeville and east 8 miles (13 km) to Milan. Georgia State Route 117 crosses US 280 in the center of Rhine, leading north 15 miles (24 km) to Eastman, the Dodge County seat, and southeast 19 miles (31 km) to Jacksonville, Georgia. State Route 165 diverges from SR 117 in the north part of town and leads 11 miles (18 km) northeast to Chauncey.

According to the United States Census Bureau, the town of Rhine has a total area of 3.1 square miles (8.1 km^{2}), all land.

== Demographics ==
Historical population
Census	Pop.	Note	%±
1900	191		—
1910	321		68.1%
1920	396		23.4%
1930	450		13.6%
1940	463		2.9%
1950	514		11.0%
1960	485		−5.6%
1970	471		−2.9%
1980	590		25.3%
1990	466		−21.0%
2000	422		−9.4%
2010	394		−6.6%
2020	295		−25.1%
U.S. Decennial Census

=== Racial and ethnic composition ===
Rhine town, Georgia – Racial and ethnic composition Note: the US Census treats Hispanic/Latino as an ethnic category. This table excludes Latinos from the racial categories and assigns them to a separate category. Hispanics/Latinos may be of any race.
Race / Ethnicity (NH = Non-Hispanic)	Pop 2000	Pop 2010	Pop 2020	% 2000	% 2010	% 2020
White alone (NH)	281	255	200	66.59%	64.72%	67.80%
Black or African American alone (NH)	136	118	74	32.23%	29.95%	25.08%
Native American or Alaska Native alone (NH)	0	1	0	0.00%	0.25%	0.00%
Asian alone (NH)	0	0	0	0.00%	0.00%	0.00%
Native Hawaiian or Pacific Islander alone (NH)	0	0	0	0.00%	0.00%	0.00%
Other race alone (NH)	0	0	0	0.00%	0.00%	0.00%
Mixed race or Multiracial (NH)	1	1	7	0.24%	0.25%	2.37%
Hispanic or Latino (any race)	4	19	14	0.95%	4.82%	4.75%
Total	422	394	295	100.00%	100.00%	100.00%

As of the census of 2000, there were 422 people, 183 households, and 114 families residing in the town. By 2020, its population declined to 295.

== Cultural reference ==
Rhine gets mentioned in Tracy Byrd's song Watermelon Crawl as the place where the annual watermelon festival takes place.
