= Towns, Georgia =

Unincorporated community in Georgia, U.S.

Coordinates: 32°00′16″N 82°45′17″W

Towns is an unincorporated community in Telfair County, in the U.S. state of Georgia.

== History ==
A post office called Towns was established in 1870, and remained in operation until 1953. Johnson C. Towns, an early postmaster, gave the community his last name.
