= China Hill, Georgia =

Unincorporated community in Georgia, U.S.

Coordinates: 31°51′11″N 83°05′04″W

China Hill is an unincorporated community in Telfair County, in the U.S. state of Georgia.

== History ==
A post office called Chinahill was established in 1876, and remained in operation until 1904. The community was named for a grove of chinaberry trees near the original town site.
