= McRae Correctional Institution =

Private men's prison in Georgia, USA

Coordinates: 32°03′16″N 82°52′39″W

McRae Correctional Facility
- Interactive map of McRae Correctional Facility
- Location: 1000 Jim Hammock Drive McRae-Helena, Georgia
- Status: open
- Security class: low security
- Capacity: 2275
- Opened: 2000
- Managed by: CoreCivic

McRae Correctional Facility is a privately managed, low-security prison for men, owned and operated by the CoreCivic since 2000 under contract with the United States Federal Bureau of Prisons for federal prisoners.

The maximum capacity of the prison is 2275. It stands in McRae-Helena, Telfair County, Georgia.

In 2014 Azadeh N. Shahshahani of the ACLU of Georgia reported that McRae and another private federal prison in Georgia showed "a record of violations of constitutional and Bureau of Prisons standards governing the medical treatment of prisoners" and other issues. McRae is known as a "criminal alien requirement" (CAR) prison, meaning that it houses only aliens who will face deportation once they complete their sentences.

In August 2016, Justice Department officials announced that the FBOP would be phasing out its use of contracted facilities, on the grounds that private prisons provided less safe and less effective services with no substantial cost savings. The agency expects to allow current contracts on its thirteen remaining private facilities to expire.

== Notable inmates ==
Jamaican musician Mark Myrie aka Buju Banton
