= Wheeler County, Georgia =

County in Georgia, United States

- County
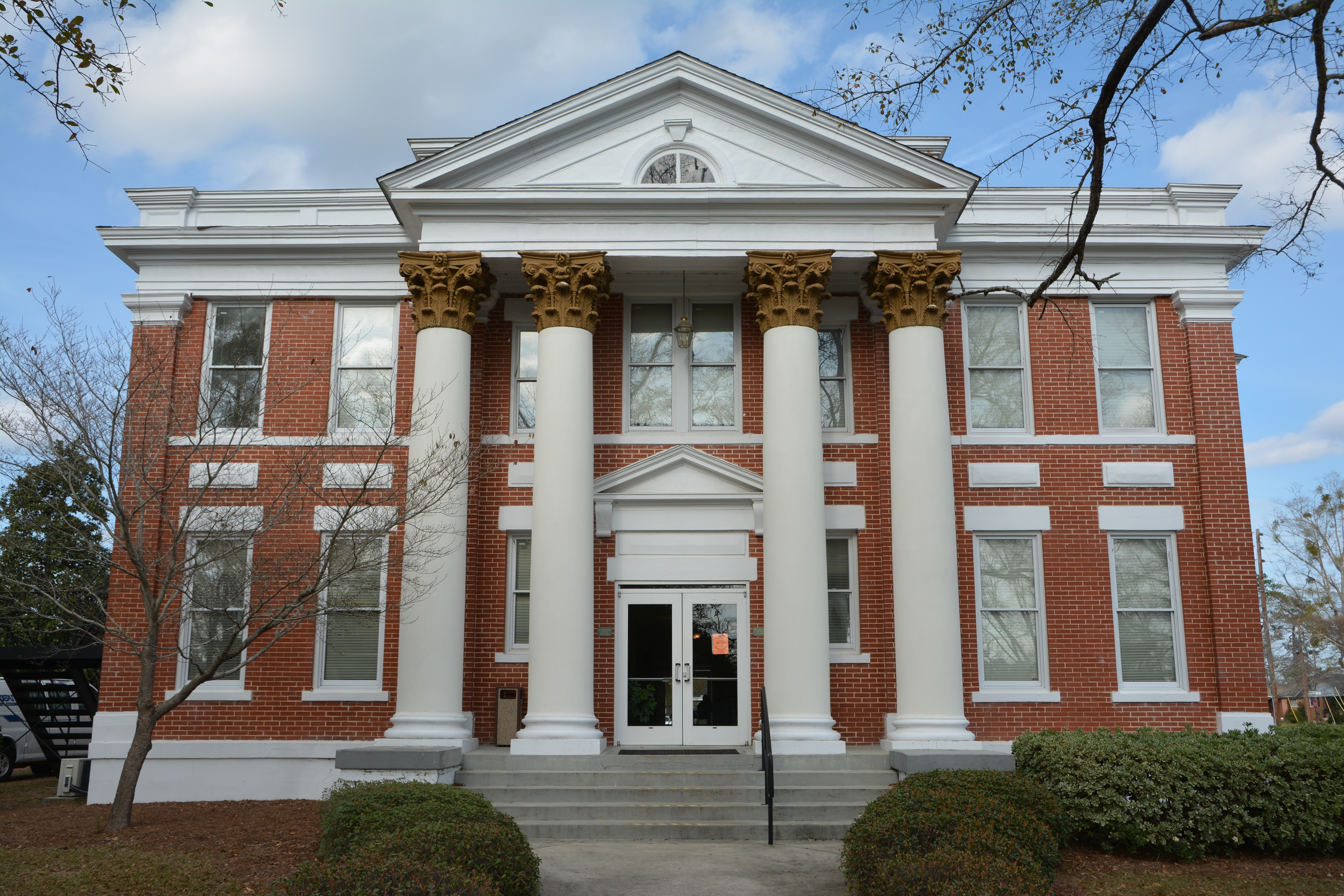
- Wheeler County Courthouse (built 1917), Alamo

- Location within the U.S. state of Georgia
- Coordinates: 32°07′N 82°43′W
- Country: United States
- State: Georgia
- Founded: November 5, 1912; 113 years ago
- Named for: Joseph Wheeler
- Seat: Alamo
- Largest city: Alamo

Area
  - Total: 300 sq mi (780 km^{2})
  - Land: 295 sq mi (760 km^{2})
  - Water: 4.8 sq mi (12 km^{2}) 1.6%

Population (2020)
  - Total: 7,471
  - Estimate (2025): 7,570 ▲
  - Density: 25/sq mi (9.7/km^{2})
- Time zone: UTC−5 (Eastern)
  - Summer (DST): UTC−4 (EDT)
- Congressional district: 12th
- Website: wheelercounty.org

Wheeler County is a county located in the southern portion of the U.S. state of Georgia. As of the 2020 census, the population was 7,471. The county seat is Alamo.

== History ==
Wheeler County is named after Confederate General Joseph Wheeler. The constitutional amendment to create the county was proposed August 14, 1912, and ratified November 5, 1912.

== Geography ==
According to the U.S. Census Bureau, the county has a total area of 300 square miles (780 km^{2}), of which 295 square miles (760 km^{2}) is land and 4.8 square miles (12 km^{2}) (1.6%) is water.

The eastern portion of Wheeler County, defined by a line running from north of Alamo to the southern border of the county, due south of Mount Vernon, is located in the Lower Oconee River sub-basin of the Altamaha River basin. The bulk of the rest of the county is located in the Little Ocmulgee River sub-basin of the same Altamaha River basin, except for a small southern portion of Wheeler County, east of Lumber City, which is located in the Lower Ocmulgee River sub-basin of the larger Altamaha River basin.

=== Major highways ===
- U.S. Route 280 / State Route 30
- U.S. Route 319 / U.S. Route 441 / State Route 31
- State Route 19
- State Route 46
- State Route 126
- State Route 149

=== Adjacent counties ===
- Treutlen County (north)
- Montgomery County (east)
- Jeff Davis County (southeast)
- Telfair County (southwest)
- Dodge County (west)
- Laurens County (north)

== Communities ==
=== City ===
- Glenwood
- McRae-Helena‡
- Scotland‡

‡This populated place also has portions in an adjacent county or counties

=== Town ===
- Alamo (county seat)

== Demographics ==
Historical population
Census	Pop.	Note	%±
1920	9,817		—
1930	9,149		−6.8%
1940	8,535		−6.7%
1950	6,712		−21.4%
1960	5,342		−20.4%
1970	4,596		−14.0%
1980	5,155		12.2%
1990	4,903		−4.9%
2000	6,179		26.0%
2010	7,421		20.1%
2020	7,471		0.7%
2025 (est.)	7,570	▲	1.3%
U.S. Decennial Census; 1790-1880 1890-1910; 1920-1930 1930-1940; 1940-1950 1960-1980; 1980-2000 2010

=== Racial and ethnic composition ===
Wheeler County, Georgia – Racial and ethnic composition Note: the US Census treats Hispanic/Latino as an ethnic category. This table excludes Latinos from the racial categories and assigns them to a separate category. Hispanics/Latinos may be of any race.
Race / Ethnicity (NH = Non-Hispanic)	Pop 1980	Pop 1990	Pop 2000	Pop 2010	Pop 2020	% 1980	% 1990	% 2000	% 2010	% 2020
White alone (NH)	3,606	3,319	3,866	4,405	4,157	69.95%	67.69%	62.57%	59.36%	55.64%
Black or African American alone (NH)	1,504	1,473	2,045	2,582	2,875	29.18%	30.04%	33.10%	34.79%	38.48%
Native American or Alaska Native alone (NH)	4	4	7	6	9	0.08%	0.08%	0.11%	0.08%	0.12%
Asian alone (NH)	1	5	5	16	17	0.02%	0.10%	0.08%	0.22%	0.23%
Native Hawaiian or Pacific Islander alone (NH)	x	x	0	0	0	x	x	0.00%	0.00%	0.00%
Other race alone (NH)	2	1	4	2	6	0.04%	0.02%	0.06%	0.03%	0.08%
Mixed race or Multiracial (NH)	x	x	33	54	135	x	x	0.53%	0.73%	1.81%
Hispanic or Latino (any race)	38	101	219	356	272	0.74%	2.06%	3.54%	4.80%	3.64%
Total	5,155	4,903	6,179	7,421	7,471	100.00%	100.00%	100.00%	100.00%	100.00%

=== 2020 census ===
As of the 2020 census, the county had a population of 7,471. The median age was 39.9 years. 16.8% of residents were under the age of 18 and 14.3% of residents were 65 years of age or older. For every 100 females there were 186.7 males, and for every 100 females age 18 and over there were 209.6 males age 18 and over. 0.0% of residents lived in urban areas, while 100.0% lived in rural areas.

There were 2,054 households and 1,159 families residing in the county. Of those households, 32.4% had children under the age of 18 living with them and 29.7% had a female householder with no spouse or partner present. About 30.6% of all households were made up of individuals and 14.5% had someone living alone who was 65 years of age or older.

There were 2,420 housing units, of which 15.1% were vacant. Among occupied housing units, 71.1% were owner-occupied and 28.9% were renter-occupied. The homeowner vacancy rate was 1.4% and the rental vacancy rate was 10.6%.

The racial makeup of the county was 56.6% White, 38.6% Black or African American, 0.4% American Indian and Alaska Native, 0.2% Asian, 0.0% Native Hawaiian and Pacific Islander, 2.0% from some other race, and 2.2% from two or more races. Hispanic or Latino residents of any race comprised 3.6% of the population.

=== 2010 census ===
At the 2010 census, there were 7,421 people, 2,152 households, and 1,519 families living in the county. The population density was 25.1 inhabitants per square mile (9.7/km^{2}). There were 2,625 housing units at an average density of 8.9 per square mile (3.4/km^{2}). The racial makeup of the county was 61.3% white, 35.2% black or African American, 0.2% Asian, 0.1% American Indian, 2.3% from other races, and 0.8% from two or more races. Those of Hispanic or Latino origin made up 4.8% of the population. In terms of ancestry, 32.4% were English, and 8.1% were American. Of the 2,152 households, 34.2% had children under the age of 18 living with them, 49.6% were married couples living together, 15.5% had a female householder with no husband present, 29.4% were non-families, and 26.0% of households were made up of individuals. The average household size was 2.54 and the average family size was 3.05. The median age was 37.9 years.

The median household income was $35,422 and the median family income was $45,042. Males had a median income of $35,114 versus $25,329 for females. The per capita income for the county was $10,043. About 14.3% of families and 24.3% of the population were below the poverty line, including 31.6% of those under age 18 and 36.4% of those age 65 or over.

=== 2000 census ===
At the 2000 census there were 6,179 people, 2,011 households, and 1,395 families living in the county. The population density was 21 people per square mile (8/km^{2}). There were 2,447 housing units at an average density of 8 per square mile (3/km^{2}). The racial makeup of the county was 64.56% White, 33.18% Black or African American, 0.13% Native American, 0.10% Asian, 1.25% from other races, and 0.79% from two or more races. 3.54% of the population were Hispanic or Latino of any race. Of the 2,011 households 32.60% had children under the age of 18 living with them, 52.10% were married couples living together, 13.00% had a female householder with no husband present, and 30.60% were non-families. 27.80% of households were one person and 14.80% were one person aged 65 or older. The average household size was 2.54 and the average family size was 3.08.

The age distribution was 22.40% under the age of 18, 10.20% from 18 to 24, 31.60% from 25 to 44, 23.10% from 45 to 64, and 12.70% 65 or older. The median age was 36 years. For every 100 females there were 128.10 males. For every 100 females age 18 and over, there were 139.80 males.

The median household income was $24,053 and the median family income was $29,696. Males had a median income of $27,203 versus $22,679 for females. The per capita income for the county was $13,005. About 21.60% of families and 25.30% of the population were below the poverty line, including 30.20% of those under age 18 and 26.70% of those age 65 or over.

== Politics ==
As of the 2020s, Wheeler County is a Republican stronghold, voting 72% for Donald Trump in 2024. For elections to the United States House of Representatives, Wheeler County is part of Georgia's 12th congressional district, currently represented by Rick Allen. For elections to the Georgia State Senate, Wheeler County is part of District 19. For elections to the Georgia House of Representatives, Wheeler County is part of District 156.

United States presidential election results for Wheeler County, Georgia
Year	Republican		Democratic		Third party(ies)	
Year	No.	%	No.	%	No.	%
1916	40	9.03%	372	83.97%	31	7.00%
1920	101	22.39%	350	77.61%	0	0.00%
1924	0	0.00%	772	88.84%	97	11.16%
1928	101	24.46%	312	75.54%	0	0.00%
1932	29	2.51%	1,127	97.41%	1	0.09%
1936	94	13.64%	594	86.21%	1	0.15%
1940	117	19.02%	495	80.49%	3	0.49%
1944	151	22.60%	517	77.40%	0	0.00%
1948	39	4.41%	560	63.28%	286	32.32%
1952	261	16.94%	1,280	83.06%	0	0.00%
1956	149	13.06%	992	86.94%	0	0.00%
1960	226	18.90%	970	81.10%	0	0.00%
1964	849	46.42%	980	53.58%	0	0.00%
1968	251	15.00%	488	29.17%	934	55.83%
1972	1,093	78.80%	294	21.20%	0	0.00%
1976	344	19.98%	1,378	80.02%	0	0.00%
1980	550	25.16%	1,599	73.15%	37	1.69%
1984	833	51.84%	774	48.16%	0	0.00%
1988	709	51.64%	658	47.92%	6	0.44%
1992	601	35.37%	880	51.80%	218	12.83%
1996	460	33.90%	751	55.34%	146	10.76%
2000	813	51.62%	752	47.75%	10	0.63%
2004	1,192	58.03%	847	41.24%	15	0.73%
2008	1,408	63.60%	794	35.86%	12	0.54%
2012	1,366	63.09%	772	35.66%	27	1.25%
2016	1,421	67.60%	646	30.73%	35	1.67%
2020	1,583	69.28%	689	30.15%	13	0.57%
2024	1,648	72.41%	622	27.33%	6	0.26%

United States Senate election results for Wheeler County, Georgia2
Year	Republican		Democratic		Third party(ies)	
Year	No.	%	No.	%	No.	%
2020	1,562	69.30%	657	29.15%	35	1.55%
2020	1,382	68.79%	627	31.21%	0	0.00%

United States Senate election results for Wheeler County, Georgia3
Year	Republican		Democratic		Third party(ies)	
Year	No.	%	No.	%	No.	%
2020	694	31.11%	460	20.62%	1,077	48.27%
2020	1,583	69.67%	689	30.33%	0	0.00%
2022	1,266	69.68%	534	29.39%	17	0.94%
2022	1,231	71.45%	492	28.55%	0	0.00%

Georgia Gubernatorial election results for Wheeler County
Year	Republican		Democratic		Third party(ies)	
Year	No.	%	No.	%	No.	%
2022	1,318	72.18%	501	27.44%	7	0.38%

== Education ==
The Wheeler County School District includes Wheeler County Elementary School and Wheeler County High School.

== See also ==
- National Register of Historic Places listings in Wheeler County, Georgia
- List of counties in Georgia
