= Alamo, Georgia =

- Town
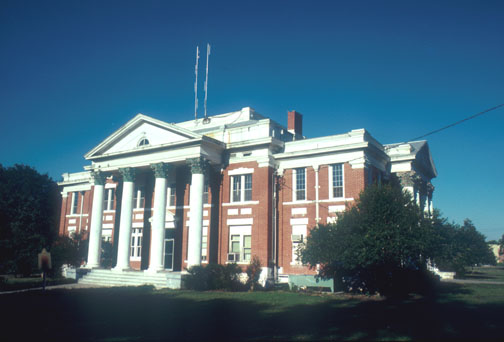
- Wheeler County Courthouse (Built 1917), Alamo, Georgia

- Location in Wheeler County and the state of Georgia
- Coordinates: 32°8′54″N 82°46′43″W
- Country: United States
- State: Georgia
- County: Wheeler

Area
  - Total: 2.01 sq mi (5.21 km^{2})
  - Land: 1.96 sq mi (5.07 km^{2})
  - Water: 0.054 sq mi (0.14 km^{2})
- Elevation: 230 ft (70 m)

Population (2020)
  - Total: 771
  - Density: 393.5/sq mi (151.94/km^{2})
- Time zone: UTC-5 (Eastern (EST))
  - Summer (DST): UTC-4 (EDT)
- ZIP code: 30411
- Area code: 912
- FIPS code: 13-00996
- GNIS feature ID: 0331008
- Website: https://www.cityofalamo.us/

Alamo is a town in Wheeler County, Georgia, United States. As of the 2020 census, the town had a population of 771. The town is the county seat of Wheeler County.

== History ==
Alamo was founded in 1890 as a stop on the Seaboard Air Line Railroad. It was named for the Alamo Mission in San Antonio, Texas. Alamo was chartered in 1909.

Alamo's courthouse was built in 1917 and is on the National Register of Historical Places. The Lamplighter Little Theatre dates back to 1919.

== Geography ==
Alamo is located at 32°8′54″N 82°46′43″W.

According to the United States Census Bureau, the city has a total area of 1.9 square miles (4.9 km^{2}), of which, 1.9 square miles (4.9 km^{2}) is land and 0.52% is water.

The main soil in and around Alamo is Tifton loamy sand.

== Demographics ==
Historical population
Census	Pop.	Note	%±
1910	249		—
1920	563		126.1%
1930	613		8.9%
1940	646		5.4%
1950	800		23.8%
1960	822		2.8%
1970	833		1.3%
1980	993		19.2%
1990	855		−13.9%
2000	1,943		127.3%
2010	2,797		44.0%
2020	771		−72.4%
2023 (est.)	2,811	▲	264.6%
U.S. Decennial Census; 1850-1870 1870-1880; 1890-1910 1920-1930; 1940 1950 1960; 1970 1980 1990; 2000 2010 2020

=== Racial and ethnic composition ===
Alamo town, Georgia – Racial and ethnic composition Note: the US Census treats Hispanic/Latino as an ethnic category. This table excludes Latinos from the racial categories and assigns them to a separate category. Hispanics/Latinos may be of any race.
Race / Ethnicity (NH = Non-Hispanic)	Pop 2000	Pop 2010	Pop 2020	% 2010	% 2010	% 2020
White alone (NH)	895	1,077	349	46.06%	38.51%	45.27%
Black or African American alone (NH)	1,021	1,587	361	52.55%	56.74%	46.82%
Native American or Alaska Native alone (NH)	0	0	2	0.00%	0.00%	0.26%
Asian alone (NH)	0	3	2	0.00%	0.11%	0.26%
Native Hawaiian or Pacific Islander alone (NH)	0	0	0	0.00%	0.00%	0.00%
Other race alone (NH)	0	2	0	0.00%	0.07%	0.00%
Mixed race or Multiracial (NH)	9	7	19	0.46%	0.25%	2.46%
Hispanic or Latino (any race)	18	121	38	0.93%	4.33%	4.93%
Total	1,943	2,797	771	100.00%	100.00%	100.00%

=== 2020 census ===
As of the 2020 United States census, there were 771 people, 760 households, and 492 families residing in the town.

== Education ==
=== Wheeler County School District ===
The Wheeler County School District holds grades pre-school to grade 12, and consists of one elementary school and a middle-high school. The district has 82 full-time teachers and over 1,150 students.

- Wheeler County Elementary School
- Wheeler County High School
