= Telfair County High School =

Public high school in McRae–Helena, Georgia, United States

Location
- 458 South 3rd Avenue; McRae–Helena, Georgia 31055; United States
- Coordinates: 32.0466°N 82.9110°W

Information
- Type: Public high school
- School district: Telfair County School District
- Principal: Eric Cowart
- Faculty: 30
- Grades: 9 - 12
- Enrollment: 385 (2023-2024)
- Color
- Athletics conference: GHSA Class A Public Region 4
- Nickname: Trojans
- Information: (229) 868-6096
- Website: School website

Telfair County High School is located in McRae–Helena, Georgia, United States. It is the only high school in the Telfair County School District. Its teams are known as the Trojans. It shares a campus with its feeder school, Telfair County Middle School.

== Athletics ==
The Telfair County Trojans field the following sports teams:

- Baseball
- Basketball (Boys & Girls)
- Cross Country (Boys & Girls)
- Football
- Golf (Boys & Girls)
- Softball
- Tennis (Boys & Girls)
- Track & Field (Boys & Girls)
- Wrestling

== Postseason success ==
The Trojans' sports teams have found postseason success a number of times in school history, with notable successes outlined below:

- Baseball: 4 Sweet Sixteen Appearances, 2 Elite Eight appearances, 1 Final Four appearance, Class A State Runner-Up (2018), Region 2-A Champion (2008).
- Basketball:
- Cross Country (Boys):
- Cross County (Girls):
- Football: 1 Sweet Sixteen appearance, 1 Elite Eight appearance, 2 Region Championships (1992, 1993)
- Golf (Boys):
- Golf (Girls):
- Fastpitch Softball: 3 Region Championships, 5 Sweet Sixteen appearances, 4 Elite Eight appearances, 2 Final Four appearances
- Tennis (Boys):
- Tennis (Girls):
- Track & Field (Boys):
- Track & Field (Girls):
- Wrestling:
