= Chauncey, Georgia =

- City
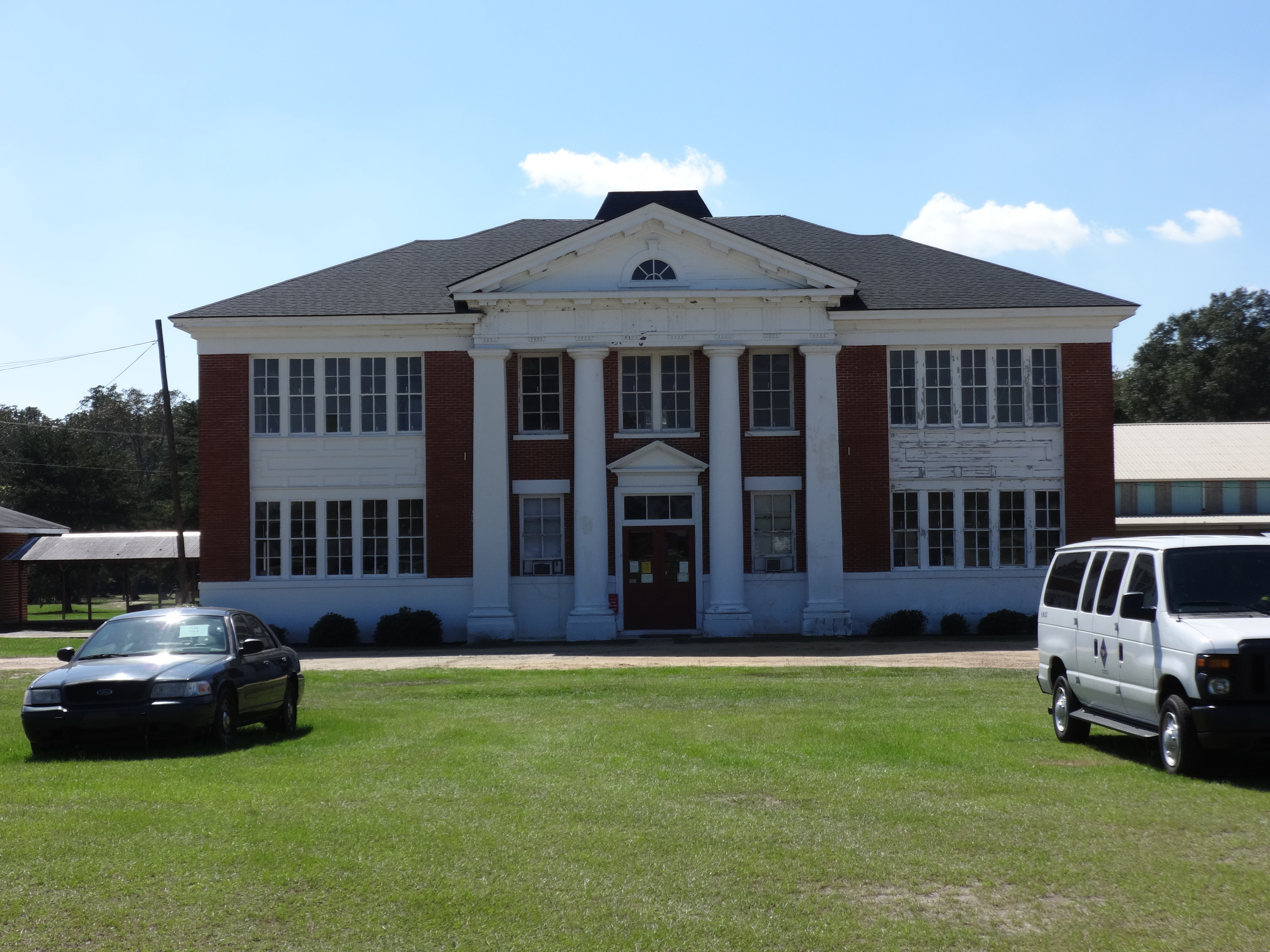
- Chauncey City Hall at Old Chauncey School

- Location in Dodge County and the state of Georgia
- Coordinates: 32°6′18″N 83°3′58″W
- Country: United States
- State: Georgia
- County: Dodge

Government
  - Type: Mayor-Council
  - Mayor: Harrell Burch

Area
  - Total: 1.73 sq mi (4.47 km^{2})
  - Land: 1.73 sq mi (4.47 km^{2})
  - Water: 0 sq mi (0.00 km^{2})
- Elevation: 308 ft (94 m)

Population (2020)
  - Total: 289
  - Density: 167.5/sq mi (64.66/km^{2})
- Time zone: UTC-5 (Eastern (EST))
  - Summer (DST): UTC-4 (EDT)
- ZIP code: 31011
- Area codes: 229, 478
- FIPS code: 13-15648
- GNIS feature ID: 0312593

Chauncey is a city in Dodge County, Georgia, United States. The population was 289 at the 2020 census. It was formed around station number twelve on the Macon and Brunswick Railroad.

== History ==
The Georgia General Assembly incorporated the "Town of Chauncey" in 1883. The community was named after William Chauncey, a businessperson in the local lumber industry.

== Geography ==
Chauncey is located in southeastern Dodge County at 32°6′18″N 83°3′58″W (32.104972, -83.065991). U.S. Routes 23 and 341 pass concurrently through the center of town, leading northwest 9 miles (14 km) to Eastman, the county seat, and east 10 miles (16 km) to McRae. Sugar Creek runs along the southwest border of the city.

According to the United States Census Bureau, Chauncey has a total area of 1.7 square miles (4.5 km^{2}), all of it land.

== Demographics ==
Historical population
Census	Pop.	Note	%±
1890	683		—
1900	422		−38.2%
1910	350		−17.1%
1920	408		16.6%
1930	397		−2.7%
1940	387		−2.5%
1950	348		−10.1%
1960	330		−5.2%
1970	308		−6.7%
1980	350		13.6%
1990	312		−10.9%
2000	295		−5.4%
2010	342		15.9%
2020	289		−15.5%
U.S. Decennial Census

Chauncey racial composition as of 2020
Race	Num.	Perc.
White (non-Hispanic)	169	58.48%
Black or African American (non-Hispanic)	100	34.6%
Asian	3	1.04%
Other/Mixed	4	1.38%
Hispanic or Latino	13	4.5%

As of the 2020 United States census, there were 289 people, 143 households, and 89 families residing in the city.
