= Scotland, Georgia =

- City
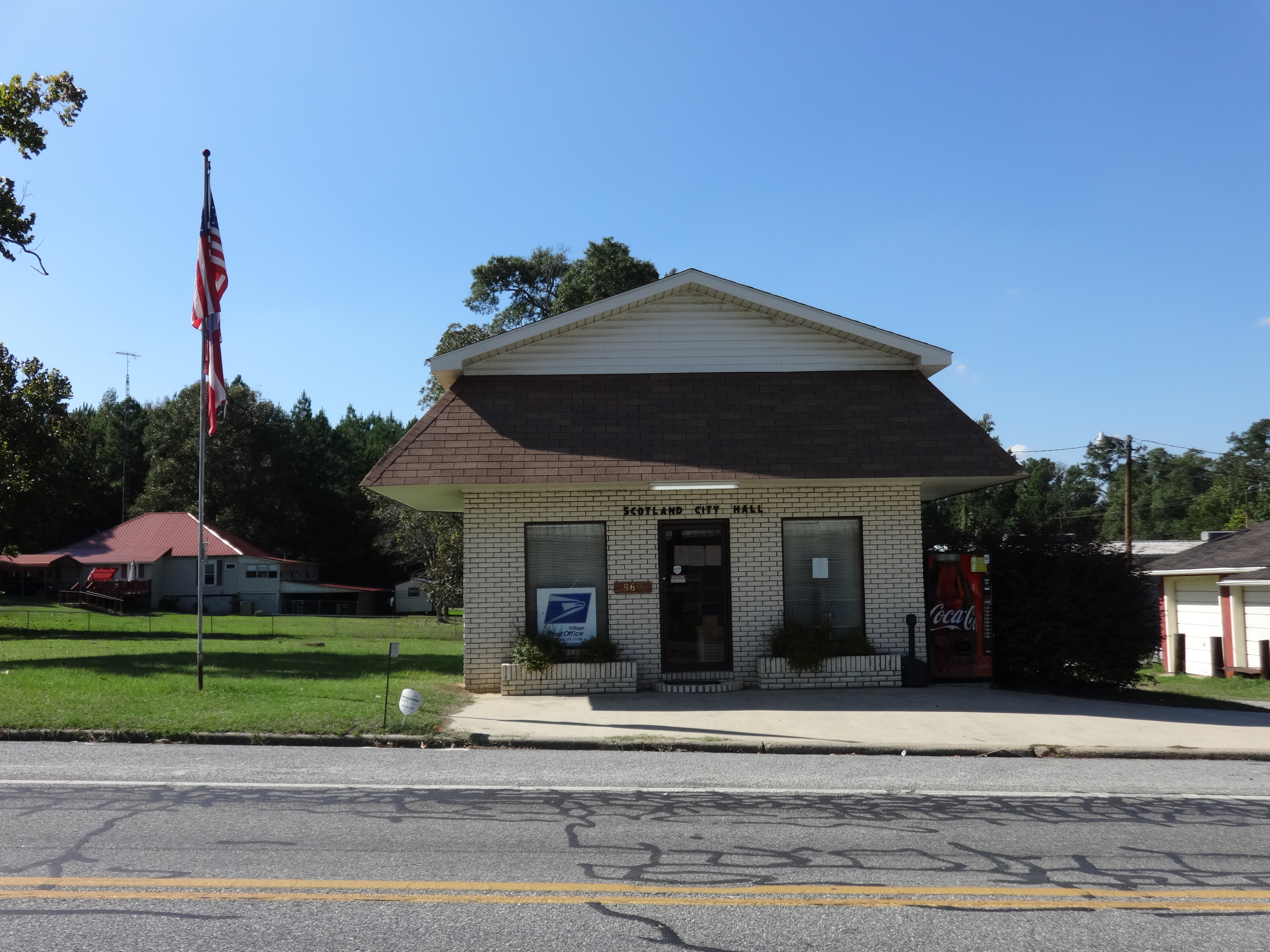
- Scotland City Hall

- Location in Telfair County and the state of Georgia
- Coordinates: 32°2′55″N 82°49′5″W
- Country: United States
- State: Georgia
- Counties: Telfair, Wheeler

Area
  - Total: 1.46 sq mi (3.78 km^{2})
  - Land: 1.43 sq mi (3.71 km^{2})
  - Water: 0.027 sq mi (0.07 km^{2})
- Elevation: 160 ft (50 m)

Population (2020)
  - Total: 173
  - Density: 120.6/sq mi (46.57/km^{2})
- Time zone: UTC-5 (Eastern (EST))
  - Summer (DST): UTC-4 (EDT)
- ZIP code: 31083
- Area code: 912
- FIPS code: 13-69336
- GNIS feature ID: 0356523

Scotland is a city in Telfair and Wheeler counties in the U.S. state of Georgia. As of 2020, its population was 173.

== History ==
Settled by Scottish Presbyterians shortly after the American Civil War, the community was first known as "McVille" due to the ancestry of most of the first residents. The community was later renamed Scotland to avoid confusion with nearby McRae, Georgia. The Georgia General Assembly incorporated Scotland as a town in 1911.

== Geography ==
Scotland is located at 32°2′55″N 82°49′5″W (32.048683, -82.818080).

According to the United States Census Bureau, the city has a total area of 1.4 square miles (3.6 km^{2}), of which 1.4 square miles (3.6 km^{2}) is land and 0.71% is water.

== Demographics ==
Historical population
| Census | Pop. | Note | %± |
|---|---|---|---|
| 1890 | 258 | | — |
| 1920 | 310 | | — |
| 1930 | 324 | | 4.5% |
| 1940 | 238 | | −26.5% |
| 1950 | 218 | | −8.4% |
| 1960 | 236 | | 8.3% |
| 1970 | 261 | | 10.6% |
| 1980 | 222 | | −14.9% |
| 1990 | 244 | | 9.9% |
| 2000 | 300 | | 23.0% |
| 2010 | 366 | | 22.0% |
| 2020 | 173 | | −52.7% |
U.S. Decennial Census

=== Racial and ethnic composition ===
Scotland city, Georgia – Racial and ethnic composition Note: the US Census treats Hispanic/Latino as an ethnic category. This table excludes Latinos from the racial categories and assigns them to a separate category. Hispanics/Latinos may be of any race.
| Race / Ethnicity (NH = Non-Hispanic) | Pop 2000 | Pop 2010 | Pop 2020 | % 2000 | % 2010 | % 2020 |
|---|---|---|---|---|---|---|
| White alone (NH) | 190 | 240 | 130 | 63.33% | 65.57% | 75.14% |
| Black or African American alone (NH) | 107 | 121 | 33 | 35.67% | 33.06% | 19.08% |
| Native American or Alaska Native alone (NH) | 0 | 0 | 0 | 0.00% | 0.00% | 0.00% |
| Asian alone (NH) | 0 | 0 | 0 | 0.00% | 0.00% | 0.00% |
| Native Hawaiian or Pacific Islander alone (NH) | 0 | 0 | 0 | 0.00% | 0.00% | 0.00% |
| Other race alone (NH) | 0 | 0 | 0 | 0.00% | 0.00% | 0.00% |
| Mixed race or Multiracial (NH) | 0 | 0 | 7 | 0.00% | 0.00% | 4.05% |
| Hispanic or Latino (any race) | 3 | 5 | 3 | 1.00% | 1.37% | 1.73% |
| Total | 300 | 366 | 173 | 100.00% | 100.00% | 100.00% |

=== 2000 census ===
As of the census of 2000, there were 300 people, 111 households, and 81 families residing in the city. In 2020, its population declined to 173.
