= McRae–Helena, Georgia =

- City
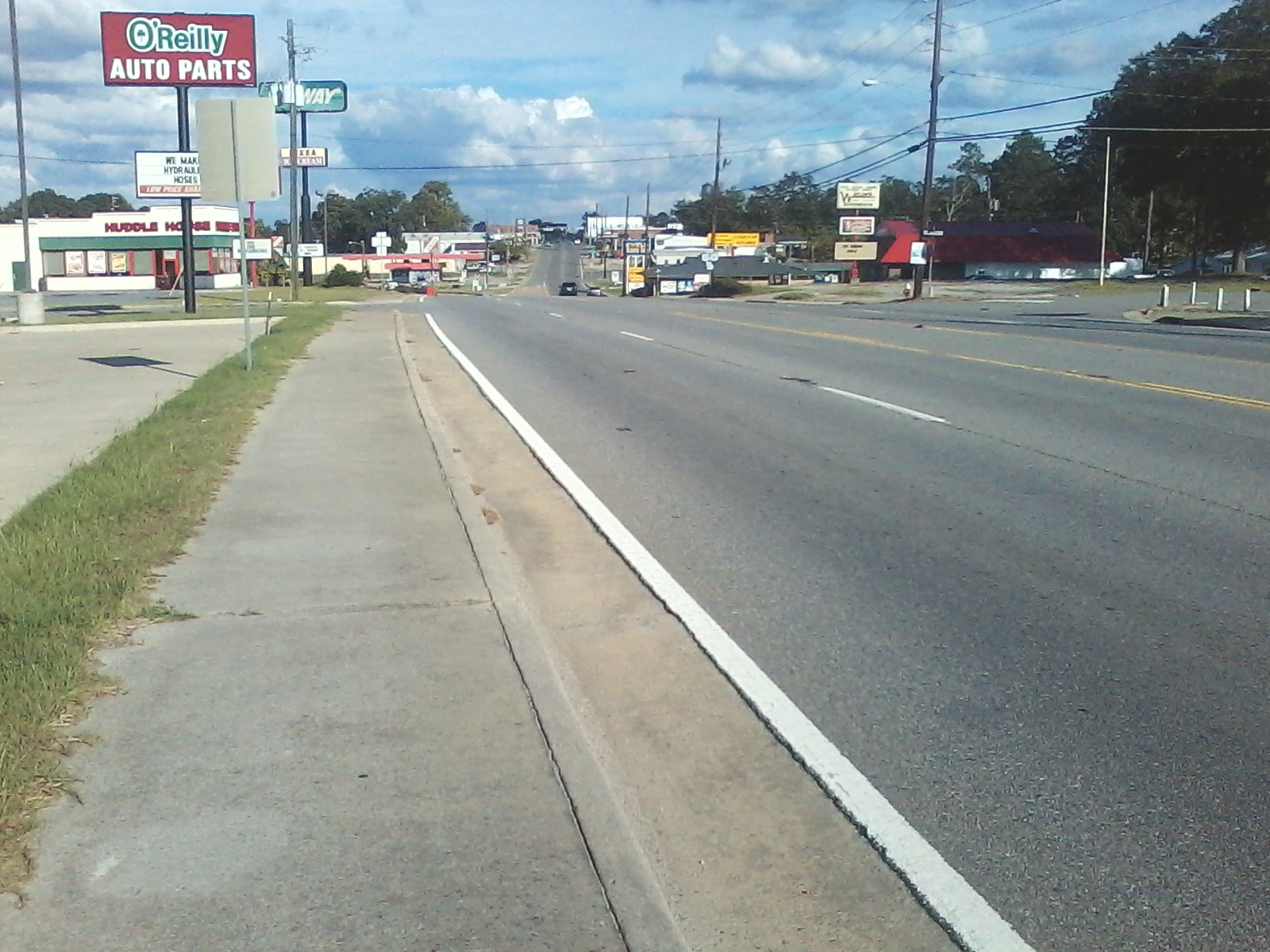
- Downtown McRae–Helena, Georgia
- Nickname: The Purple Heart City
- Motto: The Crossroads City
- Location in Georgia
- Coordinates: 32°04′10″N 82°54′10″W
- Country: United States
- State: Georgia
- County: Telfair, Wheeler

Government
  - Mayor: Mike Young
  - City Manager: Lance Jones (Interim)

Area
  - Total: 6.53 sq mi (16.92 km^{2})
  - Land: 6.44 sq mi (16.67 km^{2})
  - Water: 0.097 sq mi (0.25 km^{2})

Population (2020)
  - Total: 6,253
  - Density: 971.6/sq mi (375.15/km^{2})
- ZIP code: 31055
- Area codes: 229, 912
- FIPS code: 13-49100
- Website: mcraehelena.gov

McRae–Helena is a city in the U.S. state of Georgia, formed on January 1, 2015, by the merger of the two cities of McRae and Helena. McRae–Helena is the county seat of Telfair County.

It is the largest city in Telfair County, with a population of 6,253 in 2020. This includes the population held as inmates at McRae Correctional Institution.

== History ==
On January 1, 2015, McRae and the adjacent town of Helena merged to form McRae–Helena. This merge was initiated when Helena discovered it could no longer manage its wastewater supply. While it seemed to make sense to have nearby McRae take over Helena's water services, it would have not only reduced Helena's revenue, but left Helena with only two municipal services. The cities were united under House Bill 967, sponsored by Representative Jimmy Pruett of the 149th district. It was signed into law by Governor Nathan Deal on April 10, 2014.

== Geography ==
McRae–Helena is located in northern Telfair County at 32°3′52″N 82°53′54″W (32.064508, -82.898251).

According to the United States Census Bureau, the city has a total land area of 6.436 square miles (16.67 km^{2}) and a total area of 6.534 square miles (16.92 km^{2}). The Little Ocmulgee River flows just northeast of the city limits, while Sugar Creek passes through the southwest border of the city.

=== Transportation ===
Several highways travel through McRae–Helena Area. U.S. Route 23 (US 23), along with US 341/SR 27 travel through the city as a one-way pair using Martin Luther King Jr. Boulevard (formerly Railroad Street), heading northwest 20 miles (32 km) to Eastman and Oak Street heading southeast 24 miles (39 km) to Hazlehurst, while US 280/US 319/US 441/SR 30/SR 31 travel through as Third Avenue, crossing US 23/US 341/SR 27 in the center of the city. US 280/SR 30 heads northeast 33 miles (53 km) to Vidalia and west 55 miles (89 km) to Cordele, while US 319/US 441/SR 31 heads south 19 miles (31 km) to the small town of Jacksonville and north 35 miles (56 km) to Dublin.

Major railroad lines include the former Macon and Brunswick Railroad, now the Brunswick Division of Norfolk Southern Railway which passes through both former cities, and a former Seaboard Air Line Railroad line now owned by the Heart of Georgia Railroad that passed only through Helena. A junction between these lines exists in the former Helena.

== Sites of interest ==
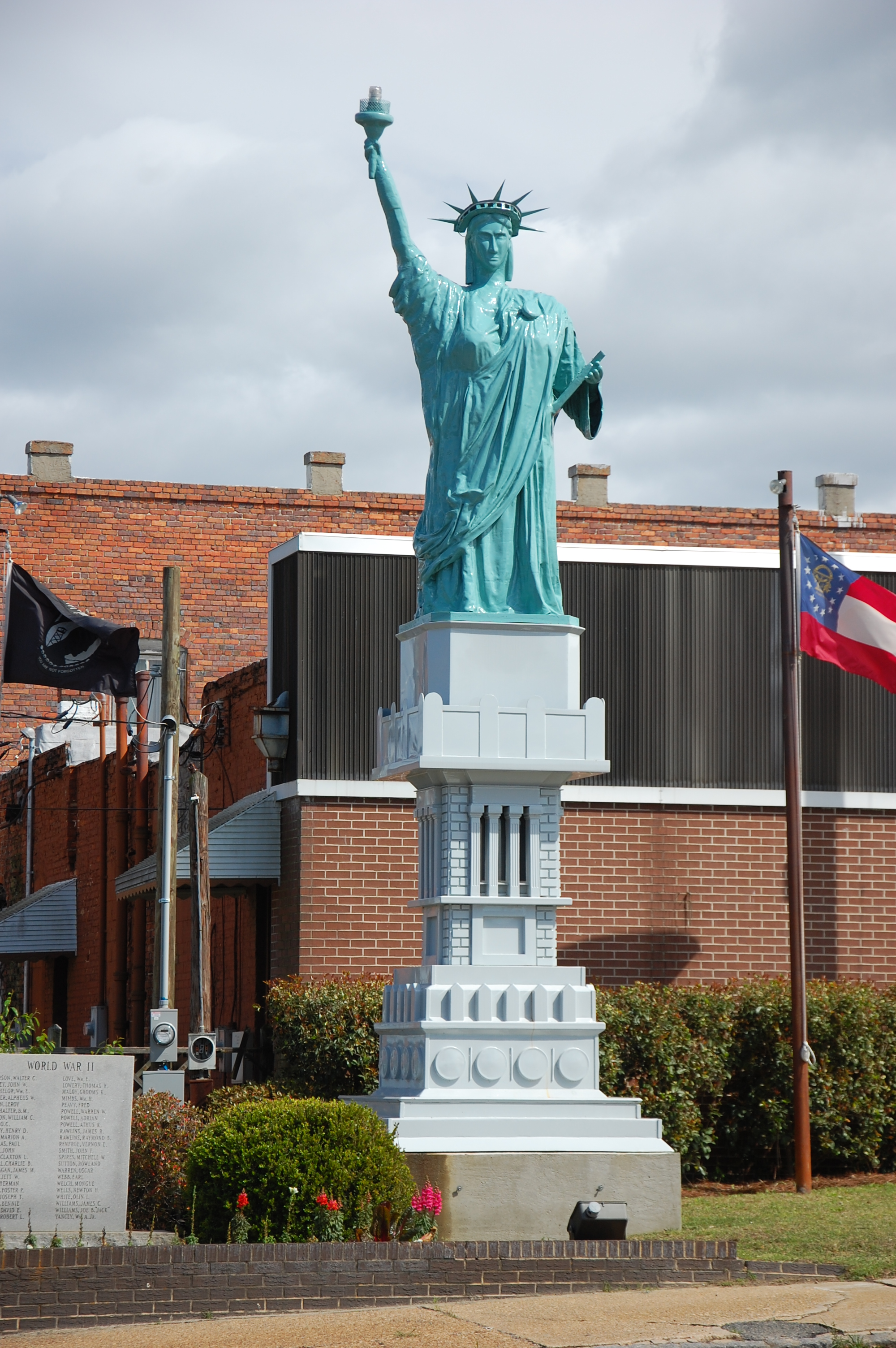
Model of Statue of Liberty

Located in downtown McRae–Helena is Liberty Square, home of a Statue of Liberty replica that is one-twelfth the size of the original. The square is also the site of a replica of the Liberty Bell and a marble memorial to Telfair County residents who died in military service.

On the outskirts of McRae–Helena is the Talmadge Home. This historic home was occupied by two former Georgia governors, Eugene Talmadge and Herman Eugene Talmadge. McRae–Helena was the birthplace of Marion B. Folsom (1893–1976), a longtime executive of the Eastman Kodak Company who served as the United States Secretary of Health, Education, and Welfare during the Eisenhower administration.

Famous railfan photographer William B. Folsom is buried in McRae–Helena.

== Education ==
=== Telfair County School District ===
The Telfair County School District holds pre-school to grade twelve, and consists of one elementary school, a middle school, and a high school. The district has 112 full-time teachers and over 1,648 students.

- Telfair County Elementary School
- Telfair County Middle School
- Telfair County High School
- Telfair County Pre-K

=== Higher education ===
- Oconee Fall Line Technical College - McRae–Helena Campus

== Demographics ==
Historical population
Census	Pop.	Note	%±
2020	6,253		—
2023 (est.)	4,759	▼	−23.9%
U.S. Decennial Census

McRae-Helena first appeared as a census designated place in the 2020 U.S. census.

=== Racial and ethnic composition ===
McRae-Helena city, Georgia – Racial and ethnic composition Note: the US Census treats Hispanic/Latino as an ethnic category. This table excludes Latinos from the racial categories and assigns them to a separate category. Hispanics/Latinos may be of any race.
Race / Ethnicity (NH = Non-Hispanic)	Pop 2020	2020
White alone (NH)	1,894	30.29%
Black or African American alone (NH)	2,513	40.19%
Native American or Alaska Native alone (NH)	19	0.30%
Asian alone (NH)	21	0.34%
Native Hawaiian or Pacific Islander alone (NH)	0	0.00%
Other race alone (NH)	7	0.11%
Mixed race or Multiracial (NH)	70	1.12%
Hispanic or Latino (any race)	1,729	27.65%
Total	6,253	100.00%

As of the 2022 American Community Survey estimates, there were 6,338 people and 1,215 households. The population density was 984.8 inhabitants per square mile (380.2/km^{2}). There were 1,843 housing units at an average density of 286.4 per square mile (110.6/km^{2}). The racial makeup of the city was 41.6% White, 34.0% Black or African American, 10.5% some other race, 0.2% Native American or Alaskan Native, and 0.2% Asian, with 13.5% from two or more races. Hispanics or Latinos of any race were 24.6% of the population.

Of the 1,215 households, 30.5% had children under the age of 18 living with them, 42.0% had seniors 65 years or older living with them, 40.3% were married couples living together, 2.1% were couples cohabitating, 18.1% had a male householder with no partner present, and 39.5% had a female householder with no partner present. The median household size was 3.49 and the median family size was 4.21.

The age distribution was 24.5% under 18, 6.6% from 18 to 24, 30.8% from 25 to 44, 23.9% from 45 to 64, and 14.2% who were 65 or older. The median age was 36.4 years. For every 100 females, there were 211.1 males.

The median income for a family household was $54,583 and the median income for a non-family household was $15,590. The per capita income was $12,592. Males working full-time jobs had median earnings of $50,445 compared to $40,536 for females. Out of the 4,184 people with a determined poverty status, 42.1% were below the poverty line. Further, 73.8% of minors and 28.0% of seniors were below the poverty line.

In the survey, residents self-identified with various ethnic ancestries. People of Scotch-Irish descent made up 13.7% of the population of the town, followed by American at 3.1%, English at 3.0%, Irish at 1.8%, and German at 0.9%.

== Economy ==
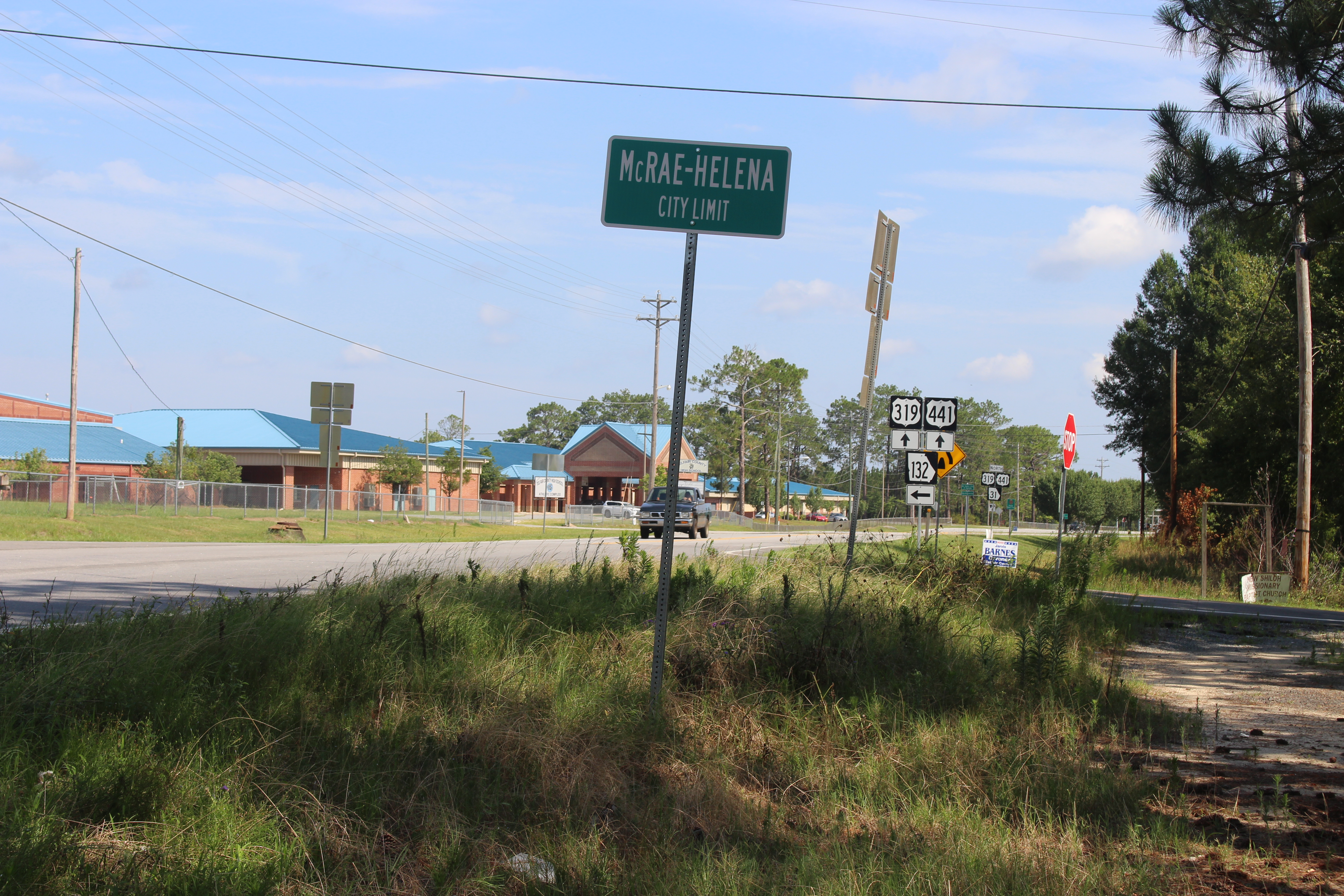
McRae-Helena city limits sign

Major employers in McRae–Helena include:

- McRae Correctional Institution
- City of McRae–Helena
- Coca-Cola Bottling Plant
- Golden Peanut Company
- Telfair State Prison
- Little Ocmulgee State Park
- Cook Petro
- Griffins Warehouse–McRae, LLC

== See also ==
- List of cities in Georgia (U.S. state)
- Telfair County Courthouse and Jail
