= Telfair County, Georgia =

County in Georgia, United States

- County
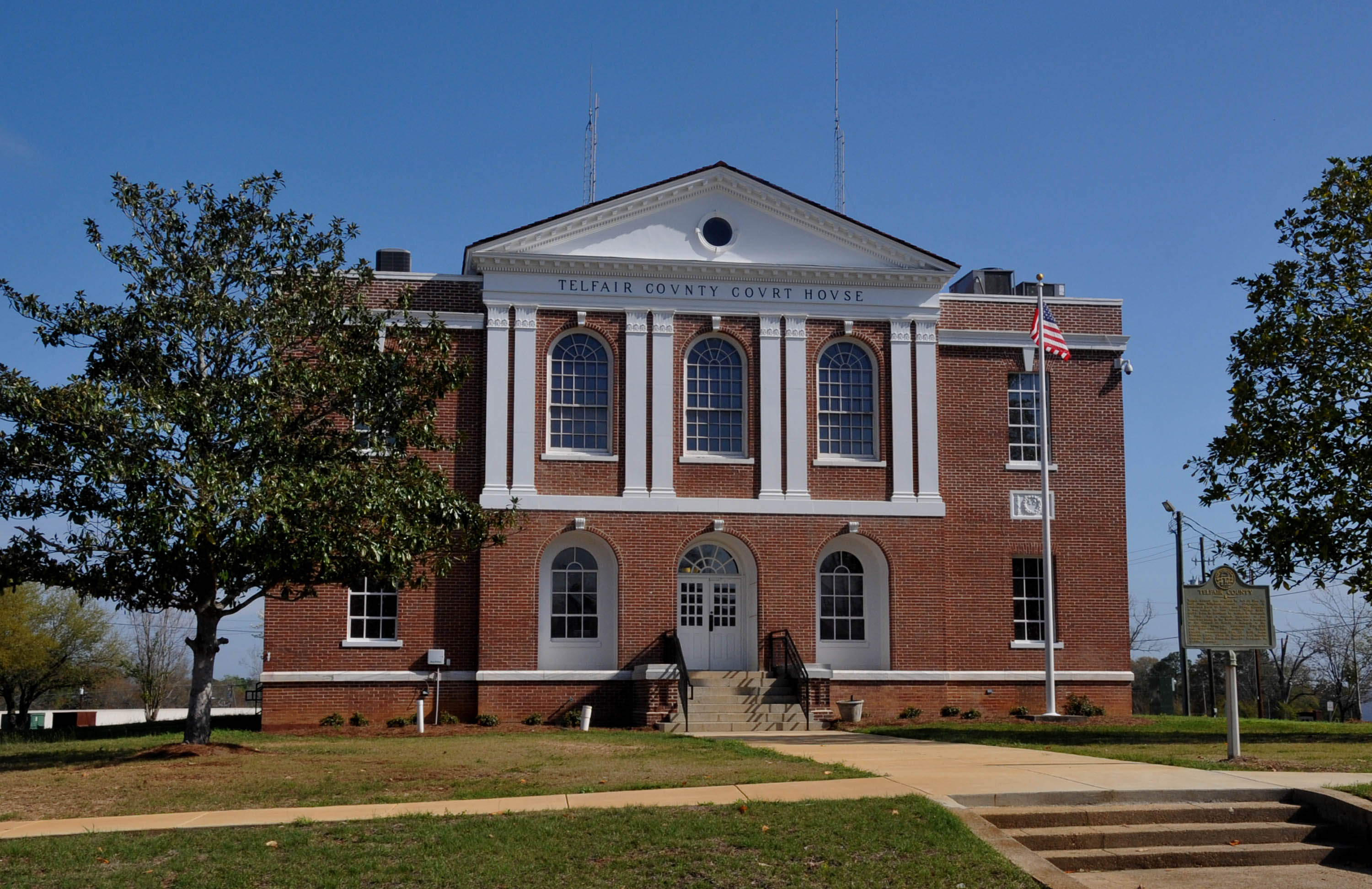
- Telfair County Courthouse in McRae-Helena

- Location within the U.S. state of Georgia
- Coordinates: 31°56′N 82°56′W
- Country: United States
- State: Georgia
- Founded: December 10, 1807; 218 years ago
- Named for: Edward Telfair
- Seat: McRae-Helena
- Largest city: McRae-Helena

Area
  - Total: 444 sq mi (1,150 km^{2})
  - Land: 437 sq mi (1,130 km^{2})
  - Water: 6.7 sq mi (17 km^{2}) 1.5%

Population (2020)
  - Total: 12,477
  - Estimate (2025): 11,195 ▼
  - Density: 29/sq mi (11/km^{2})
- Time zone: UTC−5 (Eastern)
  - Summer (DST): UTC−4 (EDT)
- Congressional district: 8th
- Website: telfaircounty.georgia.gov

Telfair County is a county located in the southern portion of the U.S. state of Georgia. As of the 2020 census, the population was 12,477. The largest city and county seat is McRae-Helena.

In 2009, researchers from the Fernbank Museum of Natural History announced having found artifacts they associated with the 1541 Hernando de Soto Expedition at a private site near the Ocmulgee River, the first such find between Tallahassee, Florida and western North Carolina. De Soto's expedition was well recorded, but researchers have had difficulties finding artifacts from sites where he stopped. This site was an indigenous village occupied by the historic Creek people from the early 15th century into the 16th century. It was located further southeast than de Soto's expedition was thought to go in Georgia.

== History ==
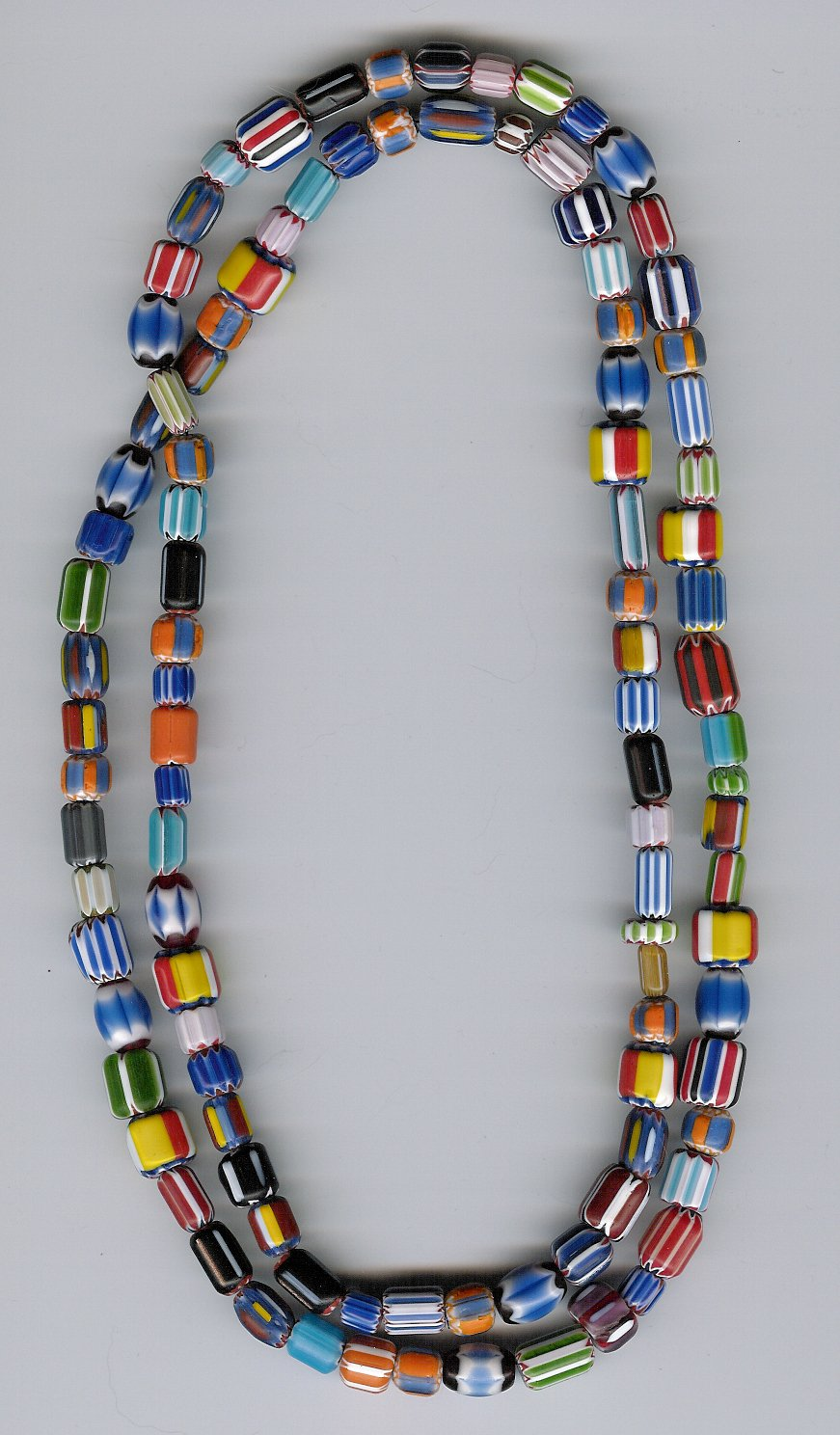
Modern example of chevron beads

Archaeologists associated with Atlanta's Fernbank Museum of Natural History have excavated a 2,000-acre (8.1 km^{2}) plot near McRae-Helena and approximately a mile from the Ocmulgee River, beginning in 2005. In 2009 they announced finding evidence of a Spanish settlement dating to the first half of the 16th century. The archaeologists originally believed that the artifacts may have come from a settlement founded by Spanish leader Lucas Vázquez de Ayllón from Hispaniola in 1526 and briefly occupied by hundreds of colonists. The group encountered hard conditions and fewer than 200 survived to return to Hispaniola.

Additional research suggests that the site instead was one visited in 1541 by the de Soto Expedition. Researchers have recovered Murano glass beads, made in Venice, Italy, and brought by the Spanish for trading with Native Americans; pottery fragments, and iron weapons. Some of the beads bear a chevron pattern. Such beads have been identified as a hallmark of the de Soto expedition, due to the limited period of time in which they were produced. Excavations have also produced six metal objects, including three iron tools and a silver pendant.

The site is further west than scholars had earlier believed that the de Soto expedition had traveled, based on documentation from his expedition. This was the first evidence found of his expedition between Tallahassee, Florida, where excavations have revealed artifacts of his expedition, and western North Carolina where another site has been found.

What we have now is the best-documented collection of Spanish artifacts in Georgia; many are unique, and they are the only examples of certain artifacts ever found outside Florida.

— Archaeologist Dennis Blanton, 2009

This site is believed to have been a Native American community, occupied from the end of the 15th century through the first decades of the 16th century. At that time, they had neither glass nor metal goods. Blanton presented a paper on his findings on November 5, 2009, at the Southeastern Archaeological Conference in Mobile, Alabama.

The historic Creek people occupied much of this area of Georgia. Telfair County was established by European Americans on December 10, 1807, as part of Georgia. Development of the county largely took place after Indian Removal in the 1830s of the Creek Confederacy, who had occupied a large territory, including the southern two thirds of present-day Georgia, for thousands of years. They were removed to Indian Territory west of the Mississippi River, in today's Oklahoma. The county is named for Edward Telfair, the sixteenth governor of Georgia and a member of the Continental Congress.

Many of the first European-American settlers were Scottish immigrants and Scots-Irish migrants who traveled down the backcountry from Pennsylvania and Virginia.

=== World Record Largemouth Bass ===
The world record largemouth according to the IGFA is shared by Manabu Kurita and George W. Perry. Kurita's bass was caught from Lake Biwa in Japan on July 2, 2009, and weighed 10.12 kilograms (22 lb 5 oz). Perry's bass was caught on June 2, 1932, from Montgomery Lake in Georgia and weighed 10.09 kilograms (22 lb 4 oz). Montgomery Lake is not a true lake but an oxbow off the Ocmulgee River in between Lumber City, Georgia and Jacksonville, Georgia.

== Geography ==
According to the U.S. Census Bureau, the county has a total area of 444 square miles (1,150 km^{2}), of which 437 square miles (1,130 km^{2}) is land and 6.7 square miles (17 km^{2}) (1.5%) is water. The county contains at least 50 artesian wells.

The southern two-thirds of Telfair County, bordered by a line from Milan east to Lumber City, are located in the Lower Ocmulgee River sub-basin of the Altamaha River basin. The northern portion of the county is located in the Little Ocmulgee River sub-basin of the same Altamaha River basin.

=== Major highways ===
- U.S. Route 23 / U.S. Route 341 / State Route 27
- U.S. Route 280 / State Route 30
- U.S. Route 319 / U.S. Route 441 / State Route 31
- State Route 19
- State Route 117
- State Route 132
- State Route 149
  - State Route 149 Connector
- State Route 165

=== Adjacent counties ===
- Wheeler County (northeast)
- Jeff Davis County (southeast)
- Coffee County (south)
- Ben Hill County (southwest)
- Wilcox County (west)
- Dodge County (northwest)

== Communities ==
=== Cities ===
- McRae-Helena (county seat)
- Jacksonville
- Lumber City
- Milan
- Scotland

=== Unincorporated communities ===
- China Hill
- Towns
- Workmore

== Demographics ==
Historical population
Census	Pop.	Note	%±
1810	744		—
1820	2,104		182.8%
1830	2,136		1.5%
1840	2,763		29.4%
1850	3,026		9.5%
1860	2,713		−10.3%
1870	3,245		19.6%
1880	4,828		48.8%
1890	5,477		13.4%
1900	10,083		84.1%
1910	13,288		31.8%
1920	15,291		15.1%
1930	14,997		−1.9%
1940	15,145		1.0%
1950	13,221		−12.7%
1960	11,715		−11.4%
1970	11,381		−2.9%
1980	11,445		0.6%
1990	11,000		−3.9%
2000	11,794		7.2%
2010	16,500		39.9%
2020	12,477		−24.4%
2025 (est.)	11,195	▼	−10.3%
U.S. Decennial Census; 1790-1880 1890-1910; 1920-1930 1930-1940; 1940-1950 1960-1980; 1980-2000 2010

=== Racial and ethnic composition ===
Telfair County, Georgia – Racial and ethnic composition Note: the US Census treats Hispanic/Latino as an ethnic category. This table excludes Latinos from the racial categories and assigns them to a separate category. Hispanics/Latinos may be of any race.
Race / Ethnicity (NH = Non-Hispanic)	Pop 1980	Pop 1990	Pop 2000	Pop 2010	Pop 2020	% 1980	% 1990	% 2000	% 2010	% 2020
White alone (NH)	7,828	7,190	6,993	8,429	5,970	68.40%	65.36%	59.29%	51.08%	47.85%
Black or African American alone (NH)	3,517	3,754	4,515	5,830	4,326	30.73%	34.13%	38.28%	35.33%	34.67%
Native American or Alaska Native alone (NH)	2	9	3	8	28	0.02%	0.08%	0.03%	0.05%	0.22%
Asian alone (NH)	13	6	23	90	30	0.11%	0.05%	0.20%	0.55%	0.24%
Native Hawaiian or Pacific Islander alone (NH)	x	x	0	4	0	x	x	0.00%	0.02%	0.00%
Other race alone (NH)	1	0	3	3	17	0.01%	0.00%	0.03%	0.02%	0.14%
Mixed race or Multiracial (NH)	x	x	42	110	178	x	x	0.36%	0.67%	1.43%
Hispanic or Latino (any race)	84	41	215	2,026	1,928	0.73%	0.37%	1.82%	12.28%	15.45%
Total	11,445	11,000	11,794	16,500	12,477	100.00%	100.00%	100.00%	100.00%	100.00%

=== 2020 census ===
As of the 2020 census, there were 12,477 people, 3,924 households, and 3,259 families residing in the county.

The median age was 40.0 years. 18.3% of residents were under the age of 18 and 15.8% of residents were 65 years of age or older. For every 100 females there were 148.2 males, and for every 100 females age 18 and over there were 160.9 males age 18 and over. 0.0% of residents lived in urban areas, while 100.0% lived in rural areas.

The racial makeup of the county was 58.3% White, 37.1% Black or African American, 0.3% American Indian and Alaska Native, 0.3% Asian, 0.0% Native Hawaiian and Pacific Islander, 1.7% from some other race, and 2.4% from two or more races. Hispanic or Latino residents of any race comprised 15.5% of the population.

Of those households, 30.3% had children under the age of 18 living with them and 34.2% had a female householder with no spouse or partner present. About 31.5% of all households were made up of individuals and 15.2% had someone living alone who was 65 years of age or older.

There were 4,704 housing units, of which 16.6% were vacant. Among occupied housing units, 67.5% were owner-occupied and 32.5% were renter-occupied. The homeowner vacancy rate was 1.7% and the rental vacancy rate was 7.6%.

== Politics ==
As of the 2020s, Telfair County is a strongly Republican voting county, voting 70% for Donald Trump in 2024. Telfair County had been a reliably Democratic county in its Solid South days, but later became a swing county for the rest of the 20th century. The last Democrat to win the county was Tennessean Al Gore in 2000, and the county has trended towards the GOP in more recent elections.

For elections to the United States House of Representatives, Telfair County is part of Georgia's 8th congressional district, currently represented by Austin Scott. For elections to the Georgia State Senate, Telfair County is part of District 19. For elections to the Georgia House of Representatives, Telfair County is part of districts 133 and 156.

United States presidential election results for Telfair County, Georgia
Year	Republican		Democratic		Third party(ies)	
Year	No.	%	No.	%	No.	%
1912	19	2.59%	694	94.68%	20	2.73%
1916	29	3.51%	773	93.47%	25	3.02%
1920	37	3.35%	1,069	96.65%	0	0.00%
1924	264	15.03%	1,382	78.66%	111	6.32%
1928	332	13.90%	2,057	86.10%	0	0.00%
1932	45	5.65%	746	93.60%	6	0.75%
1936	121	9.46%	1,158	90.54%	0	0.00%
1940	104	6.90%	1,391	92.24%	13	0.86%
1944	174	12.78%	1,187	87.22%	0	0.00%
1948	75	6.65%	712	63.18%	340	30.17%
1952	243	8.27%	2,695	91.73%	0	0.00%
1956	284	12.04%	2,075	87.96%	0	0.00%
1960	791	21.30%	2,922	78.70%	0	0.00%
1964	1,914	50.55%	1,872	49.45%	0	0.00%
1968	720	16.90%	1,038	24.37%	2,502	58.73%
1972	2,245	76.57%	687	23.43%	0	0.00%
1976	637	15.27%	3,534	84.73%	0	0.00%
1980	1,173	29.76%	2,700	68.51%	68	1.73%
1984	1,980	49.14%	2,049	50.86%	0	0.00%
1988	1,805	50.21%	1,765	49.10%	25	0.70%
1992	1,324	31.58%	2,238	53.39%	630	15.03%
1996	1,143	34.30%	1,856	55.70%	333	9.99%
2000	1,693	48.47%	1,777	50.87%	23	0.66%
2004	2,171	57.49%	1,590	42.11%	15	0.40%
2008	2,486	56.81%	1,862	42.55%	28	0.64%
2012	2,480	57.17%	1,805	41.61%	53	1.22%
2016	2,450	64.54%	1,313	34.59%	33	0.87%
2020	2,825	65.17%	1,488	34.33%	22	0.51%
2024	2,930	69.53%	1,274	30.23%	10	0.24%

United States Senate election results for Telfair County, Georgia2
Year	Republican		Democratic		Third party(ies)	
Year	No.	%	No.	%	No.	%
2020	2,751	64.65%	1,435	33.73%	69	1.62%
2020	2,497	64.94%	1,348	35.06%	0	0.00%

United States Senate election results for Telfair County, Georgia3
Year	Republican		Democratic		Third party(ies)	
Year	No.	%	No.	%	No.	%
2020	1,293	30.87%	1,003	23.94%	1,893	45.19%
2020	2,825	65.51%	1,487	34.49%	0	0.00%
2022	2,340	68.82%	1,032	30.35%	28	0.82%
2022	2,182	67.79%	1,037	32.21%	0	0.00%

Georgia Gubernatorial election results for Telfair County
Year	Republican		Democratic		Third party(ies)	
Year	No.	%	No.	%	No.	%
2022	2,433	71.29%	960	28.13%	20	0.59%

== Education ==
The Telfair County School District has three schools, including the Telfair County High School.

== Notable people ==
- Eugene Talmadge
- Herman Talmadge
- James E. Livingston
- Marion B. Folsom
- Kim Batten
- James McRae (United States Army officer)

== See also ==
- National Register of Historic Places listings in Telfair County, Georgia
- List of sites and peoples visited by the Hernando de Soto Expedition
- List of counties in Georgia
