= Glenwood, Georgia =

- City
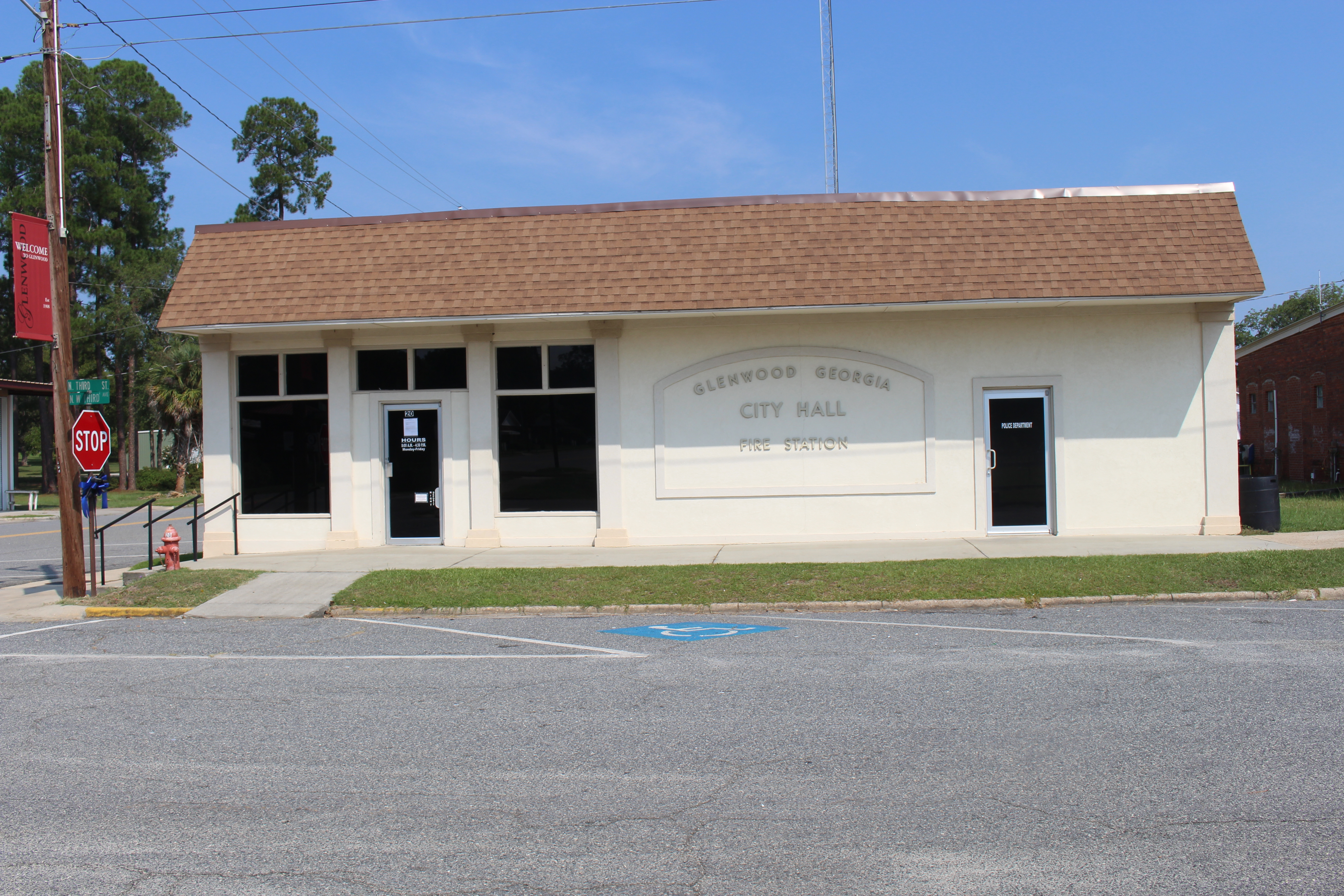
- City Hall in Glenwood

- Location in Wheeler County and the state of Georgia
- Coordinates: 32°10′52″N 82°40′22″W
- Country: United States
- State: Georgia
- County: Wheeler

Area
  - Total: 1.89 sq mi (4.89 km^{2})
  - Land: 1.86 sq mi (4.82 km^{2})
  - Water: 0.023 sq mi (0.06 km^{2})
- Elevation: 194 ft (59 m)

Population (2020)
  - Total: 850
  - Density: 456.6/sq mi (176.28/km^{2})
- Time zone: UTC-5 (Eastern (EST))
  - Summer (DST): UTC-4 (EDT)
- ZIP code: 30428
- Area code: 912
- FIPS code: 13-33392
- GNIS feature ID: 0314643

Glenwood is a city in Wheeler County, Georgia, United States. The population was 850 in 2020.

== Geography ==
Glenwood is located at 32°10′52″N 82°40′22″W (32.181165, -82.672806).

According to the United States Census Bureau, the city has a total area of 3.2 square miles (8.3 km^{2}), all land.

== Demographics ==
Historical population
Census	Pop.	Note	%±
1910	347		—
1920	592		70.6%
1930	569		−3.9%
1940	625		9.8%
1950	684		9.4%
1960	682		−0.3%
1970	670		−1.8%
1980	824		23.0%
1990	881		6.9%
2000	884		0.3%
2010	747		−15.5%
2020	850		13.8%
U.S. Decennial Census

=== Racial and ethnic composition ===
Glenwood city, Georgia – Racial and ethnic composition Note: the US Census treats Hispanic/Latino as an ethnic category. This table excludes Latinos from the racial categories and assigns them to a separate category. Hispanics/Latinos may be of any race.
Race / Ethnicity (NH = Non-Hispanic)	Pop 2000	Pop 2010	Pop 2020	% 2000	% 2010	% 2020
White alone (NH)	510	407	407	57.69%	54.48%	47.88%
Black or African American alone (NH)	338	302	400	38.24%	40.43%	47.06%
Native American or Alaska Native alone (NH)	2	4	1	0.23%	0.54%	0.12%
Asian alone (NH)	3	6	4	0.34%	0.80%	0.47%
Native Hawaiian or Pacific Islander alone (NH)	0	0	0	0.00%	0.00%	0.00%
Other race alone (NH)	0	0	1	0.00%	0.00%	0.12%
Mixed race or Multiracial (NH)	8	10	15	0.90%	1.34%	1.76%
Hispanic or Latino (any race)	23	18	22	2.60%	2.41%	2.59%
Total	884	747	850	100.00%	100.00%	100.00%

=== 2000 census ===
As of the census of 2000, there were 884 people, 354 households, and 210 families residing in the city. By 2020, its population declined to 850.
