= McRae, Georgia =

- City
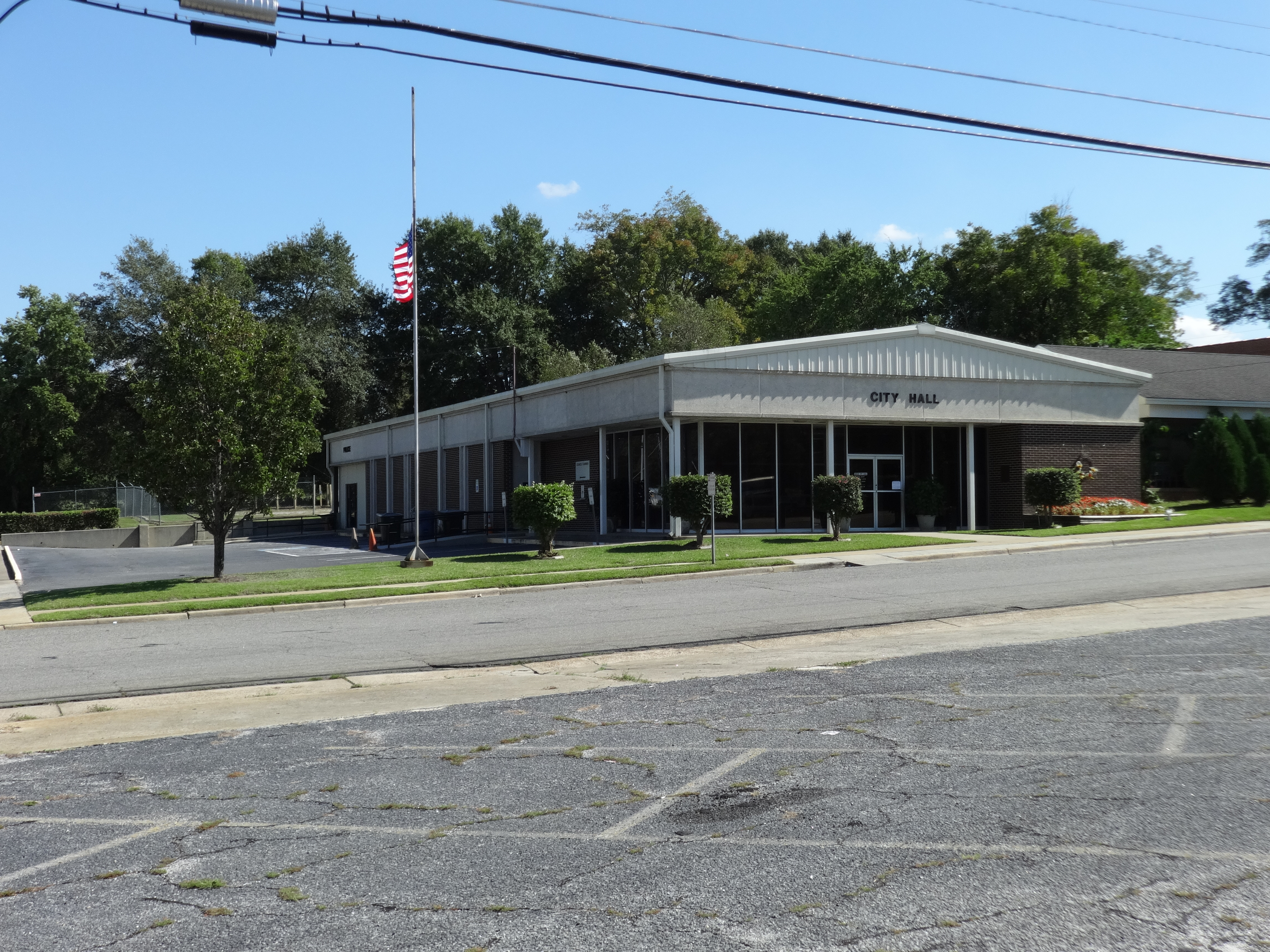
- McRae-Helena City Hall

- Location in Telfair County and the state of Georgia
- Coordinates: 32°3′52″N 82°53′54″W
- Country: United States
- State: Georgia
- County: Telfair

Area
  - Total: 4.4 sq mi (11.4 km^{2})
  - Land: 4.3 sq mi (11.2 km^{2})
  - Water: 0.077 sq mi (0.2 km^{2})
- Elevation: 246 ft (75 m)

Population (2010)
  - Total: 5,740
  - Density: 1,322/sq mi (510.4/km^{2})
- Time zone: UTC-5 (Eastern (EST))
  - Summer (DST): UTC-4 (EDT)
- ZIP code: 31055
- Area code: 229
- FIPS code: 13-49084
- GNIS feature ID: 0317973
- Website: mcrae-helena.org

McRae was a city in and the county seat of Telfair County, Georgia, United States. It was designated as the seat in 1871, after being established the previous year as a station on the Macon and Brunswick Railroad. Upon the city's merger with adjacent Helena in 2015, the new county seat is the combined city of McRae-Helena.

As of the 2010 census, McRae had a population of 5,740, up from 2,682 at the 2000 census, due largely to expansion of the city limits to incorporate the area and prison population of the McRae Correctional Institution, a privately owned and operated prison under contract to the federal government. The prison is a low-security facility holding adult males; it is owned and operated by CoreCivic.

== History ==
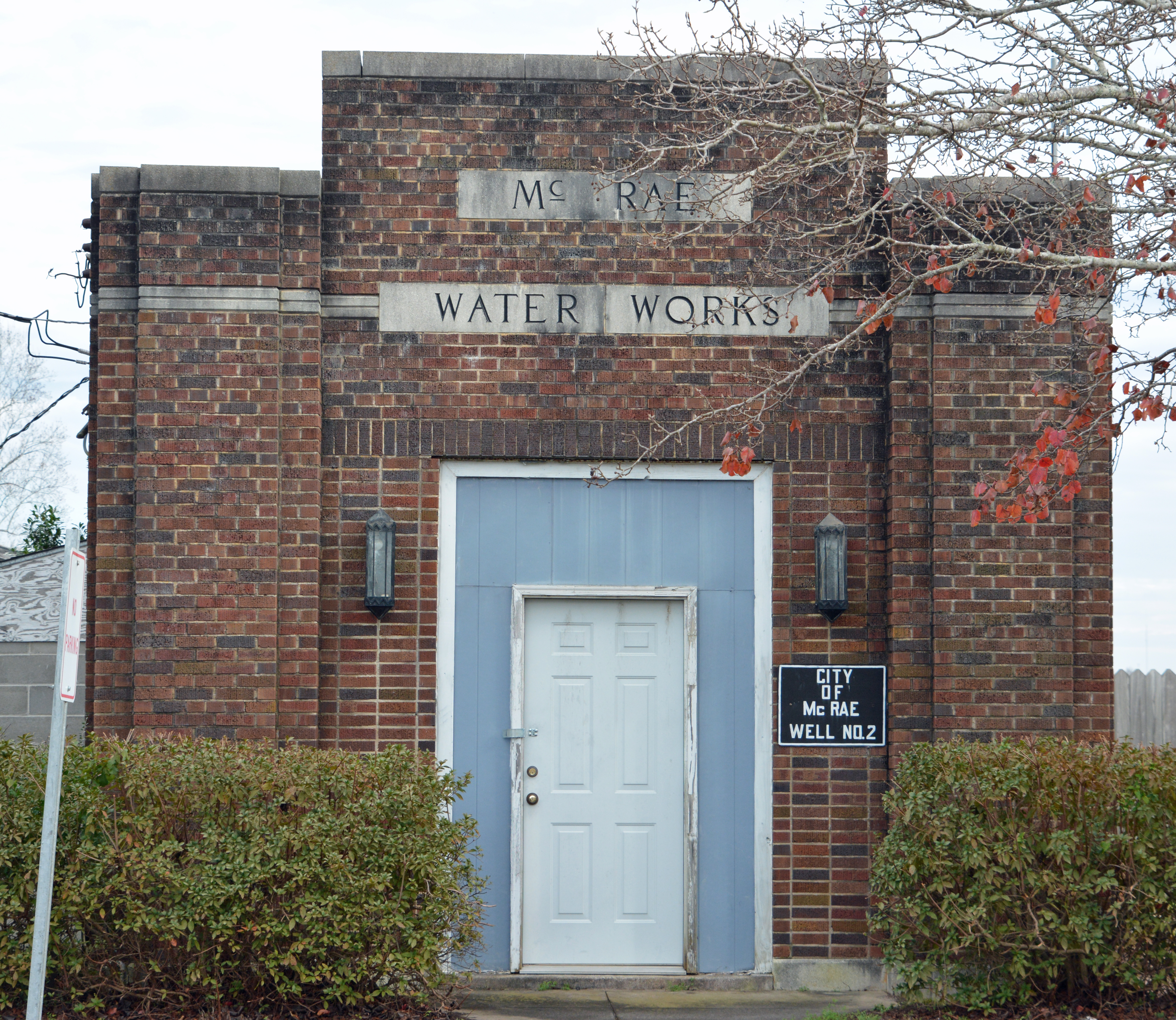
Old Water Works building

McRae was founded in 1870 as station number eleven on the Macon and Brunswick Railroad. In 1871, the seat of Telfair County was transferred to McRae from Jacksonville. McRae was incorporated on March 3, 1874, and was named for a pioneering Scottish family. The community was named after Daniel M. McRae, the original owner of the town site. During the antebellum years and after the Civil War, the county had an economy largely based on cotton plantations, and McRae was a trading center. McRae was incorporated as a city in 1902. During the racial violence of the Red Summer of 1919 one Berry Washington, an elderly black man, was arrested and put in the McRae jail after defending two girls from assault. On May 25 a large mob led by a Baptist minister conspired with a McRae deputy to seize Berry Washington from jail and lynch him over in Milan. The city has historic ties to foxhunting; it was home to Jacob "Jackie" Ryals and his champion American Foxhound, P & R Ginger Jo R, who in 1976 became the only hound to win both the United States Open and the National Field Trial Championship in the same calendar year.

McRae and Telfair County approved construction of a private prison in the early 21st century to hold federal prisoners, in the belief that it would provide jobs to local residents. McRae Correctional Facility, a low-security prison for adult males, has been owned and operated by CCA, the largest prison company in the United States in 2015, since it opened in 2003.

== Geography ==
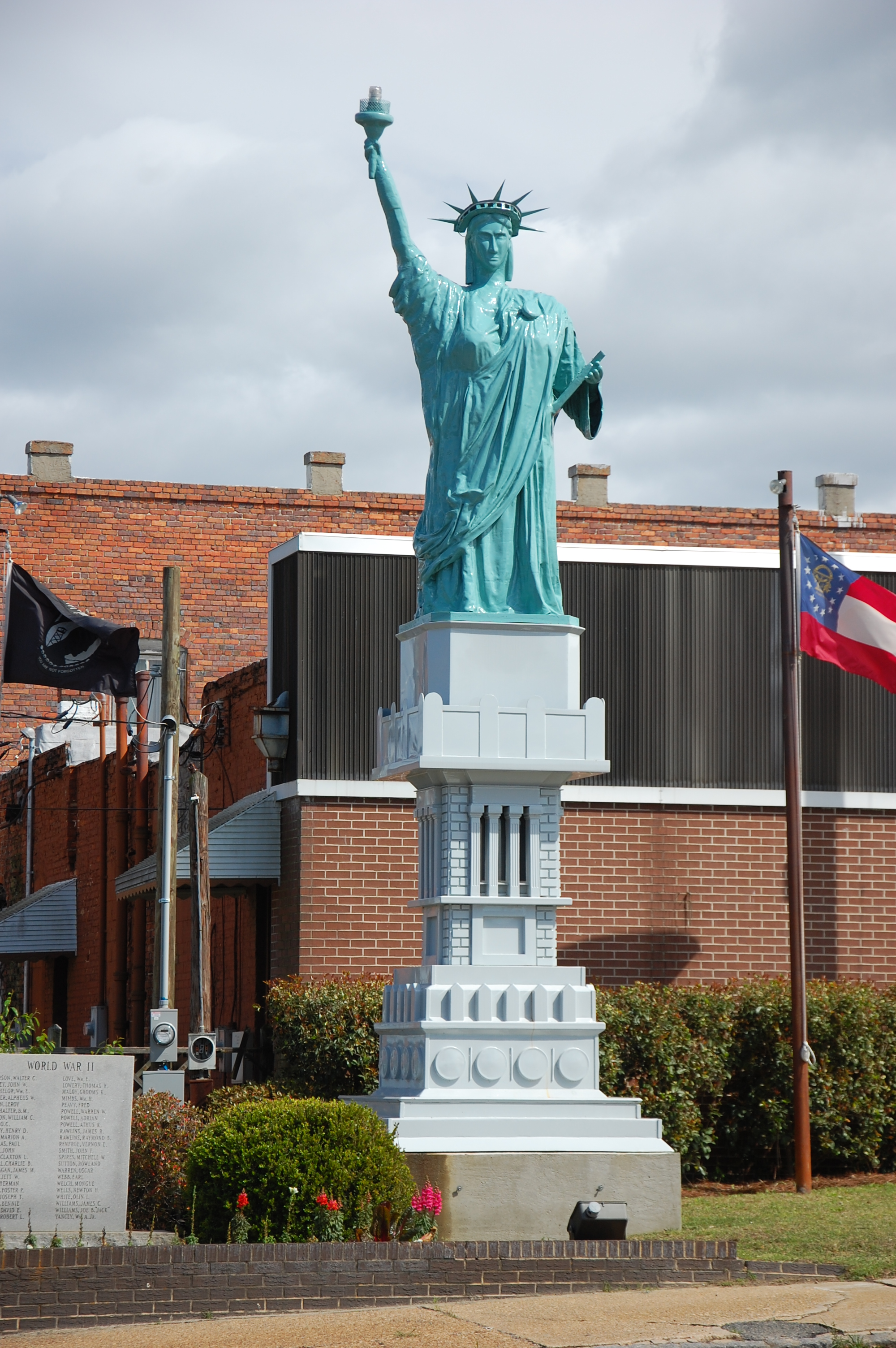
Liberty Square

McRae is located in northern Telfair County at 32°3′52″N 82°53′54″W (32.064508, -82.898251). Helena is to the northwest.

Several U.S. highways pass through McRae. U.S. Routes 23 and 341 pass through the city as Oak Street, leading northwest 20 miles (32 km) to Eastman and southeast 24 miles (39 km) to Hazlehurst, while U.S. Routes 280, 319, and 441 pass through as Third Avenue, crossing US 23/341 in the center of town. US 280 leads northeast 33 miles (53 km) to Vidalia and west 55 miles (89 km) to Cordele, while US 319/441 leads south 19 miles (31 km) to the small town of Jacksonville and north 35 miles (56 km) to Dublin.

According to the United States Census Bureau, the city has a total area of 4.4 square miles (11.4 km^{2}), of which 4.3 square miles (11.2 km^{2}) is land and 0.077 square miles (0.2 km^{2}), or 1.77%, is water. The Little Ocmulgee River flows just northeast of the city limits.

== Sites of interest ==
Located in downtown McRae is Liberty Square, home of a Statue of Liberty replica that is one-twelfth the size of the original. It has a replica of the Liberty Bell and a marble memorial to Telfair County residents who died in military service.

On the outskirts of McRae is the Talmadge Home. This historic home was occupied by two former Georgia governors, Eugene Talmadge and Herman Eugene Talmadge. McRae was also the birthplace of Marion B. Folsom (1893–1976), a longtime executive of the Eastman Kodak Company who served as the United States Secretary of Health, Education, and Welfare during the Eisenhower administration.

Famous railfan photographer William B. Folsom is buried in McRae. 1940–2008.

== Education ==
=== Telfair County School District ===
The Telfair County School District holds pre-school to grade twelve, and consists of one elementary school, a middle school, and a high school. The district has 112 full-time teachers and over 1,648 students.

- Telfair County Elementary School
- Telfair County Middle School
- Telfair County High School

== Demographics ==
Historical population
Census	Pop.	Note	%±
1900	1,020		—
1910	1,160		13.7%
1920	1,273		9.7%
1930	1,314		3.2%
1940	1,595		21.4%
1950	1,904		19.4%
1960	2,738		43.8%
1970	3,151		15.1%
1980	3,409		8.2%
1990	3,007		−11.8%
2000	2,682		−10.8%
2010	5,740		114.0%
2020	6,253		8.9%
U.S. Decennial Census

=== Racial and ethnic composition ===
McRae city, Georgia – Racial and ethnic composition Note: the US Census treats Hispanic/Latino as an ethnic category. This table excludes Latinos from the racial categories and assigns them to a separate category. Hispanics/Latinos may be of any race.
Race / Ethnicity (NH = Non-Hispanic)	Pop 2000	Pop 2010	% 2000	% 2010
White alone (NH)	1,477	1,885	55.07%	32.84%
Black or African American alone (NH)	1,144	2,129	42.65%	37.09%
Native American or Alaska Native alone (NH)	0	4	0.00%	0.07%
Asian alone (NH)	8	83	0.30%	1.45%
Native Hawaiian or Pacific Islander alone (NH)	0	4	0.00%	0.07%
Other race alone (NH)	0	3	0.00%	0.05%
Mixed race or Multiracial (NH)	11	48	0.41%	0.84%
Hispanic or Latino (any race)	42	1,584	1.57%	27.60%
Total	2,682	5,740	100.00%	100.00%

=== 2000 census ===
As of the census of 2000, there were 2,682 people, 1,057 households, and 714 families residing in the city. The population density was 796.7 inhabitants per square mile (307.6/km^{2}). There were 1,310 housing units at an average density of 389.1 per square mile (150.2/km^{2}). The racial makeup of the city was 55.48% White, 42.69% African American, 0.30% Asian, 1.12% from other races, and 0.41% from two or more races. Hispanic or Latino of any race were 1.57% of the population.

There were 1,057 households, out of which 30.7% had children under the age of 18 living with them, 43.1% were married couples living together, 19.7% had a female householder with no husband present, and 32.4% were non-families. 30.3% of all households were made up of individuals, and 15.9% had someone living alone who was 65 years of age or older. The average household size was 2.40 and the average family size was 2.94.

In the city, the population was spread out, with 24.0% under the age of 18, 8.2% from 18 to 24, 24.9% from 25 to 44, 22.1% from 45 to 64, and 20.9% who were 65 years of age or older. The median age was 40 years. For every 100 females, there were 81.3 males. For every 100 females age 18 and over, there were 75.0 males.

The median income for a household in the city was $27,236, and the median income for a family was $37,250. Males had a median income of $29,055 versus $20,321 for females. The per capita income for the city was $15,911. About 16.4% of families and 19.3% of the population were below the poverty line, including 23.4% of those under age 18 and 25.2% of those age 65 or over.

== Notable people ==
- Nick Wynne (born 1943) American historian

== See also ==
- Telfair County Courthouse and Jail
