= Lumber City, Georgia =

- City
- Location in Telfair County and the state of Georgia
- Coordinates: 31°55′48″N 82°41′1″W
- Country: United States
- State: Georgia
- County: Telfair

Area
  - Total: 1.94 sq mi (5.02 km^{2})
  - Land: 1.93 sq mi (4.99 km^{2})
  - Water: 0.012 sq mi (0.03 km^{2})
- Elevation: 138 ft (42 m)

Population (2020)
  - Total: 967
  - Density: 502/sq mi (193.9/km^{2})
- Time zone: UTC-5 (Eastern (EST))
  - Summer (DST): UTC-4 (EDT)
- ZIP code: 31549
- Area code: 912
- FIPS code: 13-47952
- GNIS feature ID: 0356372
- Website: https://lumbercityus.org/

Lumber City is a city located in Telfair County, Georgia, United States. As of the 2020 census, the city had a total population of 967.

== History ==
The Georgia General Assembly incorporated Lumber City as a town in 1889. The community was named for a sawmill near the original town site.

== Geography ==
Lumber City is located at 31°55'48" North, 82°41'1" West (31.930033, -82.683723).

U.S. Route 23/341 is the main route through the city, and leads northwest 17 mi (27 km) to McRae-Helena, the Telfair County seat, and southeast 7 mi (11 km) to Hazlehurst. Other highways that run through the city include Georgia State Routes 19 and 117.

According to the United States Census Bureau, the city has a total area of 1.9 square miles (5.0 km^{2}), all land.

It is located at the confluence of the Ocmulgee and Oconee rivers, which combine to form the Altamaha River.

== Demographics ==
Historical population
Census	Pop.	Note	%±
1890	471		—
1900	760		61.4%
1910	1,195		57.2%
1920	978		−18.2%
1930	1,043		6.6%
1940	1,044		0.1%
1950	1,232		18.0%
1960	1,360		10.4%
1970	1,377		1.3%
1980	1,426		3.6%
1990	1,429		0.2%
2000	1,247		−12.7%
2010	1,328		6.5%
2020	967		−27.2%
U.S. Decennial Census; 1850-1870 1870-1880; 1890-1910 1920-1930; 1940 1950 1960; 1970 1980 1990; 2000 2010 2020

=== Racial and ethnic composition ===
Lumber City, Georgia – Racial and ethnic composition Note: the US Census treats Hispanic/Latino as an ethnic category. This table excludes Latinos from the racial categories and assigns them to a separate category. Hispanics/Latinos may be of any race.
Race / Ethnicity (NH = Non-Hispanic)	Pop 2000	Pop 2010	Pop 2020	% 2000	% 2010	% 2020
White alone (NH)	580	632	413	46.51%	47.59%	42.71%
Black or African American alone (NH)	628	677	507	50.36%	50.98%	52.43%
Native American or Alaska Native alone (NH)	1	1	2	0.08%	0.08%	0.21%
Asian alone (NH)	0	0	1	0.00%	0.00%	0.10%
Native Hawaiian or Pacific Islander alone (NH)	0	0	0	0.00%	0.00%	0.00%
Other race alone (NH)	3	0	3	0.24%	0.00%	0.31%
Mixed race or Multiracial (NH)	2	4	22	0.16%	0.30%	2.28%
Hispanic or Latino (any race)	33	14	19	2.65%	1.05%	1.96%
Total	1,247	1,328	967	100.00%	100.00%	100.00%

=== 2020 census ===
As of the 2020 United States census, there were 967 people, 494 households, and 268 families residing in the city.
