= National Register of Historic Places listings in Pulaski County, Georgia =

This is a list of properties and districts in Pulaski County, Georgia that are listed on the National Register of Historic Places (NRHP).

This National Park Service list is complete through NPS recent listings posted March 21, 2025.

== Current listings ==
	Name on the Register	Image	Date listed	Location	City or town	Description
1	Hawkinsville City Hall-Auditorium	Hawkinsville City Hall-Auditorium	March 1, 1973 (#73000638)	Lumpkin and Broad Sts. 32°16′56″N 83°28′08″W	Hawkinsville	Built in 1907, now The Opera House
2	Hawkinsville Commercial and Industrial Historic District	Hawkinsville Commercial and Industrial Historic District	December 13, 2004 (#04001349)	Roughly bounded by Dooly, Broad, Houston, and 3rd Sts. 32°17′04″N 83°28′01″W	Hawkinsville	
3	Hawkinsville Public School	Hawkinsville Public School	May 28, 2008 (#08000492)	215 Warren St. 32°16′43″N 83°28′25″W	Hawkinsville	1936 (expanded in 1968)
4	Merritt-Ragan House	Merritt-Ragan House	August 29, 1991 (#91001156)	15 Merritt St. 32°16′44″N 83°28′04″W	Hawkinsville	
5	Pulaski County Courthouse	Pulaski County Courthouse	September 18, 1980 (#80001224)	Courthouse Sq. 32°16′59″N 83°28′08″W	Hawkinsville	Built in 1874, is a contributing property to the Hawkinsville Commercial and Industrial Historic District
6	St. Thomas African Methodist Episcopal Church	St. Thomas African Methodist Episcopal Church	December 7, 2000 (#00001477)	401 N. Dooly St. 32°17′11″N 83°28′15″W	Hawkinsville	Built 1908-12
7	Taylor Hall	Taylor Hall	November 17, 1978 (#78001000)	504 Kibbee St. (55 Kibbee according to Chamber of Commerce publication); 32°16′32″N 83°28′18″W	Hawkinsville	Built in 1825, is down a private drive with no view from public property
8	R. J. Taylor Memorial Hospital		September 17, 2021 (#100006907)	161 Commerce St. 32°17′01″N 83°28′20″W	Hawkinsville	
