= Hawkinsville (disambiguation) =

Hawkinsville is a city in and county seat of Pulaski County, Georgia, United States.

Hawkinsville may also refer to:

== Places ==
- Hawkinsville, California, USA, an unincorporated community in Siskiyou County
- Hawkinsville, New York, USA, a hamlet in Oneida County
- Hawkinsville, Tennessee, USA, an unincorporated community in Dyer County
- Hawkinsville, Texas, USA, a ghost town

== Other uses ==
- City of Hawkinsville (shipwreck)
- Hawkinsville and Florida Southern Railway
- Hawkinsville Commercial and Industrial Historic District
- Hawkinsville Opera House
- Hawkinsville Public School
- Taylor Hall (Hawkinsville, Georgia)
