= Grand Opera House (Macon, Georgia) =

Historic opera house in Macon, Georgia, US

- U.S. National Register of Historic Places
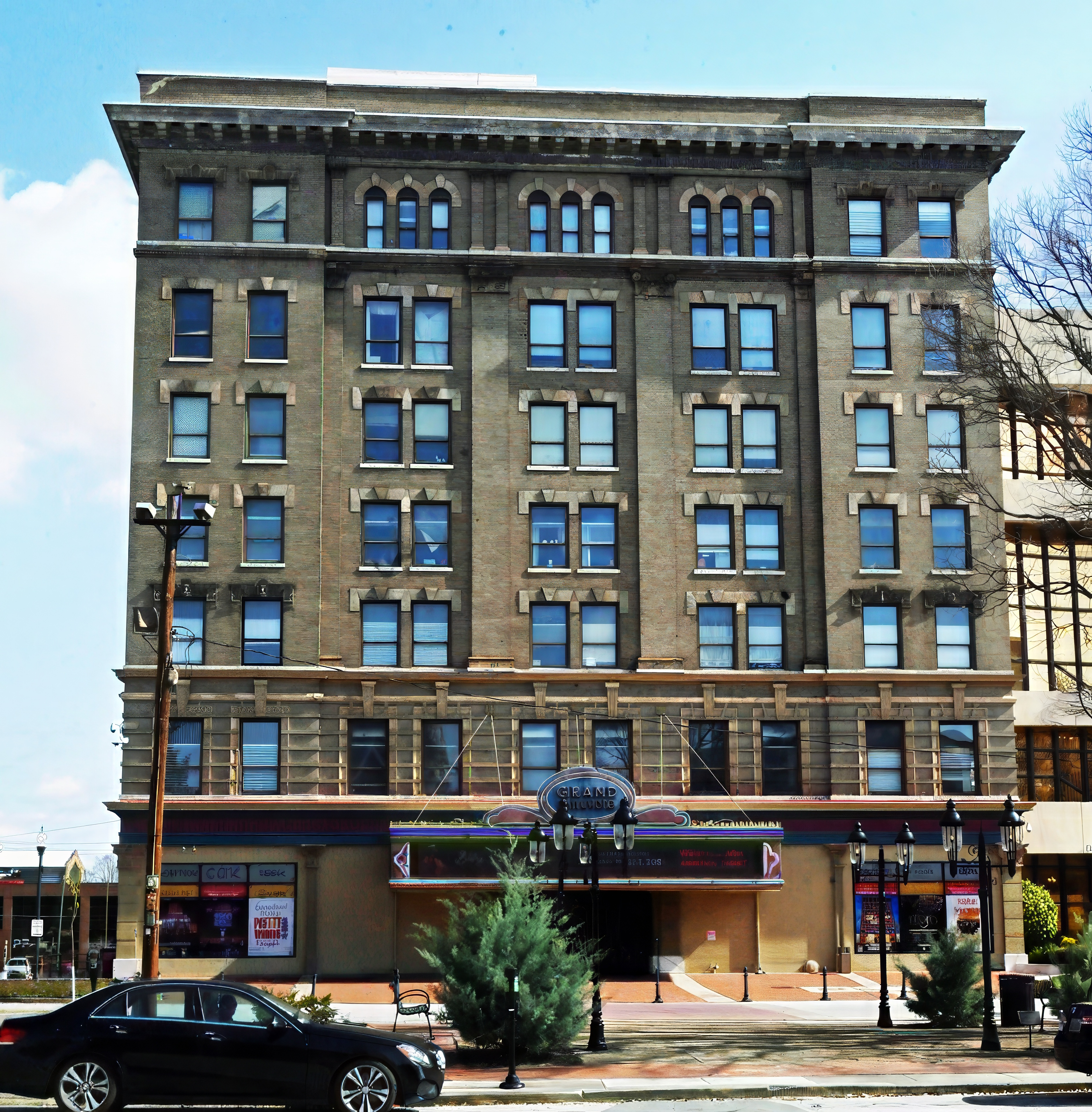

- Location within Georgia Location within the United States
- Location: 651 Mulberry St., Macon, Georgia; United States
- Coordinates: 32.83884°N 83.62821°W
- Built: 1884
- Architect: Alexander Blair; W.R. Gunn
- Architectural style: Gothic
- NRHP reference No.: 70000196
- Added to NRHP: June 22, 1970

The Grand Opera House, often called The Grand and originally known as the Academy of Music, is a historic opera house located in Macon, Georgia, United States. Listed on the National Register of Historic Places in 1970, it is now the performing arts center of Mercer University.

== History ==
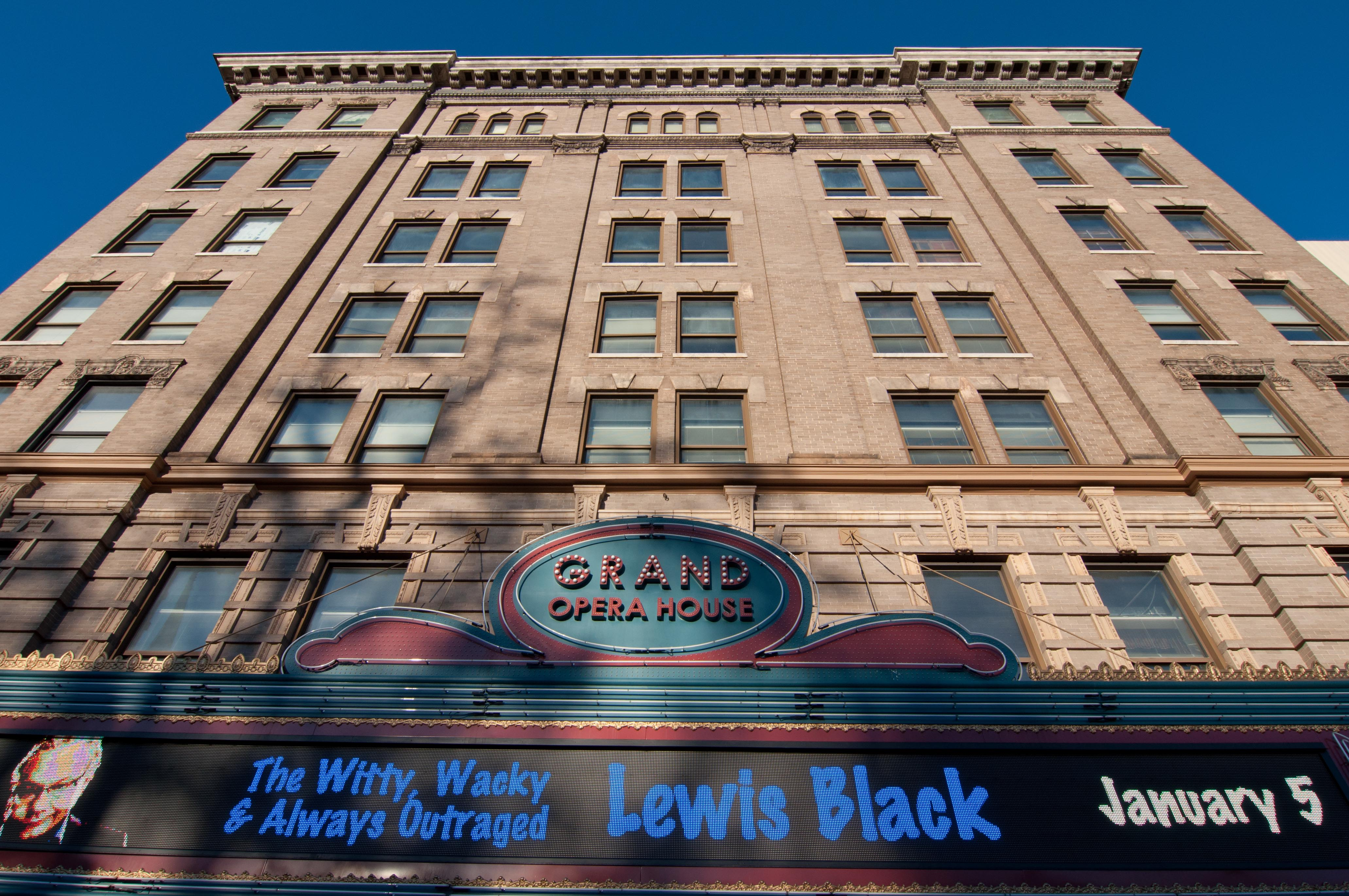

The Academy of Music was constructed in 1884 with the largest stage in the southeastern United States and seating for 2,418, almost one-fifth of Macon's population at the time. The building was renovated in 1905; the present seven-story facade was added and the building reopened as the Grand Opera House.

The Grand has had numerous historic uses; live horses and chariots appeared in a 1908 production of Ben-Hur and during World War I, actor Charlie Chaplin led the John Philip Sousa band for a fundraising effort. The theater has also hosted, among others, Sarah Bernhardt, Will Rogers, George Burns and Gracie Allen, Lionel Barrymore, Ethel Barrymore, Bob Hope, the Allman Brothers Band, and Ray Charles. The Allman Brothers Band, Wet Willie and The Marshall Tucker Band appeared at The Grand on an October 1973 episode of Don Kirshner's Rock Concert entitled "Saturday Night In Macon."

Magician Harry Houdini was also a featured player at the Grand, leaving a well-known legacy: the stage sports a number of trap doors, one of which remains operational and is used occasionally today in performances such as annual production of The Nutcracker ballet. Local lore claims that the trap doors were installed specifically for Houdini.

In 1936, as the popularity of vaudeville waned, the Grand changed to a movie theater, hosting Macon's only Hollywood premiere, 1945's God is My Co-Pilot.

== Revival ==
By the 1960s, the Grand had ceased showing movies and plans were made to replace it with a parking lot. Those plans were blocked in 1967 by the Macon Arts Council, a group formed to save and restore the Grand; the group held a fundraising gala featuring the Atlanta Symphony Orchestra and had the property placed on the National Register of Historic Places in 1970. Among the founders of the group was Macon architect Ellamae Ellis League who also supervised a restoration of The Grand so it could reopen as a live theater in 1969. (The second balcony, or peanut gallery, remained closed to the public and was dedicated to lighting equipment at this time, reducing the maximum seating to its current number of 1,030). Fund-raising efforts continued through the next several decades, with ongoing physical plant upgrades, with another renovation taking place in 1985.

In 1995, Mercer University signed a lease with Bibb County to manage the Grand. Subsequently, Mercer has invested in upgrading the facility to modern standards as well as making it a fixture for community events. Today, the Grand hosts many Broadway touring companies, concerts (such as those of the Macon Symphony Orchestra), community theatre productions (including the aforementioned Nutcracker holiday show), and other performances and events.
