= Pulaski County School District =

School district in Georgia (U.S. state)

Address
- 72 Warren Street Hawkinsville, Georgia, 31036-4700; United States
- Coordinates: 32.289962°N 83.473177°W

District information
- Grades: Pre-school - 12
- Superintendent: Debra R. Puckett
- Accreditation(s): Southern Association of Colleges and Schools; Georgia Accrediting Commission

Students and staff
- Enrollment: 1,632
- Faculty: 122

Other information
- Telephone: (478) 783-7200
- Website: www.pulaskicountyschools.org

The Pulaski County School District is a public school district in Pulaski County, Georgia, United States, based in Hawkinsville. It serves the communities of Hartford and Hawkinsville.

== Schools ==
The Pulaski County School District has one consolidated school consisting of an elementary, middle, and high school.

- Pulaski County Elementary School
- Pulaski County Middle School
- Hawkinsville High School
