= Eva C. Mitchell =

American educator

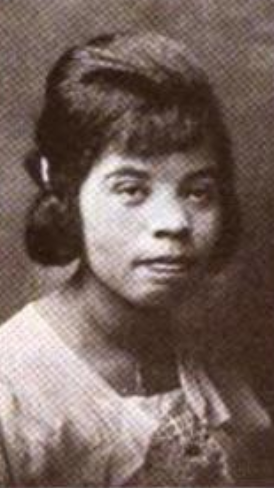
- Eva C. Mitchell, from a 1928 publication
- Born: August 21, 1893; Hawkinsville, Georgia
- Died: February 9, 1990 (age 96); Hampton, Virginia
- Occupation: Educator

Eva C. Mitchell (August 21, 1893 – February 9, 1990) was an American educator. She was a professor of education at Hampton Institute from 1930 to 1960.

== Early life and education ==
Mitchell was born in Hawkinsville, Georgia, the daughter of William Mitchell and Sarah Love Mitchell. She graduated from Hampton Institute in 1921. She earned a master's degree from Teachers College, Columbia University in 1930, and completed doctoral studies there in 1942.

== Career ==
Mitchell taught at the Penn School in South Carolina after college, then at the North Carolina state normal school in Fayetteville. She was a professor in the education department at Hampton Institute for thirty years, from 1930 to 1960, and was chair of the elementary education program there. Mitchell took a particular interest in providing continuing education opportunities for Black teachers, because, in the Jim Crow South, Black teachers were often prevented from attending the conferences and using the libraries that white teachers could access.

In 1933, Mitchell was elected president of the Virginia Society for Research, a scholarly society for Black academics in the state. She was research editor of the Virginia Education Bulletin from 1934 to 1940. After World War II, she worked on adult literacy, adult health education, and other reforms, and was a member of the board of directors of American Overseas Aid–United Nations Appeal for Children (AOA–UNAC). She was active in the National Association of Teachers in Colored Schools, the American Association of University Women (AAUW), and the NAACP.

== Publications ==
- "Educational Needs of Negroes, Illustrated" (1925)
- "The Necessity of a Guidance Program for Virginia Negro Teachers" (1935)
- "A Statistical Survey of Problems Facing the Negro Teacher in Virginia" (1936)
- "Adult Health Education and Recreational Programs: National, State, and Local" (1945)

== Legacy ==
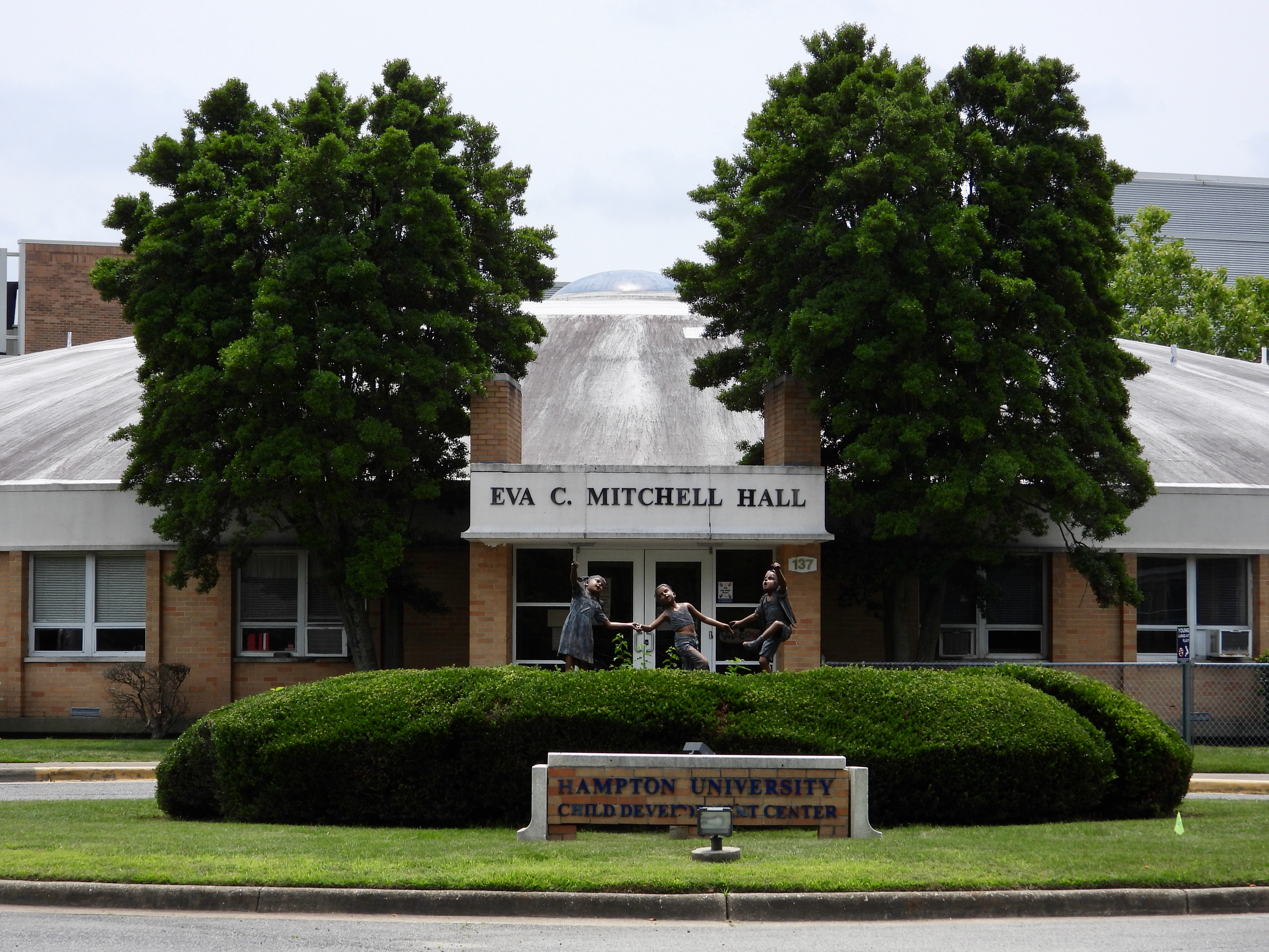
Eva C. Mitchell Hall, which houses the Child Development Center at Hampton University

Mitchell died in 1990, at the age of 96, in Hampton, Virginia. The Eva C. Mitchell Building at Hampton University was named in her honor in 1978, and houses the university's Child Development Center. The Hampton alumni chapter of Delta Sigma Theta has a scholarship named for Mitchell.
