= American Teachers Association =

Former professional organization in the United States

- Predecessor: National Colored Teachers Association (1906–1907); National Association of Teachers in Colored Schools (1907–1937)
- Merged into: National Education Association
- Formation: 1937
- Merger of: 1966
- Type: Professional association Union

The American Teachers Association (1937–1966), formerly National Colored Teachers Association (1906–1907) and National Association of Teachers in Colored Schools (1907–1937), was a professional association and teachers' union representing teachers in schools in the South for African Americans during the period of legal racial segregation in the United States. In 1954 the United States Supreme Court ruled in Brown v. Board of Education that segregation of public schools was unconstitutional. The Civil Rights Act of 1964 ended legal segregation.

== History ==
In 1906, at a meeting of the Negro Young Peoples Christian and Educational Congress, the National Colored Teachers Association was formed. In 1907, to reflect that many white teachers also worked in colored schools, the name was changed to the National Association of Teachers in Colored Schools (NATCS). The members were dealing with segregated schools in the South, which had been established in law. Additional racial segregation and Jim Crow laws had been imposed by white-dominated legislatures in the late 19th century. In addition, blacks had been disfranchised since the turn of the 20th century by provisions of new constitutions and laws in the South. With blacks closed out of the political process, educators found that black public schools in the segregated states were historically underfunded, and their teachers were paid less than white teachers in white schools.

In 1915, Hannah Pierce Lowe became the first woman and first African-American woman to earn a certificate by the organization.

1923 was a pivotal year for the organization. Mary McLeod Bethune became its first female president and it published its first edition of The Bulletin, the official magazine. The magazine "was a bridge between the members of the Association, and it served to inform the public and interpret NATCS to those who did not attend the annual meetings".

The 1927 president was William J. Hale, the first president of Tennessee State University, a historically black university in Nashville, Tennessee.

In 1937, members changed the name to the American Teachers Association (ATA). The ATA worked jointly with the National Education Association (NEA) on issues related to African-American education.

In 1926, an informal NEA committee was appointed to study issues in schools serving Black students. That began a period of cooperation between the two associations. Following the United States Supreme Court ruling in Brown v. Board of Education (1954) that segregated schools were unconstitutional, public schools were gradually integrated after massive resistance. The Civil Rights Act of 1964 prohibited legal segregation of public facilities.

The ATA and NEA began to consider a merger in the early 1960s, as a result of changes in education and the civil rights movement. In 1963, the ATA voted a "qualified recommendation" in favor of merger, which was completed in 1966. The name of the merged association remained the National Education Association.

== Purpose ==
The ATA did not support collective bargaining for its members. Instead, they sought to improve the status of education for African Americans in the South by:

- Improving teaching methods.
- Urging legislation for the improvement of schools.
- Collecting and publishing data covering the material contributions that Negroes were making toward their own education.
- Building more and better school houses, through fund-raising efforts. (Among these in the 1930s were schools built with the help of the Rosenwald Fund and monies raised by local black communities)
- Supplementing teacher's income and pushing for an extended school year.
- Co-operating with local public school boards.
- Broadening the Association's scope to include private and religious schools.

== Notable Members ==
- C. Louise Boehringer, Secretary of the Arizona State Teachers Association, 1919
- Eva C. Mitchell, education professor at Hampton Institute from 1930 to 1960
