= Perkins Opera House =

Historic theatre in Monticello, Florida, US

- U.S. National Register of Historic Places
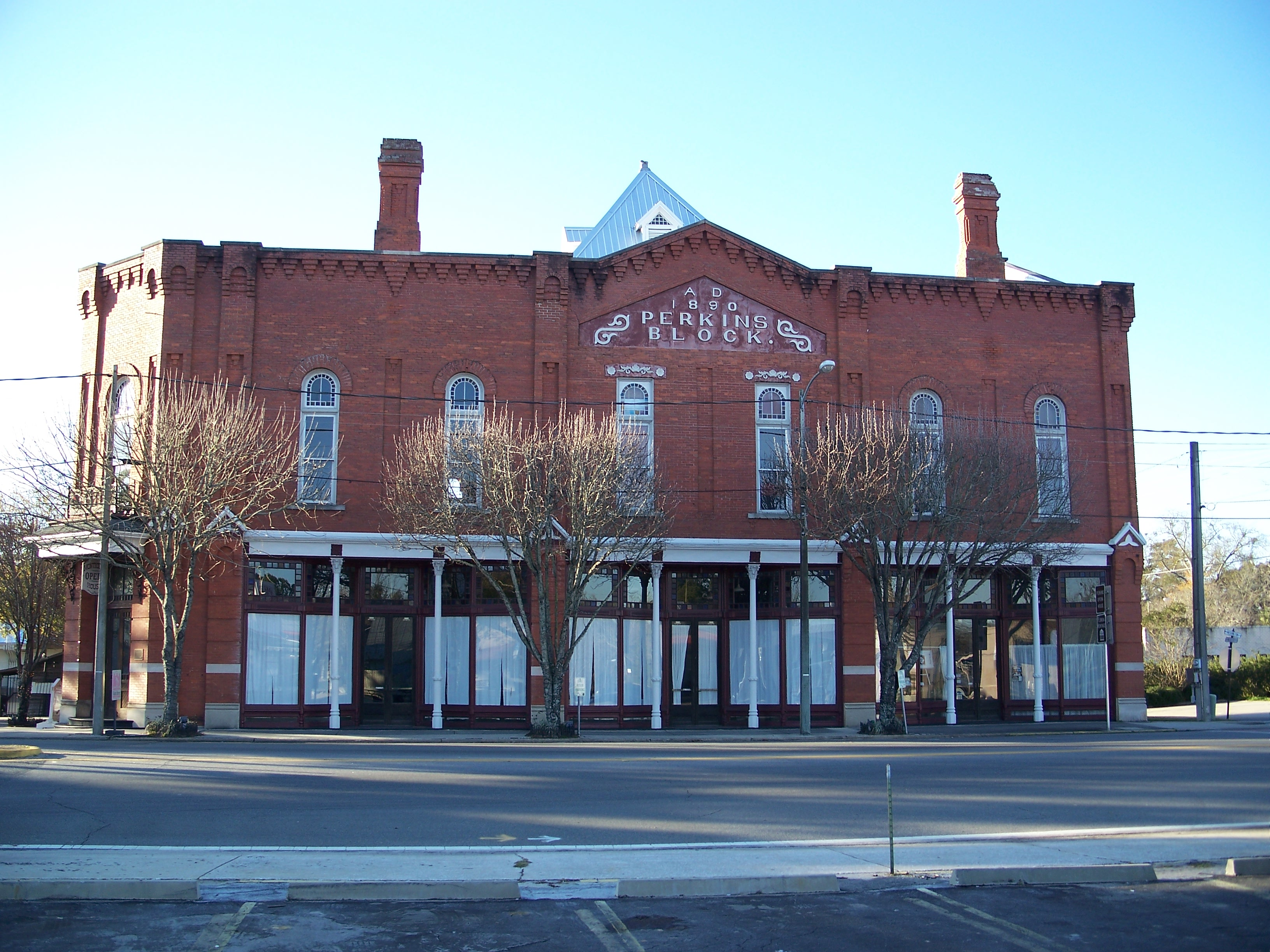
- Location: 185 W Washington St; Monticello, Florida
- Coordinates: 30°32′41″N 83°52′15″W
- Built: 1890
- Architect: W.R. Gunn
- Architectural style: Masonry Vernacular with Romanesque Revival elements
- NRHP reference No.: 72000330
- Added to NRHP: September 14, 1972

The Perkins Opera House (also known as the Monticello Opera House) is a historic theater in Monticello, Florida, United States. It is located at the corner of Washington Street and Jefferson Street.

== History ==
The Perkins Block Building was named after Monticello businessman John H. Perkins. As new railroads brought travelers through Monticello, the town hoped to build hotels and cultural attractions that would profit from the new tourist industry. Perkins was given a ten-year tax break on the condition that he funded a building that could house storefronts and a theater. An architect from Chattanooga, W. R. Gunn, was hired to build the structure, and completed the opera house in 1890.

The building included three first floor bays housing Perkins' mercantile interests - a general store and sewing machine shop, a hardware store and a farm implement supply store. In addition, Perkins built a stable behind the building from which horses, mules and wagons were sold. The second floor of the Perkins Block included a large foyer and an opera house boasting unparalleled acoustics and the largest stage in the region.

Perkins had hopes of establishing the opera house as a major theater in the South. For several years, performances included both professional touring groups and local vaudeville productions, such as The Mikado and She Stoops to Conquer. Shortly after the turn of the century, however, the railroads were re-routed, by-passing Monticello. The wealthy patrons who had once wintered in south Georgia and north Florida sought destinations further south in Florida, and the opera house faced financial disaster.

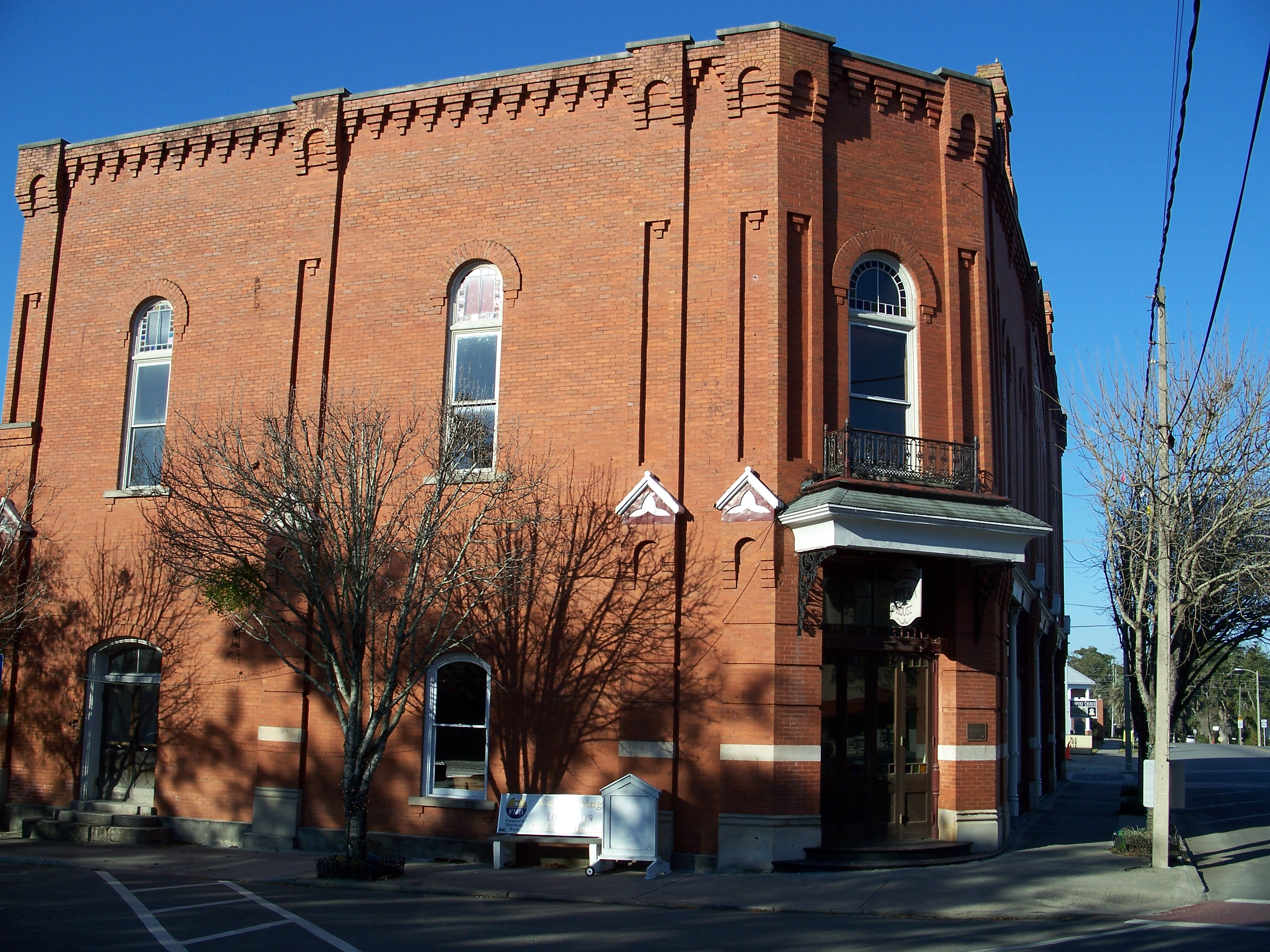
The Perkins Opera House, seen from the east side

Unable to attract the once-popular theatre productions, Perkins discontinued live performances. One of the final productions at the theater featured future Governor of Florida LeRoy Collins. A failed attempt to utilize the building as a movie theater led to the abandonment of the auditorium. Although the downstairs bays saw continuous occupation for a variety of uses, the opera house stood idle and soon fell into disrepair.

In 1972, the vision of a handful of interested people saved the opera house, with its falling plaster and leaking roof, from the destruction of the wrecker's ball. An organization was formed to provide opportunities for young performers and restore the opera house.

The Monticello Opera Company was formed in March of that year and performed at the first fund-raising event at the home of Mr. and Mrs. John H. Phipps.

The purchase of the Perkins Block was consummated on October 17, 1973. On that date, the Monticello Opera House, Inc. purchased the building with money raised through fund-raising efforts, a grant from the State of Florida and a private donation from Mrs. Dorothy Simpson, who held one-half interest in the building.

Maintenance and restoration of the facility continues to this day. In a joint effort with the Florida Department of State, Division of Historic Resources, a restoration project was completed in the area of the original stairway leading to the auditorium balcony. The construction brought the facility into compliance with fire code regulations to allow the lawful use of seating in the balcony. The project was completed with a sensitivity to the original architectural features and makes use of original molding and wainscoting wherever possible. Although the original seating in the balcony remained intact, the seats on the main level of the theater had to be replaced. The current seating was donated by Tallahassee Community College President during the school's renovation of its theater. Installation of the "new" seats was accomplished entirely with volunteer labor from members of the community.

Although the downstairs had been remodeled to accommodate those with disabilities, it was not until May 2004, that the theater became accessible. In 1999 $25,000 was donated in the memory of Dr. Gerald M. Cathey to institute fund raising efforts for installation of an elevator. An additional $25,000 was raised over the course of the next two years through donations from benefactors and production proceeds from the Opera House Stage Company. A $50,000 matching grant from the Department of State, Division of Historical Resources resulted in the hiring of Riley Palmer Construction to complete this long desired renovation.

== Present usage ==
The Monticello Opera House is used for a variety of events including children's theater, murder mystery dinners and large musicals. The patio and gazebo in the back host weddings and receptions.
