= St. Thomas African Methodist Episcopal Church =

- U.S. National Register of Historic Places
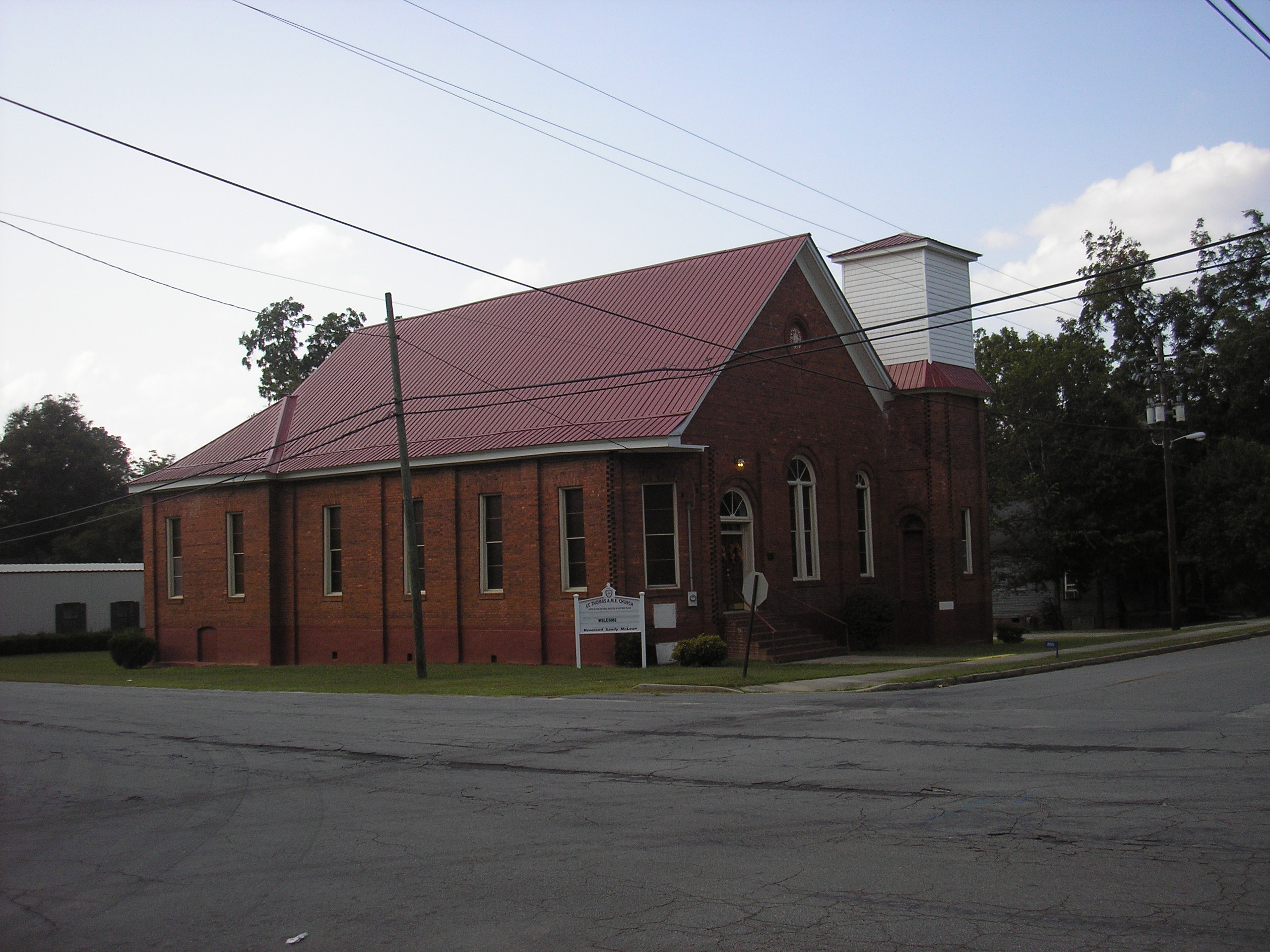

- Location within Georgia
- Location: 401 N. Dooly St., Hawkinsville, Georgia
- Coordinates: 32.28625°N 83.47082°W
- Area: 0.4 acres (0.16 ha)
- Built: 1908
- Architectural style: Folk Victorian
- NRHP reference No.: 00001477
- Added to NRHP: December 7, 2000

St. Thomas African Methodist Episcopal Church is a historic African-American church in Hawkinsville, Georgia, located at 401 North Dooly Street. It is a large brick building on the northwest corner of North Dooly Street and Second Street, built 1908-1912, replacing a wood building built in 1877. Some of its historical integrity was lost due to non-historic additions and alterations. Restrooms were added in the 1950s, ceiling tiles in the 1960s, carpeting in 1982, interior partitions and new windows in 1987, new steps in 1988, and new pews and air conditioning in 1989. It has a steeply pitched gable-front roof. The interior has an open space with a pulpit, with three sections of pews. It is one of the last remaining buildings of a historically African-American neighborhood and was the largest and only brick building in the neighborhood.

It was added to the National Register of Historic Places on December 7, 2000.

== See also ==
- National Register of Historic Places listings in Pulaski County, Georgia
