= W.R. Gunn =

American theatre architect

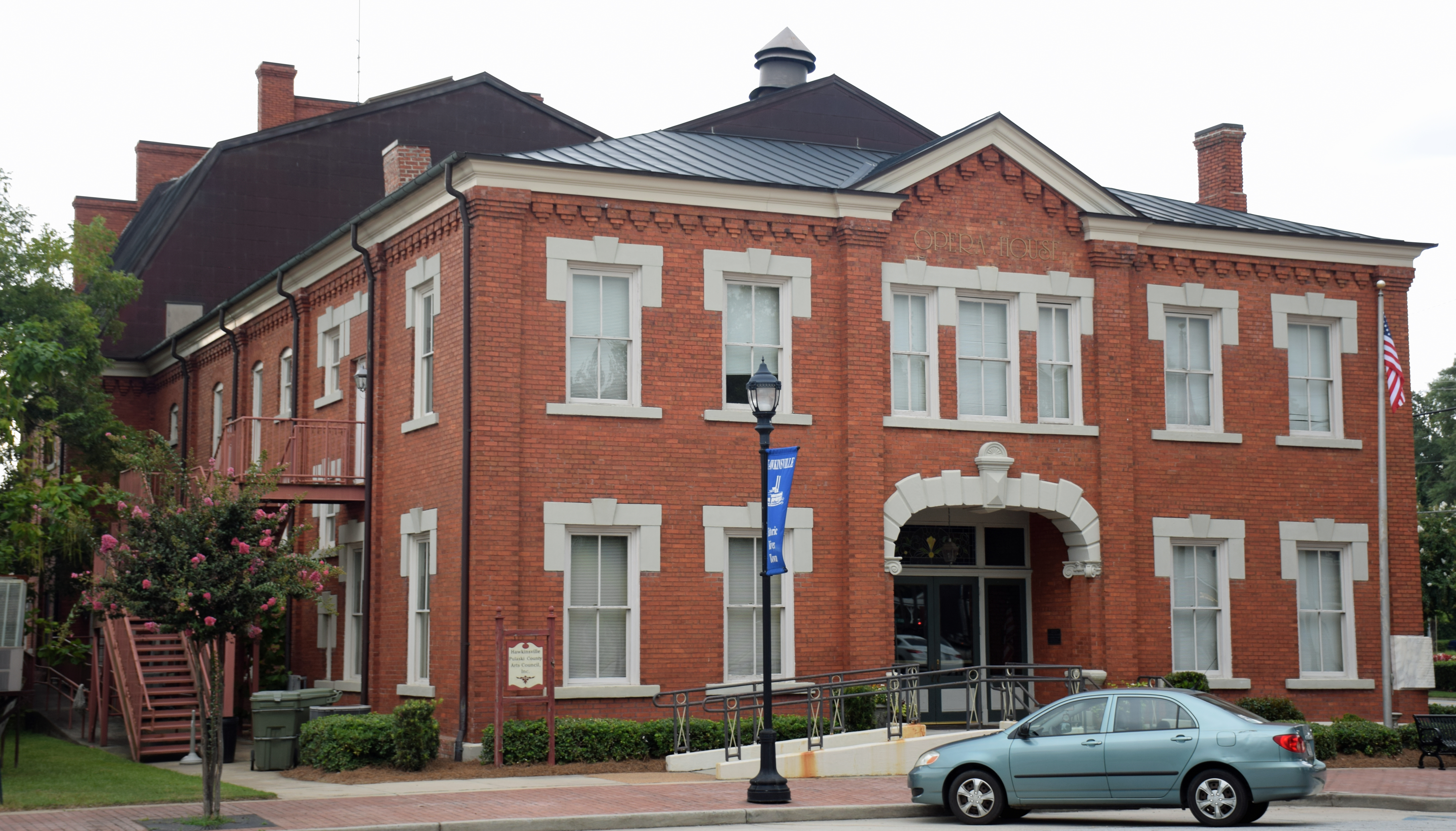
Hawkinsville Opera House, designed by Gunn

W.R. Gunn was a prominent architect of theaters in the American South. His work includes the Hawkinsville Opera House. He also designed the Grand Opera House (Macon, Georgia) (originally called the Academy of Music) at 651 Mulberry Street in Macon, Georgia. He also designed Merchants Block (1892) in Ocala, Florida. It contained a post office, lending library, and an office for "the precursor of the chamber of commerce", with professional offices upstairs. It was demolished in the 1960s to make way for a parking lot. He is also credited with the Perkins Opera House at Washington Street and Court House Square in Monticello, Florida.
