= Hawkinsville Opera House =

Historic opera house in the US state of Georgia

- Hawkinsville City Hall-Auditorium
- U.S. National Register of Historic Places
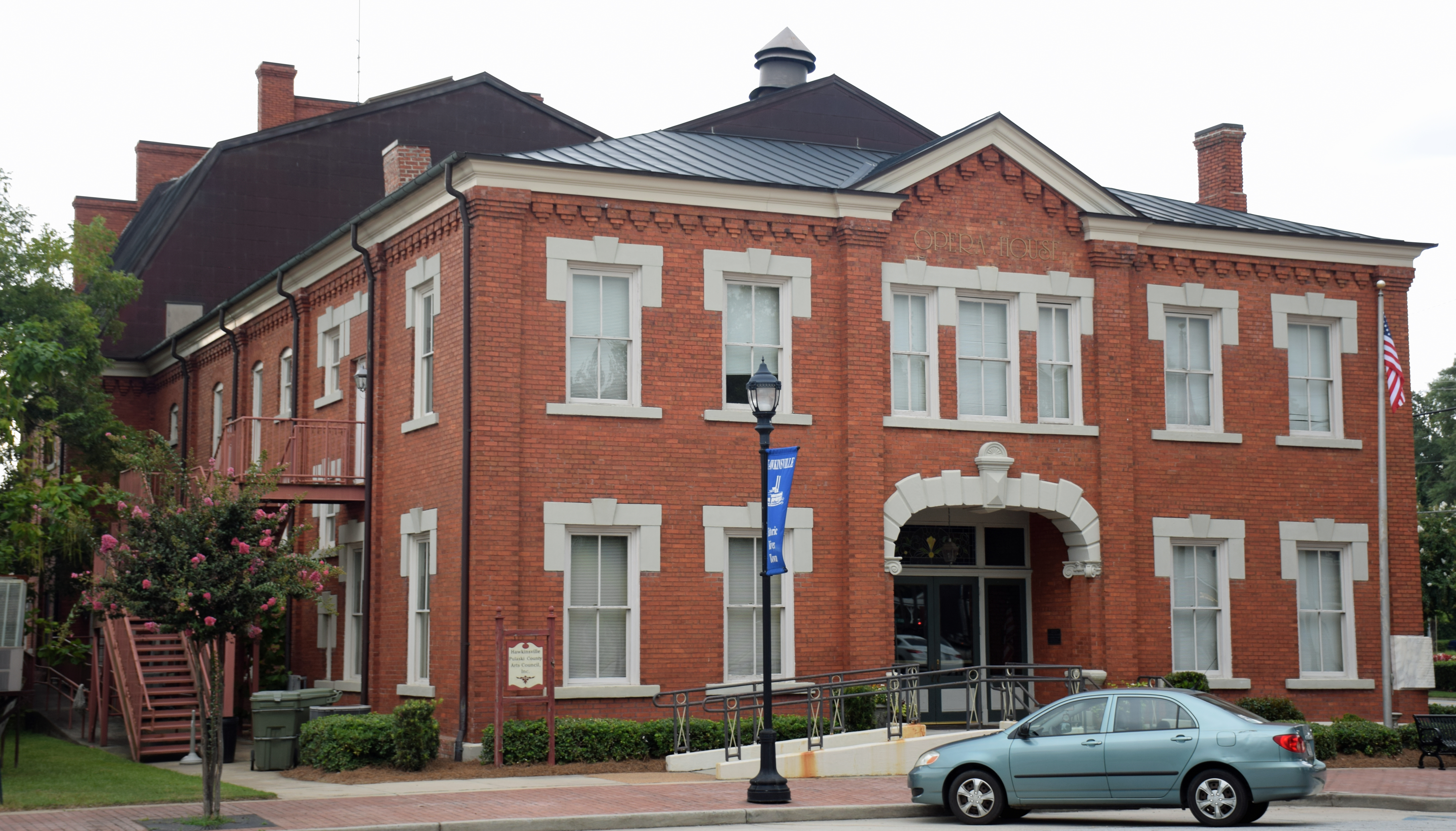

- Location within Georgia Location within the United States
- Location: Lumpkin and Broad Sts., Hawkinsville, Georgia
- Coordinates: 32.28233°N 83.46901°W
- Area: less than one acre
- Built: 1907
- Architect: Gunn, W.R.
- NRHP reference No.: 73000638
- Added to NRHP: March 1, 1973

Hawkinsville Opera House, originally known as the City Auditorium and sometimes referred to as Hawkinsville City Hall-Auditorium, is a theater building in downtown Hawkinsville, Georgia. It was built in 1907 after the city awarded a contract for a performing arts building to be constructed at a cost of $16,470. It was designed by Macon, Georgia architect and theater designer W.R. Gunn. With 576 seats, the theater had the largest seating capacity of any public building in Pulaski County, Georgia. It was added to the National Register of Historic Places in 1973 and underwent a 1.7 million dollar renovation 2000. It is managed by the non-profit Hawkinsville-Pulaski County Arts Council.

It was added to the National Register of Historic Places in 1973. It is located at the intersection of Lumpkin Street and Broad Street. It is also a contributing building in the Hawkinsville Commercial and Industrial Historic District.
