= Pulaski County, Georgia =

County in Georgia, United States

- County
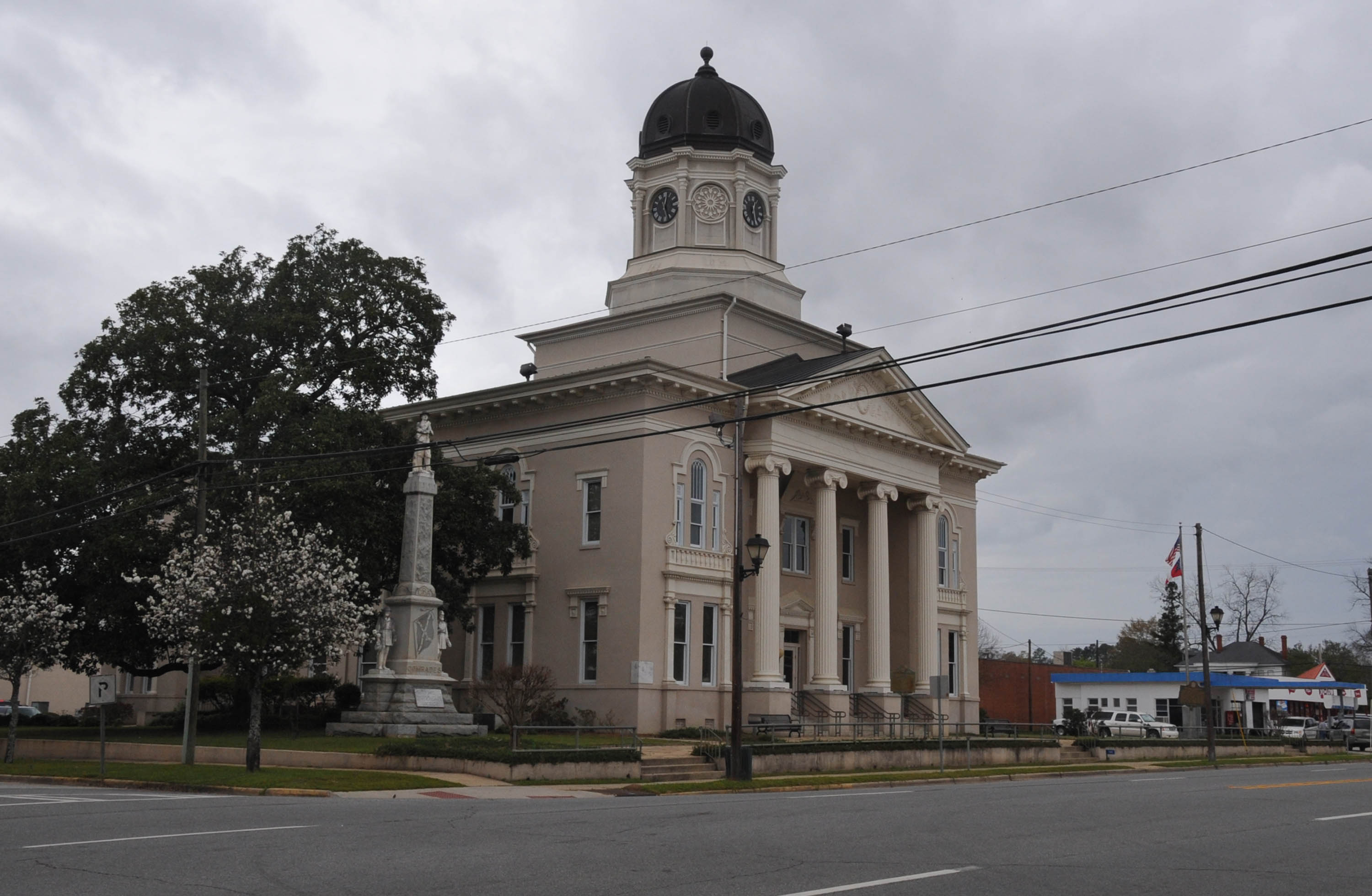
- Pulaski County Courthouse

- Location within the U.S. state of Georgia
- Coordinates: 32°14′N 83°28′W
- Country: United States
- State: Georgia
- Founded: December 13, 1808; 217 years ago
- Named for: Kazimierz Pułaski
- Seat: Hawkinsville
- Largest city: Hawkinsville

Area
  - Total: 251 sq mi (650 km^{2})
  - Land: 249 sq mi (640 km^{2})
  - Water: 2.2 sq mi (5.7 km^{2}) 0.9%

Population (2020)
  - Total: 9,855
  - Estimate (2025): 10,172 ▲
  - Density: 39.6/sq mi (15.3/km^{2})
- Time zone: UTC−5 (Eastern)
  - Summer (DST): UTC−4 (EDT)
- Congressional district: 8th
- Website: hawkinsville-pulaski.org

Pulaski County is a county located in the central portion of the U.S. state of Georgia. As of the 2020 census, the population was 9,855. The county seat is Hawkinsville.

== History ==
Pulaski County was created by an act of the Georgia General Assembly on December 13, 1808, from a portion of Laurens County. In the antebellum years, it was developed for cotton cultivation and is part of the Black Belt of Georgia, an arc of highly fertile soil.

In 1870, Dodge County was partially created from a section of Pulaski County by another legislative act. In 1912, the northeastern half of Pulaski County was used to create Bleckley County via a constitutional amendment approved by Georgia voters.

The county was named for Count Kazimierz Pułaski of Poland who fought and died for United States independence in the American Revolutionary War.

The county population fell by more than half from 1910 to 1930, as residents moved to cities. African Americans especially joined the Great Migration to northern and midwestern cities, both to gain work and to escape the Jim Crow racial oppression of the South.

== Geography ==
According to the U.S. Census Bureau, the county has a total area of 251 square miles (650 km^{2}), of which 249 square miles (640 km^{2}) is land and 2.2 square miles (5.7 km^{2}) (0.9%) is water. The entirety of Pulaski County is located in the Lower Ocmulgee River sub-basin of the Altamaha River basin.

=== Major highways ===
- U.S. Route 129
  - U.S. Route 129 Alternate
  - U.S. Route 129 Business
- U.S. Route 341
  - U.S. Route 341 Business
- State Route 11
  - State Route 11 Business
- State Route 26
- State Route 27
- State Route 112
- State Route 230
- State Route 247
- State Route 257

=== Adjacent counties ===
- Bleckley County - northeast
- Dodge County - east
- Wilcox County - south
- Dooly County - west
- Houston County - northwest

== Communities ==
=== City ===
- Hawkinsville (county seat)

=== Unincorporated community ===
- Hartford

== Demographics ==
Historical population
Census	Pop.	Note	%±
1810	2,093		—
1820	5,283		152.4%
1830	4,906		−7.1%
1840	5,389		9.8%
1850	6,627		23.0%
1860	8,744		31.9%
1870	11,940		36.6%
1880	14,058		17.7%
1890	16,559		17.8%
1900	18,489		11.7%
1910	22,835		23.5%
1920	11,587		−49.3%
1930	9,005		−22.3%
1940	9,829		9.2%
1950	8,808		−10.4%
1960	8,204		−6.9%
1970	8,066		−1.7%
1980	8,950		11.0%
1990	8,108		−9.4%
2000	9,588		18.3%
2010	12,010		25.3%
2020	9,855		−17.9%
2025 (est.)	10,172	▲	3.2%
U.S. Decennial Census; 1790-1880 1890-1910; 1920-1930 1930-1940; 1940-1950 1960-1980; 1980-2000 2010

=== Racial and ethnic composition ===
Pulaski County, Georgia – Racial and ethnic composition Note: the US Census treats Hispanic/Latino as an ethnic category. This table excludes Latinos from the racial categories and assigns them to a separate category. Hispanics/Latinos may be of any race.
Race / Ethnicity (NH = Non-Hispanic)	Pop 1980	Pop 1990	Pop 2000	Pop 2010	Pop 2020	% 1980	% 1990	% 2000	% 2010	% 2020
White alone (NH)	5,834	5,381	5,932	7,494	6,022	65.18%	66.37%	61.87%	62.40%	61.11%
Black or African American alone (NH)	3,043	2,623	3,249	3,808	3,161	34.00%	32.35%	33.89%	31.71%	32.08%
Native American or Alaska Native alone (NH)	1	7	21	30	8	0.01%	0.09%	0.22%	0.25%	0.08%
Asian alone (NH)	7	14	32	103	92	0.08%	0.17%	0.33%	0.86%	0.93%
Native Hawaiian or Pacific Islander alone (NH)	x	x	12	2	3	x	x	0.13%	0.02%	0.03%
Other race alone (NH)	8	0	4	18	48	0.09%	0.00%	0.04%	0.15%	0.49%
Mixed race or Multiracial (NH)	x	x	68	90	194	x	x	0.71%	0.75%	1.97%
Hispanic or Latino (any race)	57	83	270	465	327	0.64%	1.02%	2.82%	3.87%	3.32%
Total	8,950	8,108	9,588	12,010	9,855	100.00%	100.00%	100.00%	100.00%	100.00%

=== 2020 census ===
As of the 2020 census, the county had a population of 9,855, with 3,595 households and 2,479 families residing in the county.

The median age was 42.9 years. 18.7% of residents were under the age of 18 and 19.7% of residents were 65 years of age or older. For every 100 females there were 73.2 males, and for every 100 females age 18 and over there were 66.8 males age 18 and over. 0.0% of residents lived in urban areas, while 100.0% lived in rural areas.

The racial makeup of the county was 61.9% White, 32.2% Black or African American, 0.1% American Indian and Alaska Native, 0.9% Asian, 0.0% Native Hawaiian and Pacific Islander, 2.0% from some other race, and 2.8% from two or more races. Hispanic or Latino residents of any race comprised 3.3% of the population.

There were 3,595 households in the county, of which 27.6% had children under the age of 18 living with them and 33.0% had a female householder with no spouse or partner present. About 31.8% of all households were made up of individuals and 15.7% had someone living alone who was 65 years of age or older.

There were 4,281 housing units, of which 16.0% were vacant. Among occupied housing units, 69.5% were owner-occupied and 30.5% were renter-occupied. The homeowner vacancy rate was 2.0% and the rental vacancy rate was 10.9%.

== Government and infrastructure ==
Pulaski County is one of only a handful of counties in Georgia with the sole commissioner form of county government, in which the county is governed by a single elected official. Georgia is the only state that permits this form of government. In 2018, Jenna Mashburn was elected to the office of sole commissioner.

The Georgia Department of Corrections operates the Pulaski State Prison in Hawkinsville.

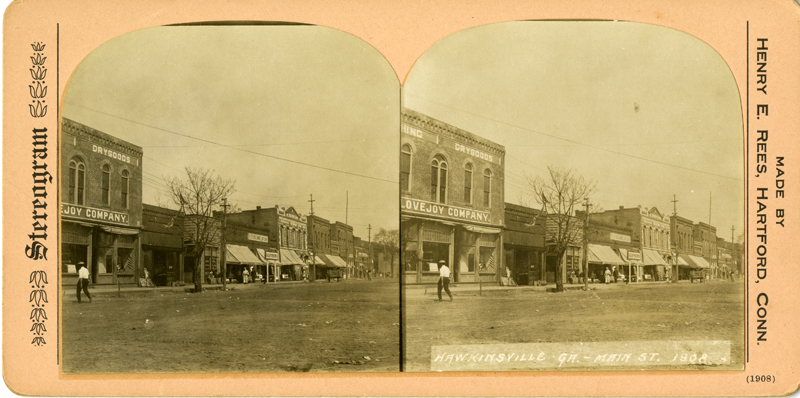
Main Street in Hawkinsville, Pulaski County, GA circa 1908

=== Politics ===
As of the 2020s, Pulaski County is a strongly Republican voting county, voting 70% for Donald Trump in 2024. For elections to the United States House of Representatives, Pulaski County is part of Georgia's 8th congressional district, currently represented by Austin Scott. For elections to the Georgia State Senate, Pulaski County is part of District 20. For elections to the Georgia House of Representatives, Pulaski County is part of District 148.

United States presidential election results for Pulaski County, Georgia
Year	Republican		Democratic		Third party(ies)	
Year	No.	%	No.	%	No.	%
1912	39	3.43%	1,080	95.07%	17	1.50%
1916	23	5.49%	383	91.41%	13	3.10%
1920	57	14.43%	338	85.57%	0	0.00%
1924	29	5.89%	442	89.84%	21	4.27%
1928	105	14.11%	639	85.89%	0	0.00%
1932	14	1.42%	973	98.58%	0	0.00%
1936	38	4.45%	808	94.61%	8	0.94%
1940	38	7.31%	478	91.92%	4	0.77%
1944	55	8.50%	592	91.50%	0	0.00%
1948	64	8.06%	567	71.41%	163	20.53%
1952	165	9.50%	1,572	90.50%	0	0.00%
1956	171	10.73%	1,422	89.27%	0	0.00%
1960	334	22.42%	1,156	77.58%	0	0.00%
1964	1,768	64.86%	953	34.96%	5	0.18%
1968	595	22.22%	514	19.19%	1,569	58.59%
1972	1,966	81.58%	444	18.42%	0	0.00%
1976	485	17.30%	2,318	82.70%	0	0.00%
1980	1,153	35.67%	1,997	61.79%	82	2.54%
1984	1,509	51.17%	1,440	48.83%	0	0.00%
1988	1,400	48.48%	1,476	51.11%	12	0.42%
1992	1,075	31.15%	1,756	50.88%	620	17.97%
1996	1,196	39.47%	1,554	51.29%	280	9.24%
2000	1,922	57.44%	1,390	41.54%	34	1.02%
2004	2,202	62.61%	1,294	36.79%	21	0.60%
2008	2,553	64.44%	1,377	34.76%	32	0.81%
2012	2,444	66.32%	1,219	33.08%	22	0.60%
2016	2,437	67.60%	1,104	30.62%	64	1.78%
2020	2,815	68.98%	1,230	30.14%	36	0.88%
2024	3,036	70.02%	1,281	29.54%	19	0.44%

United States Senate election results for Pulaski County, Georgia2
Year	Republican		Democratic		Third party(ies)	
Year	No.	%	No.	%	No.	%
2020	2,787	69.59%	1,139	28.44%	79	1.97%
2020	2,564	69.64%	1,118	30.36%	0	0.00%

United States Senate election results for Pulaski County, Georgia3
Year	Republican		Democratic		Third party(ies)	
Year	No.	%	No.	%	No.	%
2020	1,480	37.20%	815	20.49%	1,683	42.31%
2020	2,543	69.08%	1,138	30.92%	0	0.00%
2022	2,319	68.89%	1,002	29.77%	45	1.34%
2022	2,205	69.10%	986	30.90%	0	0.00%

Georgia Gubernatorial election results for Pulaski County
Year	Republican		Democratic		Third party(ies)	
Year	No.	%	No.	%	No.	%
2022	2,452	72.67%	905	26.82%	17	0.50%

== Education ==
Public education is provided by the Pulaski County School District.

== See also ==
- National Register of Historic Places listings in Pulaski County, Georgia
- List of counties in Georgia
