= Taylor Hall (Hawkinsville, Georgia) =

Historic house in Georgia, United States

- U.S. National Register of Historic Places
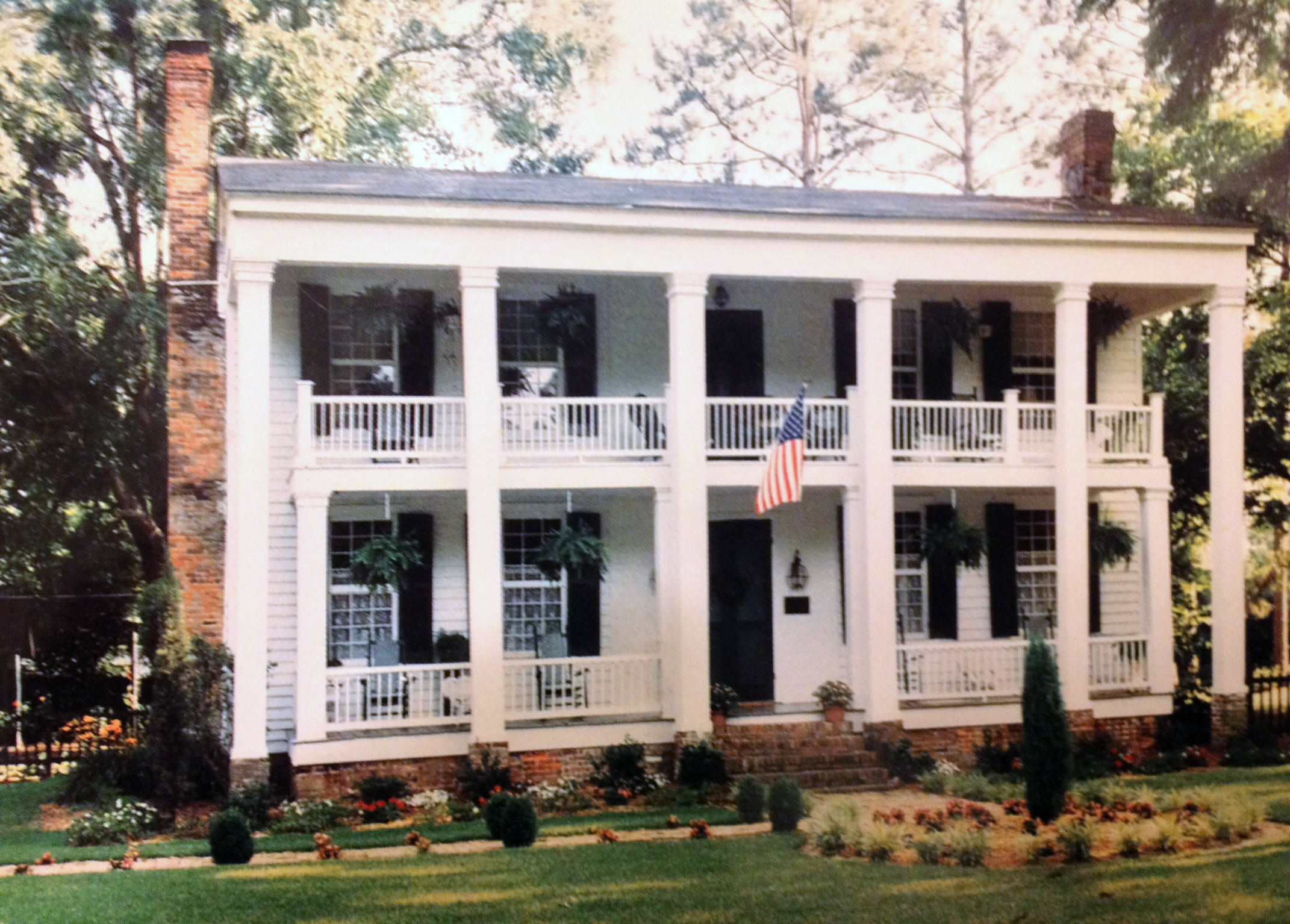

- Location within Georgia Location within the United States
- Location: 55 Kibbee St., Hawkinsville, Georgia
- Coordinates: 32.27545°N 83.47157°W
- Area: 4 acres (1.6 ha)
- Built: 1825
- Architectural style: Greek Revival, Plantation Plain
- NRHP reference No.: 78001000
- Added to NRHP: November 17, 1978

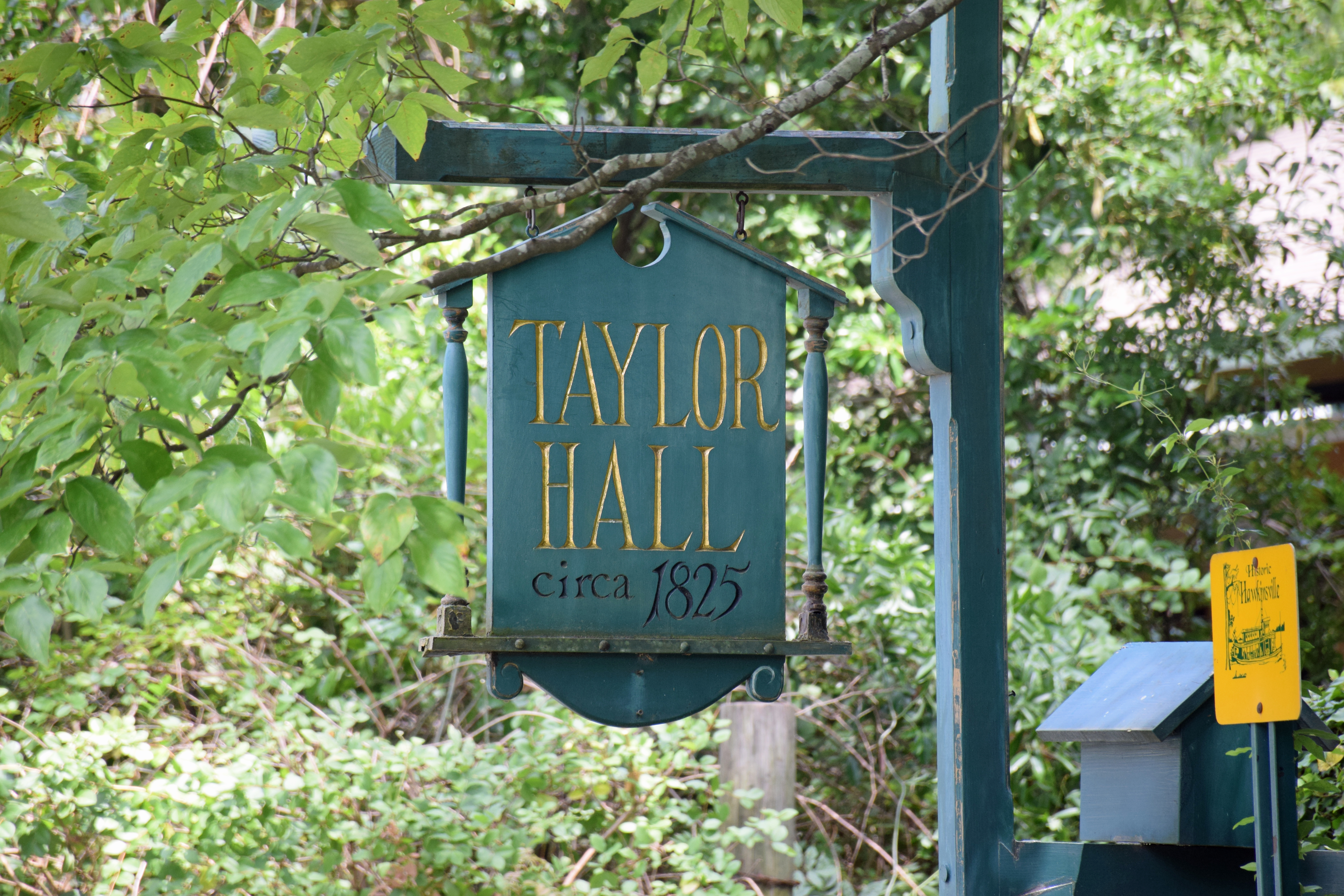
Sign for Taylor Hall

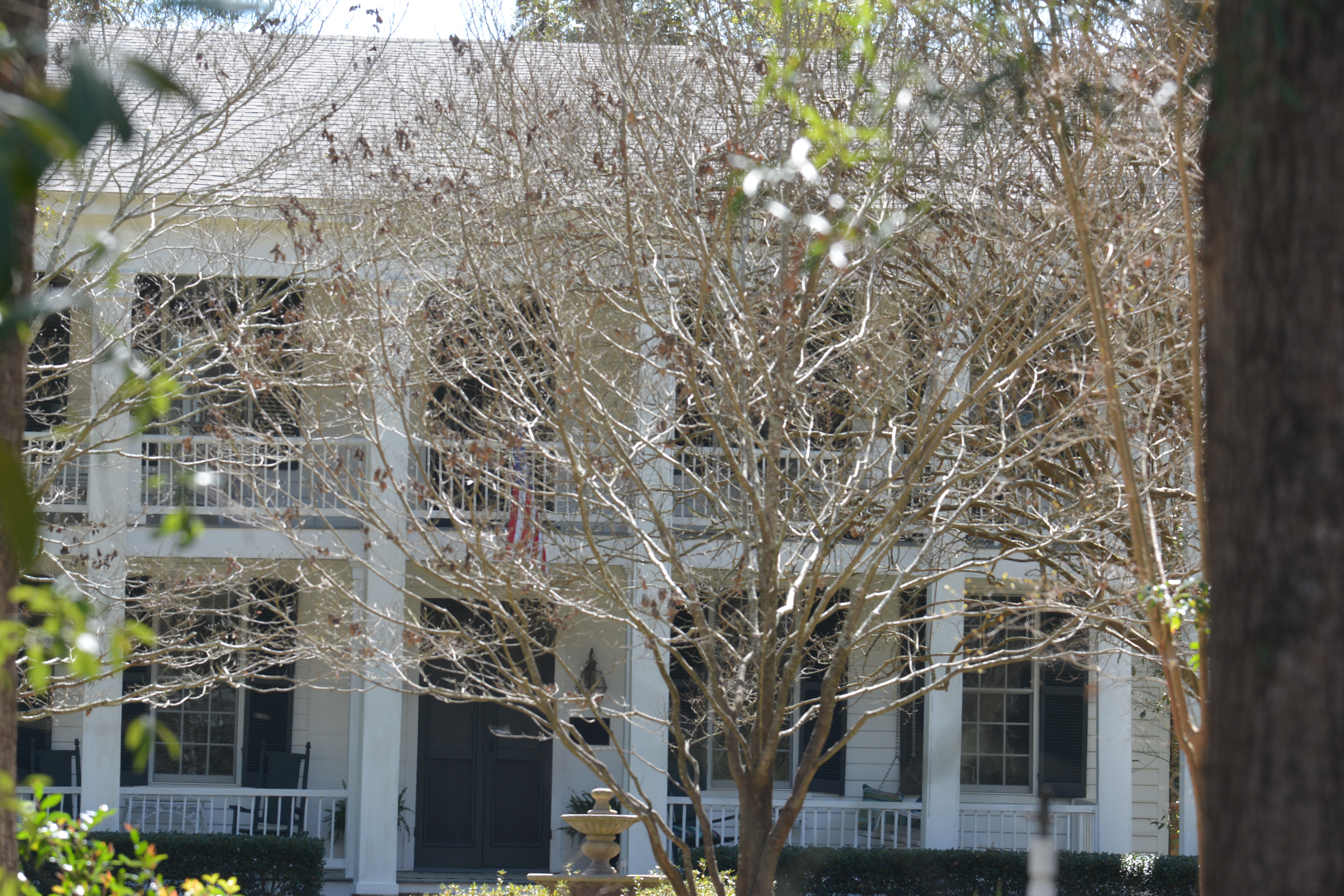
View from Kibbee Street

Taylor Hall in Hawkinsville, Georgia is a building built in 1825 with Greek Revival and "Plantation Plain" architectural elements. It was listed on the National Register of Historic Places in 1978.

Taylor Hall is the oldest house in Pulaski County. Dr. Robert Newsom Taylor used Creek Indian labor to construct Taylor Hall in 1824. Originally built on the banks of the Ocmulgee River in old Hartford, the house was dismantled in 1836 and ferried across the river to its present site. Taylor Hall has weathered Yankee encampments, marauding gypsies and period of neglect. Now restored, the house features the original wainscoting and hand-hewn pine planks. It is currently a private residence. It is down a private drive, with no good view from public property.
