= Hawkinsville, California =

Unincorporated community in California, United States

- Unincorporated community
- Location within California Location within the United States
- Coordinates: 41°45′39″N 122°37′19″W
- Country: United States
- State: California
- County: Siskiyou
- Elevation: 2,493 ft (760 m)
- Time zone: UTC-8 (Pacific (PST))
  - Summer (DST): UTC-7 (PDT)
- Area code: 530
- GNIS feature ID: 1659733

Hawkinsville is an unincorporated community located approximately two miles (3.2 km) north of Yreka in Siskiyou County, California, United States. It is 2,490 feet (759 m) above sea level.

== 2016 Grade Fire ==
On August 24, 2016, a fire broke out near the community and burned over 400 acres just two miles north of town.
