= Merritt-Ragan House =

Historic house in Georgia, United States

- U.S. National Register of Historic Places
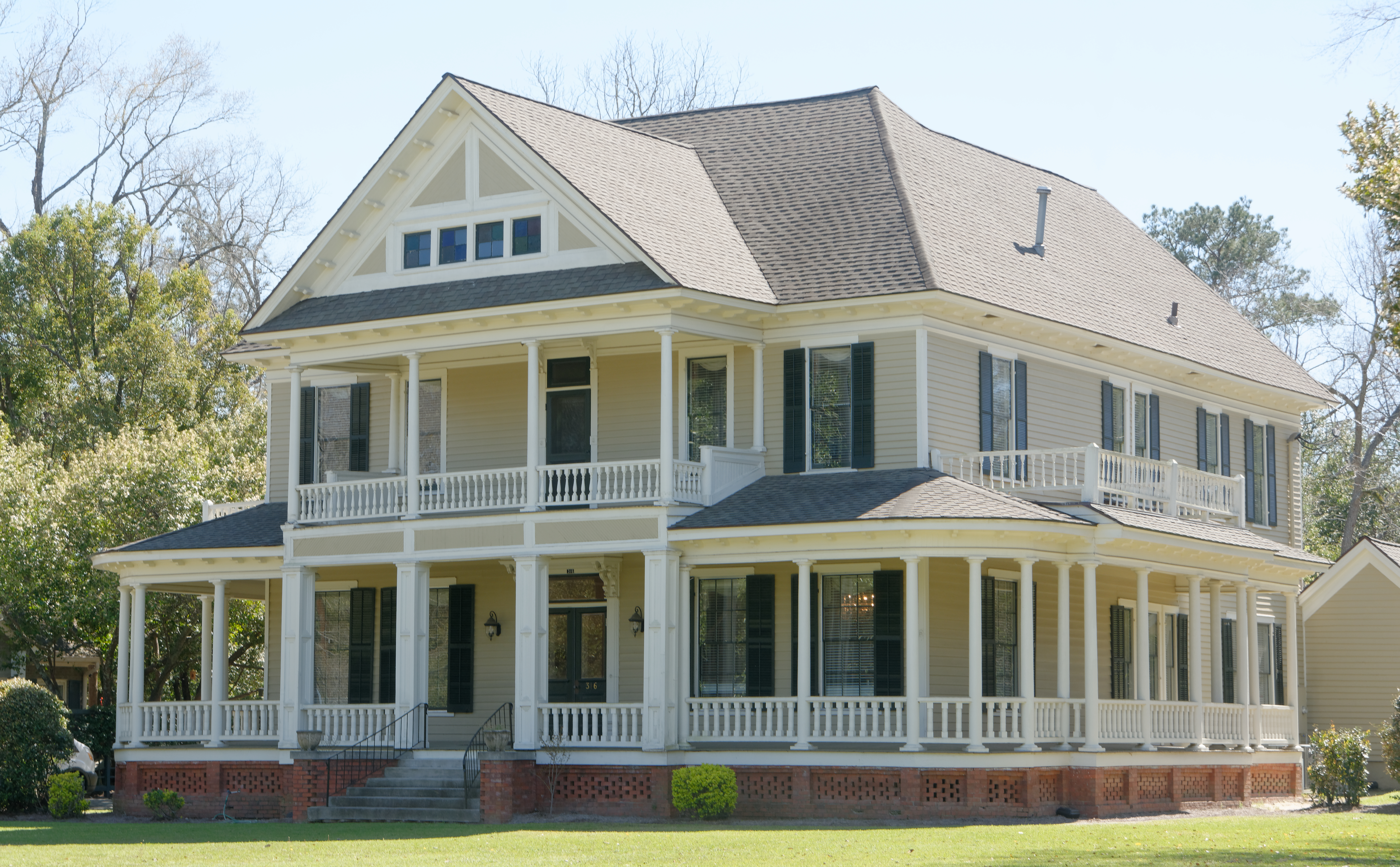
- The house in 2018

- Location within Georgia Location within the United States
- Location: 15 Merritt St., Hawkinsville, Georgia
- Coordinates: 32.2788°N 83.4678°W
- Area: 1.3 acres (0.53 ha)
- Built: c.1840, 1895, c.1930
- Architectural style: Queen Anne
- NRHP reference No.: 91001156
- Added to NRHP: August 29, 1991

The Merritt-Ragan House in Hawkinsville, Georgia is listed on the National Register of Historic Places.

It is a two-story frame house with elements of Classical Revival and Queen Anne architecture. It was built in c.1840 with symmetrical design, square paneled portico columns and other elements of Classical Revival style. It was renovated in 1895 into its two-story form, with a wrap-around porch. It has a c.1930 garage that is a second contributing building in the listing.

It is located at 15 Merritt St., which before a renumbering of the street addresses was 316 Merritt St., the address given in its NRHP listing.
