= Hawkinsville Commercial and Industrial Historic District =

Historic district in Georgia, United States

- U.S. National Register of Historic Places
- U.S. Historic district
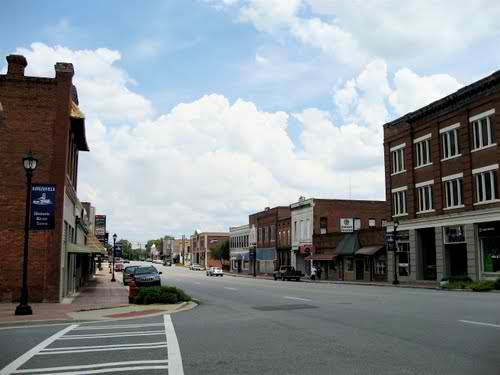

- Location within Georgia Location within the United States
- Location: Roughly bounded by Dooly, Broad, Houston, and 3rd Sts., Hawkinsville, Georgia
- Coordinates: 32°17′04″N 83°28′01″W
- Area: 60 acres (24 ha)
- Built: 1830
- Architect: E.A. Burch, W.R. Gunn
- Architectural style: Italianate, Romanesque
- NRHP reference No.: 04001349
- Added to NRHP: December 13, 2004

The Hawkinsville Commercial and Industrial Historic District is a historic district in Georgia, United States that was listed on the National Register of Historic Places in 2004.

The district includes the Pulaski County Courthouse (1874) and the Hawkinsville Opera House (1907), which are both listed separately on the National Register. The layout of the commercial center of the town is on the Augusta plan, in which the courthouse is located on a main street rather than upon a central square.

It includes 92 contributing buildings, four other contributing structures, one contributing site and one contributing object. It also includes 38 non-contributing buildings and two non-contributing objects.

== Photos ==
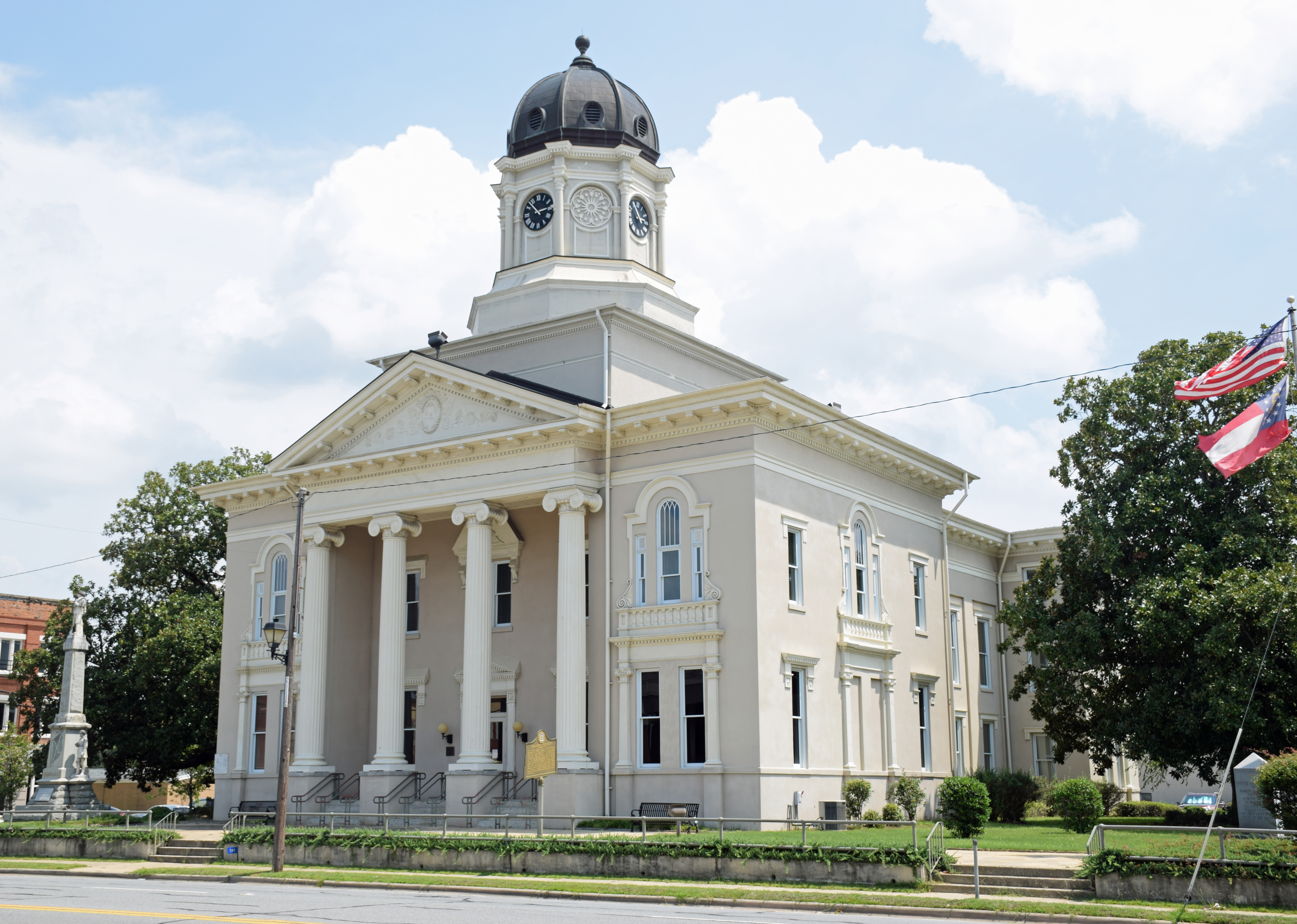
Pulaski County Courthouse

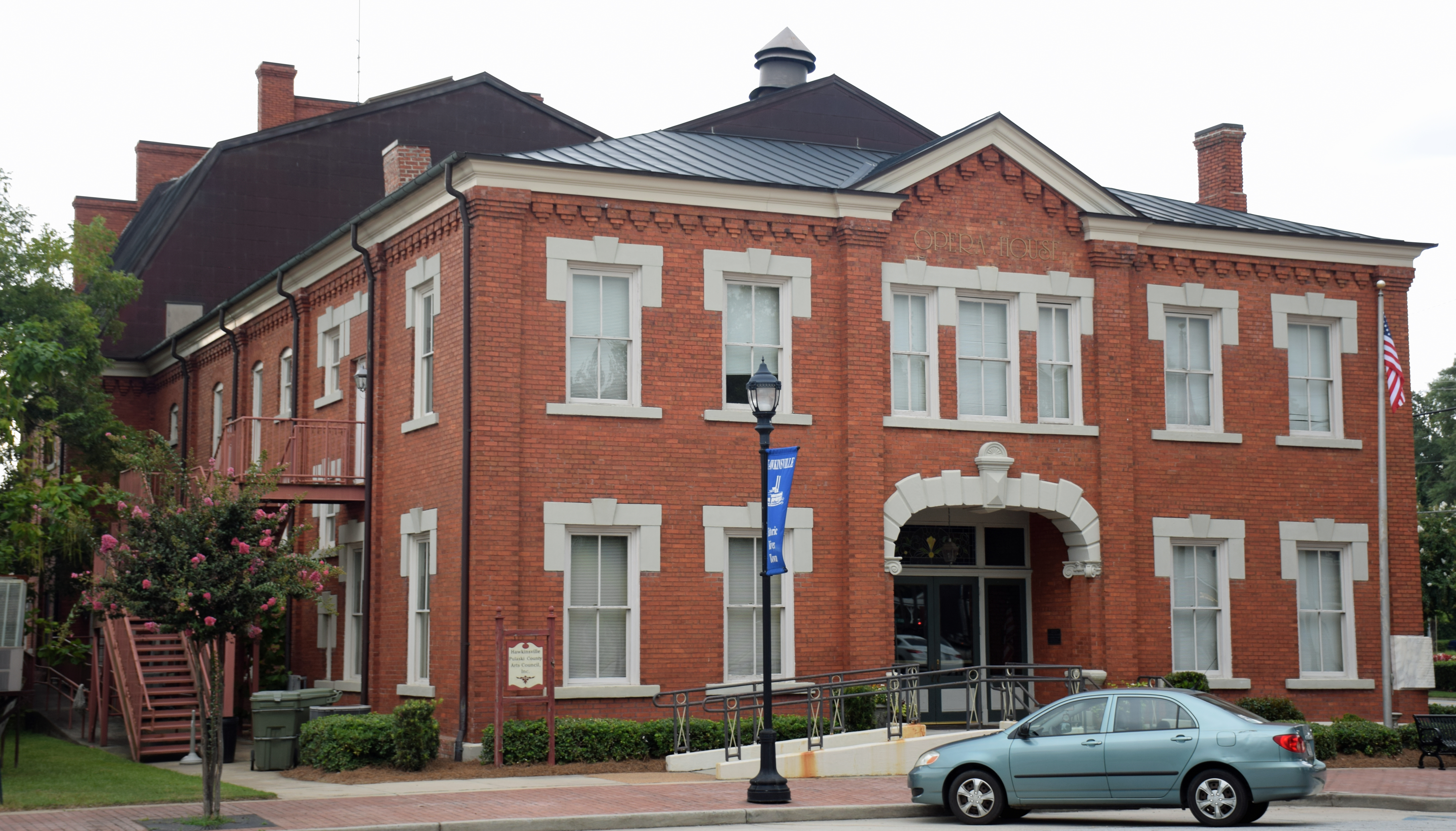
Hawkinsville Opera House

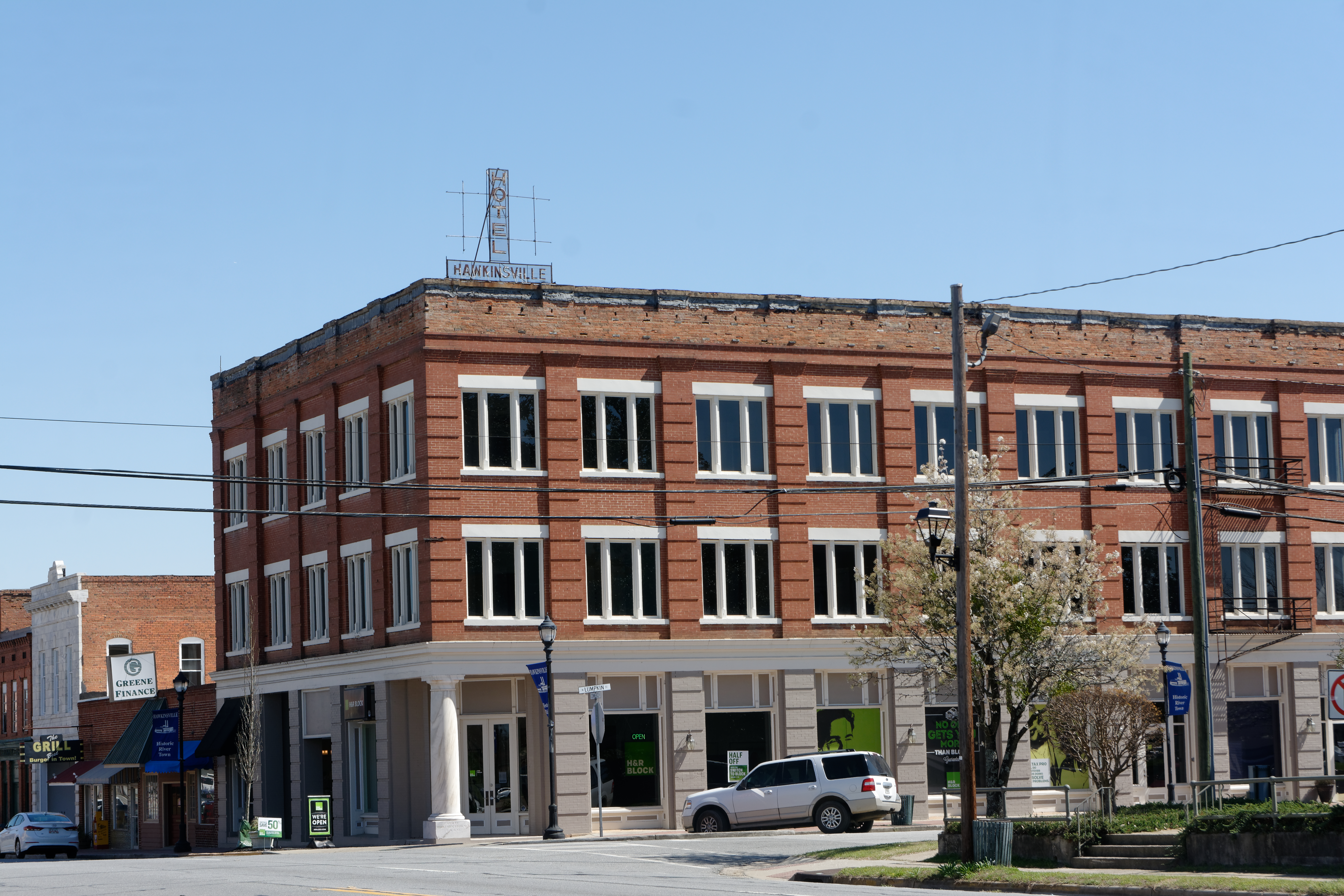
Hawkinsville Hotel

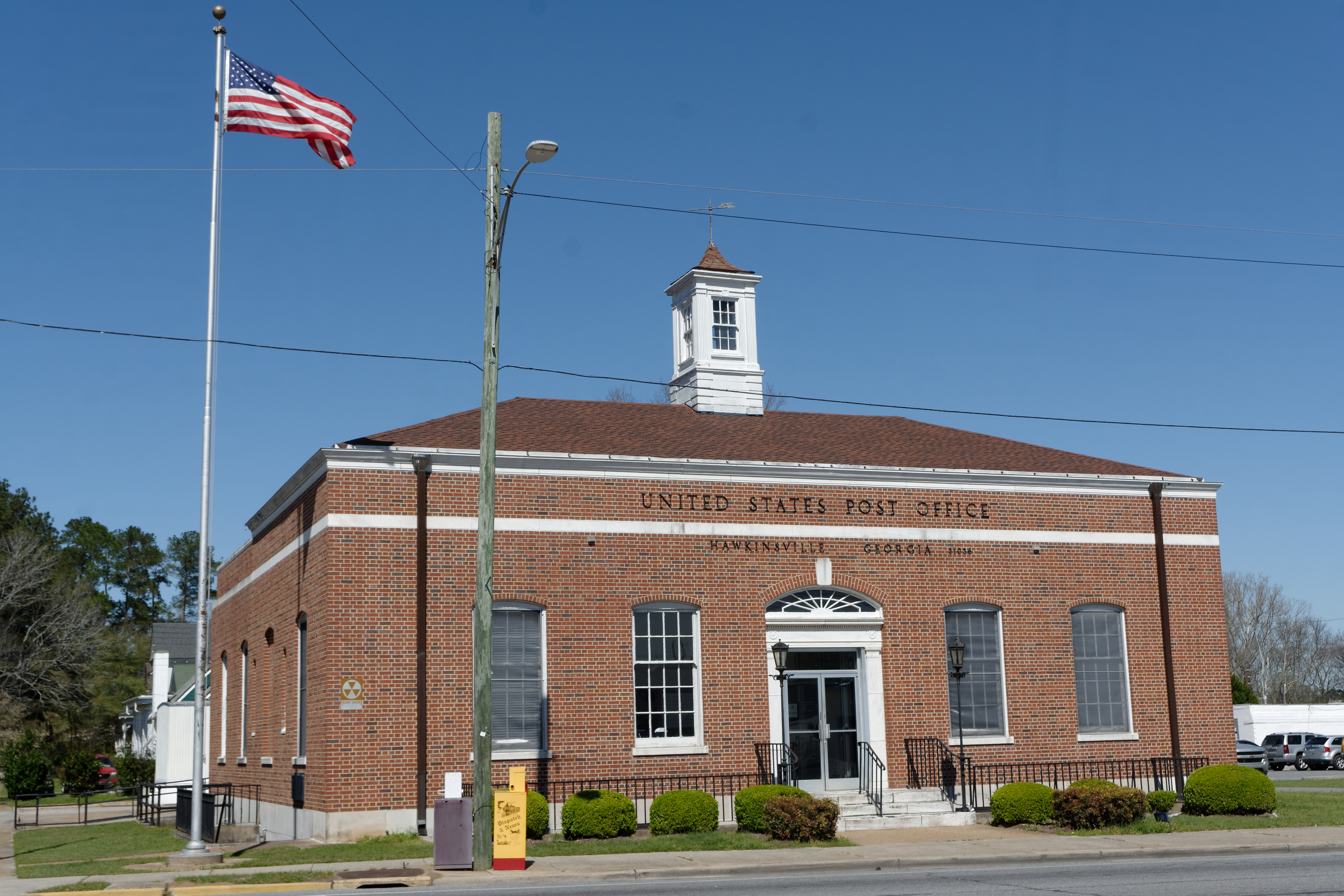
US Post Office

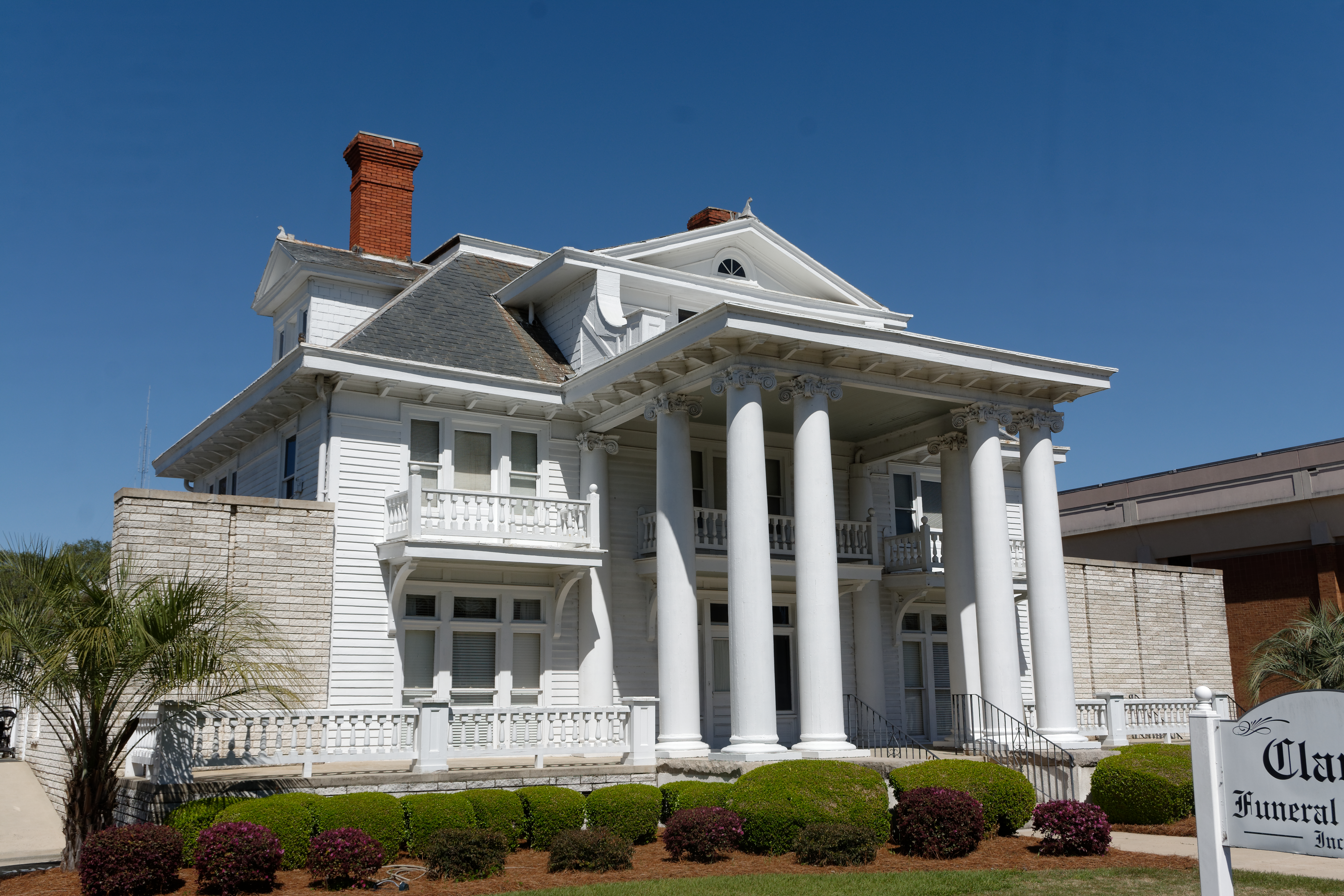
House at 142 Commerce Street

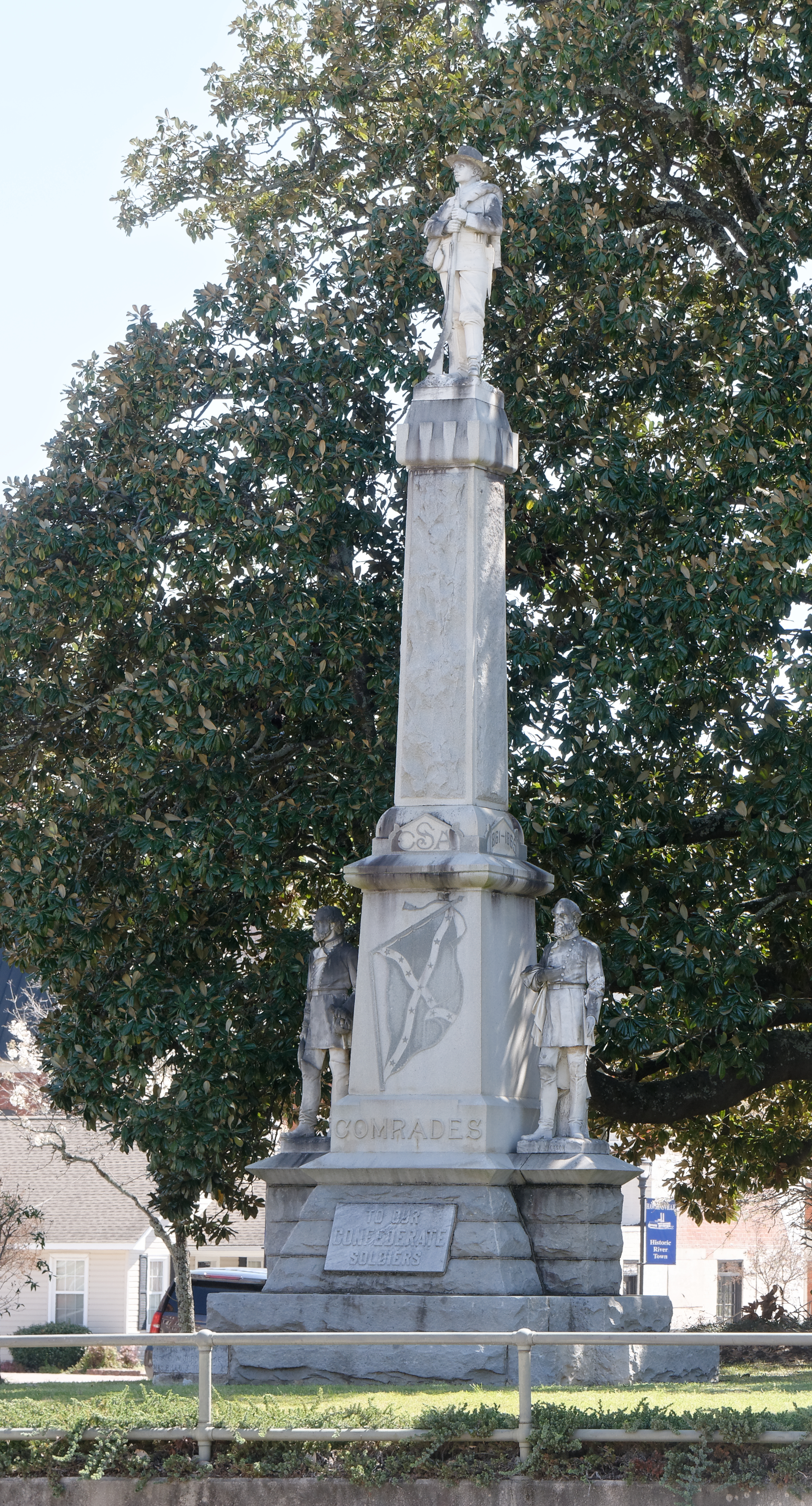
Confederate memorial
