= Pulaski County Courthouse (Georgia) =

Historic courthouse in Georgia, US

- U.S. Historic district – Contributing property
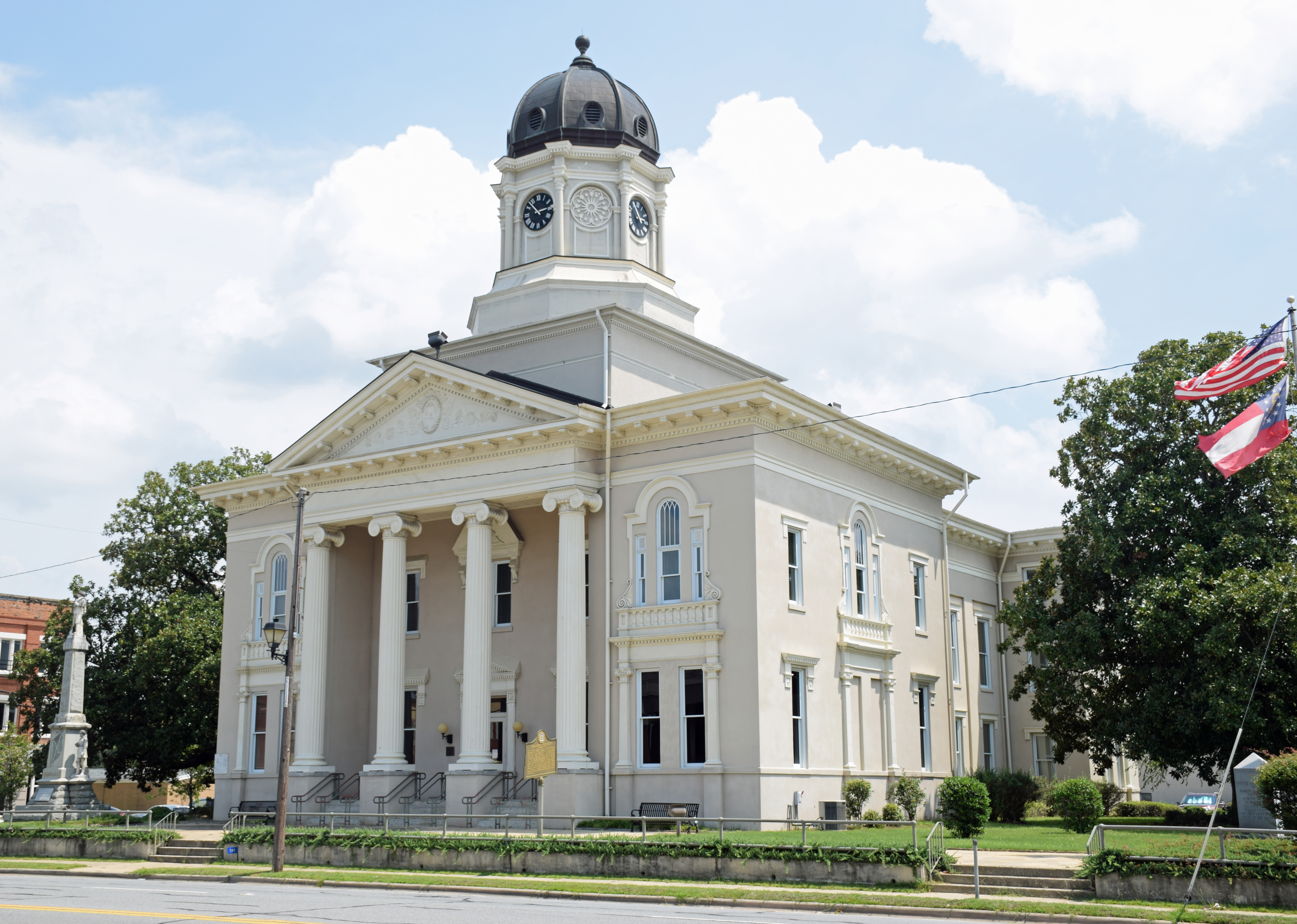
- The county courthouse in 2015 as seen from Commerce Street.

- Location within Georgia Location within the United States
- Interactive map showing the location of Pulaski County Courthouse
- Location: Courthouse Sq., Hawkinsville, Georgia
- Coordinates: 32.28295°N 83.46902°W
- Built: 1874, 1885, 1897, 1910
- Architectural style: Classical Revival
- Part of: Hawkinsville Commercial and Industrial Historic District (ID04001349)
- Added to NRHP: September 18, 1980

Pulaski County Courthouse is a Classical Revival building in Hawkinsville, Georgia dating from 1874. The building is located on the southwest corner of Commerce Street (US BUS 129/341/SRs 11 BUS/26) and North Lumpkin Street. It was listed on the National Register of Historic Places in 1980.

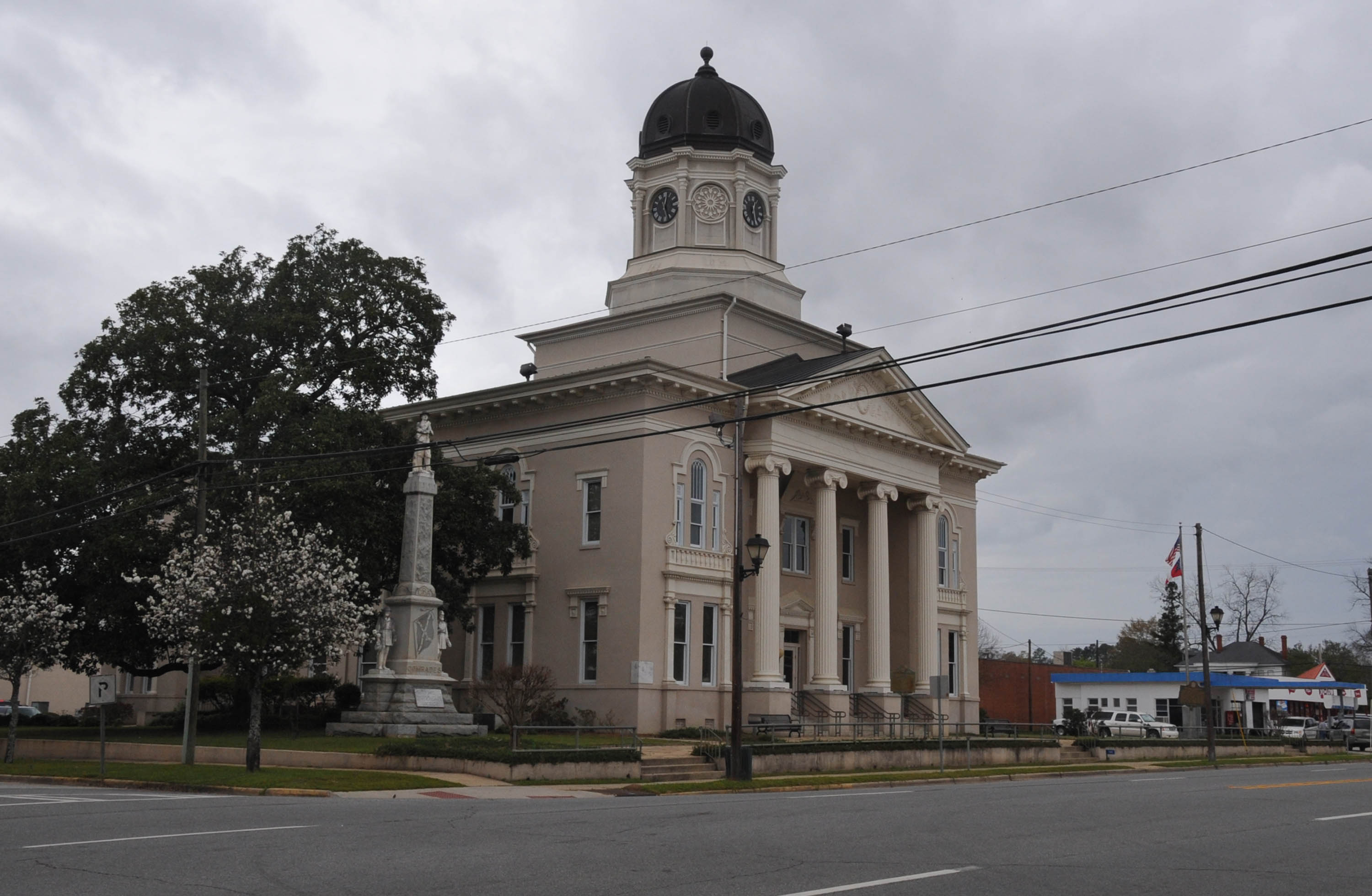
Courthouse in 2012

The core of the building was built in 1874. In 1885, the courthouse's clock was added. In 1897 and 1910, it had major additions. It is unusual among courthouses for having a chapel, just outside the entrance to the courtroom, which is used for weddings and prayer groups.

The courthouse is a contributing building in the Hawkinsville Commercial and Industrial Historic District.
