= Hawkinsville, Georgia =

- City
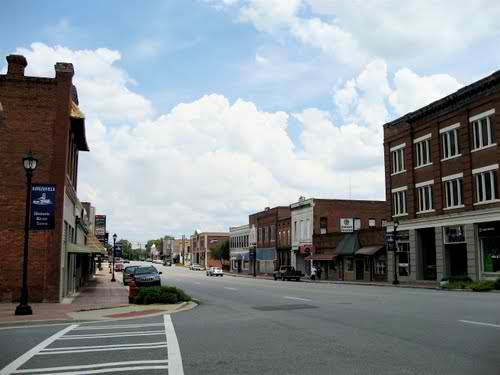
- Nicknames: The Good Life, Harness Capital of the World
- Motto: Where Progress Sets Pace
- Location in Pulaski County and the state of Georgia
- Coordinates: 32°17′1″N 83°28′36″W
- Country: United States
- State: Georgia
- County: Pulaski

Government
  - Type: Council-Manager
  - Council Chairperson: Bernice Banks
  - City Manager: Sara Myers

Area
  - Total: 5.38 sq mi (13.93 km^{2})
  - Land: 5.37 sq mi (13.91 km^{2})
  - Water: 0.0077 sq mi (0.02 km^{2})
- Elevation: 260 ft (80 m)

Population (2020)
  - Total: 3,980
  - Density: 741.1/sq mi (286.14/km^{2})
- Time zone: UTC-5 (Eastern (EST))
  - Summer (DST): UTC-4 (EDT)
- ZIP code: 31036
- Area code: 478
- FIPS code: 13235
- GNIS feature ID: 0331934
- Website: hawkinsville-pulaski.org

Hawkinsville is a city in Middle Georgia and the county seat of Pulaski County, Georgia, United States. As of 2020, it has a population of 3,980.

The city is known as the "Harness Horse Capital of Georgia" and holds an annual Harness Horse Festival to celebrate its connections to the sport. Hawkinsville is also known as the "Highway Hub," with seven major highways running through the city.

== History ==
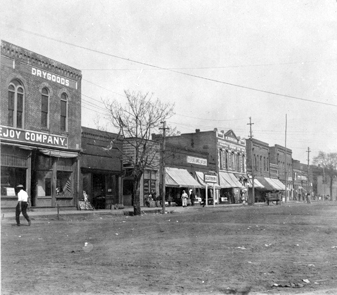
Main Street, 1908

Hawkinsville was founded in 1830, and in 1836, it replaced Hartford as the county seat of Pulaski County. The city was named after Colonel Benjamin Hawkins, a Senator and Delegate to the Continental Congress from North Carolina. After the war ended, he was appointed Indian agent in charge of affairs south of the Ohio River by George Washington.

Well before the city's formal establishment, Hawkinsville was a key center for regional trade and travel. It was situated along the Slosheye Trail, a trading route dating back to around 1750 that connected the area to Drayton, Georgia. This trail was used by Native Americans and early European traders throughout the area. The traffic on the trail continued to grow, and it was eventually turned into a road. Its location is marked on what is now Commerce Street in Downtown Hawkinsville.

In 1818 General Andrew Jackson is believed to have passed through the city while travelling to Florida during the First Seminole War. The trail is designated by the Andrew Jackson Trail historical marker in the city.

Hawkinsville is known as the "Harness Horse Capital of Georgia." Since 1894, the city has hosted harness racing events. Beginning in the 1920s, harness horses have travelled from colder climates to train Hawkinsville due to its Hawkinsville's mild winters. The city holds an annual Harness Festival on the first Saturday in April to celebrate the legacy of harness racing in Hawkinsville.

== Geography ==
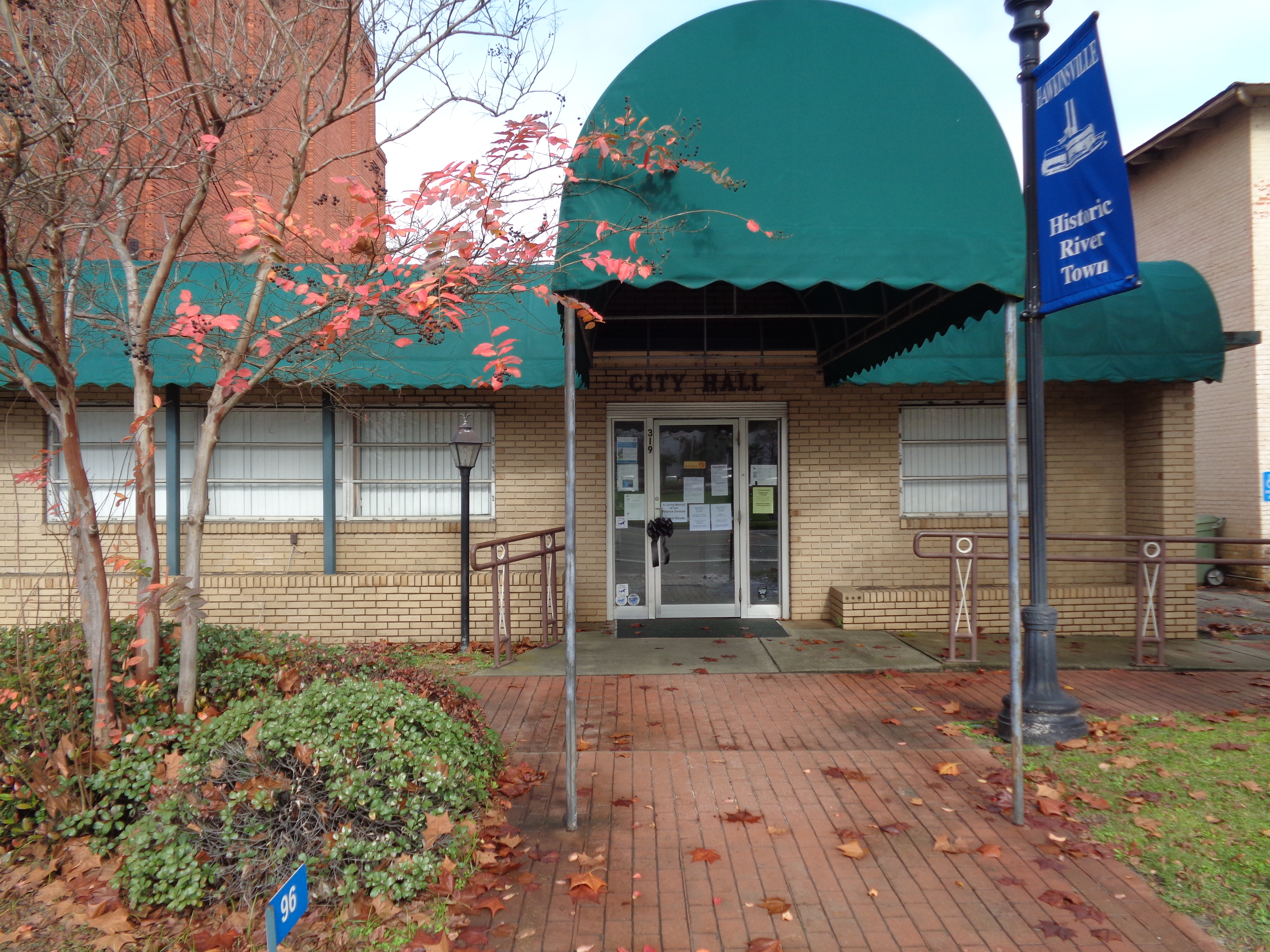
Hawkinsville City Hall

According to the United States Census Bureau, the city has a total area of 5.39 square miles (14.0 km^{2}), of which 5.38 square miles (13.9 km^{2}) is land and 0.01 square miles (0.026 km^{2}) (1.57%) is water.

=== Climate ===
Hawkinsville has a humid subtropical climate (Köppen climate classification Cfa), with mild winters and hot, humid summers.

Climate data for Hawkinsville, Georgia (1991-2020 normals, extremes 1892–present)
Month	Jan	Feb	Mar	Apr	May	Jun	Jul	Aug	Sep	Oct	Nov	Dec	Year
Record high °F (°C)	86 (30)	88 (31)	96 (36)	99 (37)	102 (39)	107 (42)	106 (41)	107 (42)	110 (43)	102 (39)	90 (32)	89 (32)	110 (43)
Mean daily maximum °F (°C)	58.8 (14.9)	62.8 (17.1)	70.1 (21.2)	77.4 (25.2)	85.0 (29.4)	90.2 (32.3)	92.4 (33.6)	91.1 (32.8)	86.8 (30.4)	78.3 (25.7)	68.7 (20.4)	61.1 (16.2)	76.9 (24.9)
Mean daily minimum °F (°C)	34.8 (1.6)	37.2 (2.9)	43.1 (6.2)	49.9 (9.9)	59.0 (15.0)	67.1 (19.5)	70.1 (21.2)	69.6 (20.9)	64.0 (17.8)	52.7 (11.5)	42.0 (5.6)	36.7 (2.6)	52.2 (11.2)
Record low °F (°C)	−2 (−19)	−3 (−19)	15 (−9)	28 (−2)	36 (2)	45 (7)	55 (13)	52 (11)	35 (2)	23 (−5)	11 (−12)	5 (−15)	−3 (−19)
Average rainfall inches (mm)	4.65 (118)	4.33 (110)	4.52 (115)	3.69 (94)	2.90 (74)	4.39 (112)	4.66 (118)	4.68 (119)	4.07 (103)	2.92 (74)	3.14 (80)	4.59 (117)	48.54 (1,234)
Source: NOAA

== Demographics ==
Historical population
Census	Pop.	Note	%±
1870	813		—
1880	1,542		89.7%
1890	1,755		13.8%
1900	2,103		19.8%
1910	3,420		62.6%
1920	3,070		−10.2%
1930	2,484		−19.1%
1940	3,000		20.8%
1950	3,342		11.4%
1960	3,967		18.7%
1970	4,077		2.8%
1980	4,372		7.2%
1990	3,527		−19.3%
2000	3,280		−7.0%
2010	4,589		39.9%
2020	3,980		−13.3%
U.S. Decennial Census

=== 2020 census ===
As of the 2020 census, Hawkinsville had a population of 3,980, with 1,449 households. The median age was 39.2 years. 20.9% of residents were under the age of 18 and 18.8% were age 65 or older. For every 100 females, there were 71.1 males, and for every 100 females age 18 and over, there were 62.6 males age 18 and over.

Of the 1,449 households, 31.5% had children under the age of 18 living in them. Of all households, 33.0% were married-couple households, 20.9% were households with a male householder and no spouse or partner present, and 40.9% were households with a female householder and no spouse or partner present. About 34.0% of all households were made up of individuals, and 15.7% had someone living alone who was age 65 or older.

There were 1,740 housing units, of which 16.7% were vacant. The homeowner vacancy rate was 3.0%, and the rental vacancy rate was 12.4%.

0.0% of residents lived in urban areas, while 100.0% lived in rural areas.

Hawkinsville racial composition (2020)
Race	Num.	Perc.
White	1,925	48.37%
Black or African American	1,822	45.78%
Native American	6	0.15%
Asian	47	1.18%
Pacific Islander	1	0.03%
Other/Mixed	90	2.26%
Hispanic or Latino	89	2.24%

== Economy ==
The Georgia Department of Corrections operates the Pulaski State Prison in Hawkinsville.

The United States Postal Service operates the Hawkinsville Post Office.

== Arts and culture ==
=== National Register of Historic Places ===
- Hawkinsville Opera House, constructed in 1907, has served as an entertainment venue, religious gathering place, and government center.
- Hawkinsville Public School, constructed between 1936 and 1969.
- Merritt-Ragan House, a Queen-Anne style home built in 1840.
- Pulaski County Courthouse, constructed in 1874.
- Taylor Hall, moved to Hawkinsville in 1836.
- St. Thomas African Methodist Episcopal Church, constructed between 1908 and 1912.
- R.J. Taylor Memorial Hospital, which operated from 1938 to 1976.
- Hawkinsville Commercial and Industrial Historic District.

== Education ==
=== Pulaski County School District ===
The Pulaski County School District holds grades pre-school to grade twelve. It consists of one elementary school, a middle school, and a high school. The district has 95.70 full-time teachers and 1,341 students.

- Pulaski County Elementary School
- Pulaski County Middle School
- Hawkinsville High School

=== Central Georgia Technical College ===
Central Georgia Technical College operates the Sam Way, Sr. Hawkinsville Workforce Development Center. The Center offers an array of educational opportunities, including adult education, dual enrollment courses, and continuing education.

== Infrastructure ==
Highways include:

- U.S. Route 129
- U.S. Route 341
- Georgia State Route 26
- Georgia State Route 27
- Georgia State Route 257
- Georgia State Route 230

== Notable people ==
- Exxon Valdez Captain Joseph Hazelwood was born in Hawkinsville.
- Charles Johnson, former defensive end for the Carolina Panthers, was born in Hawkinsville.
- Jeezy (musician and businessman) was born in Columbia, South Carolina but was raised in Hawkinsville.
- Eva C. Mitchell, professor of education at Hampton University from 1930 to 1960, born in Hawkinsville.
- Robert Henry Scarborough Jr. (former Vice Admiral of the United States Coast Guard) was born and raised in Hawkinsville.
- Tom Forkner, co-founder of Waffle House, was born in Hawkinsville.
- Inez Tannenbaum, former South Carolina Superintendent of Education and chairperson of U.S. Consumer Product Safety Commission was born in Hawkinsville.
