= Hawkinsville Public School =

- U.S. National Register of Historic Places
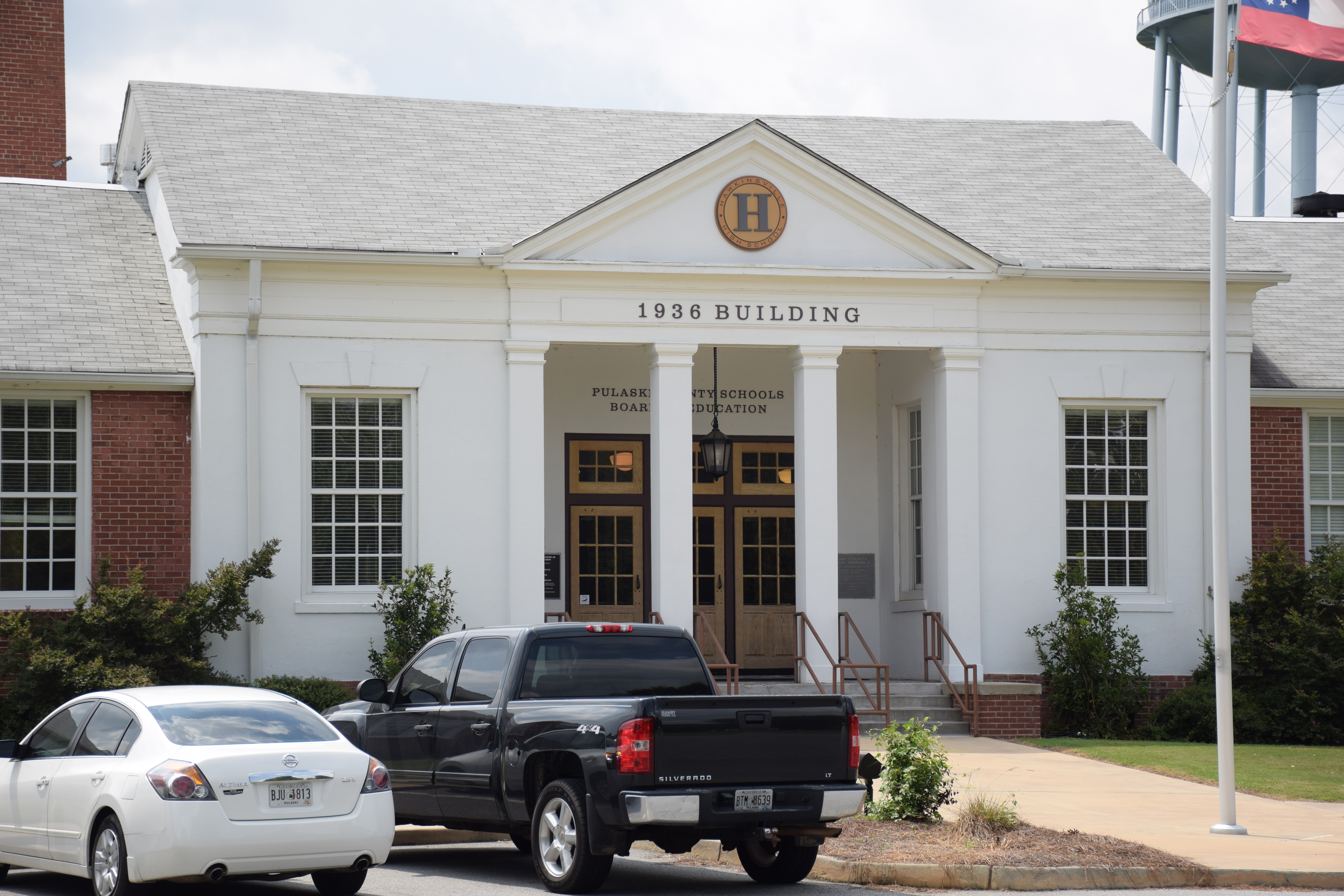

- Location within Georgia Location within the United States
- Location: 215 Warren St., Hawkinsville, Georgia
- Coordinates: 32.27871°N 83.47349°W
- Area: 12 acres (4.9 ha)
- Built: 1936
- Architect: Dunwoody, William Elliott Jr.
- Architectural style: International Style, Colonial Revival
- NRHP reference No.: 08000492
- Added to NRHP: May 28, 2008

The Hawkinsville Public School, which has also been known as Hawkinsville High School during c. 1956-1975 and as Pulaski County Middle School during 1975–1990, was listed on the National Register of Historic Places in 2008.

The property includes a school building built in 1936 with 1949, 1950, 1951 and c. 1968-1969 additions, a separate non-contributing building built in 1954, and a c. 1959 water tower. The 1936 building was funded by the Public Works Administration, included 13 classrooms and an auditorium, and has a Colonial Revival style with a brick veneer, and was designed by W. Elliott Dunwody, Jr. (1893-1986) of Macon, Georgia. Two later additions were in International Style.

In 2008, the property was "a multi-purpose facility housing an alternative school, pre-kindergarten, and school system offices."
