= Georgia State Route 86 =

Highway in Georgia, United States

State Route 86
- SR 86 highlighted in red

Route information
- Maintained by GDOT
- Length: 51.3 mi (82.6 km)
- Existed: 1941–present

Major junctions
- West end: SR 29 southeast of East Dublin
- SR 15 / SR 78 in Blackville; US 221 / SR 56 northeast of Soperton; SR 46 from west of Oak Park to Oak Park; SR 297 west of Oak Park; US 1 / SR 4 / SR 46 in Oak Park; SR 152 northeast of Lyons; SR 292 east of Lyons
- East end: US 280 / SR 30 southeast of Lyons

Location
- Country: United States
- State: Georgia
- Counties: Laurens, Treutlen, Emanuel, Toombs

Highway system
- Georgia State Highway System; Interstate; US; State; Special
| ← SR 85 | → SR 87 |

State Route 86 (SR 86) is a 51.3-mile-long (82.6 km) state highway that travels mostly through rural areas of the central part of the U.S. state of Georgia. The highway travels from a point southeast of East Dublin southeast to a point about halfway between Lyons and Reidsville, via Oak Park.

== Route description ==
SR 86 begins at an intersection with SR 29 southeast of East Dublin. The highway heads easterly to an intersection with SR 15/SR 78 in Blackville. Farther to the southeast, SR 86 crosses over, but does not have an interchange with, Interstate 16 (I-16) northeast of Soperton. Almost immediately afterward, US 221/SR 56 crosses the path; I-16 can be accessed approximately one-half mile (0.8 km) northeast of the intersection. SR 86 parallels I-16 until just before an intersection with SR 46. The two highways form a concurrency for about 6 miles (9.7 km) to an intersection with US 1/SR 4 in Oak Park. Here, SR 46 diverges from SR 86. SR 86 travels through the city, on a former alignment of US 1/SR 4, before a four-lane bypass of the main part of Oak Park was built. At Harrington Street, SR 86 departs from the former path of US 1/SR 4 and takes a more southerly turn toward its eastern terminus. There are intersections with SR 152 and SR 292 in rural Toombs County. Finally, SR 86 meets its eastern terminus at an intersection with US 280/SR 30 halfway between Lyons and Reidsville. From there the roadway continues as Rose Hollow Road.

== History ==
State Route 160
- Location: Treutlen County
- Existed: 1940–1941

The roadway that would eventually become SR 86 was proposed between 1919 and the end of 1921. It was labeled as SR 17 as a "contingent road" in Oak Park. By the end of 1926, SR 17 and US 1 were designated on this same segment. By the end of 1929, SR 17 was shifted to a different alignment. Its former path was redesignated as part of SR 4. The next year, US 1 and SR 4 in Oak Park had a "completed hard surface". About seven years later, SR 46 was established just west of Oak Park. At the end of the year, this segment of SR 46 was under construction. By the end of 1939, it had a completed hard surface. A few months later, SR 160 was established from SR 78 in Blackville to SR 46 west of Oak Park. Later that year, SR 160's segment from south of Adrian to SR 56 northeast of Soperton had a completed hard surface. The eastern part of the highway was under construction.

By the end of 1941, all of SR 160 was redesignated as SR 86, with the portion from northeast of Soperton to west of Oak Park having a completed hard surface. By the end of 1946, SR 46's portion just west of Oak Park was shifted to the southern part of the city, since it then had a concurrency with US 1/SR 4. Between 1957 and the end of 1960, SR 322 was established from US 1/SR 4/SR 46 in Oak Park then south-southeast to SR 292 north of Ohoopee. By the end of 1963, an unnumbered road was established from SR 29 southeast of East Dublin to SR 15/SR 78 south of Adrian. Between 1963 and 1966 this road was designated as a western extension of SR 86. SR 322 was redesignated as an eastern extension of the highway, with a further extension south-southeast to US 280/SR 30 south-southeast of Ohoopee.

=== I-16 bridge incident ===
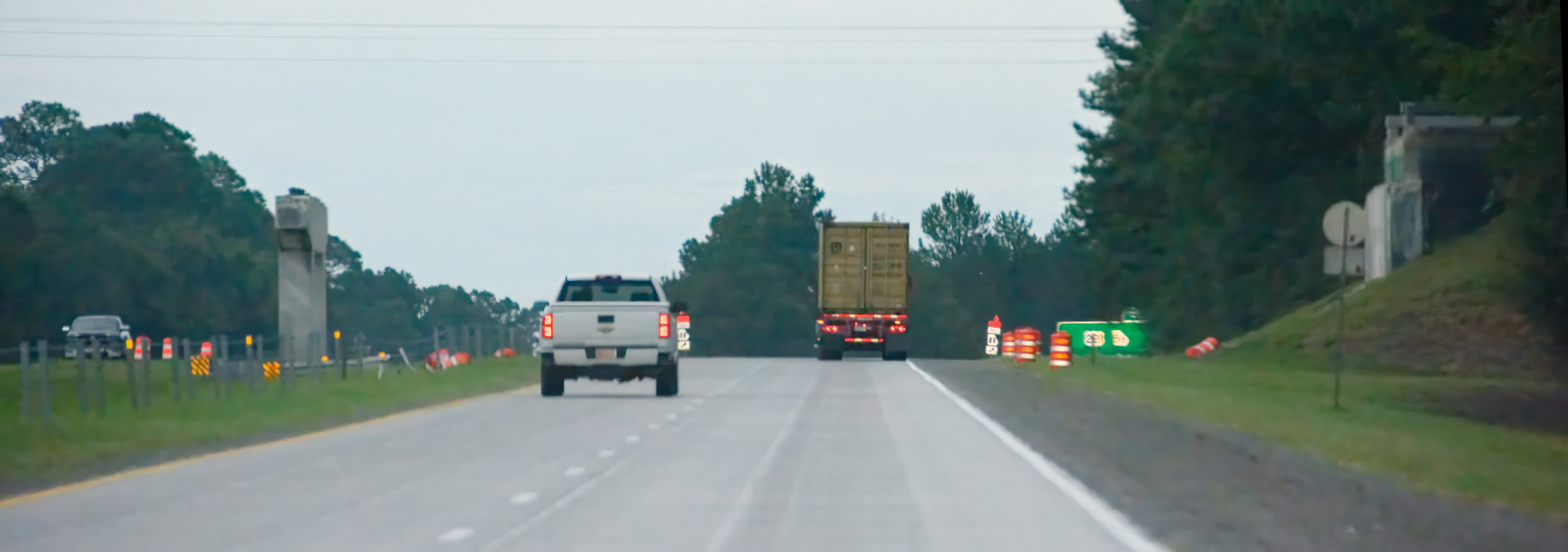
The missing bridge over I-16, facing east

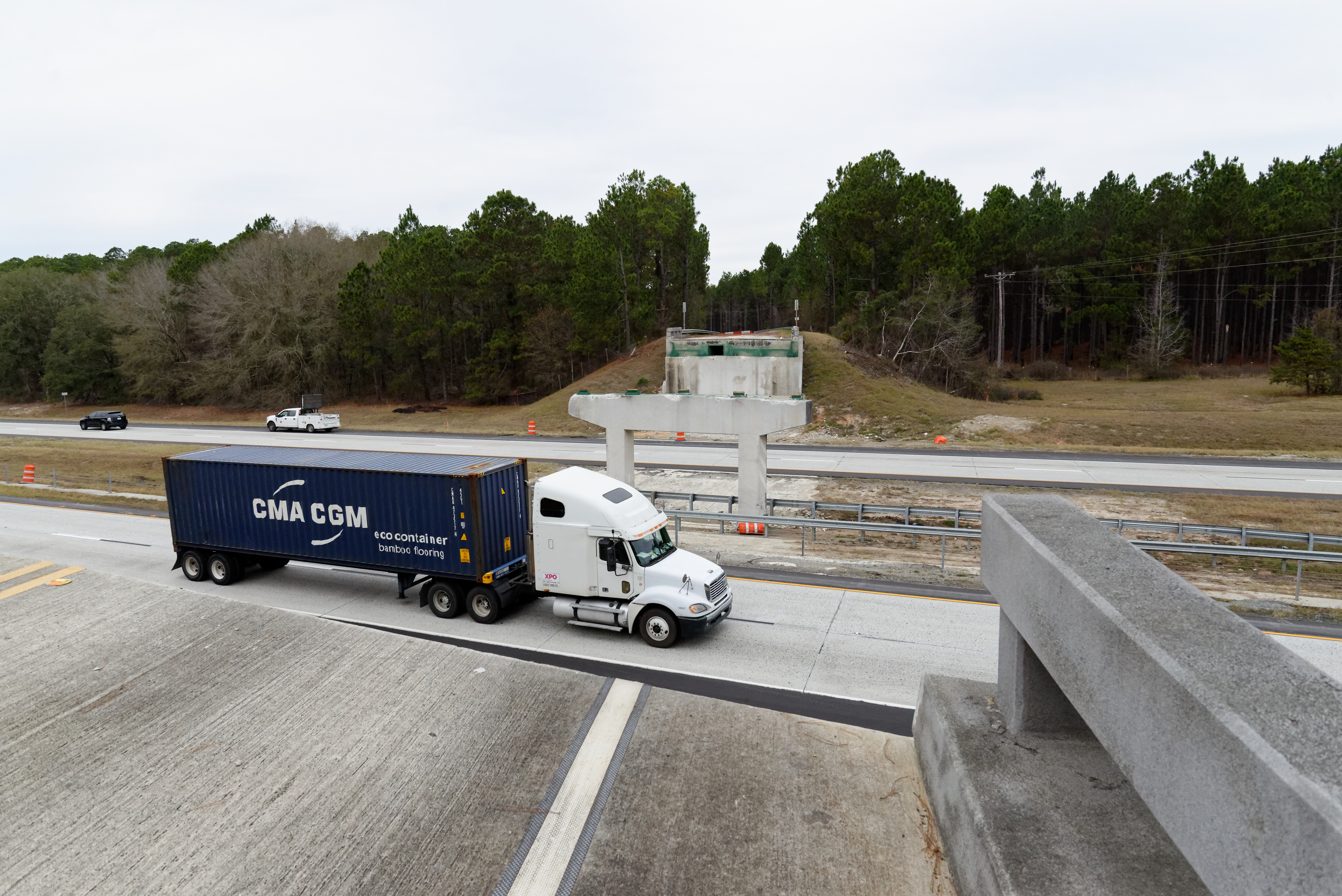
Facing north

The bridge carrying SR 86 over I-16, originally built in 1974, was severely damaged when the raised bed of a dump truck collided with the structure on the morning of July 15, 2021. The incident resulted in the loss of the bridge and extended closures along sections of SR 86 and, more critically, a section of I-16. The affected section carried an average of 21,000 vehicles per day at the time of the incident, while the affected section of SR 86 carried an average of 300 vehicles per day. I-16 was fully reopened within the day of the incident; however the extended loss of the SR 86 bridge significantly increased commutes for people who rely on the road. Bridge reconstruction began in January 2022, and the new overpass was opened to traffic by the end of July 2022.

== Major intersections ==
| County | Location | mi | km | Destinations | Notes |
|---|---|---|---|---|---|
| Laurens | | 0.0 | 0.0 | SR 29 – Soperton, East Dublin, Dublin | Western terminus |
| Treutlen | Blackville | 13.3 | 21.4 | SR 15 / SR 78 – Soperton, Adrian | |
| Treutlen | | 20.0 | 32.2 | US 221 / SR 56 – Soperton, Swainsboro | |
| Treutlen | | 26.9 | 43.3 | SR 46 west – Soperton | Western end of SR 46 concurrency |
| Emanuel | | 27.3 | 43.9 | SR 297 – Vidalia, Nunez | |
| Emanuel | Oak Park | 32.1 | 51.7 | US 1 / SR 4 / SR 46 east – Lyons, Swainsboro | Eastern end of SR 46 concurrency; former western end of US 1/SR 4 concurrency |
| Emanuel | Oak Park | 33.3 | 53.6 | Harrington Street south – Lyons | Former eastern end of US 1/SR 4 concurrency; former US 1 south/SR 4 south |
| Toombs | | 40.2 | 64.7 | SR 152 (New Cobbtown Road) – Lyons, Cobbtown | |
| Toombs | Ohoopee | 46.7 | 75.2 | SR 292 (6th Avenue) – Lyons, Collins | |
| Toombs | | 51.3 | 82.6 | US 280 (SR 30) / Rose Hollow Road south – Lyons, Reidsville | Eastern terminus of SR 86; northern terminus of Rose Hollow Road |
1.000 mi = 1.609 km; 1.000 km = 0.621 mi: Concurrency terminus
