= Georgia State Route 46 =

State highway in Georgia

State Route 46
- SR 46 highlighted in red

Route information
- Maintained by GDOT
- Length: 98.7 mi (158.8 km)

Major junctions
- West end: US 341 / US 341 Bus. / SR 27 / SR 27 Bus. west of Eastman
- US 23 / US 341 Bus. / SR 27 Bus. / SR 87 / SR 117 in Eastman; US 319 / US 441 / SR 31 northwest of Alamo; US 221 / SR 15 / SR 29 / SR 56 in Soperton; US 1 / SR 4 / SR 86 in Oak Park; I-16 in Oak Park; US 25 / US 301 / SR 73 southeast of Register; SR 67 near Denmark
- East end: I-16 / SR 67 near Denmark

Location
- Country: United States
- State: Georgia
- Counties: Dodge, Laurens, Wheeler, Treutlen, Emanuel, Candler, Bulloch

Highway system
- Georgia State Highway System; Interstate; US; State; Special
← SR 45	→ SR 47

State Route 46 (SR 46) is a 98.7-mile-long (158.8 km) state highway that travels west-to-east through portions of Dodge, Laurens, Wheeler, Treutlen, Emanuel, Candler, and Bulloch counties in the central part of the U.S. state of Georgia. The highway connects the Eastman area with the south-central part of Bulloch County. The highway closely parallels Interstate 16 (I-16) and serves local traffic.

== Route description ==
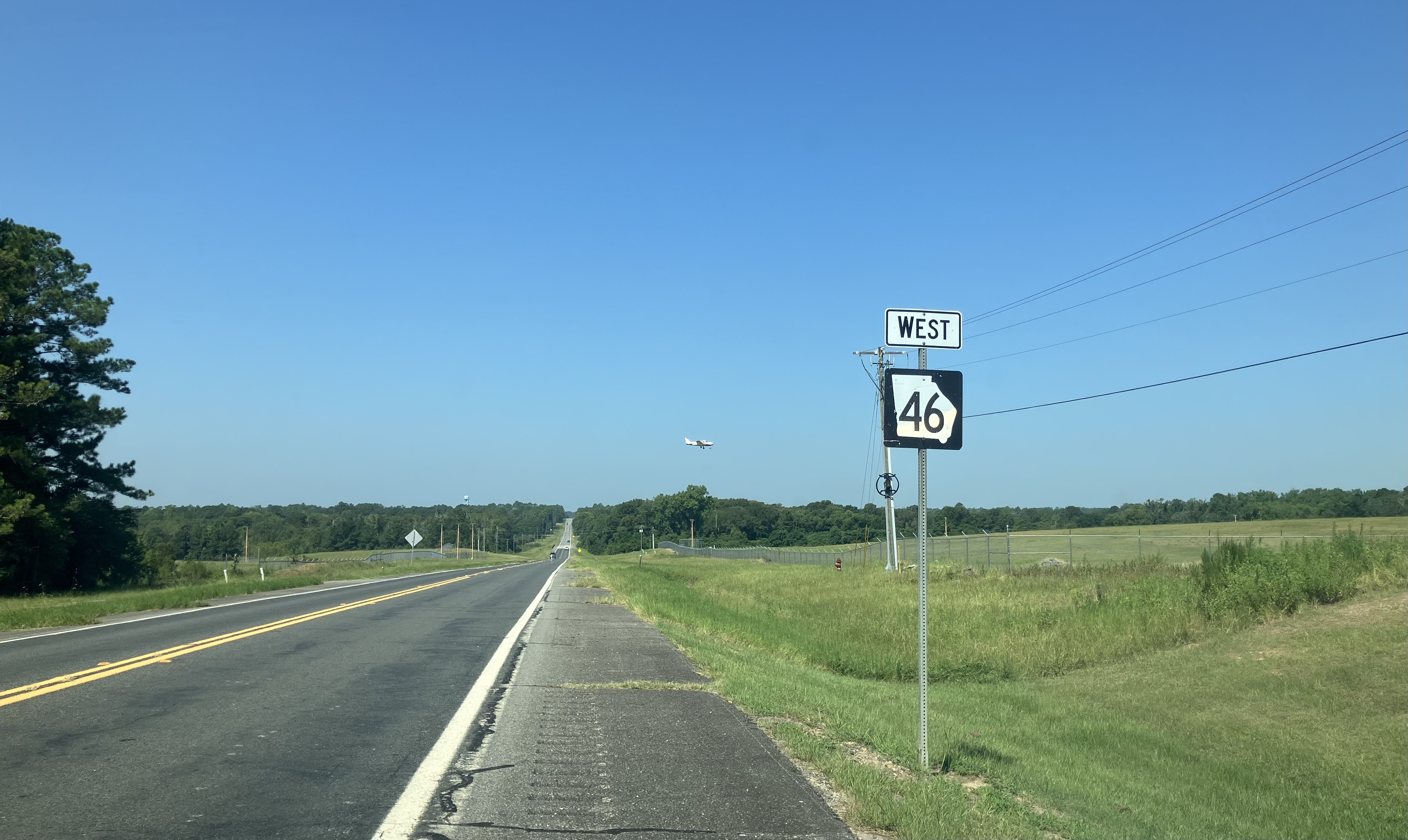
Georgia State Route 46 at Heart of Georgia Regional Airport

SR 46 begins at an intersection with US 341/SR 27 (Hawkinsville Highway), just west of Eastman, in Dodge County. This intersection also marks the northern terminus of US 341 Bus. and SR 27 Bus. These three highways head concurrently to the northeast for just over 1,000 feet (300 m), then curve to the east to enter Eastman. At Ogden Street, they head southeast for a short while, then turn left on 5th Avenue. About 1,500 feet (460 m) later, they intersect US 23/SR 87/SR 117 (Oak Street). Here, US 341 Bus./SR 27 Bus. depart to the southeast, while SR 117 travels concurrent with SR 46 for a few blocks. At Main Street, the two highways diverge. Page Street is the southern terminus of SR 46 Conn. SR 46 heads east-northeast, out of the city, passing Heart of Georgia Regional Airport. The highway travels through rural areas of the county and meets the northern terminus of SR 165 (Chauncey–Dublin Highway), before entering Laurens County. It continues to the northeast and intersects SR 126. The two highways head concurrently to the northeast past an intersection with US 319/US 441/SR 31, and then curve to the east-southeast. Less than 1 mile (1.6 km) later, SR 126 splits off to the southeast. SR 46 travels through rural areas of the county, cuts across a corner of Wheeler County and another corner of Laurens County, before re-entering Wheeler County. The highway curves to the northeast and intersects SR 19. Then, it crosses over the Oconee River into Treutlen County. A few miles later is an intersection with SR 199. In Soperton, it intersects SR 29 (West Main Street). Two blocks later is an intersection with SR 15/SR 78 (West Louisiana Avenue). After that, it curves to the east-northeast and intersects US 221/SR 56. Just before leaving town, SR 46 curves to the southeast. It passes the Treutlen County Airport. A few miles later, it meets the southern terminus of SR 227. The highway curves to the northeast and meets the western terminus of SR 298. The highway passes by Wildwood Lake and intersects SR 86, just before leaving the county. SR 46/SR 86 travel concurrently to the southeast and intersect SR 297 on the Treutlen–Emanuel county line. Just before entering Oak Park, the two highways curve to the east-northeast. In the city, they intersect US 1/SR 4 (Harrington Street). At this intersection, SR 86 follows US 1/SR 4 south into the main part of the city, while SR 46 follows US 1/SR 4 north through the northern parts of the city. They cross over the Ohoopee River and have an interchange with I-16 before SR 46 splits off and begins to parallel the interstate for the rest of its length. In fact, the two highways are never more than 3 miles (4.8 km) apart from each other. SR 46 leaves Oak Park and travels through rural areas of the county before entering Candler County. The highway travels through mostly rural areas for the rest of its length, with few exceptions. After an intersection with SR 57, it curves to the east-northeast and enters Metter. At College Street, SR 23 begins a concurrency for a few blocks. At Lewis Street is an intersection with SR 121. Here, SR 23 splits off to the south. One block later is the northern terminus of SR 129 (South Leroy Street). After the highway leaves Metter, it travels through Pulaski before entering Bulloch County. SR 46 travels through Register and intersects US 25/US 301/SR 73 less than 1 mile (1.6 km) later. It passes Hickman Pond and crosses through a portion of Eagle Creek Golf Course, which is just northeast of Kennedy Pond. The highway curves back to the southeast, resuming its close proximity to I-16. It reaches an intersection with SR 67, south-southeast of the unincorporated community of Denmark, and turns south to run concurrent with SR 67. A little over one mile later, the two highways cross over I-16 (exit 127), where SR 46 meets its eastern terminus as SR 67 continues to Pembroke.

The only portion of SR 46 that is part of the National Highway System, a system of routes determined to be the most important for the nation's economy, mobility, and defense, is the concurrency with US 1/SR 4 in Oak Park.

== History ==
At one point, SR 46 used to continue to US 80, just west of Blitchton in Bryan County. The portion of the highway between US 80 and SR 67, SR 46's current eastern terminus, was decommissioned in 1996 and currently serves as a county road. When SR 46 was shortened, it was moved to be briefly concurrent with SR 67 south to an interchange with I-16 where SR 46 ends, beyond the interchange SR 67 continues south.

== Major intersections ==
County	Location	mi	km	Destinations	Notes
Dodge	Eastman	0.0	0.0	US 341 / SR 27 (Hawkinsville Highway) / US 341 Bus. south / SR 27 Bus. south – McRae, Hawkinsville	Southern terminus of US 341 Bus./SR 27 Bus./SR 46; west end of US 341 Bus./SR 27 Bus. concurrency
Dodge	Eastman	2.0	3.2	US 341 Bus. south / SR 27 Bus. south (Oak Street) / US 23 / SR 87 / SR 117 south (Oak Street) – Hawkinsville, Cochran, Rhine	East end of US 341 Bus./SR 27 Bus. concurrency; west end of SR 117 concurrency
Dodge	Eastman	2.1	3.4	SR 117 north (Anson Avenue) – Cadwell	East end of SR 117 concurrency
Dodge	Eastman	2.4	3.9	SR 46 Conn. north (Page Street)	Southern terminus of SR 46 Conn.
Dodge		10.2	16.4	SR 165 south (Chauncey–Dublin Highway) – Chauncey	Northern terminus of SR 165
Laurens		15.6	25.1	SR 126 north – Cadwell	West end of SR 126 concurrency
Laurens		18.5	29.8	US 319 / US 441 / SR 31 – McRae, Dublin	
Laurens		19.8	31.9	SR 126 south – Alamo	East end of SR 126 concurrency
Wheeler	No major junctions				
Laurens	No major junctions				
Wheeler		30.0	48.3	SR 19 – Glenwood, Dublin	
Treutlen		36.8	59.2	SR 199 – Mt. Vernon, East Dublin	
Treutlen	Soperton	40.3	64.9	SR 29 (West Main Street) – Tarrytown, Rockledge	
Treutlen	Soperton	40.4	65.0	SR 15 / SR 78 (West Louisiana Avenue) – Tarrytown, Adrian	
Treutlen	Soperton	40.8	65.7	US 221 / SR 56 – Mt. Vernon, Swainsboro	
Treutlen		43.4	69.8	SR 227 north	Southern terminus of SR 227
Treutlen		45.8	73.7	SR 298 east	Western terminus of SR 298
Treutlen		52.0	83.7	SR 86 north	West end of SR 86 concurrency
Treutlen–Emanuel county line		52.5	84.5	SR 297 – Vidalia, Nunez	
Emanuel	Oak Park	57.3	92.2	SR 86 south	East end of SR 86 concurrency
Emanuel	Oak Park	57.4	92.4	US 1 south / SR 4 south – Lyons	West end of US 1/SR 4 concurrency
Emanuel	Oak Park	58.8	94.6	Unnamed bridge	Crossing over the Ohoopee River
Emanuel	Oak Park	59.5	95.8	I-16 (SR 404 / Jim Gillis Historic Savannah Parkway) – Macon, Savannah	I-16 exit 90
Emanuel	Oak Park	59.8	96.2	US 1 north / SR 4 north – Swainsboro	East end of US 1/SR 4 concurrency
Candler		68.3	109.9	SR 57 – Cobbtown, Stillmore	
Candler	Metter	74.5	119.9	SR 23 north (North College Street) – Twin City	West end of SR 23 concurrency
Candler	Metter	74.7	120.2	SR 23 south / SR 121 (Lewis Street) – Cobbtown, Millen	East end of SR 23 concurrency
Candler	Metter	74.8	120.4	SR 129 south (South Leroy Street) – Claxton	Northern terminus of SR 129
Bulloch		86.8	139.7	US 25 / US 301 / SR 73 – Claxton, Statesboro	
Bulloch		97.2	156.4	SR 67 north – Statesboro, Pembroke	West end of SR 67 concurrency
Bulloch		98.7	158.8	I-16 (SR 404 / Jim Gillis Historic Savannah Parkway) / SR 67 south – Macon, Savannah	Eastern terminus; east end of SR 67 concurrency; I-16 exit 127
1.000 mi = 1.609 km; 1.000 km = 0.621 mi: Concurrency terminus

== Eastman connector route ==
State Route 46 Connector
- Location: Eastman
- Length: 0.0765 mi (123.1 m)

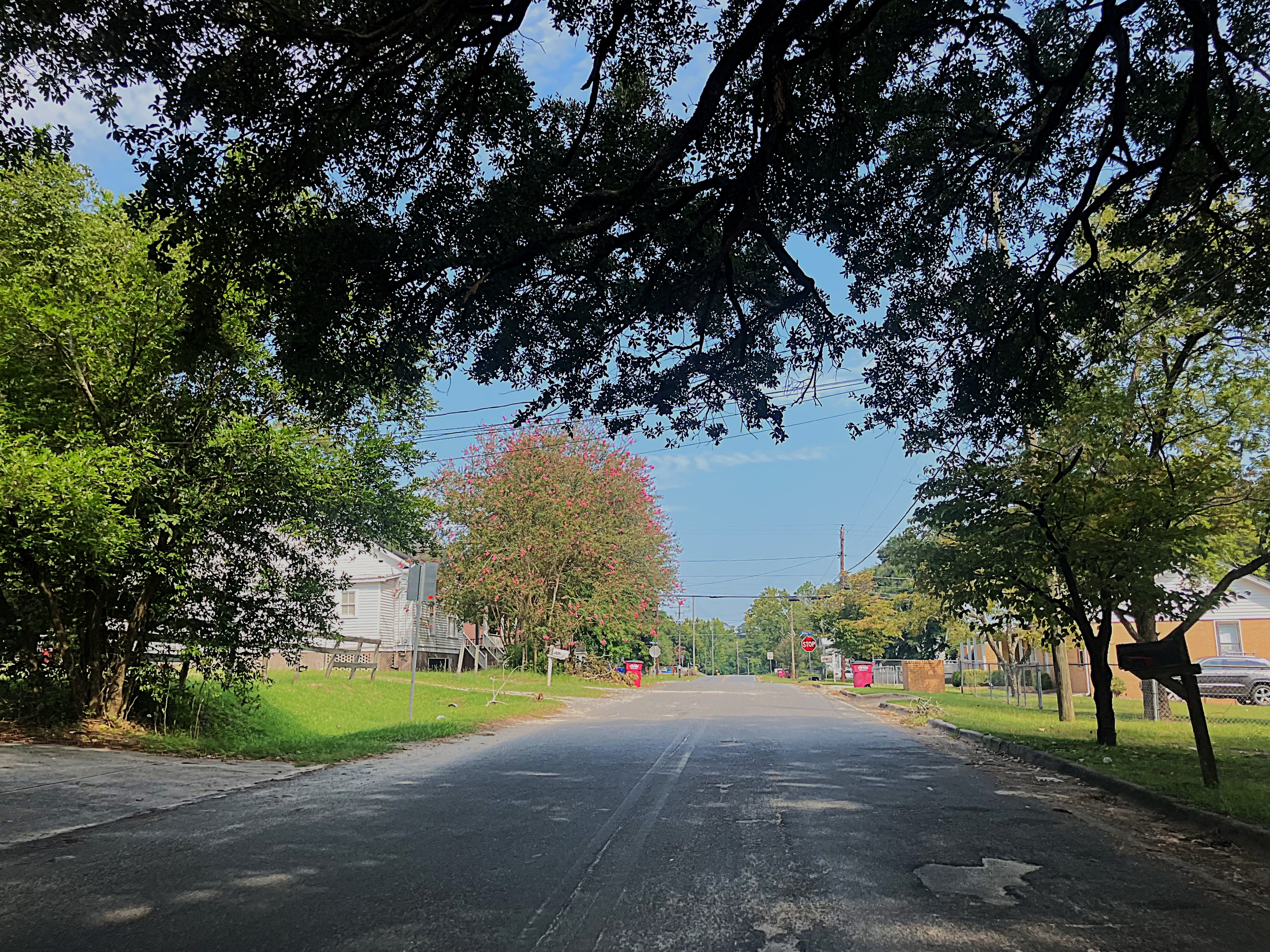
The entirety of SR 46 Conn. in Eastman

State Route 46 Connector (SR 46 Conn.) is a 404-foot-long (123 m) connector route that exists entirely within the central part of Dodge County. The route is completely inside the main part of the city limits of Eastman, and is known as Page Street for its entire length. It is an unsigned highway.

It begins at an intersection with the SR 46 mainline (5th Avenue), just northeast of the downtown part of Eastman. The highway heads northeast for one block until it meets its northern terminus, an intersection with SR 117 (Anson Avenue).

SR 46 Conn. is not part of the National Highway System, a system of roadways important to the nation's economy, defense, and mobility.

The entire route is in Eastman, Dodge County.

mi	km	Destinations	Notes
0.0000	0.0000	SR 46 (5th Avenue) – Soperton	Southern terminus
0.0765	0.1231	SR 117 (Anson Avenue) – Rhine, Cadwell	Northern terminus
1.000 mi = 1.609 km; 1.000 km = 0.621 mi
