= Georgia State Route 29 =

State highway in Georgia

State Route 29
- SR 29 highlighted in red

Route information
- Maintained by GDOT
- Length: 98.28 mi (158.17 km)
- Existed: 1919–present

Major junctions
- South end: US 1 / SR 4 / SR 15 in South Thompson
- US 280 / SR 30 in Vidalia; US 221 / SR 46 / SR 56 in Soperton; I-16 southeast of Rockledge; US 80 / US 319 / SR 26 / SR 31 in East Dublin; US 80 / US 319 / US 441 / SR 19 / SR 26 / SR 31 in Dublin; SR 540 near Scottsboro; US 441 Bus. / SR 29 Bus. in Scottsboro
- North end: US 441 / US 441 Bus. / SR 24 / SR 29 Bus. in Milledgeville

Location
- Country: United States
- State: Georgia
- Counties: Toombs, Montgomery, Treutlen, Laurens, Wilkinson, Baldwin

Highway system
- Georgia State Highway System; Interstate; US; State; Special
← US 29	→ SR 30

State Route 29 (SR 29) is a 98.28-mile-long (158.17 km) state highway that travels southeast-to-northwest through portions of Toombs, Montgomery, Treutlen, Laurens, Wilkinson, and Baldwin counties in the central part of the U.S. state of Georgia. The highway connects the Vidalia area with the Milledgeville area, via the Dublin area.

SR 29 was originally designated on a path from Jeffersonville to Irwinton and Milledgeville before being shifted to its current path. It was then extended to its southern terminus.

== Route description ==
SR 29 begins at an intersection with US 1/SR 4 in the unincorporated community of South Thompson, which is about 8 miles (13 km) south-southeast of the central part of Vidalia in Toombs County. At its southern terminus, it is concurrent with SR 15, which is concurrent with US 1/SR 4 south of this point. SR 15/SR 29 head northwest and curve to the north-northwest and enter Vidalia. In town, they curve to the northeast and intersect US 280/SR 30. The four highways travel concurrent to the northwest, intersect SR 130, and then curve to the west-southwest. Then, they enter Montgomery County right before leaving town. They travel north of Rocky Creek Golf Club and enter Higgston, where they meet the northern terminus of SR 135. At this intersection, SR 15/SR 29 depart the concurrency to the north-northwest. They meet the western terminus of SR 292 before leaving town. They travel through Tarrytown before entering Treutlen County. In Soperton, they intersect US 221/SR 56 (2nd Street). At this intersection, SR 15 turns to the right, onto US 221/SR 56 north. Two blocks later, they intersect SR 46. After that, SR 29 continues to the northwest and leaves town. It travels through rural areas of town and has an interchange with Interstate 16 (I-16) southeast of Rockledge. Just over 2,000 feet (610 m) later, it crosses over Mercer Creek into Laurens County. The highway travels through Rockledge and meets the western terminus of SR 86. Then, it enters East Dublin, where it first meets the northern terminus of SR 199 (Coleman Avenue). In the main part of town, it intersects US 80/SR 26 (Savannah Avenue). The three highways begin a concurrency to the northwest. Approximately 500 feet (150 m) later, US 319/SR 31 (Wrightsville Avenue) join the concurrency. They head west-northwest and then curve to the southwest. They cross over the Oconee River on the Herschel Lovett Bridge into Dublin. At Jefferson Street, the concurrency intersects US 441. Here, SR 29 departs the concurrency to the north-northwest, concurrent with US 441. The two highways head to the northwest and meet the northern terminus of US 441 Byp./SR 117. Then, they meet the northern terminus of SR 338 before entering Wilkinson County. In Nicklesville, they intersect SR 112. The two highways begin to curve to the north-northwest and meet the eastern terminus of SR 96. After that, they travel to the west of Bearcamp Lake and enter Irwinton. There, they intersect SR 57 (Main Street). Then, they travel through McIntyre. They have an interchange with SR 540 (Fall Line Freeway) before entering Baldwin County. In Scottsboro is an intersection with SR 243. This intersection also marks the southern terminus of US 441 Bus. US 441/SR 29 act as a bypass of the main part of Milledgeville. At an intersection with SR 49 (West Hancock Street), they enter the city limits of Milledgeville and travel through the western part of the city. Then, they intersect SR 22 (Glynn Street). Next to Hatcher Square Mall they intersect US 441 Bus./SR 24 (North Columbia Street). This intersection marks the northern terminus of both US 441 Bus. and SR 29.

The following segments of SR 29 are included as part of the National Highway System, a system of routes determined to be the most important for the nation's economy, mobility, and defense:

- From the southern terminus to Soperton
- From the intersection with US 441 Byp./SR 117 northwest of Dublin to Milledgeville

== History ==
SR 29 was established at least as early as 1919 on a path from Jeffersonville northeast to Irwinton and then north-northwest to Milledgeville. At this time, an unnumbered road was established on the current path of SR 29 from Dublin north-northwest to Irwinton. By the end of September 1921, the portion from Jeffersonville to Irwinton was shifted eastward onto the previously unnumbered road.

In January 1932, the highway was extended east-northeast on US 80/SR 15/SR 26 to North Dublin and then southeast to US 1/SR 4 in South Thompson. About five years later, the path of SR 29 in the Vidalia area was slightly shifted westward, onto a concurrency with US 280/SR 30 from Vidalia to Higgston.

In 1942, the entire length of SR 29 had a "completed hard surface". Between January 1945 and November 1946, US 319 was designated on the path of SR 29 from North Dublin and Dublin. Between February 1948 and April 1949, US 441 was designated on it from Dublin to Milledgeville.

Between July 1957 and June 1960, the path of SR 15 was shifted eastward, off of the North Dublin–Dublin segment, to travel concurrently with SR 29 from South Thompson to Soperton. Its former path, on SR 29, was redesignated as SR 31. Between June 1963 and January 1966, US 441/SR 29 was indicated to enter Milledgeville on Wayne Street. SR 29 ended at the intersection with SR 22/SR 24 (Hancock Street). US 441 turned left and continued to the west-southwest on SR 22/SR 24.

In 1971, the path of SR 29 in Milledgeville was shifted west a few blocks, off of US 441 (Wayne Street north of Franklin Street) and onto Franklin Street west-southwest to Clarke Street and then north-northwest on Clarke Street to US 441 and the northern terminus of SR 49.

In 1985, the path of US 441 in Milledgeville, on Wayne Street north of Franklin Street, and on Hancock Street, was shifted southwestward, onto SR 29 (Franklin and Clarke streets). In 1989, the path of US 441/SR 29 in Milledgeville was shifted westward, onto a bypass of the city. The former path of SR 29 was redesignated as US 441 Bus. and a northern extension of SR 243.

== Major intersections ==
County	Location	mi	km	Destinations	Notes
Toombs	South Thompson	0.000	0.000	US 1 / SR 4 / SR 15 south	Southern terminus; southern end of SR 15 concurrency
Toombs	Vidalia	8.450	13.599	US 280 east / SR 30 east (1st Street)	Southern end of US 280 east/SR 30 east concurrency; eastbound lanes of US 280/SR 30 on one-way pairs
Toombs	Vidalia	8.966	14.429	US 280 west / SR 30 west (Main Street)	Northern end of US 280 east/SR 30 east concurrency; southern end of US 280 west/SR 30 west concurrency; westbound lanes of US 280/SR 30 on one-way pairs
Toombs	Vidalia	9.729	15.657	SR 130 (Adams Street / Montgomery Street) – Uvalda	No access to SR 130 from US 280 west/SR 15 north/SR 29 north/SR 30 west or vice versa
Montgomery	Higgston	12.773	20.556	US 280 west / SR 30 west / SR 135 south – Mount Vernon, Uvalda	Northern end of US 280/SR 30 concurrency; northern terminus of SR 135
Montgomery	Higgston	13.542	21.794	SR 292 east – Vidalia	Western terminus of SR 292
Treutlen	Soperton	26.832	43.182	US 221 / SR 56 / SR 15 north (2nd Street) – Mount Vernon, Swainsboro, Adrian	Northern end of SR 15 concurrency
Treutlen	Soperton	26.975	43.412	SR 46 (Eastman Road / Metter Road) – Eastman, Oak Park	
Treutlen		33.459	53.847	I-16 (SR 404 / Jim L. Gillis Historic Savannah Parkway) – Macon, Savannah	I-16/SR 404 exit 67
Mercer Creek		34.181	55.009	Unnamed bridge over Mercer Creek, marking the Treutlen–Laurens county line	
Laurens		42.993	69.191	SR 86 east (Old Savannah Road) – Oak Park	Western terminus of SR 86
Laurens	East Dublin	46.444	74.744	SR 199 south (Coleman Avenue) – Mount Vernon	Northern terminus of SR 199
Laurens	East Dublin	47.152	75.884	US 80 east / SR 26 east (Savannah Avenue) – Swainsboro	Southern end of US 80/SR 26 concurrency
Laurens	East Dublin	47.239	76.024	US 319 north / SR 31 north (Wrightsville Avenue) – Wrightsville	Southern end of US 319/SR 31 concurrency
Laurens	East Dublin–Dublin line	48.584	78.188	Herschel Lovett Bridge over the Oconee River	
Laurens	Dublin	49.122	79.054	US 319 south / SR 31 south (Washington Street) – McRae	Northern end of US 319/SR 31 concurrency
Laurens	Dublin	49.320	79.373	US 80 west / SR 19 west / SR 26 / US 441 south – Macon, Cochran, McRae	Northern end of US 80/SR 26 concurrency; southern end of US 441 concurrency
Laurens		54.318	87.416	US 441 Byp. south / SR 117 south	Northern terminus of US 441 Byp. and SR 117
Laurens		57.159	91.988	SR 338 south – Dudley	Northern terminus of SR 338
Wilkinson	Nicklesville	64.380	103.610	SR 112 – Allentown, Toomsboro	
Wilkinson		70.210	112.992	SR 96 west – Jeffersonville	Eastern terminus of SR 96
Wilkinson	Irwinton	75.586	121.644	SR 57 (West Main Street) – Macon, Wrightsville	
Wilkinson		87.909	141.476	SR 540 (Fall Line Freeway) – Ivey, Gordon, Augusta, Macon	Interchange
Baldwin	Scottsboro	91.385	147.070	US 441 Bus. north / SR 29 Bus. north / Gordon Highway SW – Milledgeville	Southern terminus of US 441 Bus. and SR 29 Bus.; former SR 243
Baldwin	Milledgeville	95.385	153.507	SR 49 (West Hancock Street) – Macon	
Baldwin	Milledgeville	97.211	156.446	SR 22 / SR 212 west (Glynn Street) – Gray, Macon, Milledgeville, Central Georgia Technical College	Eastern terminus of SR 212; SR 22 east provides access to Navicent Health Baldwin
Baldwin	Milledgeville	98.280	158.166	US 441 north / US 441 Bus. south / SR 24 / SR 29 Bus. south (North Columbia Street) / Dunlap Road east – Eatonton, Sandersville	Northern terminus; northern end of US 441 concurrency; northern terminus of US 441 Bus., SR 29, and SR 29 Bus.; western terminus of Dunlap Road
1.000 mi = 1.609 km; 1.000 km = 0.621 mi: Concurrency terminus; Incomplete access

== Special routes ==
=== Milledgeville business loop ===
State Route 29 Business
- Location: Scottsboro–Milledgeville
- Length: 7.1 mi (11.4 km)
- Existed: 2016–present

State Route 29 Business (SR 29 Bus.) is a business route of SR 29 that exists in Scottsboro and Milledgeville. It is entirely concurrent with U.S. Route 441 Business (US 441 Bus.). Most of its path was formerly signed as part of SR 243. SR 29 Bus. was designated in 2016.

=== Milledgeville spur route ===
State Route 29 Spur
- Location: Milledgeville
- Existed: 1946–1960

State Route 29 Spur (SR 29 Spur) was a spur route of SR 29 that existed in the southern part of Milledgeville. Between January 1945 and November 1946, it was established on the northern part of Vinson Highway, from the southern part of Vinson Highway in the southeastern part of the city north-northwest and northwest to US 441/SR 29 (Wayne Street) in the southern part of the city. Between July 1957 and June 1960, it was redesignated as SR 112 Spur. The southern part of Vinson Highway was designated as part of SR 112.

The entire route was in Milledgeville, Baldwin County.

mi	km	Destinations	Notes
		Vinson Highway south	Southern terminus; Vinson Highway continues past terminus.
		US 441 / SR 29 (Wayne Street)	Northern terminus
1.000 mi = 1.609 km; 1.000 km = 0.621 mi
