= Toombs County, Georgia =

County in Georgia, United States

- County
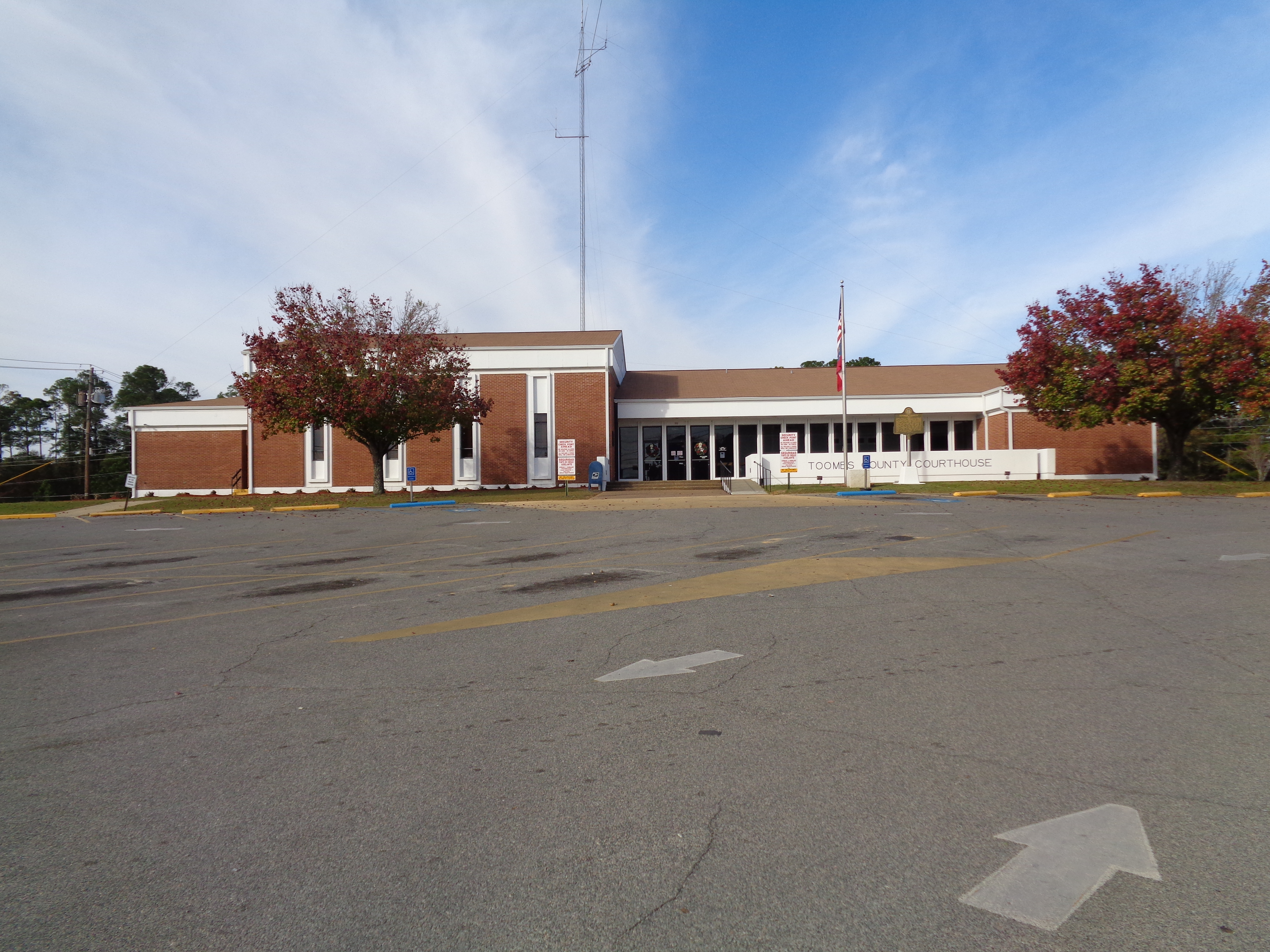
- Former Toombs County Courthouse in Lyons

- Location within the U.S. state of Georgia
- Coordinates: 32°07′N 82°20′W
- Country: United States
- State: Georgia
- Founded: August 18, 1905; 121 years ago
- Named for: Robert Toombs
- Seat: Lyons
- Largest city: Vidalia

Area
  - Total: 371 sq mi (960 km^{2})
  - Land: 364 sq mi (940 km^{2})
  - Water: 7.0 sq mi (18 km^{2}) 1.9%

Population (2020)
  - Total: 27,030
  - Estimate (2025): 27,545 ▲
  - Density: 74/sq mi (29/km^{2})
- Time zone: UTC−5 (Eastern)
  - Summer (DST): UTC−4 (EDT)
- Congressional district: 12th
- Website: www.toombscountyga.gov

Toombs County is a county located in the southern portion of the U.S. state of Georgia. As of the 2020 census, the population was 27,030. The county seat is Lyons and the largest city is Vidalia. The county was created on August 18, 1905.

Toombs County is part of the Vidalia micropolitan statistical area.

== History ==
Toombs County was founded as the 144th county in Georgia by the State Legislature on August 18, 1905, and organized on October 9 of that year. The county was originally formed from portions of Tattnall and Montgomery Counties; a small piece of Emanuel County was added in 1907 to give Toombs County its present-day boundaries.

The county is named for Robert Toombs, a United States representative, senator, and eventual Secretary of State for the Confederacy.

== Geography ==
According to the U.S. Census Bureau, the county has a total area of 371 square miles (960 km^{2}), of which 364 square miles (940 km^{2}) is land and 7.0 square miles (18 km^{2}) (1.9%) is water.

The southern half of Toombs County, from south of Vidalia southeast to State Route 147, is located in the Altamaha River sub-basin of the larger river basin by the same name. The northern half of the county, centered on Lyons, is located in the Ohoopee River sub-basin of the Altamaha River basin.

=== Major highways ===
- U.S. Route 1 / State Route 4
- U.S. Route 280 / State Route 30
- State Route 15
- State Route 29
- State Route 56
- State Route 86
- State Route 130
- State Route 147
- State Route 152
- State Route 178
- State Route 292
- State Route 297
- State Route 298

=== Adjacent counties ===
- Emanuel County (north)
- Tattnall County (east)
- Appling County (south)
- Jeff Davis County (southwest)
- Montgomery County (west)
- Treutlen County (northwest)
- Candler County (northeast)

== Communities ==
=== Cities ===
- Lyons (county seat)
- Santa Claus
- Vidalia

=== Census-designated place ===
- Ohoopee

=== Unincorporated Communities ===
- Center
- English Eddy
- Grays Landing
- Johnson Corner
- McNatt Falls
- Normantown
- South Thompson

== Demographics ==
Historical population
Census	Pop.	Note	%±
1910	11,206		—
1920	13,897		24.0%
1930	17,165		23.5%
1940	16,952		−1.2%
1950	17,382		2.5%
1960	16,837		−3.1%
1970	19,151		13.7%
1980	22,592		18.0%
1990	24,072		6.6%
2000	26,067		8.3%
2010	27,223		4.4%
2020	27,030		−0.7%
2025 (est.)	27,545	▲	1.9%
U.S. Decennial Census; 1790-1880 1890-1910; 1920-1930 1930-1940; 1940-1950 1960-1980; 1980-2000 2010

=== Racial and ethnic composition ===
Toombs County, Georgia – Racial and ethnic composition Note: the US Census treats Hispanic/Latino as an ethnic category. This table excludes Latinos from the racial categories and assigns them to a separate category. Hispanics/Latinos may be of any race.
Race / Ethnicity (NH = Non-Hispanic)	Pop 1980	Pop 1990	Pop 2000	Pop 2010	Pop 2020	% 1980	% 1990	% 2000	% 2010	% 2020
White alone (NH)	16,656	17,446	17,226	16,887	16,007	73.73%	72.47%	66.08%	62.03%	59.22%
Black or African American alone (NH)	5,668	5,621	6,237	6,716	6,980	25.09%	23.35%	23.93%	24.67%	25.82%
Native American or Alaska Native alone (NH)	26	34	44	37	31	0.12%	0.14%	0.17%	0.14%	0.11%
Asian alone (NH)	56	139	119	199	207	0.25%	0.58%	0.46%	0.73%	0.77%
Native Hawaiian or Pacific Islander alone (NH)	x	x	0	14	6	x	x	0.00%	0.05%	0.02%
Other race alone (NH)	11	8	5	42	79	0.05%	0.03%	0.02%	0.15%	0.29%
Mixed race or Multiracial (NH)	x	x	126	273	676	x	x	0.48%	1.00%	2.50%
Hispanic or Latino (any race)	175	824	2,310	3,055	3,044	0.77%	3.42%	8.86%	11.22%	11.26%
Total	22,592	24,072	26,067	27,223	27,030	100.00%	100.00%	100.00%	100.00%	100.00%

=== 2020 census ===
As of the 2020 census, the county had a population of 27,030 people, 10,505 households, and 6,537 families residing within its borders.

The median age was 39.0 years, 25.0% of residents were under the age of 18, and 18.2% were 65 years of age or older; for every 100 females there were 91.3 males, and for every 100 females age 18 and over there were 86.7 males age 18 and over. 50.3% of residents lived in urban areas while 49.7% lived in rural areas.

The racial makeup of the county was 61.3% White, 26.0% Black or African American, 0.4% American Indian and Alaska Native, 0.8% Asian, 0.0% Native Hawaiian and Pacific Islander, 6.5% from some other race, and 5.1% from two or more races; Hispanic or Latino residents of any race comprised 11.3% of the population.

There were 10,505 households, of which 32.2% had children under the age of 18 living with them and 34.1% had a female householder with no spouse or partner present; about 28.5% of all households were made up of individuals and 13.3% had someone living alone who was 65 years of age or older.

There were 12,027 housing units, of which 12.7% were vacant. Among occupied housing units, 59.3% were owner-occupied and 40.7% were renter-occupied; the homeowner vacancy rate was 1.5% and the rental vacancy rate was 9.5%.

== Government ==
Toombs County is governed by a five-member Board of Commissioners, headed by David Sikes, the chairman. Alvie Kight Jr. is the County Sheriff, since 1997.

=== Politics ===
As of the 2020s, Toombs County is a Republican stronghold, voting 75% for Donald Trump in 2024. For elections to the United States House of Representatives, Toombs County is part of Georgia's 12th congressional district, currently represented by Rick Allen. For elections to the Georgia State Senate, Toombs County is part of District 19. For elections to the Georgia House of Representatives, Toombs County is part of District 156.

United States presidential election results for Toombs County, Georgia
Year	Republican		Democratic		Third party(ies)	
Year	No.	%	No.	%	No.	%
1912	20	4.74%	327	77.49%	75	17.77%
1916	33	6.07%	425	78.13%	86	15.81%
1920	246	38.26%	397	61.74%	0	0.00%
1924	32	8.47%	314	83.07%	32	8.47%
1928	551	47.26%	615	52.74%	0	0.00%
1932	54	2.79%	1,868	96.49%	14	0.72%
1936	78	7.20%	1,001	92.43%	4	0.37%
1940	134	11.21%	1,061	88.79%	0	0.00%
1944	237	11.49%	1,825	88.51%	0	0.00%
1948	193	9.57%	1,161	57.59%	662	32.84%
1952	723	21.49%	2,641	78.51%	0	0.00%
1956	565	19.07%	2,397	80.93%	0	0.00%
1960	1,038	31.97%	2,209	68.03%	0	0.00%
1964	3,543	67.77%	1,685	32.23%	0	0.00%
1968	1,397	24.52%	896	15.72%	3,405	59.76%
1972	4,080	85.80%	675	14.20%	0	0.00%
1976	2,126	34.44%	4,047	65.56%	0	0.00%
1980	2,835	45.75%	3,255	52.53%	107	1.73%
1984	4,470	65.21%	2,385	34.79%	0	0.00%
1988	4,433	78.89%	1,152	20.50%	34	0.61%
1992	3,609	48.18%	2,648	35.35%	1,233	16.46%
1996	3,646	51.81%	2,763	39.26%	628	8.92%
2000	4,487	62.23%	2,643	36.66%	80	1.11%
2004	6,196	70.25%	2,567	29.10%	57	0.65%
2008	6,658	68.61%	2,964	30.54%	82	0.85%
2012	6,524	69.72%	2,746	29.35%	87	0.93%
2016	6,615	72.39%	2,338	25.59%	185	2.02%
2020	7,873	72.14%	2,938	26.92%	103	0.94%
2024	8,208	75.22%	2,674	24.51%	30	0.27%

United States Senate election results for Toombs County, Georgia2
Year	Republican		Democratic		Third party(ies)	
Year	No.	%	No.	%	No.	%
2020	7,793	72.17%	2,832	26.23%	173	1.60%
2020	6,877	73.25%	2,511	26.75%	0	0.00%

United States Senate election results for Toombs County, Georgia3
Year	Republican		Democratic		Third party(ies)	
Year	No.	%	No.	%	No.	%
2020	3,503	32.90%	1,760	16.53%	5,384	50.57%
2020	7,872	72.81%	2,939	27.19%	0	0.00%
2022	6,298	74.44%	2,062	24.37%	100	1.18%
2022	5,780	74.56%	1,972	25.44%	0	0.00%

Georgia Gubernatorial election results for Toombs County
Year	Republican		Democratic		Third party(ies)	
Year	No.	%	No.	%	No.	%
2022	6,522	76.86%	1,920	22.63%	44	0.52%

== Education ==
The Toombs County School District has five schools, including the Toombs County High School.

== Notable people ==
- Mel Blount (football hall of famer and founder of Mel Blount Youth Home)
- Nick Eason (former NFL player and current NFL assistant defensive line coach)
- Craig Campbell (country music singer)
- Fred Stokes (former pro football player)
- Travares Tillman (professional football player)
- Don Collins (former professional baseball player)
- Paul Claxton (PGA tour professional golfer)
- Wally Moses (former professional baseball player)
- Algur H. Meadows (oilman, businessman)
- Iris Blitch (politician)
- Carl Simpson (former professional baseball player)
- Don Harris (journalist killed during Jonestown Massacre)
- Ben Utt (professional football player)
- Paul Anderson (strongest man)

== See also ==
- National Register of Historic Places listings in Toombs County, Georgia
- List of counties in Georgia
