= Georgia State Route 57 =

State highway in Georgia, United States

State Route 57
- SR 57 highlighted in red

Route information
- Maintained by GDOT
- Length: 178.5 mi (287.3 km)

Major junctions
- West end: US 80 / SR 19 / SR 540 in East Macon
- US 441 / SR 29 in Irwinton; US 221 / SR 171 in Kite; US 80 / SR 26 / SR 56 in Swainsboro; US 80 / SR 26 / SR 56 in Swainsboro; US 1 / US 1 Bus. / SR 4 / SR 4 Bus. southeast of Swainsboro; I-16 southeast of Stillmore; US 280 / SR 30 in Reidsville; US 25 / US 301 / SR 73 / SR 144 in Glennville; US 25 / US 301 / SR 23; US 84 / SR 38 in Ludowici
- East end: I-95 / SR 99 west of Eulonia

Location
- Country: United States
- State: Georgia
- Counties: Bibb, Jones, Twiggs, Wilkinson, Washington, Johnson, Emanuel, Candler, Tattnall, Long, McIntosh

Highway system
- Georgia State Highway System; Interstate; US; State; Special
← SR 56	→ SR 58

State Route 57 (SR 57) is a 178.5-mile-long (287.3 km) state highway that travels northwest-to-southeast through portions of Bibb, Jones, Twiggs, Wilkinson, Washington, Johnson, Emanuel, Candler, Tattnall, Long, and McIntosh counties in the central and southeastern parts of the U.S. state of Georgia. The route connects the eastern part of the Macon area to the Eulonia area, via Swainsboro, Reidsville, & Glennville.

The portion from US 80/SR 19 in East Macon to former SR 243 southwest of Gordon is part of the Fall Line Freeway, a highway that connects Columbus and Augusta. It may also be incorporated into the proposed eastern extension of Interstate 14 (I-14), which is currently entirely within Central Texas and may eventually be extended into Augusta.

== Route description ==
=== Northern terminus to Swainsboro ===
SR 57 begins at an intersection with US 80/SR 19 (Jeffersonville Road), in East Macon in Bibb County. At this intersection, it also starts a concurrency with SR 540. SR 57 and SR 540 travel east, through rural areas of the county, before cutting across the southern corner of Jones County and entering Twiggs County. In Twiggs County, the highways travel through rural areas of the county before entering Wilkinson County. Southwest of Gordon, they intersect the western terminus of former SR 243. Here, SR 540 departs the concurrency. South-southwest of the city is an intersection with SR 18 (Gordon Road). To the east-southeast, in Irwinton, is an intersection with US 441/SR 29. It heads east, into Toomsboro, where it intersects SR 112 (Main Street). The road continues to the southeast, in a curving fashion, and crosses over the Oconee River into the southwestern corner of Washington County. Before entering Johnson County, it intersects SR 68 (Balls Ferry Road). It travels through rural areas of Johnson County until it enters Wrightsville. There, it intersects SR 15 (North Marcus Street). The two highways travel concurrently to the south. Almost immediately, they intersect US 319/SR 31/SR 78 (Elm Street). At this intersection, SR 31 travels concurrently with US 319 south of the city, while SR 78 travels concurrently north of the city. SR 15/SR 57/SR 78 head south for one block, where SR 57 departs to the east, on East College Street. It curves to the east-southeast and travels through rural areas of the county. Then, it enters the town of Kite, where it intersects US 221/SR 171 (Montgomery Street). After that, it enters Emanuel County. The highway heads southeast and meets US 1/SR 4, just before entering Swainsboro. Immediately afterward, it passes the Emanuel County Airport, Watson Lake, and the northeasternmost corner of Swainsboro Golf & Country Club. Approximately 4,000 feet (1,200 m) later, the highway intersects US 80/SR 26 (West Main Street) and SR 56 (Tyson Street). The four highways head concurrently to the northwest. At the intersection with US 1 Business/SR 4 Business (North Main Street), US 80/SR 26/SR 56 continue to the northeast, while US 1 Business/SR 4 Business/SR 57 head southeast and leave the city limits.

=== Southeast of Swainsboro ===
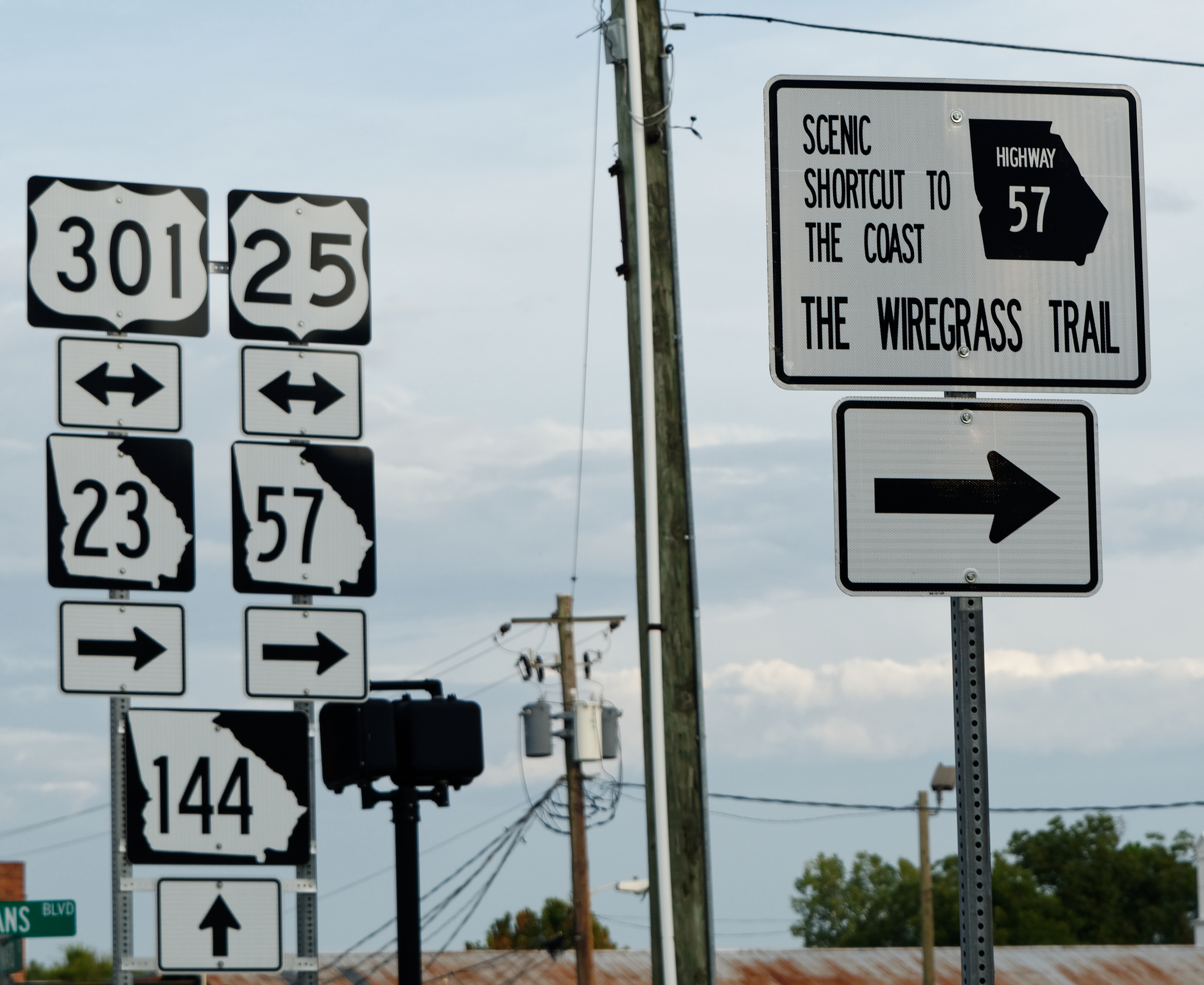
Wiregrass trail sign

At the intersection with US 1/SR 4 (South Main Street), US 1 Business/SR 4 Business end, and US 1/SR 4/SR 57 head southeast. About 2,000 feet (610 m) later is the northern terminus of SR 297. A short distance later, SR 57 departs to continue its southeasterly routing. In the town of Stillmore, it intersects SR 192 (4th Avenue). Less than 2 miles (3.2 km) later, the route crosses into Candler County. Shortly after the county line, it has an interchange with Interstate 16 (I-16; James L. Gillis Memorial Highway). Just after the interchange, the route passes through the unincorporated community of Aline, before entering Tattnall County. In Cobbtown, it begins a concurrency with SR 23/SR 121. In the central part of town, it meets the eastern terminus of SR 152 (New Cobbtown Road). The concurrency heads south-southeast and curves to the south-southwest into Collins, There they meet SR 292 (Manassas Street). The concurrency heads south and curves to the southeast to enter Reidsville. In town they meet US 280/SR 30 (Brazell Street). The three routes continues to the southeast, until SR 121 splits off to the south, at a point northwest of Hughland. In Lynn is SR 169. In Glennville, SR 144 (Hencart Road) joins the concurrency for a short while. Farther to the east, in the main part of town, is US 25/US 301/SR 73 (Veterans Boulevard). At this intersection, SR 73 meets its southern terminus, SR 144 continues to the east, and US 25/US 301/SR 23/SR 57 head to the south-southwest. Just outside the city limits is the western terminus of SR 196 (Baxter–Durrence Road). The concurrent routes cross over Beards Creek, into Long County. They pass through rural areas of the county and enter Ludowici. There, they intersect US 84/SR 38 (Cypress Street). At this intersection, US 25/US 301/SR 23 turn right to follow US 84/SR 38 west out of town, while SR 57 continues its southeasterly routing. It passes through rural areas of the county, before entering McIntosh County. In Townsend, it intersects the northern terminus of SR 251 (Briardam Road). The route continues to the east for a few mile and curves to the southeast, until it meets its eastern terminus, an interchange with I-95 west of Eulonia. Here, the roadway continues as SR 99.

=== National Highway System ===
The following portions of SR 57 are part of the National Highway System, a system of routes determined to be the most important for the nation's economy, mobility, and defense:

- From its western terminus in East Macon to the eastern end of the SR 540 concurrency, southwest of Gordon
- The entire length of the US 1/SR 4 concurrency, from just northwest of Swainsboro to a point south-southeast of the city.

== Major intersections ==
County	Location	mi	km	Destinations	Notes
Bibb		0.0	0.0	US 80 / SR 19 (Jeffersonville Road) / SR 540 west (Fall Line Freeway)	Western end of SR 540 concurrency; western terminus
Jones	No major junctions				
Twiggs	No major junctions				
Wilkinson		10.6	17.1	SR 540 east (Fall Line Freeway) / Maddox Road west – Milledgeville	Western end of SR 540 concurrency; former southern terminus of former SR 243
Wilkinson		12.6	20.3	SR 18 (Gordon Road) – Jeffersonville, Gordon	
Wilkinson	Irwinton	23.6	38.0	US 441 / SR 29	
Wilkinson	Toomsboro	30.3	48.8	SR 112 (Main Street) – Allentown, Milledgeville	
Oconee River		38.5	62.0	Wilkinson–Washington county line	
Washington	Veal	40.4	65.0	SR 68 north – Tennille	Southern terminus of SR 68
Johnson	Wrightsville	53.4	85.9	SR 15 north (North Marcus Street) – Sandersville	Western end of SR 15 concurrency
Johnson	Wrightsville	53.5	86.1	US 319 / SR 31 south / SR 78 north (Elm Street) – Dublin, Wadley	Western end of SR 78 concurrency; northern terminus of SR 31
Johnson	Wrightsville	53.6	86.3	SR 15 south / SR 78 south (South Marcus Street)	Eastern end of SR 15 and SR 78 concurrencies
Johnson	Kite	66.1	106.4	US 221 / SR 171 (Montgomery Street)	
Johnson		66.7	107.3	Little Ohoopee River	
Emanuel		75.8	122.0	US 1 / SR 4	
Emanuel	Swainsboro	78.6	126.5	US 80 west / SR 26 west (West Main Street) / SR 56 west (Tyson Street)	Western end of US 80/SR 26/SR 56 concurrency
Emanuel	Swainsboro	79.3	127.6	US 80 east / SR 26 east / SR 56 east (East Main Street) / US 1 Bus. north / SR 4 Bus. north (North Main Street) – Statesboro, Summertown	Eastern end of US 80/SR 26/SR 56 concurrency; western end of US 1 Business/SR 4 Business concurrency
Emanuel		80.5	129.6	US 1 north / SR 4 north (South Main Street) / US 1 Bus. north / SR 4 Bus. north	Eastern end of US 1 Business/SR 4 Business concurrency; western end of US 1/SR 4 concurrency
Emanuel		83.9	135.0	SR 297 south (Nunez Road) – Nunez	Northern terminus of SR 297
Emanuel		85.0	136.8	US 1 south / SR 4 south	Eastern end of US 1/SR 4 concurrency
Emanuel	Stillmore	93.1	149.8	SR 192 (East 4th Avenue) – Twin City	
Candler		98.5	158.5	SR 46 – Oak Park, Metter	
Candler		98.6	158.7	I-16 (Jim Gillis Historic Savannah Parkway / SR 404) – Macon, Savannah	I-16 exit 98
Tattnall	Cobbtown	105	169	SR 23 north / SR 121 north	Western end of SR 23 and SR 121 concurrencies
Tattnall	Cobbtown	106	171	SR 152 west (New Cobbtown Road) – Lyons	Eastern terminus of SR 152
Tattnall	Collins	113	182	SR 292 (Manassas Street) – Lyons, Claxton	
Tattnall	Reidsville	119	192	US 280 / SR 30 (Brazell Street)	
Tattnall		123	198	SR 121 south – Surrency	Eastern end of SR 121 concurrency
Tattnall		130.8	210.5	SR 169 (Mendes Highway) – Bellville	
Tattnall	Glennville	134.2	216.0	SR 144 west (Hencart Road) – Baxley	Western end of SR 144 concurrency
Tattnall	Glennville	134.8	216.9	US 25 north / US 301 north / SR 73 north (South Veterans Boulevard) / SR 144 east (West Barnard Street)	Eastern end of SR 144 concurrency; western end of US 25/US 301 concurrency; southern terminus of SR 73
Tattnall		136.6	219.8	SR 196 east (Baxter–Durrence Road) – Hinesville	Western terminus of SR 196
Long	Ludowici	155.8	250.7	US 25 south / US 301 south / SR 23 south (Cypress Street); US 84 / SR 38 (Cypress Street)	Eastern end of US 25/US 301 and SR 23 concurrencies
McIntosh	Townsend	173.8	279.7	SR 251 south (Briardam Road) – Darien	Northern terminus of SR 251
McIntosh		178.5	287.3	I-95 (SR 405) / SR 99 south – Brunswick, Savannah, Darien	Eastern terminus of SR 57; northern terminus of SR 99; I-95 exit 58
1.000 mi = 1.609 km; 1.000 km = 0.621 mi: Concurrency terminus

== Swainsboro connector route ==
State Route 57 Connector
- Location: Swainsboro
- Length: 3.0 mi (4.8 km)

State Route 57 Connector (SR 57 Conn.) was a 3.0-mile-long (4.8 km) connector route that functioned more like a bypass route. Its route was nearly completely within the city limits of Swainsboro.

It traveled to the south and west of the main part of Swainsboro, connecting what is now US 1 Bus./SR 4 Bus./SR 57 (South Main Street) with what is now US 80/SR 26/SR 56 (West Main Street) and the SR 57 mainline (Kight Road).
