= Georgia State Route 298 =

Highway in Georgia, United States

State Route 298
- SR 298 highlighted in red

Route information
- Maintained by GDOT
- Length: 6.6 mi (10.6 km)

Major junctions
- West end: SR 46 east of Soperton
- East end: SR 297 north of Vidalia

Location
- Country: United States
- State: Georgia
- Counties: Treutlen, Montgomery, Toombs

Highway system
- Georgia State Highway System; Interstate; US; State; Special
← SR 297	→ SR 299

State Route 298 (SR 298) is a short northwest-southeast state highway located in the east-central part of the U.S. state of Georgia. The route travels from SR 46 east of Soperton to SR 297 north of Vidalia.

== Route description ==
SR 298 begins at an intersection with SR 46 approximately 3.6 miles (5.8 km) east of Soperton, in Treutlen County. It heads southeast, and, almost immediately, has an intersection with Treutlen County Road 47 (John Phillips Road). Farther southeast is an intersection with Treutlen County Road 54. Southeast of that point, SR 298 intersects Treutlen County Road 204 and passes Price Pond. Just past Price Pond is an intersection with Treutlen County Road 53. A little while later are intersections with Treutlen County Road 51 (Naked Creek Road) and Treutlen County Road 48 in rapid succession. Just before crossing into Montgomery County, SR 298 intersects Treutlen County Road 49. In Montgomery County is an intersection with Montgomery County Road 006 (J.L. Coleman Road). Then, it enters Toombs County, where it meets its eastern terminus, an intersection with SR 297 (McIntosh Street) approximately 6.0 miles (9.7 km) north of Vidalia.

SR 298 runs its entire length through rural portions of Treutlen, Montgomery, and Toombs counties, and as a result, sees an Annual Average Daily Traffic (AADT) of less than 2,000 vehicles. The route mainly serves mainly local traffic.

== Major intersections ==
County	Location	mi	km	Destinations	Notes
Treutlen		0.0	0.0	SR 46 – Soperton, Oak Park	Western terminus
Montgomery	No major junctions				
Toombs		6.6	10.6	SR 297 (McIntosh Street) – Vidalia, Swainsboro	Eastern terminus
1.000 mi = 1.609 km; 1.000 km = 0.621 mi
