= Georgia State Route 227 =

State highway in Georgia, United States

State Route 227
- SR 227 highlighted in red

Route information
- Maintained by GDOT
- Length: 2.2 mi (3.5 km)
- Existed: 1950–present

Major junctions
- South end: US 221 / SR 56 northeast of Soperton
- South end: SR 46 east of Soperton

Location
- Country: United States
- State: Georgia
- Counties: Treutlen

Highway system
- Georgia State Highway System; Interstate; US; State; Special
← SR 226	→ SR 228

State Route 227 (SR 227) is a 2.2-mile-long (3.5 km) connecting state highway that travels south-to-north through portions of Treutlen County in the southern part of the U.S. state of Georgia. It is one of the shortest state highways in Georgia.

== Route description ==
SR 227 begins at an intersection with SR 46 east of Soperton. Here, the roadway continues as unsigned Treutlen County Road 141 (Sweet Onion Road). SR 46 heads northwest to the Treutlen County Airport and Soperton. It heads north, intersecting Treutlen CR 60 (Gillis Tennant Road). Then, it intersects Treutlen CR 45 (Joe Moxley Road, which heads northeast) and Corsey Grove Way (which heads southwest). A short distance to the north-northwest, it meets its northern terminus, an intersection with US 221/SR 56, northeast of Soperton.

SR 227 is not part of the National Highway System, a system of routes determined to be the most important for the nation's economy, mobility and defense.

== History ==
State Route 227 was designated in 1950, during a period when Georgia was actively refining and modernizing its state highway network. From the moment it appeared on official highway maps, SR 227 followed the same short south-north alignment it uses today, connecting SR 46 east of Soperton to the junction with US 221/SR 56 northeast of town. Unlike many rural routes of the era that were initially graded or only partially surfaced, SR 277 was paved along its entire 2.2-mile length at the time of its establishment. This early paving reflected its role as a small but useful connector route with Treutlen County, linking local roads to two more significant regional corridors.

Since its creation, SR 227 has seen no major regrouting's, extensions, or truncations. Its function has remained consistent: a brief connector facilitating local travel between Soperton, nearby county roads, and the larger state and U.S. highways that frame the area. The route has never been incorporated into the National Highway System, underscoring its primarily local importance rather than statewide or national strategic value.

== Major intersections ==
The entire route is in Treutlen County.

Location	mi	km	Destinations	Notes
	0.0	0.0	SR 46 – Soperton, Oak Park	Southern terminus; roadway continues as Treutlen CR 141 (Sweet Onion Road).
	2.2	3.5	US 221 / SR 56	Northern terminus
1.000 mi = 1.609 km; 1.000 km = 0.621 mi
