= Lothair, Georgia =

Lothair
- Unincorporated community
- Location within the state of Georgia Lothair (the United States)
- Coordinates: 32°21′19″N 82°39′19″W
- Country: United States
- State: Georgia
- County: Treutlen
- Elevation: 217 ft (66 m)
- Time zone: UTC-5 (Eastern (EST))
  - Summer (DST): UTC-4 (EDT)
- GNIS feature ID: 332268

Lothair is an unincorporated community in Treutlen County, Georgia, United States. It lies along State Route 199 (SR 199) and SR 199 Spur, a short distance north of its intersection with State Route 46, to the southwest of the city of Soperton, the county seat of Treutlen County. Its elevation is 217 feet (66 m).

== History ==
On December 15, 2007, an EF2 tornado struck Lothair. It touched down in a heavily forested area and caused significant tree damage. The tornado then strengthened as it moved northeast and reached the town, where a fire department building was destroyed. A mobile home northeast of the community was completely destroyed by the tornado, and another home was moved off its foundation. Right before the tornado lifted, it ripped a carport off a home and threw it approximately 50 yd (46 m) across the street. This tornado was a part of the Mid-December 2007 North American winter storms.
