= Treutlen County School District =

School district in Georgia (U.S. state)

Address
- 4313 West Main Street Soperton, Georgia, 30457; United States
- Coordinates: 32.191052°N 83.173971°W

District information
- Grades: Pre-K–12
- Superintendent: Bradley S. Anderson
- Accreditation(s): Southern Association of Colleges and Schools; Georgia Accrediting Commission

Students and staff
- Enrollment: 1,020 (2022–23)
- Faculty: 84.30 (FTE)

Other information
- Telephone: (912) 529-4228
- Fax: (912) 529-4226
- Website: treutlen.k12.ga.us

The Treutlen County School District is a public school district in Treutlen County, Georgia, United States, based in Soperton. It serves the communities of Lothair and Soperton.

== Schools ==
The Treutlen County School District has one elementary school and one middle or high school.

=== Elementary schools ===
- Treutlen Elementary School

=== Middle-High school ===
- Treutlen Middle/High School
