= Georgia State Route 152 =

State highway in Georgia, United States

State Route 152
- New Cobbtown Road
- SR 152 highlighted in red

Route information
- Maintained by GDOT
- Length: 13.2 mi (21.2 km)

Major junctions
- West end: SR 292 in Lyons
- SR 86 southeast of Oak Park
- East end: SR 23 / SR 57 / SR 121 in Cobbtown

Location
- Country: United States
- State: Georgia
- Counties: Toombs, Tattnall

Highway system
- Georgia State Highway System; Interstate; US; State; Special
← SR 151	→ SR 153

State Route 152 (SR 152) is a state highway that runs southwest–to–northeast through portions of Toombs and Tattnall counties in the east-central part of the U.S. state of Georgia. It runs from Lyons to Cobbtown.

== Route description ==
The route begins at an intersection with SR 292 in Lyons. It heads northeast to an intersection with SR 86, located southeast of Oak Park. It continues to the northeast until it meets its eastern terminus, an intersection with SR 23/SR 57/SR 121 in Cobbtown.

SR 152 is not part of the National Highway System, a system of routes determined to be the most important for the nation's economy, mobility and defense.

== Major intersections ==
County	Location	mi	km	Destinations	Notes
Toombs	Lyons	0.0	0.0	SR 292 (Northeast Broad Street / Collins Road) – Vidalia, Claxton	Western terminus
Toombs		6.4	10.3	SR 86 (Earl Kemp Road) – Reidsville, Oak Park	
Ohoopee River		7.7	12.4	Unnamed bridge over the Ohoopee River; Toombs–Tattnall county line	
Tattnall	Cobbtown	13.2	21.2	SR 23 / SR 57 / SR 121	Eastern terminus
1.000 mi = 1.609 km; 1.000 km = 0.621 mi
