= Georgia State Route 292 =

State highway in Georgia, United States

State Route 292
- Georgia State Route 292 highlighted in red

Route information
- Maintained by GDOT
- Length: 30.9 mi (49.7 km)

Major junctions
- West end: SR 15 / SR 29 in Higgston
- SR 130 / SR 297 in Vidalia; SR 130 in Vidalia; US 1 / SR 4 in Lyons; SR 152 in Lyons; SR 86 southeast of Lyons; SR 23 / SR 57 / SR 121 in Collins; SR 169 in Bellville
- East end: US 280 / SR 30 east of Bellville

Location
- Country: United States
- State: Georgia
- Counties: Montgomery, Toombs, Tattnall, Evans

Highway system
- Georgia State Highway System; Interstate; US; State; Special
← SR 291	→ SR 293

State Route 292 (SR 292) is a west–east state highway located in the east-central part of the U.S. state of Georgia. It runs from Higgston to just east of Bellville.

== Route description ==
=== Higgston to Lyons ===
SR 292 begins in Montgomery County at an intersection with SR 15/SR 29 in Higgston, where the roadway continues as Saw Mill Road. The route heads east and enters Toombs County, just before entering Vidalia along North Street. In downtown Vidalia, SR 292 intersects SR 130/SR 297 (McIntosh Street), where SR 130 and SR 292 share a four-block concurrency. The highway heads to the southeast, into Lyons, It parallels US 280/SR 30 along the way. In Lyons, SR 292 has intersections with US 1/SR 4 and SR 152.

=== Lyons to Bellville ===
East of Lyons is an intersection with SR 86. Just past SR 86, the route crosses the Ohoopee River, where it enters Tattnall County. Farther to the southeast, in the city of Collins, is an intersection with SR 23/SR 57/SR 121. The route continues east through Manassas and enters the city of Bellville. There, it intersects SR 169. Just east of Bellville, SR 292 meets its eastern terminus, an intersection with US 280/SR 30.

== Major intersections ==
County	Location	mi	km	Destinations	Notes
Montgomery	Higgston	0.0	0.0	SR 15 / SR 29 (James Street)	Western terminus
Toombs	Vidalia	3.9	6.3	SR 130 / SR 297 north (McIntosh Street) – Hazlehurst, Swainsboro	Western end of SR 130 concurrency; southern terminus of SR 297
Toombs	Vidalia	4.2	6.8	SR 130 east (North Loop Road)	Eastern end of SR 130 concurrency
Toombs	Lyons	9.3	15.0	US 1 / SR 4 (North State Street)	
Toombs	Lyons	9.9	15.9	SR 152 east (New Cobbtown Road) – Cobbtown	Western terminus of SR 152
Toombs		15.5	24.9	SR 86 (Earl Kemp Road) – Reidsville, Oak Park	
Tattnall	Collins	22.2	35.7	SR 23 / SR 57 / SR 121 (Main Street)	
Evans	Bellville	30.4	48.9	SR 169 (Smith Street) – Glennville	
Evans		30.9	49.7	US 280 / SR 30 – Reidsville, Claxton	Eastern terminus
1.000 mi = 1.609 km; 1.000 km = 0.621 mi: Concurrency terminus
