= Georgia State Route 130 =

State highway in Georgia, United States

State Route 130
- SR 130 highlighted in red

Route information
- Maintained by GDOT
- Length: 12.2 mi (19.6 km)

Major junctions
- West end: SR 135 in Petross
- US 280 / SR 15 / SR 29 / SR 30 in Vidalia; SR 292 / SR 297 in Vidalia
- East end: US 1 / SR 4 in Lyons

Location
- Country: United States
- State: Georgia
- Counties: Montgomery, Toombs

Highway system
- Georgia State Highway System; Interstate; US; State; Special
← SR 129	→ SR 131

State Route 130 (SR 130) is a 12.2-mile-long (19.6 km) state highway that travels southwest-to-northeast through portions of Montgomery and Toombs counties in the east-central part of the U.S. state of Georgia.

== Route description ==
The route begins at an intersection with SR 135 in Petross in east-central Montgomery County. It heads northeast into the center of Vidalia to an intersection with US 280/SR 15/SR 29/SR 30. Farther into town is an intersection with SR 292/SR 297, where SR 292 begins a concurrency with SR 130. Just before leaving Vidalia, the two highways split with SR 292 heading to Lyons and SR 130 heading to the northeast. It continues to the northeast until it meets its eastern terminus at an intersection with US 1/SR 4 north of downtown Lyons (but within the northern part of the city limits).

A very brief portion of SR 130 in Vidalia is the only part included in the National Highway System (NHS), a system of roadways important to the nation's economy, defense, and mobility. The portion within the NHS is from the southernmost US 280 intersection to the northern city limits.

== Major intersections ==
County	Location	mi	km	Destinations	Notes
Montgomery	Petross	0.0	0.0	SR 135 – Uvalda, Higgston	Western terminus
Toombs	Vidalia	6.1	9.8	US 280 east / SR 15 south / SR 29 south / SR 30 east (1st Street)	
Toombs	Vidalia	6.2	10.0	US 280 west / SR 15 north / SR 29 north / SR 30 west (Southwest Main Street)	
Toombs	Vidalia	6.8	10.9	SR 292 west (North Street West) / SR 297 north (McIntosh Street) – Higgston, Swainsboro	Western end of SR 292 concurrency; southern terminus of SR 297
Toombs	Vidalia	7.1	11.4	SR 292 east (North Street East) – Lyons	Eastern end of SR 292 concurrency
Toombs	Lyons	12.2	19.6	US 1 / SR 4	Eastern terminus
1.000 mi = 1.609 km; 1.000 km = 0.621 mi: Concurrency terminus
