= Toombs County School District =

School district in Georgia (U.S. state)

Address
- 600 Bulldog Rd Unit 1 Lyons, Georgia, 30436-1368; United States
- Coordinates: 32.206250°N 82.322482°W

District information
- Grades: Pre-school - 12
- Superintendent: Mr. Barry Waller
- Accreditations: Southern Association of Colleges and Schools; Georgia Accrediting Commission

Students and staff
- Enrollment: 2,856
- Faculty: 177

Other information
- Telephone: (912) 526-3141
- Fax: (912) 526-3291
- Website: www.toombscountyschools.org

The Toombs County School District is a public school district in Toombs County, Georgia, United States, based in Lyons. It serves the communities of Lyons, Santa Claus, and Vidalia.

== Schools ==
The Toombs County School District has three elementary schools, one middle school, and one high school.

=== Elementary schools ===
- Lyons Primary School
- Lyons Upper Elementary School
- Toombs Central Elementary School

=== Middle school ===
- Toombs County Middle School

=== High school ===
- Toombs County High School
