= 1956 United States presidential election in Georgia =

- November 6, 1956

All 12 Georgia votes to the Electoral College

Nominee	Adlai Stevenson	Dwight D. Eisenhower
Party	Democratic	Republican
Home state	Illinois	Pennsylvania (Note: Although he was born in Texas and grew up in Kansas before his military career, at the time of the 1952 election Eisenhower was president of Columbia University and was, officially, a resident of New York. During his first term as president, he moved his private residence to Gettysburg, Pennsylvania, and officially changed his residency to Pennsylvania.)
Running mate	Estes Kefauver	Richard Nixon
Electoral vote	12	0
Popular vote	441,094	216,652
Percentage	66.48%	32.65%
County results
Stevenson
50–60%
60–70%
70–80%
80–90%
90–100%
Eisenhower
50–60%
60–70%
President before election
Dwight D. Eisenhower
Republican
Elected President
Dwight D. Eisenhower
Republican

The 1956 United States presidential election in Georgia took place on November 6, 1956, as part of the 1956 United States presidential election. Georgia voters chose 12 representatives, or electors, to the Electoral College, who voted for president and vice president.

Georgia was won by Adlai Stevenson (D–Illinois), running with Senator Estes Kefauver, with 66.48% of the popular vote against incumbent President Dwight D. Eisenhower (R–Pennsylvania), running with Vice President Richard Nixon, with 32.65% of the popular vote. Eisenhower also remains the most recent Republican president to win more than one term without carrying Georgia once. This was the last time until 2016 a Republican won the White House without carrying Cobb County. This was also the last time until 2016 that a losing Democrat would carry the suburban Atlanta Counties of Gwinnett, Douglas, Rockdale, and the aforementioned Cobb and the last time until 2020 that a Republican president would not carry these counties in either of their of elections.

== Results ==
1956 United States presidential election in Georgia
Party	Candidate	Votes	%
Democratic	Adlai Stevenson	441,094	66.48%
Republican	Dwight D. Eisenhower (inc.)	216,652	32.65%
Write-ins	—	5,734	0.86%
Total votes		663,480	100%

=== Results by county ===
County	Adlai Stevenson Democratic		Dwight D. Eisenhower Republican		Margin		Total votes cast
County	#	%	#	%	#	%	Total votes cast
Appling	1,719	77.26%	506	22.74%	1,213	54.52%	2,225
Atkinson	1,719	93.37%	122	6.63%	1,597	86.74%	1,841
Bacon	2,445	86.12%	394	13.88%	2,051	72.24%	2,839
Baker	783	96.07%	32	3.93%	751	92.14%	815
Baldwin	2,275	67.81%	1,080	32.19%	1,195	35.62%	3,355
Banks	989	84.10%	187	15.90%	802	68.20%	1,176
Barrow	2,266	83.68%	442	16.32%	1,824	67.36%	2,708
Bartow	3,640	70.32%	1,536	29.68%	2,104	40.64%	5,176
Ben Hill	2,150	79.51%	554	20.49%	1,596	59.02%	2,704
Berrien	2,398	93.56%	165	6.44%	2,233	87.12%	2,563
Bibb	14,966	67.39%	7,242	32.61%	7,724	34.78%	22,208
Bleckley	1,537	91.87%	136	8.13%	1,401	83.74%	1,673
Brantley	1,208	84.12%	228	15.88%	980	68.24%	1,436
Brooks	1,936	78.38%	534	21.62%	1,402	56.76%	2,470
Bryan	1,242	78.96%	331	21.04%	911	57.92%	1,573
Bulloch	3,414	79.12%	901	20.88%	2,513	58.24%	4,315
Burke	1,300	64.32%	721	35.68%	579	28.64%	2,021
Butts	1,885	85.37%	323	14.63%	1,562	70.74%	2,208
Calhoun	1,094	91.09%	107	8.91%	987	82.18%	1,201
Camden	1,178	53.74%	1,014	46.26%	164	7.48%	2,192
Candler	996	76.39%	308	23.61%	688	52.78%	1,304
Carroll	4,855	73.93%	1,712	26.07%	3,143	47.86%	6,567
Catoosa	2,163	61.82%	1,336	38.18%	827	23.64%	3,499
Charlton	750	78.62%	204	21.38%	546	57.24%	954
Chatham	8,698	37.46%	14,520	62.54%	-5,822	-25.08%	23,218
Chattahoochee	107	71.33%	43	28.67%	64	42.66%	150
Chattooga	3,823	69.45%	1,682	30.55%	2,141	38.90%	5,505
Cherokee	2,110	53.57%	1,829	46.43%	281	7.14%	3,939
Clarke	4,257	66.89%	2,107	33.11%	2,150	33.78%	6,364
Clay	390	79.11%	103	20.89%	287	58.22%	493
Clayton	5,522	77.61%	1,593	22.39%	3,929	55.22%	7,115
Clinch	1,577	75.27%	518	24.73%	1,059	50.54%	2,095
Cobb	11,696	63.24%	6,798	36.76%	4,898	26.48%	18,494
Coffee	3,199	84.79%	574	15.21%	2,625	69.58%	3,773
Colquitt	4,412	76.76%	1,336	23.24%	3,076	53.52%	5,748
Columbia	866	65.16%	463	34.84%	403	30.32%	1,329
Cook	2,100	89.55%	245	10.45%	1,855	79.10%	2,345
Coweta	3,003	77.94%	850	22.06%	2,153	55.88%	3,853
Crawford	779	87.73%	109	12.27%	670	75.46%	888
Crisp	2,526	75.16%	835	24.84%	1,691	50.32%	3,361
Dade	863	54.41%	723	45.59%	140	8.82%	1,586
Dawson	721	54.05%	613	45.95%	108	8.10%	1,334
Decatur	3,699	77.69%	1,062	22.31%	2,637	55.38%	4,761
DeKalb	29,915	65.56%	15,718	34.44%	14,197	31.12%	46,633
Dodge	3,479	82.50%	738	17.50%	2,741	65.00%	4,217
Dooly	1,851	91.41%	174	8.59%	1,677	82.82%	2,025
Dougherty	4,126	55.95%	3,248	44.05%	878	11.90%	7,374
Douglas	2,111	67.83%	1,001	32.17%	1,110	35.66%	3,112
Early	1,818	90.40%	193	9.60%	1,625	80.80%	2,011
Echols	528	79.76%	134	20.24%	394	59.52%	662
Effingham	611	48.96%	637	51.04%	-26	-2.08%	1,248
Elbert	3,635	89.05%	447	10.95%	3,188	78.10%	4,082
Emanuel	2,373	77.78%	678	22.22%	1,695	55.56%	3,051
Evans	1,152	76.39%	356	23.61%	796	52.78%	1,508
Fannin	1,945	35.58%	3,521	64.42%	-1,576	-28.84%	5,466
Fayette	1,308	90.46%	138	9.54%	1,170	80.92%	1,446
Floyd	6,633	52.69%	5,955	47.31%	678	5.38%	12,588
Forsyth	1,998	63.85%	1,131	36.15%	867	27.70%	3,129
Franklin	2,968	92.15%	253	7.85%	2,715	84.30%	3,221
Fulton	51,098	57.79%	37,326	42.21%	13,772	15.58%	88,424
Gilmer	1,275	40.71%	1,857	59.29%	-582	-18.58%	3,132
Glascock	314	74.06%	110	25.94%	204	48.12%	424
Glynn	3,071	49.78%	3,098	50.22%	-27	-0.44%	6,169
Gordon	1,970	65.80%	1,024	34.20%	946	31.60%	2,994
Grady	2,697	84.47%	496	15.53%	2,201	68.94%	3,193
Greene	2,012	78.81%	541	21.19%	1,471	57.62%	2,553
Gwinnett	5,687	79.76%	1,443	20.24%	4,244	59.52%	7,130
Habersham	2,276	72.69%	855	27.31%	1,421	45.38%	3,131
Hall	5,989	68.52%	2,752	31.48%	3,237	37.04%	8,741
Hancock	860	70.84%	354	29.16%	506	41.68%	1,214
Haralson	2,472	52.71%	2,218	47.29%	254	5.42%	4,690
Harris	1,327	70.21%	563	29.79%	764	40.42%	1,890
Hart	1,139	91.41%	107	8.59%	1,032	82.82%	1,246
Heard	1,106	85.08%	194	14.92%	912	70.16%	1,300
Henry	2,636	75.66%	848	24.34%	1,788	51.32%	3,484
Houston	4,483	80.88%	1,060	19.12%	3,423	61.76%	5,543
Irwin	1,554	83.28%	312	16.72%	1,242	66.56%	1,866
Jackson	3,100	87.62%	438	12.38%	2,662	75.24%	3,538
Jasper	962	76.96%	288	23.04%	674	53.92%	1,250
Jeff Davis	1,656	87.02%	247	12.98%	1,409	74.04%	1,903
Jefferson	1,351	72.52%	512	27.48%	839	45.04%	1,863
Jenkins	1,000	79.30%	261	20.70%	739	58.60%	1,261
Johnson	1,607	89.98%	179	10.02%	1,428	79.96%	1,786
Jones	1,208	75.97%	382	24.03%	826	51.94%	1,590
Lamar	1,531	73.39%	555	26.61%	976	46.78%	2,086
Lanier	890	85.41%	152	14.59%	738	70.82%	1,042
Laurens	5,085	81.05%	1,189	18.95%	3,896	62.10%	6,274
Lee	532	87.07%	79	12.93%	453	74.14%	611
Liberty	892	47.98%	967	52.02%	-75	-4.04%	1,859
Lincoln	696	81.79%	155	18.21%	541	63.58%	851
Long	1,195	80.96%	281	19.04%	914	61.92%	1,476
Lowndes	3,936	64.83%	2,135	35.17%	1,801	29.66%	6,071
Lumpkin	693	58.78%	486	41.22%	207	17.56%	1,179
McDuffie	1,039	61.55%	649	38.45%	390	23.10%	1,688
McIntosh	624	41.32%	886	58.68%	-262	-17.36%	1,510
Macon	1,984	84.53%	363	15.47%	1,621	69.06%	2,347
Madison	2,222	93.24%	161	6.76%	2,061	86.48%	2,383
Marion	618	79.64%	158	20.36%	460	59.28%	776
Meriwether	3,137	84.12%	592	15.88%	2,545	68.24%	3,729
Miller	1,563	77.99%	441	22.01%	1,122	55.98%	2,004
Mitchell	2,735	87.74%	382	12.26%	2,353	75.48%	3,117
Monroe	1,545	75.33%	506	24.67%	1,039	50.66%	2,051
Montgomery	1,052	79.52%	271	20.48$	781	59.04%	1,323
Morgan	1,492	85.85%	246	14.15%	1,246	71.70%	1,738
Murray	1,819	61.39%	1,144	38.61%	675	22.78%	2,963
Muscogee	8,160	49.95%	8,176	50.05%	-16	-0.10%	16,336
Newton	3,232	85.87%	532	14.13%	2,700	71.74%	3,764
Oconee	1,156	78.64%	314	21.36%	842	57.28%	1,470
Oglethorpe	1,404	89.37%	167	10.63%	1,237	78.74%	1,571
Paulding	1,599	62.98%	940	37.02%	659	25.96%	2,539
Peach	1,541	76.97%	461	23.03%	1,080	53.94%	2,002
Pickens	1,236	34.55%	2,341	65.45%	-1,105	-30.90%	3,577
Pierce	1,766	85.56%	298	14.44%	1,468	71.12%	2,064
Pike	1,067	83.56%	210	16.44%	857	67.12%	1,277
Polk	4,502	68.21%	2,098	31.79%	2,404	36.42%	6,600
Pulaski	1,422	89.27%	171	10.73%	1,251	78.54%	1,593
Putnam	1,093	80.31%	268	19.69%	825	60.62%	1,361
Quitman	355	91.97%	31	8.03%	324	83.94%	386
Rabun	1,391	77.11%	413	22.89%	978	54.22%	1,804
Randolph	1,582	74.31%	547	25.69%	1,035	48.62%	2,129
Richmond	6,819	39.95%	10,251	60.05%	-3,432	-20.10%	17,070
Rockdale	1,779	78.61%	484	21.39%	1,295	57.22%	2,263
Schley	441	79.03%	117	20.97%	324	58.06%	558
Screven	1,332	71.88%	521	28.12%	811	43.76%	1,853
Seminole	1,343	91.24%	129	8.76%	1,214	82.48%	1,472
Spalding	4,853	76.90%	1,458	23.10%	3,395	53.80%	6,311
Stephens	2,595	79.14%	684	20.86%	1,911	58.28%	3,279
Stewart	692	74.65%	235	25.35%	457	49.30%	927
Sumter	2,149	74.64%	730	25.36%	1,419	49.28%	2,879
Talbot	710	83.92%	136	16.08%	574	67.84%	846
Taliaferro	599	78.92%	160	21.08%	439	57.84%	759
Tattnall	1,881	81.04%	440	18.96%	1,441	62.08%	2,321
Taylor	1,359	83.12%	276	16.88%	1,083	66.24%	1,635
Telfair	2,075	87.96%	284	12.04%	1,791	75.92%	2,359
Terrell	1,300	86.49%	203	13.51%	1,097	72.98%	1,503
Thomas	3,522	61.12%	2,240	38.88%	1,282	22.24%	5,762
Tift	3,123	76.49%	960	23.51%	2,163	52.98%	4,083
Toombs	2,397	80.93%	565	19.07%	1,832	61.86%	2,962
Towns	885	44.67%	1,096	55.33%	-211	-10.66%	1,981
Treutlen	960	89.14%	117	10.86%	843	78.28%	1,077
Troup	6,162	73.57%	2,214	26.43%	3,948	47.14%	8,376
Turner	1,398	79.79%	354	20.21%	1,044	59.58%	1,752
Twiggs	1,002	85.64%	168	14.36%	834	71.28%	1,170
Union	1,386	50.47%	1,360	49.53%	26	0.94%	2,746
Upson	3,422	82.78%	712	17.22%	2,710	65.56%	4,134
Walker	3,693	51.19%	3,522	48.81%	171	2.38%	7,215
Walton	3,271	87.44%	470	12.56%	2,801	74.88%	3,741
Ware	5,888	72.12%	2,276	27.88%	3,612	44.24%	8,164
Warren	674	81.60%	152	18.40%	522	63.20%	826
Washington	2,530	80.78%	602	19.22%	1,928	61.56%	3,132
Wayne	2,084	68.69%	950	31.31%	1,134	37.38%	3,034
Webster	295	85.26%	51	14.74%	244	70.52%	346
Wheeler	992	86.94%	149	13.06%	843	73.88%	1,141
White	1,099	70.09%	469	29.91%	630	40.18%	1,568
Whitfield	4,264	50.35%	4,205	49.65%	59	0.70%	8,469
Wilcox	1,686	87.90%	232	12.10%	1,454	75.80%	1,918
Wilkes	1,714	84.94%	304	15.06%	1,410	69.88%	2,018
Wilkinson	1,299	76.77%	393	23.23%	906	53.54%	1,692
Worth	2,078	87.64%	293	12.36%	1,785	75.28%	2,371
Totals	441,094	66.48%	216,652	32.65%	224,442	33.83%	663,480 (Note: 5,734 (0.86%) write-in votes were tabulated, but only as a statewide total and not separated by county.)

==== Counties that flipped from Democratic to Republican ====
- Glynn
- Gilmer
- McIntosh
- Liberty
- Muscogee
- Towns
