= 1960 United States presidential election in Georgia =

- November 8, 1960

Nominee	John F. Kennedy	Richard Nixon
Party	Democratic	Republican
Home state	Massachusetts	California
Running mate	Lyndon B. Johnson	Henry Cabot Lodge Jr.
Electoral vote	12	0
Popular vote	458,638	274,472
Percentage	62.54%	37.43%
County results
Kennedy
50–60%
60–70%
70–80%
80–90%
90–100%
Nixon
50–60%
60–70%
70–80%
President before election
Dwight D. Eisenhower
Republican
Elected President
John F. Kennedy
Democratic

The 1960 United States presidential election in Georgia took place on November 8, 1960, as part of the 1960 United States presidential election. Georgia voters chose 12 representatives, or electors, to the Electoral College, who voted for president and vice president.

Georgia was won by Senator John F. Kennedy (D–Massachusetts), running with Senator Lyndon B. Johnson, with 62.54% of the popular vote against incumbent Vice President Richard Nixon (R–California), running with United States Ambassador to the United Nations Henry Cabot Lodge Jr., with 37.43% of the popular vote. This is the first election where any Georgia county cast more than one hundred thousand votes, namely Fulton. Following this election Georgia would transfer from being a Deep South Democratic state, to a Sun Belt Republican state, and the state has only voted Democratic four times since. This was due to The Civil Rights Act, and the growth of Atlanta suburban counties such as Gwinnett and Cobb, which would not support the Democratic nominee again until 2016, except for favorite son Jimmy Carter in 1976.

Although there was a primary referendum on the Democratic electors acting “Pledge Free”, the primary was a non-binding straw vote and the Democratic electors voted for Kennedy and Johnson anyway. Georgia was one of six states that swung towards Republicans compared to 1956, alongside Alabama, Mississippi, Oklahoma, South Carolina, and Tennessee.

== Results ==
1960 United States presidential election in Georgia
Party	Candidate	Votes	%
Democratic	John F. Kennedy	458,638	62.54%
Republican	Richard Nixon	274,472	37.43%
Write-ins	—	239 (Note: These write-in votes were not separated by county and only given as a statewide total.)	0.03%
Total votes		733,349	100%

=== Results by county ===
County	John F. Kennedy Democratic		Richard Nixon Republican		Margin		Total votes cast
County	#	%	#	%	#	%	Total votes cast
Appling	1,973	73.35%	717	26.65%	1,256	46.70%	2,690
Atkinson	1,298	84.45%	239	15.55%	1,059	68.90%	1,537
Bacon	1,168	66.86%	579	33.14%	589	33.72%	1,747
Baker	720	91.60%	66	8.40%	654	83.20%	786
Baldwin	2,262	64.15%	1,264	35.85%	998	28.30%	3,526
Banks	1,170	84.11%	221	15.89%	949	68.22%	1,391
Barrow	2,759	82.70%	577	17.30%	2,182	65.40%	3,336
Bartow	3,545	73.29%	1,292	26.71%	2,253	46.58%	4,837
Ben Hill	1,881	77.12%	558	22.88%	1,323	54.24%	2,439
Berrien	2,787	88.34%	368	11.66%	2,419	76.68%	3,155
Bibb	14,387	57.76%	10,523	42.24%	3,864	15.52%	24,910
Bleckley	1,751	73.45%	633	26.55%	1,118	46.90%	2,384
Brantley	1,333	79.49%	344	20.51%	989	58.98%	1,677
Brooks	1,500	66.23%	765	33.77%	735	32.46%	2,265
Bryan	1,323	75.56%	428	24.44%	895	51.12%	1,751
Bulloch	3,373	69.13%	1,506	30.87%	1,867	38.26%	4,879
Burke	1,162	53.08%	1,027	46.92%	135	6.16%	2,189
Butts	1,673	81.41%	382	18.59%	1,291	62.82%	2,055
Calhoun	803	85.97%	131	14.03%	672	71.94%	934
Camden	1,321	58.17%	950	41.83%	371	16.34%	2,271
Candler	943	68.53%	433	31.47%	510	37.06%	1,376
Carroll	4,698	73.10%	1,729	26.90%	2,969	46.20%	6,427
Catoosa	2,114	50.48%	2,074	49.52%	40	0.96%	4,188
Charlton	733	71.72%	289	28.28%	444	43.44%	1,022
Chatham	16,240	47.52%	17,935	52.48%	-1,695	-4.96%	34,175
Chattahoochee	190	74.22%	66	25.78%	124	48.44%	256
Chattooga	3,686	69.78%	1,596	30.22%	2,090	39.56%	5,282
Cherokee	3,077	56.79%	2,341	43.21%	736	13.58%	5,418
Clarke	4,812	68.14%	2,250	31.86%	2,562	36.28%	7,062
Clay	528	86.27%	84	13.73%	444	72.54%	612
Clayton	5,892	66.61%	2,953	33.39%	2,939	33.22%	8,845
Clinch	898	69.34%	397	30.66%	501	38.68%	1,295
Cobb	12,906	61.03%	8,240	38.97%	4,666	22.06%	21,146
Coffee	3,376	77.38%	987	22.62%	2,389	54.76%	4,363
Colquitt	4,397	72.30%	1,685	27.70%	2,712	44.60%	6,082
Columbia	1,190	50.75%	1,155	49.25%	35	1.50%	2,345
Cook	1,935	82.90%	399	17.10%	1,536	65.80%	2,334
Coweta	3,855	76.88%	1,159	23.12%	2,696	53.76%	5,014
Crawford	797	79.70%	203	20.30%	594	59.40%	1,000
Crisp	2,365	71.06%	963	28.94%	1,402	42.12%	3,328
Dade	943	50.92%	909	49.08%	34	1.84%	1,852
Dawson	916	69.55%	401	30.45%	515	39.10%	1,317
Decatur	2,780	75.18%	918	24.82%	1,862	50.36%	3,698
DeKalb	24,116	50.07%	24,046	49.93%	70	0.14%	48,162
Dodge	3,630	76.20%	1,134	23.80%	2,496	52.40%	4,764
Dooly	1,733	88.74%	220	11.26%	1,513	77.48%	1,953
Dougherty	4,522	51.12%	4,323	48.88%	199	2.24%	8,845
Douglas	2,576	69.40%	1,136	30.60%	1,440	38.80%	3,712
Early	1,904	88.23%	254	11.77%	1,650	76.46%	2,158
Echols	257	70.41%	108	29.59%	149	40.82%	365
Effingham	880	49.86%	885	50.14%	-5	-0.28%	1,765
Elbert	3,672	85.77%	609	14.23%	3,063	71.54%	4,281
Emanuel	2,513	69.17%	1,120	30.83%	1,393	38.34%	3,633
Evans	1,069	65.34%	567	34.66%	502	30.68%	1,636
Fannin	1,579	34.32%	3,022	65.68%	-1,443	-31.36%	4,601
Fayette	1,198	76.94%	359	23.06%	839	53.88%	1,557
Floyd	7,350	54.61%	6,108	45.39%	1,242	9.22%	13,458
Forsyth	2,309	73.30%	841	26.70%	1,468	46.60%	3,150
Franklin	3,209	91.24%	308	8.76%	2,901	82.48%	3,517
Fulton	55,803	50.85%	53,940	49.15%	1,863	1.70%	109,743
Gilmer	1,472	44.31%	1,850	55.69%	-378	-11.38%	3,322
Glascock	299	62.42%	180	37.58%	119	24.84%	479
Glynn	3,584	55.05%	2,926	44.95%	658	10.10%	6,510
Gordon	2,153	65.22%	1,148	34.78%	1,005	30.44%	3,301
Grady	2,541	81.10%	592	18.90%	1,949	62.20%	3,133
Greene	1,979	85.78%	328	14.22%	1,651	71.56%	2,307
Gwinnett	6,479	73.50%	2,336	26.50%	4,143	47.00%	8,815
Habersham	2,530	73.87%	895	26.13%	1,635	47.74%	3,425
Hall	6,303	68.47%	2,903	31.53%	3,400	36.94%	9,206
Hancock	780	73.17%	286	26.83%	494	46.34%	1,066
Haralson	2,783	59.82%	1,869	40.18%	914	19.64%	4,652
Harris	1,362	64.95%	735	35.05%	627	29.90%	2,097
Hart	3,963	93.51%	275	6.49%	3,688	87.02%	4,238
Heard	1,224	87.12%	181	12.88%	1,043	74.24%	1,405
Henry	2,957	73.96%	1,041	26.04%	1,916	47.92%	3,998
Houston	4,033	69.65%	1,757	30.35%	2,276	39.30%	5,790
Irwin	1,625	82.20%	352	17.80%	1,273	64.40%	1,977
Jackson	3,653	88.56%	472	11.44%	3,181	77.12%	4,125
Jasper	949	77.79%	271	22.21%	678	55.58%	1,220
Jeff Davis	825	67.24%	402	32.76%	423	34.48%	1,227
Jefferson	1,270	56.29%	986	43.71%	284	12.58%	2,256
Jenkins	1,354	81.22%	313	18.78%	1,041	62.44%	1,667
Johnson	1,298	72.68%	488	27.32%	810	45.36%	1,786
Jones	1,415	74.32%	489	25.68%	926	48.64%	1,904
Lamar	1,363	74.00%	479	26.00%	884	48.00%	1,842
Lanier	1,049	84.12%	198	15.88%	851	68.24%	1,247
Laurens	4,648	71.16%	1,884	28.84%	2,764	42.32%	6,532
Lee	404	67.90%	191	32.10%	213	35.80%	595
Liberty	1,590	63.12%	929	36.88%	661	26.24%	2,519
Lincoln	669	77.25%	197	22.75%	472	54.50%	866
Long	278	23.64%	898	76.36%	-620	-52.72%	1,176
Lowndes	3,605	55.35%	2,908	44.65%	697	10.70%	6,513
Lumpkin	875	63.87%	495	36.13%	380	27.74%	1,370
McDuffie	1,079	50.94%	1,039	49.06%	40	1.88%	2,118
McIntosh	794	63.78%	451	36.22%	343	27.56%	1,245
Macon	1,488	77.26%	438	22.74%	1,050	54.52%	1,926
Madison	2,418	92.18%	205	7.82%	2,213	84.36%	2,623
Marion	645	80.73%	154	19.27%	491	61.46%	799
Meriwether	3,100	81.45%	706	18.55%	2,394	62.90%	3,806
Miller	1,116	94.74%	62	5.26%	1,054	89.48%	1,178
Mitchell	3,264	88.36%	430	11.64%	2,834	76.72%	3,694
Monroe	1,642	73.86%	581	26.14%	1,061	47.72%	2,223
Montgomery	1,451	79.20%	381	20.80%	1,070	58.40%	1,832
Morgan	1,488	79.96%	373	20.04%	1,115	59.92%	1,861
Murray	1,876	66.98%	925	33.02%	951	33.96%	2,801
Muscogee	8,553	47.17%	9,578	52.83%	-1,025	-5.66%	18,131
Newton	3,185	81.81%	708	18.19%	2,477	63.62%	3,893
Oconee	1,218	80.40%	297	19.60%	921	60.80%	1,515
Oglethorpe	1,406	90.83%	142	9.17%	1,264	81.66%	1,548
Paulding	2,396	74.69%	812	25.31%	1,584	49.38%	3,208
Peach	1,433	69.53%	628	30.47%	805	39.06%	2,061
Pickens	1,473	43.12%	1,943	56.88%	-470	-13.76%	3,416
Pierce	1,449	72.70%	544	27.30%	905	45.40%	1,993
Pike	1,028	80.12%	255	19.88%	773	60.24%	1,283
Polk	4,351	71.36%	1,746	28.64%	2,605	42.72%	6,097
Pulaski	1,156	77.58%	334	22.42%	822	55.16%	1,490
Putnam	1,104	78.35%	305	21.65%	799	56.70%	1,409
Quitman	388	85.27%	67	14.73%	321	70.54%	455
Rabun	1,552	76.98%	464	23.02%	1,088	53.96%	2,016
Randolph	1,436	75.86%	457	24.14%	979	51.72%	1,893
Richmond	9,868	45.17%	11,978	54.83%	-2,110	-9.66%	21,846
Rockdale	1,765	78.06%	496	21.94%	1,269	56.12%	2,261
Schley	467	77.19%	138	22.81%	329	54.38%	605
Screven	1,490	60.89%	957	39.11%	533	21.78%	2,447
Seminole	1,579	95.35%	77	4.65%	1,502	90.70%	1,656
Spalding	4,426	71.63%	1,753	28.37%	2,673	43.26%	6,179
Stephens	3,087	79.11%	815	20.89%	2,272	58.22%	3,902
Stewart	646	68.14%	302	31.86%	344	36.28%	948
Sumter	2,274	70.27%	962	29.73%	1,312	40.54%	3,236
Talbot	771	78.83%	207	21.17%	564	57.66%	978
Taliaferro	655	81.57%	148	18.43%	507	63.14%	803
Tattnall	1,908	68.71%	869	31.29%	1,039	37.42%	2,777
Taylor	1,201	76.69%	365	23.31%	836	53.38%	1,566
Telfair	2,922	78.70%	791	21.30%	2,131	57.40%	3,713
Terrell	1,352	82.59%	285	17.41%	1,067	65.18%	1,637
Thomas	3,226	58.54%	2,285	41.46%	941	17.08%	5,511
Tift	2,964	67.56%	1,423	32.44%	1,541	35.12%	4,387
Toombs	2,209	68.03%	1,038	31.97%	1,171	36.06%	3,247
Towns	1,052	45.27%	1,272	54.73%	-220	-9.46%	2,324
Treutlen	927	81.10%	216	18.90%	711	62.20%	1,143
Troup	5,745	67.17%	2,808	32.83%	2,937	34.34%	8,553
Turner	1,545	82.49%	328	17.51%	1,217	64.98%	1,873
Twiggs	845	76.26%	263	23.74%	582	52.52%	1,108
Union	1,185	43.53%	1,537	56.47%	-352	-12.94%	2,722
Upson	3,262	76.52%	1,001	23.48%	2,261	53.04%	4,263
Walker	4,566	53.14%	4,027	46.86%	539	6.28%	8,593
Walton	3,095	88.48%	403	11.52%	2,692	76.96%	3,498
Ware	5,099	69.53%	2,235	30.47%	2,864	39.06%	7,334
Warren	471	55.67%	375	44.33%	96	11.34%	846
Washington	2,004	67.70%	956	32.30%	1,048	35.40%	2,960
Wayne	2,862	67.40%	1,384	32.60%	1,478	34.80%	4,246
Webster	297	79.41%	77	20.59%	220	58.82%	374
Wheeler	970	81.10%	226	18.90%	744	62.20%	1,196
White	1,784	72.94%	662	27.06%	1,122	45.88%	2,446
Whitfield	3,604	46.49%	4,148	53.51%	-544	-7.02%	7,752
Wilcox	1,714	84.85%	306	15.15%	1,408	69.70%	2,020
Wilkes	1,786	81.89%	395	18.11%	1,391	63.78%	2,181
Wilkinson	1,324	67.72%	631	32.28%	693	35.44%	1,955
Worth	2,110	86.19%	338	13.81%	1,772	72.38%	2,448
Totals	458,638	62.54%	274,472	37.43%	184,166	25.11%	733,349

==== Counties that flipped from Republican to Democratic ====
- Glynn
- Liberty
- McIntosh

==== Counties that flipped from Democratic to Republican ====
- Long
- Union
- Whitfield
