= Treutlen County, Georgia =

County in Georgia, United States

- County
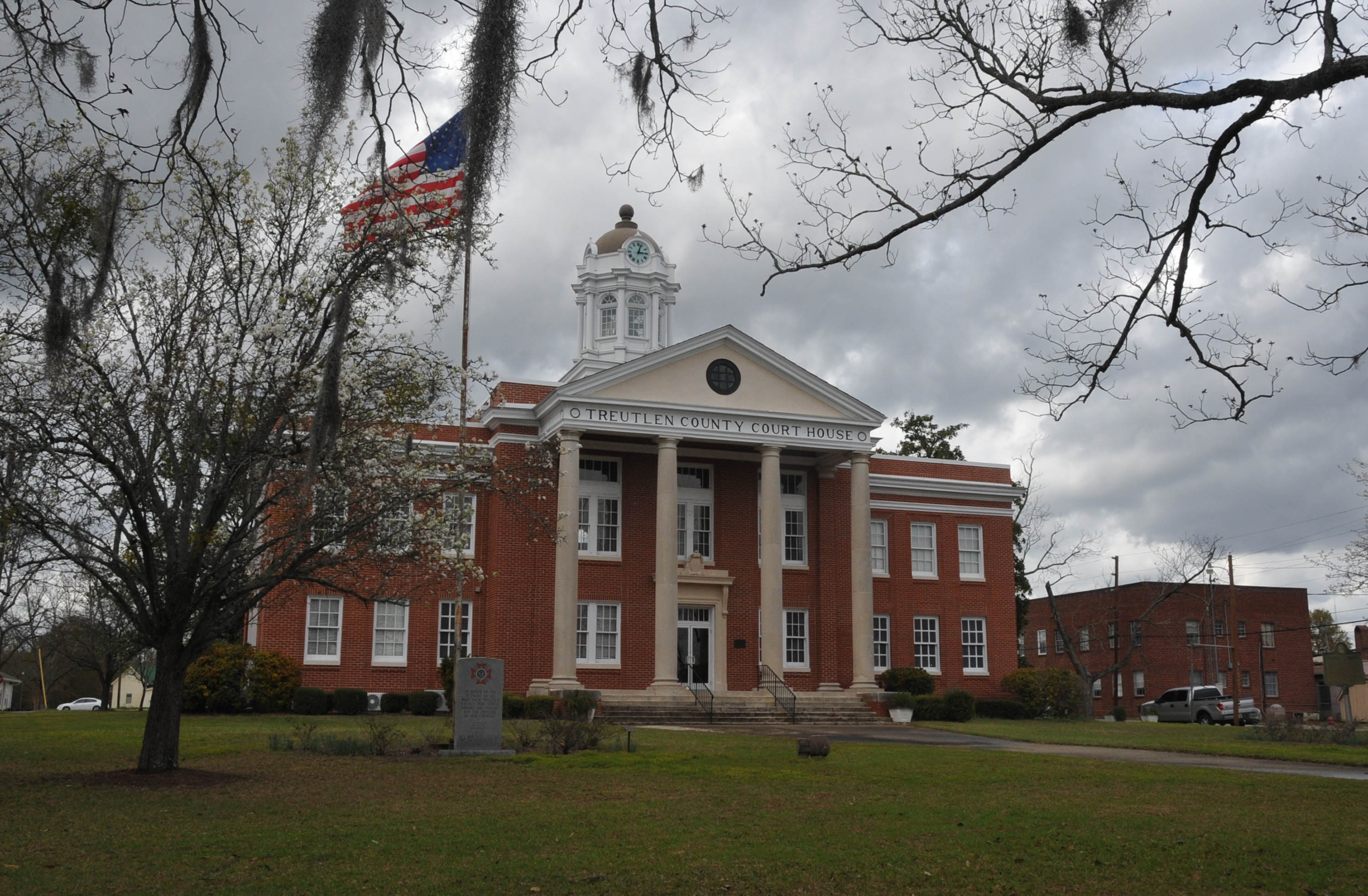
- Treutlen County Courthouse in Soperton

- Seal

- Location within the U.S. state of Georgia
- Coordinates: 32°24′N 82°34′W
- Country: United States
- State: Georgia
- Founded: November 5, 1918; 107 years ago
- Named for: John A. Treutlen
- Seat: Soperton
- Largest city: Soperton

Area
  - Total: 202 sq mi (520 km^{2})
  - Land: 199 sq mi (520 km^{2})
  - Water: 3.0 sq mi (7.8 km^{2}) 1.5%

Population (2020)
  - Total: 6,406
  - Estimate (2025): 6,466 ▲
  - Density: 32/sq mi (12/km^{2})
- Time zone: UTC−5 (Eastern)
  - Summer (DST): UTC−4 (EDT)
- Congressional district: 12th
- Website: treutlencountygov.com

Treutlen County (/ˈtruːtlɪn/ TROOT-lin) is a county located in the southern portion and Magnolia midlands portion of the U.S. state of Georgia. As of the 2020 census, the population was 6,406. The county seat is Soperton. Treutlen County is host to the Million Pines Arts and Crafts Festival which takes place during the first weekend in November.

== History ==
Before colonization, the area was home to the Muscogee. Following the American Revolution, the location's wiregrass (Aristida stricta) attracted settlers, and a timber industry began to develop around the area's longleaf pine forests, supporting occupations from cabinetmaking and milling to turpentine and other naval stores production.

The area's landscape made it difficult to build roads, resulting in a sparse population until after the Civil War when railroads arrived. In 1902, the Macon, Dublin and Savannah Railroad completed its extension from Macon to Vidalia and constructed a railroad depot near Lothair. The newly incorporated town of Soperton quickly outgrew Lothair due to the new rail link.

An official process to create Treutlen County was spearheaded by Neil L. Gillis, known as the "father of Treutlen County" due to his efforts. The state constitutional amendment to create Treutlen County was proposed by the Georgia General Assembly on August 21, 1917, and ratified November 5, 1918, officially making it Georgia's 154th county. The county is made up of former sections of Emanuel and Montgomery counties, and is named for John A. Treutlen, Georgia's first state governor following adoption of the state Constitution of 1777. By this time, as Soperton had become larger than Lothair, it was the clear choice for county seat.

During the 1920s, a local cotton farmer named James Fowler planted over 7 million pine trees across 10,000 acres of land. Fowler worked together with scientist Charles Herty, who developed a process to use pine pulp to create paper.

== Geography ==
According to the U.S. Census Bureau, the county has a total area of 202 square miles (520 km^{2}), of which 199 square miles (520 km^{2}) is land and 3.0 square miles (7.8 km^{2}) (1.5%) is water. Approximately 90% of the county is forested.

The western portion of Treutlen County, west of Soperton, is located in the Lower Oconee River sub-basin of the Altamaha River basin. The eastern portion of the county is located in the Ohoopee River sub-basin of the larger Altamaha River basin.

=== Major highways ===
- I-16 / SR 404 (unsigned)
- US 221
- SR 15
- SR 29
- SR 46
- SR 56
- SR 57
- SR 78
- SR 86
- SR 171
- SR 199
  - SR 199 Spur
- SR 227
- SR 297
- SR 298

=== Adjacent counties ===
- Emanuel County (northeast)
- Montgomery County (southeast)
- Wheeler County (southwest)
- Laurens County (west)
- Johnson County (northwest)

== Communities ==
=== City ===
- Soperton (county seat)

=== Unincorporated communities ===
- Lothair
- Orland

== Demographics ==
Historical population
Census	Pop.	Note	%±
1920	7,664		—
1930	7,488		−2.3%
1940	7,632		1.9%
1950	6,522		−14.5%
1960	5,874		−9.9%
1970	5,647		−3.9%
1980	6,087		7.8%
1990	5,994		−1.5%
2000	6,854		14.3%
2010	6,885		0.5%
2020	6,406		−7.0%
2025 (est.)	6,466	▲	0.9%
U.S. Decennial Census; 1790-1880 1890-1910; 1920-1930 1930-1940; 1940-1950 1960-1980; 1980-2000 2010

=== Racial and ethnic composition ===
Treutlen County, Georgia – Racial and ethnic composition Note: the US Census treats Hispanic/Latino as an ethnic category. This table excludes Latinos from the racial categories and assigns them to a separate category. Hispanics/Latinos may be of any race.
Race / Ethnicity (NH = Non-Hispanic)	Pop 1980	Pop 1990	Pop 2000	Pop 2010	Pop 2020	% 1980	% 1990	% 2000	% 2010	% 2020
White alone (NH)	4,019	3,993	4,463	4,466	4,065	66.03%	66.62%	65.12%	64.87%	63.46%
Black or African American alone (NH)	1,989	1,982	2,253	2,239	1,999	32.68%	33.07%	32.87%	32.52%	31.21%
Native American or Alaska Native alone (NH)	0	2	4	10	19	0.00%	0.03%	0.06%	0.15%	0.30%
Asian alone (NH)	6	0	18	13	7	0.10%	0.00%	0.26%	0.19%	0.11%
Native Hawaiian or Pacific Islander alone (NH)	x	x	0	0	0	x	x	0.00%	0.00%	0.00%
Other race alone (NH)	2	1	4	2	7	0.03%	0.02%	0.06%	0.03%	0.11%
Mixed race or Multiracial (NH)	x	x	33	52	139	x	x	0.48%	0.76%	2.17%
Hispanic or Latino (any race)	71	16	79	103	170	1.17%	0.27%	1.15%	1.50%	2.65%
Total	6,087	5,994	6,854	6,885	6,406	100.00%	100.00%	100.00%	100.00%	100.00%

=== 2020 census ===
As of the 2020 census, there were 6,406 people, 2,449 households, and 1,654 families residing in the county. The median age was 40.5 years, 23.0% of residents were under the age of 18, 18.2% of residents were 65 years of age or older, for every 100 females there were 102.6 males (102.4 males age 18 and over), and 0.0% of residents lived in urban areas while 100.0% lived in rural areas.

The racial makeup of the county was 64.1% White, 31.6% Black or African American, 0.3% American Indian and Alaska Native, 0.1% Asian, 0.0% Native Hawaiian and Pacific Islander, 1.0% from some other race, and 2.8% from two or more races. Hispanic or Latino residents of any race comprised 2.7% of the population.

There were 2,449 households in the county, of which 32.5% had children under the age of 18 living with them and 33.8% had a female householder with no spouse or partner present. About 29.0% of all households were made up of individuals and 14.6% had someone living alone who was 65 years of age or older.

There were 2,868 housing units, of which 14.6% were vacant. Among occupied housing units, 67.7% were owner-occupied and 32.3% were renter-occupied. The homeowner vacancy rate was 1.5% and the rental vacancy rate was 7.0%.

== Politics ==
As of the 2020s, Treutlen County is a Republican stronghold, voting 72% for Donald Trump in 2024. For elections to the United States House of Representatives, Treutlen County is part of Georgia's 12th congressional district, currently represented by Rick Allen. For elections to the Georgia State Senate, Treutlen County is part of District 20. For elections to the Georgia House of Representatives, Treutlen County is part of District 158.

United States presidential election results for Treutlen County, Georgia
Year	Republican		Democratic		Third party(ies)	
Year	No.	%	No.	%	No.	%
1920	107	28.92%	263	71.08%	0	0.00%
1924	27	10.71%	222	88.10%	3	1.19%
1928	64	14.04%	392	85.96%	0	0.00%
1932	36	4.07%	849	95.93%	0	0.00%
1936	23	2.46%	912	97.44%	1	0.11%
1940	38	3.11%	1,184	96.89%	0	0.00%
1944	34	3.67%	893	96.33%	0	0.00%
1948	26	3.86%	413	61.37%	234	34.77%
1952	101	6.66%	1,416	93.34%	0	0.00%
1956	117	10.86%	960	89.14%	0	0.00%
1960	216	18.90%	927	81.10%	0	0.00%
1964	722	35.15%	1,331	64.80%	1	0.05%
1968	474	25.00%	341	17.99%	1,081	57.01%
1972	1,346	86.50%	210	13.50%	0	0.00%
1976	465	22.88%	1,567	77.12%	0	0.00%
1980	668	33.33%	1,307	65.22%	29	1.45%
1984	1,086	56.30%	843	43.70%	0	0.00%
1988	970	57.19%	726	42.81%	0	0.00%
1992	898	38.31%	1,116	47.61%	330	14.08%
1996	723	41.10%	912	51.85%	124	7.05%
2000	1,062	54.10%	879	44.78%	22	1.12%
2004	1,691	61.22%	1,052	38.09%	19	0.69%
2008	1,826	61.65%	1,112	37.54%	24	0.81%
2012	1,652	60.05%	1,074	39.04%	25	0.91%
2016	1,809	66.93%	862	31.89%	32	1.18%
2020	2,101	68.28%	952	30.94%	24	0.78%
2024	2,250	72.09%	864	27.68%	7	0.22%

United States Senate election results for Treutlen County, Georgia2
Year	Republican		Democratic		Third party(ies)	
Year	No.	%	No.	%	No.	%
2020	2,078	68.74%	893	29.54%	52	1.72%
2020	1,859	68.70%	847	31.30%	0	0.00%

United States Senate election results for Treutlen County, Georgia3
Year	Republican		Democratic		Third party(ies)	
Year	No.	%	No.	%	No.	%
2020	965	32.50%	551	18.56%	1,453	48.94%
2020	551	36.66%	952	63.34%	0	0.00%
2022	1,721	70.42%	711	29.09%	12	0.49%
2022	1,644	70.65%	683	29.35%	0	0.00%

Georgia Gubernatorial election results for Treutlen County
Year	Republican		Democratic		Third party(ies)	
Year	No.	%	No.	%	No.	%
2022	1,764	72.03%	677	27.64%	8	0.33%

== Education ==
Public education is provided by the Treutlen County School District.

== See also ==
- National Register of Historic Places listings in Treutlen County, Georgia
- List of counties in Georgia
