= Georgia State Route 297 =

Highway in Georgia, United States

State Route 297
- Georgia State Route 297 highlighted in red

Route information
- Maintained by GDOT
- Length: 23.8 mi (38.3 km)

Major junctions
- South end: SR 130 / SR 292 in Vidalia
- SR 298 north of Vidalia; SR 46 northwest of Oak Park; I-16 northwest of Oak Park
- North end: US 1 / SR 4 / SR 57 southeast of Swainsboro

Location
- Country: United States
- State: Georgia
- Counties: Toombs, Treutlen, Emanuel

Highway system
- Georgia State Highway System; Interstate; US; State; Special
← SR 296	→ SR 298

Georgia State Route 297 (SR 297) is a south-north state highway located in the east-central part of the U.S. state of Georgia. The route travels from SR 130/SR 292 in Vidalia to US 1/SR 4/SR 57 southeast of Swainsboro.

== Route description ==
SR 297 begins at an intersection with SR 130/SR 292 in Vidalia. The highway leaves Vidalia along McIntosh Street. It travels north through rural portions of Toombs County. Shortly after its intersection with SR 298, the route encounters the quadripoint, the meeting point of Emanuel, Montgomery, Toombs, and Treutlen counties. SR 297 then straddles the Treutlen-Emanuel County line. The route intersects SR 46, then Interstate 16 (I-16), where it begins making a northeastward jaunt, before crossing the Ohoopee River and entering Emanuel County proper. The route continues northeast to meet its northern terminus, an intersection with US 1/SR 4/SR 57 southeast of Swainsboro.

SR 297 is a rural route, and sees an Average Annual Daily Traffic (AADT) of less than 5,000 vehicles over its whole length, with an AADT of less than 2,000 vehicles on the segment in Emanuel County.

== Major intersections ==
County	Location	mi	km	Destinations	Notes
Toombs	Vidalia	0.0	0.0	SR 130 / SR 292 (McIntosh Street)	Southern terminus
Toombs		7.6	12.2	SR 298 west – Soperton	Eastern terminus of SR 298
Emanuel		12.3	19.8	SR 46 – Soperton, Oak Park	
Emanuel		13.8	22.2	I-16 (Jim Gillis Historic Savannah Parkway / SR 404) – Macon, Savannah	I-16 exit 84
Emanuel	Ohoopee River	15.5	24.9	Crossing	
Emanuel		23.8	38.3	US 1 (Bill English Highway) / SR 4 / SR 57	Northern terminus
1.000 mi = 1.609 km; 1.000 km = 0.621 mi
