= Ohoopee, Georgia =

- Unincorporated community Census-designated place
- Location within Georgia
- Coordinates: 32°10′50.91″N 82°13′14.73″W
- Country: United States
- State: Georgia
- County: Toombs
- Elevation: 187 ft (57 m)

Population (2020)
  - Total: 29
- Time zone: UTC−5 (Eastern (EST))
  - Summer (DST): UTC−4 (EDT)
- GNIS feature ID: 2812701

Ohoopee is an unincorporated community and census-designated place (CDP) in Toombs County, in the U.S. state of Georgia.

The 2020 Census listed a population of 29.

== History ==
A post office called Ohoopee was established in 1875, and remained in operation until 1953. The community took its name from the nearby Ohoopee River.

The Georgia General Assembly incorporated Ohoopee as a town in 1907. The town's municipal charter was repealed in 1995.

== Demographics ==
Historical population
Census	Pop.	Note	%±
2020	29		—
U.S. Decennial Census; 2020

Ohoopee was first listed as a census designated place in the 2020 United States census.

Ohoopee CDP, Georgia – Racial and ethnic composition Note: the US Census treats Hispanic/Latino as an ethnic category. This table excludes Latinos from the racial categories and assigns them to a separate category. Hispanics/Latinos may be of any race.
Race / Ethnicity (NH = Non-Hispanic)	Pop 2020	% 2020
White alone (NH)	25	86.21%
Black or African American alone (NH)	1	3.45%
Native American or Alaska Native alone (NH)	0	0.00%
Asian alone (NH)	0	0.00%
Pacific Islander alone (NH)	0	0.00%
Other Race alone (NH)	0	0.00%
Mixed race or Multiracial (NH)	1	3.45%
Hispanic or Latino (any race)	2	6.90%
Total	29	100.00%
