= Rockledge, Georgia =

- Unincorporated community
- Location within Georgia Location within the United States
- Coordinates: 32°26′35″N 82°41′51″W
- Country: United States
- State: Georgia
- County: Laurens
- Elevation: 217 ft (66 m)
- Time zone: UTC-5 (Eastern (EST))
  - Summer (DST): UTC-4 (EDT)
- ZIP code: 30454
- Area code: 478
- GNIS feature ID: 321774

Rockledge is an unincorporated community in Laurens County, Georgia, United States. The community is located along a Georgia Central Railway line near Georgia State Route 29, 13.8 miles (22.2 km) east-southeast of Dublin. Rockledge has a post office with ZIP code 30454.

== History ==
A post office called Rockledge was established in 1899. The community was named for a rock formation ("ledge of rock") near the original town site.

The Georgia General Assembly incorporated Rockledge as a town in 1908. The town's municipal charter was repealed in 1995.
