= Don Collins (baseball) =

American baseball player (1952–2022)

- Pitcher
- Born: September 15, 1952; Lyons, Georgia, U.S.
- Died: May 22, 2022 (aged 69); Sharpsburg, Georgia, U.S.
- Batted: Right Threw: Left

MLB debut
- May 4, 1977, for the Atlanta Braves

Last MLB appearance
- July 4, 1980, for the Cleveland Indians

MLB statistics
- Earned run average: 5.28
- Strikeouts: 27
- Win–loss record: 3–9
- Stats at Baseball Reference

Teams
- Atlanta Braves (1977); Cleveland Indians (1980)

Donald Edward Collins (September 15, 1952 – May 22, 2022) was an American Major League Baseball pitcher who played for two seasons. He played for the Atlanta Braves in 1977 and the Cleveland Indians in 1980.

He attended South Georgia State College.

== Post-retirement ==
After retirement, he owned a barbershop in Newnan, Georgia.

He died of cancer on May 22, 2022.
