= Scottsboro, Georgia =

- Unincorporated community
- Location within the state of Georgia Scottsboro, Georgia (the United States)
- Coordinates: 33°01′30″N 83°14′05″W
- Country: United States
- State: Georgia
- County: Baldwin
- Elevation: 466 ft (142 m)
- Time zone: UTC-5 (Eastern (EST))
  - Summer (DST): UTC-4 (EDT)
- Area code: 478
- GNIS ID: 356525

Scottsboro (also Scottsborough) is an unincorporated community in Baldwin County, Georgia, United States. It is located around 4 miles (6.4 km) south of Milledgeville.

== History ==
A post office called Scottsboro was established in 1896, and remained in operation until 1902. The community was named after General John Scott, an early settler.
