= Nunez, Georgia =

- City
- Location in Emanuel County and the state of Georgia
- Coordinates: 32°29′31″N 82°20′48″W
- Country: United States
- State: Georgia
- County: Emanuel

Area
  - Total: 1.34 sq mi (3.47 km^{2})
  - Land: 1.32 sq mi (3.42 km^{2})
  - Water: 0.019 sq mi (0.05 km^{2})
- Elevation: 249 ft (76 m)

Population (2020)
  - Total: 134
  - Density: 101.5/sq mi (39.19/km^{2})
- Time zone: UTC-5 (Eastern (EST))
  - Summer (DST): UTC-4 (EDT)
- ZIP code: 30448
- Area code: 912
- FIPS code: 13-56644
- GNIS feature ID: 0319720

Nunez is a city in Emanuel County, Georgia, United States. The population was 134 in 2020.

== History ==
The Georgia General Assembly incorporated Nunez as a town in 1903. The city was named after Samuel Nunez, a pioneer Jew in Georgia history.

== Geography ==
Nunez is located in southern Emanuel County. Georgia State Route 297 passes through the city.

According to the U.S. Census Bureau, Nunez has a total area of 1.4 square miles (3.5 km^{2}), of which 0.02 square miles (0.05 km^{2}), or 1.52%, is water.

== Demographics ==
Historical population
Census	Pop.	Note	%±
1910	174		—
1920	730		319.5%
1930	162		−77.8%
1940	155		−4.3%
1950	82		−47.1%
1960	18		−78.0%
1970	117		550.0%
1980	168		43.6%
1990	135		−19.6%
2000	131		−3.0%
2010	147		12.2%
2020	134		−8.8%
U.S. Decennial Census

As of the census of 2000, there were 131 people, 50 households, and 36 families residing in the town. By the 2020 census, its population was 134.
