= Lyons, Georgia =

- City
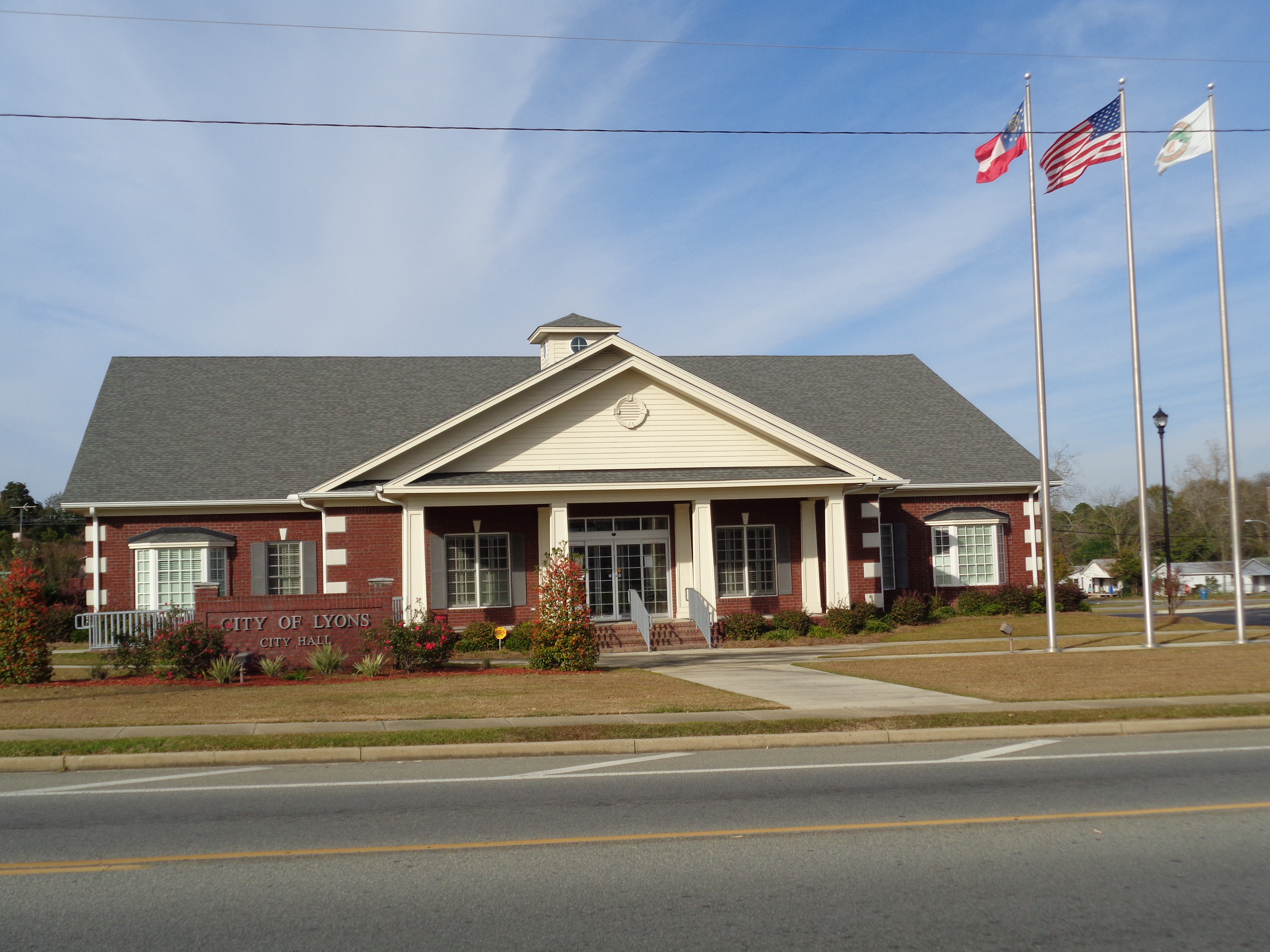
- Lyons City Hall

- Flag Seal

- Location in Toombs County and the state of Georgia
- Coordinates: 32°12′15″N 82°19′22″W
- Country: United States
- State: Georgia
- County: Toombs

Area
  - Total: 8.20 sq mi (21.24 km^{2})
  - Land: 8.01 sq mi (20.75 km^{2})
  - Water: 0.19 sq mi (0.49 km^{2})
- Elevation: 240 ft (73 m)

Population (2020)
  - Total: 4,239
  - Density: 529.2/sq mi (204.31/km^{2})
- Time zone: UTC-5 (Eastern (EST))
  - Summer (DST): UTC-4 (EDT)
- ZIP code: 30436
- Area code: 912
- FIPS code: 13-48232
- GNIS feature ID: 0317505
- Website: www.lyonsga.gov

Lyons is a city in and the county seat of Toombs County, Georgia, United States. The population was 4,239 in 2020.

== History ==
Lyons was founded c. 1890 as a depot on the Central of Georgia Railway. The community was named after Mr. Lyons, a railroad official. It was incorporated on December 9, 1897. In 1905, Lyons was designated seat of the newly formed Toombs County.

== Geography ==
Lyons is located at 32°12′15″N 82°19′22″W (32.204287, -82.322732).

The city is located at the junction of U.S. Routes 1 and 280. U.S. 1 runs north–south through the center of town, leading north 12 mi (19 km) to Oak Park just south of its junction with Interstate 16 and south 31 mi (50 km) to Baxley. U.S. 280 runs east–west through the city as West Liberty Avenue, leading southeast 15 mi (24 km) to Reidsville and west 6 mi (10 km) to Vidalia. Other highways that run through the city include Georgia State Routes 152, 178, and 292.

According to the United States Census Bureau, the city has a total area of 7.5 square miles (19 km^{2}), of which 7.5 square miles (19 km^{2}) is land and 0.04 square miles (0.10 km^{2}) (0.53%) is water.

== Demographics ==
Historical population
Census	Pop.	Note	%±
1900	534		—
1910	927		73.6%
1920	873		−5.8%
1930	1,445		65.5%
1940	1,900		31.5%
1950	2,799		47.3%
1960	3,219		15.0%
1970	3,739		16.2%
1980	4,203		12.4%
1990	4,502		7.1%
2000	4,169		−7.4%
2010	4,367		4.7%
2020	4,239		−2.9%
U.S. Decennial Census

=== 2020 census ===
As of the 2020 census, Lyons had a population of 4,239. The median age was 36.0 years. 27.3% of residents were under the age of 18 and 16.8% of residents were 65 years of age or older. For every 100 females there were 86.0 males, and for every 100 females age 18 and over there were 80.0 males age 18 and over.

84.4% of residents lived in urban areas, while 15.6% lived in rural areas.

There were 1,674 households in Lyons, of which 33.8% had children under the age of 18 living in them. Of all households, 30.9% were married-couple households, 19.1% were households with a male householder and no spouse or partner present, and 42.3% were households with a female householder and no spouse or partner present. About 31.8% of all households were made up of individuals and 12.5% had someone living alone who was 65 years of age or older. As of the 2020 census, there were 1,013 families residing in the city.

There were 1,914 housing units, of which 12.5% were vacant. The homeowner vacancy rate was 1.7% and the rental vacancy rate was 8.0%.

Lyons racial composition as of 2020
Race	Num.	Perc.
White (non-Hispanic)	2,011	47.44%
Black or African American (non-Hispanic)	1,390	32.79%
Native American	2	0.05%
Asian	22	0.52%
Pacific Islander	2	0.05%
Other/Mixed	144	3.4%
Hispanic or Latino	668	15.76%

== Education ==
=== Toombs County School District ===
The Toombs County School District holds pre-school to grade twelve, and consists of three elementary schools, a middle school, and a high school. The district has 177 full-time teachers and over 2,856 students.

== Notable people ==
- Jeremy Beasley (born 1995), MLB Pitcher
- Mel Blount (born 1948), NFL player who played with the Pittsburgh Steelers
- Craig Campbell (born 1979), country music singer
- Don Collins (1952–2022) former professional baseball player
- John P. Coursey (1914–1992), brigadier general and naval aviator in the Marine Corps
- Nick Eason (born 1980), NFL player currently with the Pittsburgh Steelers
- Mads Krügger (born 1985), professional wrestler
- Robert Mallard (1918–1948), lynching victim
- Travares Tillman (born 1977), professional football player
