= Soperton, Georgia =

City in Georgia, United States

- City
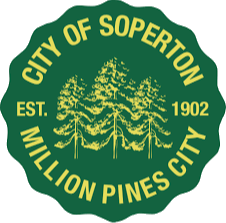
- Seal

- Location in Treutlen County and the state of Georgia
- Coordinates: 32°22′34″N 82°35′34″W
- Country: United States
- State: Georgia
- County: Treutlen

Government
  - Mayor: John O. Koon

Area
  - Total: 4.46 sq mi (11.56 km^{2})
  - Land: 4.40 sq mi (11.40 km^{2})
  - Water: 0.062 sq mi (0.16 km^{2})
- Elevation: 300 ft (90 m)

Population (2020)
  - Total: 2,889
  - Density: 656.3/sq mi (253.38/km^{2})
- Time zone: UTC-5 (Eastern (EST))
  - Summer (DST): UTC-4 (EDT)
- ZIP code: 30457
- Area code: 912
- FIPS code: 13-71772
- GNIS feature ID: 0323223
- Website: sopertoncityga.com

Soperton is a city in Treutlen County, Georgia, United States. The population was 2,889 in 2020. The city is the county seat of Treutlen County.

== History ==
A post office was established at Soperton in 1902. The city was named after Benjamin Franklin Soper, a railroad official.

The Georgia General Assembly incorporated Soperton as a town in 1902.

== Geography ==
According to the United States Census Bureau, the city has a total area of 3.3 square miles (8.5 km^{2}), of which 3.2 square miles (8.3 km^{2}) is land and 0.04 square miles (0.10 km^{2}) (0.61%) is water.

== Demographics ==
Historical population
Census	Pop.	Note	%±
1910	469		—
1920	1,033		120.3%
1930	1,081		4.6%
1940	1,339		23.9%
1950	1,667		24.5%
1960	2,317		39.0%
1970	2,596		12.0%
1980	2,981		14.8%
1990	2,797		−6.2%
2000	2,824		1.0%
2010	3,115		10.3%
2020	2,889		−7.3%
U.S. Decennial Census; 1850-1870 1870-1880; 1890-1910 1920-1930; 1940 1950 1960; 1970 1980 1990; 2000 2010

=== 2020 census ===
As of the 2020 census, Soperton had a population of 2,889. The median age was 38.1 years. 23.6% of residents were under the age of 18 and 17.1% of residents were 65 years of age or older. For every 100 females there were 105.3 males, and for every 100 females age 18 and over there were 101.7 males age 18 and over.

0.0% of residents lived in urban areas, while 100.0% lived in rural areas.

There were 1,038 households in Soperton, of which 34.7% had children under the age of 18 living in them. Of all households, 29.6% were married-couple households, 19.1% were households with a male householder and no spouse or partner present, and 45.6% were households with a female householder and no spouse or partner present. About 30.6% of all households were made up of individuals and 15.3% had someone living alone who was 65 years of age or older.

There were 1,184 housing units, of which 12.3% were vacant. The homeowner vacancy rate was 2.7% and the rental vacancy rate was 7.5%.

Soperton racial composition as of 2020
Race	Num.	Perc.
White (non-Hispanic)	1,097	37.97%
Black or African American (non-Hispanic)	1,643	56.87%
Native American	6	0.21%
Asian	6	0.21%
Other/Mixed	66	2.28%
Hispanic or Latino	71	2.46%

As of the 2020 census, there were 699 families residing in the city.

== Education ==
=== Treutlen County School District ===
The Treutlen County School District holds pre-school to grade twelve, and consists of one elementary school and a middle/high school. The district has 74 full-time teachers and over 1,234 students.

- Treutlen Elementary School
- Treutlen Middle/High School
