= Oak Park, Georgia =

- City
- Location in Emanuel County and the state of Georgia
- Coordinates: 32°22′15″N 82°18′36″W
- Country: United States
- State: Georgia
- County: Emanuel

Area
  - Total: 7.22 sq mi (18.71 km^{2})
  - Land: 7.07 sq mi (18.30 km^{2})
  - Water: 0.16 sq mi (0.41 km^{2})
- Elevation: 259 ft (79 m)

Population (2020)
  - Total: 512
  - Density: 72.4/sq mi (27.97/km^{2})
- Time zone: UTC-5 (Eastern (EST))
  - Summer (DST): UTC-4 (EDT)
- ZIP code: 30401
- Area code: 478
- FIPS code: 13-57232
- GNIS feature ID: 0332536
- Website: cityofoakparkga.gov

Oak Park is a city in Emanuel County, Georgia, United States. The population was 484 at the 2010 census, up from 366 in 2000. By 2020, its population was 512.

== History ==
The town was originally named Sol, Georgia from June to August 1880 then the town name was changed to Horace, Georgia. The town name was later changed to Oak Park, Georgia in 1904.

In 1914 a murder–suicide committed by local farmer J.A. Eubanks got national news coverage. He murdered his wife and two daughters with an axe, set fire to some farm buildings, and shot himself in the head. Before killing himself, he woke a neighbor and told them what he had done. He did leave a suicide note. Several structures were destroyed in the fire, including the houses of others. He had even cut the rope for the well bucket to keep the fire from being put out.

In a December 14, 1934 municipal election, Oak Park elected a mayor and five-person town council composed entirely of women. The election of an all-woman government was a first for Georgia, and novel enough that the event was covered by Associated Press and United Press news stories, both calling it "Petticoat Rule". It was not a surprise to the town however, as the all-woman slate had been nominated by men when the previous mayor retired and no men volunteered to replace him.

Some in the town apparently dissented, as the jail was set ablaze the night before the election and dynamite blasts were set off after it, damaging buildings. Despite that, Mrs. Solomon S. Youmans (the wife of a local physician) was elected mayor, and the council consisted of Mrs. J.D. Tyson, Mrs. G.C. Corbin, Mrs. J.J. Powell, Mrs. G.C. Williamson and Miss Ada Belle Thompson.

== Geography ==
Oak Park is located in southern Emanuel County along U.S. Route 1. Interstate 16 passes through the northern part of the town.

According to the United States Census Bureau, Oak Park has a total area of 7.2 square miles (18.7 km^{2}), of which 7.1 square miles (18.3 km^{2}) is land and 0.15 square miles (0.4 km^{2}), or 2.17%, is water.

== Demographics ==
Historical population
Census	Pop.	Note	%±
1910	144		—
1920	195		35.4%
1930	291		49.2%
1940	208		−28.5%
1950	308		48.1%
1960	302		−1.9%
1970	226		−25.2%
1980	256		13.3%
1990	269		5.1%
2000	366		36.1%
2010	484		32.2%
2020	512		5.8%
U.S. Decennial Census

Oak Park racial composition as of 2020
Race	Num.	Perc.
White (non-Hispanic)	380	74.22%
Black or African American (non-Hispanic)	24	4.69%
Native American	3	0.59%
Asian	1	0.2%
Other/Mixed	18	3.52%
Hispanic or Latino	86	16.8%

As of the 2020 United States census, there were 512 people, 238 households, and 166 families residing in the town.
