= Georgia State Route 30 =

State highway in Georgia

State Route 30
- SR 30 highlighted in red

Route information
- Maintained by GDOT
- Length: 229.58 mi (369.47 km)
- Existed: 1919–present

Major junctions
- West end: SR 41 south-southeast of Buena Vista
- US 19 / US 280 / SR 3 / SR 27 in Americus; I-75 / US 41 / SR 7 / SR 90 in Cordele; US 319 / US 441 / SR 31 in McRae; US 23 / US 341 / SR 27 in McRae; US 1 / SR 4 in Lyons; US 25 / US 301 / SR 73 / SR 129 in Claxton; I-16 southwest of Blitchton; US 80 / US 280 / SR 26 in Blitchton; I-95 in Port Wentworth
- East end: SR 25 in Port Wentworth

Location
- Country: United States
- State: Georgia
- Counties: Marion, Sumter, Crisp, Wilcox, Dodge, Telfair, Wheeler, Montgomery, Toombs, Tattnall, Evans, Bryan, Effingham, Chatham

Highway system
- Georgia State Highway System; Interstate; US; State; Special
← SR 29	→ SR 31

State Route 30 (SR 30) is a 229.58-mile-long (369.47 km) state highway that travels west-to-east through portions of Marion, Sumter, Crisp, Wilcox, Dodge, Telfair, Wheeler, Montgomery, Toombs, Tattnall, Evans, Bryan, Effingham, and Chatham counties in the south-central part of the U.S. state of Georgia. The highway connects the southern part of Marion County with Port Wentworth, via Americus, Cordele, Abbeville, McRae, Vidalia, Reidsville, Claxton, and Pembroke. The highway is concurrent with U.S. Route 280 (US 280) for about four-fifths of its length, from Americus to Blitchton, which is the easternmost 183.9 miles (296.0 km) of US 280's length.

== Route description ==
=== Marion and Sumter counties ===
SR 30 begins at an intersection with SR 41 south-southeast of Buena Vista, in the south-central part of Marion County. The highway travels southeast through rural areas of the county and enters Sumter County. In Friendship is an intersection with SR 153. About 2.5 miles (4.0 km) later is the northern terminus of SR 45. Then, it continues to the southeast and curves to the east-northeast, to enter Americus. In the northern part of the city, it begins a concurrency with US 19/SR 3 (North Martin Luther King Boulevard). The three highways travel south-southeast, curve to the southwest, and reach West Lamar Street. At this intersection, SR 30 departs the concurrency by turning left onto US 280/SR 27/SR 49. In the main part of the city is an intersection with SR 377 (Lee Street). After passing Oak Grove Cemetery, SR 49 departs to the north on Tripp Street. Less than 3,000 feet (910 m) later, SR 27 departs to the east on Vienna Road, while US 280/SR 30 curve to the southeast. The concurrency passes Brickyard Plantation Golf Club and enters Leslie, where SR 195 (North Bailey Avenue) joins the concurrency. They curve to the east and enter De Soto. In this city, SR 195 departs the concurrency on North Luke Street. After a slight bend to the east-northeast, US 280/SR 30 travel through Cobb and cross over Lake Blackshear into Crisp County on the Gen. Howell Cobb–Capt. John A. Cobb Memorial Bridge.

=== Crisp and Wilcox counties ===
On the eastern side of the bridge, they skirt along the northern edge of Georgia Veterans State Park. After a short southeast section, they curve to the east. Then, they curve to the northeast and back to the east, where they enter Cordele. In downtown, they intersect US 41/SR 7/SR 90 (7th Street). At this intersection, SR 90 joins the concurrency. They gradually bend to the east-southeast and have an interchange with Interstate 75 (I-75). Less than 2,000 feet (610 m) later, SR 90 departs the concurrency. US 280/SR 30 travel in a fairly eastern routing and enter Wilcox County. They cross over the Alapaha River and enter Pitts. At 10th Street, they meet the northern terminus of SR 159. Just over 500 feet (150 m) later, SR 215 joins the concurrency. Shortly farther along their route, they enter Rochelle, where they intersect SR 112/SR 233 (Ashley Street). At this intersection, SR 215 leaves the concurrency to the south. After leaving the city, the concurrency travels to a northeastern direction and enters Abbeville, where is an intersection with US 129/SR 11 (Broad Street). Before leaving the city, they pass Riverside Cemetery. A little under 1 mile (1.6 km) after leaving the city, they cross over the Ocmulgee River into Dodge County.

=== Dodge and Telfair counties ===
In Copeland, they meet the southern terminus of SR 87. Farther along, in Rhine, is an intersection with SR 117/SR 165 (Central Street). At this intersection, SR 165 joins the concurrency. They travel through rural areas of the county and enter Milan, inside which the concurrency enters Telfair County. SR 165 departs the concurrency to the south on Mt. Zion Street. The concurrency heads east-northeast into McRae. In the southern part of town, they intersect US 319/US 441/SR 31, which join the concurrency. In downtown, the five highways intersect US 23/US 341/SR 27. Right after leaving town, they cross over the Little Ocmulgee River into Wheeler County.

=== Wheeler and Montgomery counties ===
On the southeastern corner of Little Ocmulgee State Park, US 280/SR 30 continue to the northeast, while the other three routes turn to the north-northeast. In Erick, the concurrency meets the northern terminus of SR 149. Then, in Alamo, is an intersection with SR 126 (Commerce Street). In Glenwood is an intersection with SR 19 (2nd Street). Then, they cross over the Oconee River on the LCPL Melvin Poole Memorial Bridge into Montgomery County. In Mount Vernon is an intersection with US 221/SR 56 (Railroad Avenue). The concurrency travels through nearby Ailey and enters Higgston. Here is an intersection with SR 15/SR 29 (James Street), which join the concurrency. This intersection also marks the northern terminus of SR 135. The four highways enter Vidalia and, a short distance later, enter Toombs County. At Adams Street, they intersect SR 130. At Jackson Street, SR 15/SR 29 depart the concurrency to the south-southwest, while US 280/SR 30 continue to the southeast, traveling south of Meadows Regional Medical Center and north of Vidalia Regional Airport. In nearby Lyons is an intersection with US 1/SR 4 (State Street). Then, they curve to the southeast and leave the city. They travel through rural areas of the county and enter Tattnall County.

=== Tattnall and Evans counties ===
Farther to the southeast, they skirt along the southwestern edge of Gordonia-Alatamaha State Park and enter Reidsville. There, US 280/SR 30 meet the southern terminus of SR 56 (Shepards Bridge Road) before they curve to the northeast. Almost immediately after the end of the curve is the northern terminus SR 147 (Tattnall Street). About 1,000 feet (300 m) later is an intersection with SR 23/SR 57/SR 121 (Main Street). The concurrent highway continue to the northeast, traveling south of Manassas and curve to the east to enter Evans County. In Bellville, is an intersection with SR 169 (Smith Street). Just outside the eastern city limits is the eastern terminus of SR 292. They travel through Hagan before entering Claxton. At North Ralph Street, SR 129 joins the concurrency. Just under 3,000 feet (910 m) later is an intersection with US 25/US 301/SR 73 (Duval Street). At South River Street, SR 129 departs from the concurrency to the south. In Daisy, they meet the northern terminus of former SR 250 (now known as Ellerbee Avenue). Farther to the east-southeast, they cross over the Canoochee River into Bryan County on the Moores Bridge.

=== Bryan County ===
US 280/SR 30 pass the Jerry Bacon Recreational Park. Continuing east-southeast, they enter Pembroke. At Main Street, SR 67 (from the left side of the concurrent highways) and SR 119 (from the right side) both join the concurrency. One block later, at College Street, those two highways depart the concurrency, traveling in opposite directions from how they joined (SR 67 turns right, while SR 119 turns left). Farther along, in Lanier, they meet the western terminus of SR 204 and curve to a more northeasterly direction. They travel southeast of Black Creek Golf Course. Then, they have an interchange with I-16 (Jim Gillis Historic Savannah Parkway). Just over 1 mile (1.6 km) later, in Blitchton, they intersect US 80/SR 26. At this intersection, US 280 reaches its eastern terminus, and SR 30 turns right onto US 80/SR 26 east. The three highways cross over the Ogeechee River into Effingham County.

=== Effingham and Chatham counties ===
After traveling through Eden, they intersect SR 17. At this intersection, US 80/SR 26/SR 17 south continue to the east-southeast, while SR 17/SR 30 travel to the north-northwest. Approximately 3 miles (4.8 km) later, SR 30 splits off to the southeast on Noel C. Conaway Road. It curves to the northeast and back to a fairly eastward routing. Farther along, it enters Port Wentworth at the Chatham County line. North-northwest of the main part of town, it intersects SR 21 (Augusta Road). The two routes head concurrently to the south-southeast and have an interchange with I-95 (Tom Coleman Highway). They meet Jimmy DeLoach Parkway, which is the southern terminus of SR 17 and the northern terminus of SR 21 Alternate (SR 21 Alt.). At Bonnybridge Road, SR 30 turns left and departs the concurrency. It travels underneath, but does not have an interchange with SR 21 Alt. (Jimmy DeLoach Connector). Just over 4,000 feet (1,200 m) after departing from SR 21, it meets its eastern terminus, an intersection with SR 25 (Coastal Highway).

=== National Highway System ===
There are two portions of SR 30 that are part of the National Highway System, a system of routes determined to be the most important for the nation's economy, mobility, and defense:

- From the western end of the US 19/SR 3 concurrency in Americus to where US 280/SR 30 meet I-95, just southwest of Blitchton
- All of SR 30, from the western end of the SR 21 concurrency in Port Wentworth, to its eastern terminus

== History ==
=== 1920s and 1930s ===
SR 30 was established at least as early as 1919 on its current path from SR 7 in Cordele to the approximate location of Daisy, then east-southeast to SR 38 in Clyde, and then southeast, east-northeast, and northeast to Savannah. At this time, part of SR 26 was established from Blitchton to Savannah. By the end of September 1921, SR 63 was established from SR 30 in Ellabell northeast to SR 26 in Blitchton. The eastern terminus of SR 38 was truncated to SR 25 in Midway. Its former path was redesignated as a northern extension of SR 25. By October 1926, the western terminus of SR 30 was extended northwest to SR 28 west of Vienna. The western terminus of SR 63 was shifted westward to Lanier. US 80 was designated on SR 26 from Blitchton to Savannah. The eastern terminus of SR 30 was truncated to US 17/SR 25 southeast of Clyde. Its former path was redesignated as a northern extension of SR 25, with US 17 designated on it. Between October 1929 and June 1930, the western terminus of SR 30 was shifted west-southwestward to Americus. The western terminus of SR 63 was shifted westward to Pembroke. Between November 1930 and January 1932, US 280 was designated on SR 30 from Americus to Pembroke, on the entire length of SR 63 from Pembroke to Blitchton, and on US 80/SR 26 from Blitchton to Savannah. In the third quarter of 1937, the paths of SR 30, from Pembroke to southeast of Clyde, and SR 63 were swapped.

=== 1940s to 1980s ===
In 1942, the eastern terminus of US 280 was truncated to Blitchton. The next year, the western terminus of SR 30 was extended northwest to SR 41 south of Buena Vista. Between January 1945 and November 1946, the eastern terminus of SR 30 was extended southeastward on US 80/SR 26 from Blitchton to the southern part of Effingham County, north-northwestward on SR 167 for a short distance, eastward to SR 21 north-northwest of Industrial City Gardens, south-southeastward on SR 21 for a short distance, and eastward to the Savannah National Wildlife Refuge. Between August 1950 and January 1952, SR 167 was redesignated as SR 17. Between June 1963 and January 1966, the entire length of SR 30 was hard surfaced. In 1973, SR 704 was proposed from SR 30 west-northwest of Monteith east-northeast to SR 21 north-northwest of Monteith. Between January 1979 and March 1980, the path of SR 30 in the Monteith area was shifted northward, replacing the proposed path of SR 704.

== Major intersections ==
County	Location	mi	km	Destinations	Notes
Marion		0.000	0.000	SR 41 – Preston, Buena Vista	Western terminus
Sumter	Friendship	7.203	11.592	SR 153 – Preston, Ellaville	
Sumter		9.658	15.543	County Road 45 – Plains	Former SR 45
Sumter	Americus	19.128	30.784	US 19 north / SR 3 north (North Martin Luther King Jr. Boulevard) / Patterson Street east – Ellaville	Western end of US 19/SR 3 concurrency; western terminus of Patterson Street
Sumter	Americus	19.962	32.126	US 19 south / US 280 west / SR 3 south / SR 27 west / SR 49 south (South Martin Luther King Jr. Boulevard) – Plains, Albany, Dawson, Jimmy Carter National Historic Site, Sumter Regional Hospital	Eastern end of US 19/SR 3 concurrency; western end of US 280, SR 49, and SR 27 concurrencies
Sumter	Americus	20.610	33.169	SR 377 south (North Lee Street)	Northern terminus of SR 377
Sumter	Americus	21.487	34.580	SR 49 north (Tripp Street / Crawford Street) – Andersonville, Oglethorpe, Andersonville Nat'l. Hist. Site, South Georgia Technical College, Georgia Southwestern State University, Jimmy Carter Regional Airport	Eastern end of SR 49 concurrency
Sumter	Americus	22.135	35.623	SR 27 east (Vienna Road) – Vienna	Eastern end of SR 27 concurrency
Sumter	Leslie	33.062	53.208	SR 118 west (Bailey Avenue) / SR 195 south – Leesburg, Leslie	Western end of SR 195 concurrency; eastern terminus of SR 118
Sumter	De Soto	34.611	55.701	SR 195 north (North Luke Street) – Andersonville	Eastern end of SR 195 concurrency
Lake Blackshear		42.284	68.050	Gen. Howell Cobb–Capt. John A. Cobb Memorial Bridge; Sumter–Crisp county line	
Crisp		50.037	80.527	SR 300 Conn. south (Old Albany Road) – Albany, Camilla	Northern terminus of SR 300 Conn.
Crisp	Cordele	51.568	82.991	US 41 / SR 90 west (7th Street / SR 7) – Ashburn, Vienna, Historic Downtown Cordele	Western end of SR 90 concurrency
Crisp	Cordele	53.435	85.995	I-75 (SR 401) – Valdosta, Macon	I-75/SR 401 exit 101
Crisp	Cordele	53.767	86.530	SR 90 east – South Ga. Tech. Col. Crisp Co. Center	Eastern end of SR 90 concurrency
Wilcox		64.930	104.495	Alapaha River	
Wilcox	Pitts	66.184	106.513	SR 159 south (10th Street) – Rebecca, Ashburn	Northern terminus of SR 159
Wilcox	Pitts	66.299	106.698	SR 215 north (8th Street) – Vienna	Western end of SR 215 concurrency
Wilcox		67.330	108.357	Cleveland Avenue west	Eastern terminus of Cleveland Avenue; former SR 30 Conn.
Wilcox	Rochelle	71.309	114.761	SR 112 / SR 233 (Ashley Street) – Rebecca, Hawkinsville	
Wilcox	Rochelle	71.403	114.912	SR 215 south (Gordon Street) – Fitzgerald	Eastern end of SR 215 concurrency
Wilcox	Abbeville	80.788	130.016	US 129 (Broad Street / SR 11) – Fitzgerald, Hawkinsville, Wilcox State Prison	
Ocmulgee River		82.443	132.679	Wilcox–Dodge county line	
Dodge		84.394	135.819	SR 87 north (Abbeville Highway) – Eastman	Southern terminus of SR 87
Dodge	Rhine	87.285	140.472	SR 117 / SR 165 north (Central Street North) – Jacksonville, Eastman	Western end of SR 165 concurrency
Telfair	Milan	95.814	154.198	SR 165 south (Mt. Zion Street)	Eastern end of SR 165 concurrency
Telfair	McRae–Helena	105.205	169.311	US 319 south / US 441 south / SR 31 south – Fitzgerald, Douglas	Western end of US 319/US 441/SR 31 concurrency
Telfair	McRae–Helena	106.639	171.619	US 23 south / US 341 south (Oak Street / SR 27 south)	One-way pair
Telfair	McRae–Helena	106.691	171.703	US 23 north / US 341 north (Railroad Street / SR 27 north) – Eastman	One-way pair
Little Ocmulgee River		107.860	173.584	Telfair–Wheeler county line	
Wheeler		108.283	174.265	US 319 north / US 441 north / SR 31 north – Dublin	Eastern end of US 319/US 441/SR 31 concurrency
Wheeler		114.139	183.689	SR 149 south (Scotland Road) – Scotland	Northern terminus of SR 149
Wheeler	Alamo	116.150	186.925	SR 126 (Commerce Street) – Lumber City, Cadwell	
Wheeler	Glenwood	122.973	197.906	SR 19 (2nd Street) to I-16 (SR 404) – Lumber City, Dublin	Former SR 15
Oconee River		125.418	201.841	LCPL Melvin Poole Memorial Bridge; Wheeler–Montgomery county line	
Montgomery	Mount Vernon	127.906	205.845	US 221 / SR 56 (Railroad Avenue) – Uvalda, Soperton, Montgomery State Prison	
Montgomery	Higgston	136.215	219.217	SR 15 north / SR 29 north (James Street) / SR 135 south – Uvalda, Tarrytown, Soperton	Western end of SR 15/SR 29 concurrency; northern terminus of SR 135
Toombs	Vidalia	139.259	224.116	SR 130 (Adams Street / Montgomery Street) – Uvalda	No access to SR 130 from US 280 west/SR 15 north/SR 29 north/SR 30 west or vice versa
Toombs	Vidalia	139.531	224.553	SR 15 south / SR 29 south (Jackson Street) – Baxley	Eastern end of SR 15/SR 29 concurrency
Toombs	Lyons	144.959	233.289	US 1 / SR 4 (South State Street) – Baxley, Swainsboro	
Toombs		153.719	247.387	SR 86 west (Earl Kemp Road) – Oak Park	Eastern terminus of SR 86
Tattnall	Reidsville	159.201	256.209	SR 56 west (Tootle Avenue) – Uvalda	Eastern terminus of SR 56
Tattnall	Reidsville	160.095	257.648	SR 147 west (Tattnall Street) – State Prison	Eastern terminus of SR 147
Tattnall	Reidsville	160.254	257.904	SR 23 / SR 57 / SR 121 (Main Street) – Glennville, Metter	
Evans	Bellville	170.110	273.766	SR 169 (Smith Street) – Jesup, Bellville	
Evans	Bellville	170.651	274.636	SR 292 west – Collins, Lyons	Eastern terminus of SR 292
Evans	Claxton	173.772	279.659	SR 129 north (Ralph Street) – Metter	Western end of SR 129 concurrency
Evans	Claxton	174.346	280.583	US 25 / US 301 (Duval Street / SR 73) – Glennville, Statesboro	
Evans	Claxton	174.556	280.921	SR 129 south (South River Street)	Eastern end of SR 129 concurrency
Canoochee River		181.701	292.419	Moores Bridge; Evans–Bryan county line	
Bryan	Pembroke	191.046	307.459	SR 67 north / SR 119 south (Main Street) to I-16 (SR 404)	Western end of SR 67/SR 119 concurrency
Bryan	Pembroke	191.095	307.538	SR 67 south / SR 119 north (College Street) to I-16 (SR 404) – Springfield	Eastern end of SR 67/SR 119 concurrency
Bryan	Lanier	195.907	315.282	SR 204 east to I-95 (SR 405) – Ellabell	Western terminus of SR 204
Bryan		201.879	324.893	I-16 (SR 404 / Jim L. Gillis Historic Savannah Parkway) – Macon, Savannah	I-16/SR 404 exit 143
Bryan	Blitchton	203.577	327.625	US 80 west / SR 26 west / US 280 ends – Statesboro	Eastern end of US 280 concurrency; eastern terminus of US 280; western end of US 80/SR 26 concurrency
Ogeechee River		204.946	329.829	Bryan–Effingham county line	
Effingham		210.466	338.712	US 80 east / SR 26 east / SR 17 south to I-16 (SR 404) / I-95 (SR 405) – Savannah	Eastern end of US 80/SR 26 concurrency; western end of SR 17 concurrency
Effingham		214.773	345.644	SR 17 north – Guyton	Eastern end of SR 17 concurrency
Chatham	Port Wentworth	225.385	362.722	SR 21 north (Augusta Road) – Rincon, Springfield	Western end of SR 21 concurrency
Chatham	Port Wentworth	225.923	363.588	I-95 (SR 405 / Tom Coleman Highway) – Jacksonville, Florence	I-95/SR 405 exit 109
Chatham	Port Wentworth	228.107	367.103	SR 21 Alt. south (Jimmy DeLoach Connector south) to SR 17 north / I-95 (SR 405)	Northern terminus of SR 21 Alt. and Jimmy DeLoach Connector; southern terminus of SR 17; eastern terminus of Jimmy DeLoach Parkway; Sonny Dixon Interchange
Chatham	Port Wentworth	228.644	367.967	SR 21 south – Savannah, Savannah/Hilton Head International Airport	Eastern end of SR 21 concurrency
Chatham	Port Wentworth	229.581	369.475	SR 25 (Ocean Highway) – Hardeeville, Savannah	Eastern terminus
1.000 mi = 1.609 km; 1.000 km = 0.621 mi: Concurrency terminus; Incomplete access

== Pitts connector route ==
State Route 30 Connector
- Location: Pitts
- Existed: 1965–1997

State Route 30 Connector (SR 30 Conn.) was a connector route of SR 30 that partially existed in the city limits of Pitts. Between June 1963 and January 1966, it was established on Cleveland Avenue from SR 215 in Pitts east and southeast to US 280/SR 30/SR 215 east of the city. In 1997, it was decommissioned.

The entire route was in Wilcox County.

Location	mi	km	Destinations	Notes
Pitts			SR 215	Western terminus
			US 280 / SR 30 / SR 215	Eastern terminus
1.000 mi = 1.609 km; 1.000 km = 0.621 mi
