= Montgomery County School District (Georgia) =

School district in Georgia (U.S. state)

Address
- 305 S Richardson St. Mount Vernon, Georgia, 30445; United States
- Coordinates: 32.191884°N 82.556591°W

District information
- Grades: Pre-school - 12
- Superintendent: Lynn Batten
- Accreditations: Southern Association of Colleges and Schools; Georgia Accrediting Commission

Students and staff
- Enrollment: 1,294
- Faculty: 83

Other information
- Telephone: (912) 583-2301
- Fax: (912) 583-4822
- Website: www.montgomery.k12.ga.us

The Montgomery County School District is a public school district in Montgomery County, Georgia, United States, based in Mount Vernon. It serves the communities of Ailey, Alston, Higgston, Mount Vernon, Tarrytown, Uvalda, and Vidalia.

== Schools ==
The Montgomery County School District has one elementary school, one middle school, and one high school.

=== Elementary school ===
- Montgomery County Elementary School

=== Middle school ===
- Montgomery County Middle School

=== High school ===
- Montgomery County High School. Their mascot is the Eagles. Sports available include baseball, football, wrestling, and basketball.

The school has received national attention in the New York Times for unofficially sponsoring separate, segregated proms for white and black students. Though many students are comfortable with the concept of an integrated prom, many parents have repeatedly blocked measures to sponsor such an event.
