= Vidalia micropolitan area, Georgia =

Vidalia Micropolitan Area
- Micropolitan Statistical Area
- Vidalia, GA Micropolitan Statistical Area
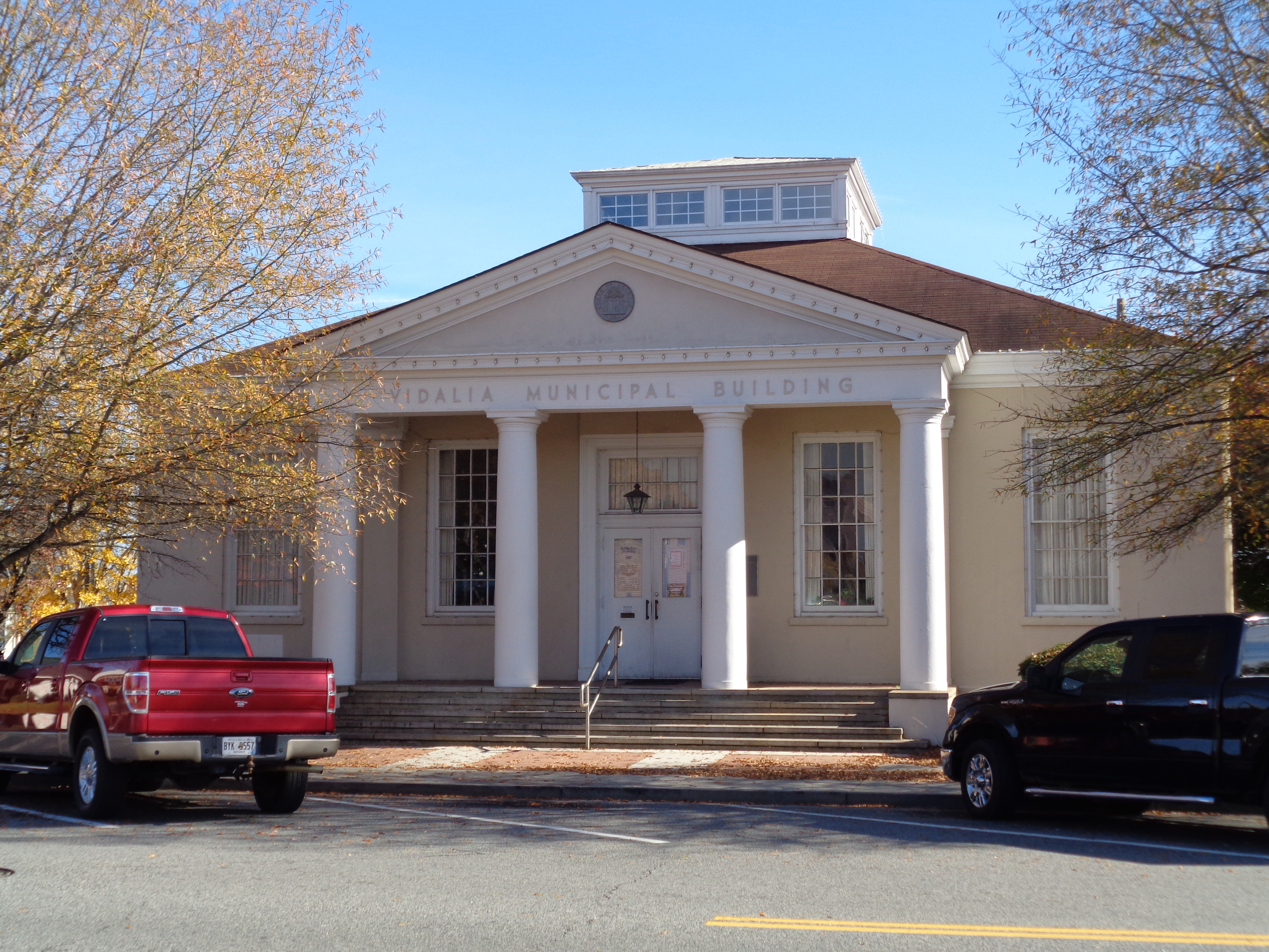
- Vidalia Municipal Building (2015)
- Motto: "The Sweet Onion City"
Interactive Map of Vidalia, GA μSA
City of Vidalia
Vidalia, GA μSA
- Country: United States
- State: Georgia
- Largest city: Vidalia
- Time zone: UTC−5 (EST)
  - Summer (DST): UTC−4 (EDT)

The Vidalia Micropolitan Statistical Area, as defined by the United States Census Bureau, is an area consisting of two counties in Georgia (Montgomery and Toombs), anchored by the city of Vidalia, the largest city in Toombs County.

As of the 2000 census, the μSA had a population of 34,337 (though a July 1, 2009 estimate placed the population at 36,889).

== Counties ==
- Montgomery
- Toombs

== Communities ==
- Cities
  - Ailey
  - Lyons
  - Mount Vernon
  - Santa Claus
  - Vidalia (Principal city)
  - Uvalda
- Towns
  - Alston
  - Higgston
- Village
  - Tarrytown

== Demographics ==
As of the census of 2000, there were 34,337 people, 12,796 households, and 8,888 families residing within the μSA. The racial makeup of the μSA was 69.30% White, 24.90% African American, 0.17% Native American, 0.40% Asian, 0.01% Pacific Islander, 4.57% from other races, and 0.65% from two or more races. Hispanic or Latino of any race were 7.52% of the population.

The median income for a household in the μSA was $28,526, and the median income for a family was $36,448. Males had a median income of $27,280 versus $19,697 for females. The per capita income for the μSA was $14,217.

== See also ==
- Georgia census statistical areas
