= U.S. Route 280 =

Highway in the United States

U.S. Route 280
- US 280 highlighted in red

Route information
- Auxiliary route of US 80
- Maintained by ALDOT and GDOT
- Length: 388.5 mi (625.2 km)
- Existed: January 1954–present

Major junctions
- West end: I-20 / I-59 / US 31 in Birmingham, AL
- I-459 in Hoover, AL; US 231 from Harpersville to Sylacauga, AL; I-85 / US 29 / US 431 in Opelika, AL; I-185 in Columbus, GA; US 19 in Americus, GA; I-75 in Cordele, GA; US 23 / US 319 / US 341 / US 441 in McRae-Helena, GA; US 1 in Lyons, GA; US 25 / US 301 in Claxton, GA; I-16 near Black Creek, GA
- East end: US 80 / SR 26 / SR 30 in Blitchton, GA

Location
- Country: United States
- States: Alabama, Georgia
- Counties: AL: Jefferson, Shelby, Talladega, Coosa, Tallapoosa, Chambers, Lee, Russell; GA: Muscogee, Stewart, Webster, Sumter, Crisp, Wilcox, Dodge, Telfair, Wheeler, Montgomery, Toombs, Tattnall, Evans, Bryan

Highway system
- United States Numbered Highway System; List; Special; Divided

U.S. Route 280 (US 280) is a spur of U.S. Highway 80 (US 80). It currently runs for 388.5 miles (625.2 km) from Blitchton, Georgia, at US 80 to Birmingham, Alabama at Interstate 20 (I-20)/Interstate 59 (I-59). For much of its route, US 280 travels through rural areas and smaller cities in southern Georgia and east central Alabama. Once the highway approaches Birmingham, it is a major suburban route. Numerous shopping centers are located on US 280 throughout northern Shelby County and southern Jefferson County.

US 280 is the main connector between Birmingham and Auburn, and this stretch is sometimes known as the "War Eagle Highway."

Through Talladega County, Alabama, US 280 is known as the Jim Nabors Highway, in honor of the Sylacauga, Alabama, native known for portraying the television character Gomer Pyle. The historical designation of US 280 and Alabama SR 38 is the Florida Short Route.

For many years, US 280 and SR 38 were considered one of the more dangerous routes in Alabama, due to the number of large stretches of narrow two-lane roadway leading southeast from Birmingham. Work was completed in 2006 making US 280 a four-lane highway throughout the entire state of Alabama. This project began in the 1970s. As a result, US 280 now bypasses numerous small towns in east Alabama, including Goodwater, Jackson's Gap, Camp Hill, and Waverly.

In Georgia, US 280 from Columbus to Interstate 16 (I-16) is also a Governor's Road Improvement Program (GRIP) corridor known as "Power Alley".

== Route description ==
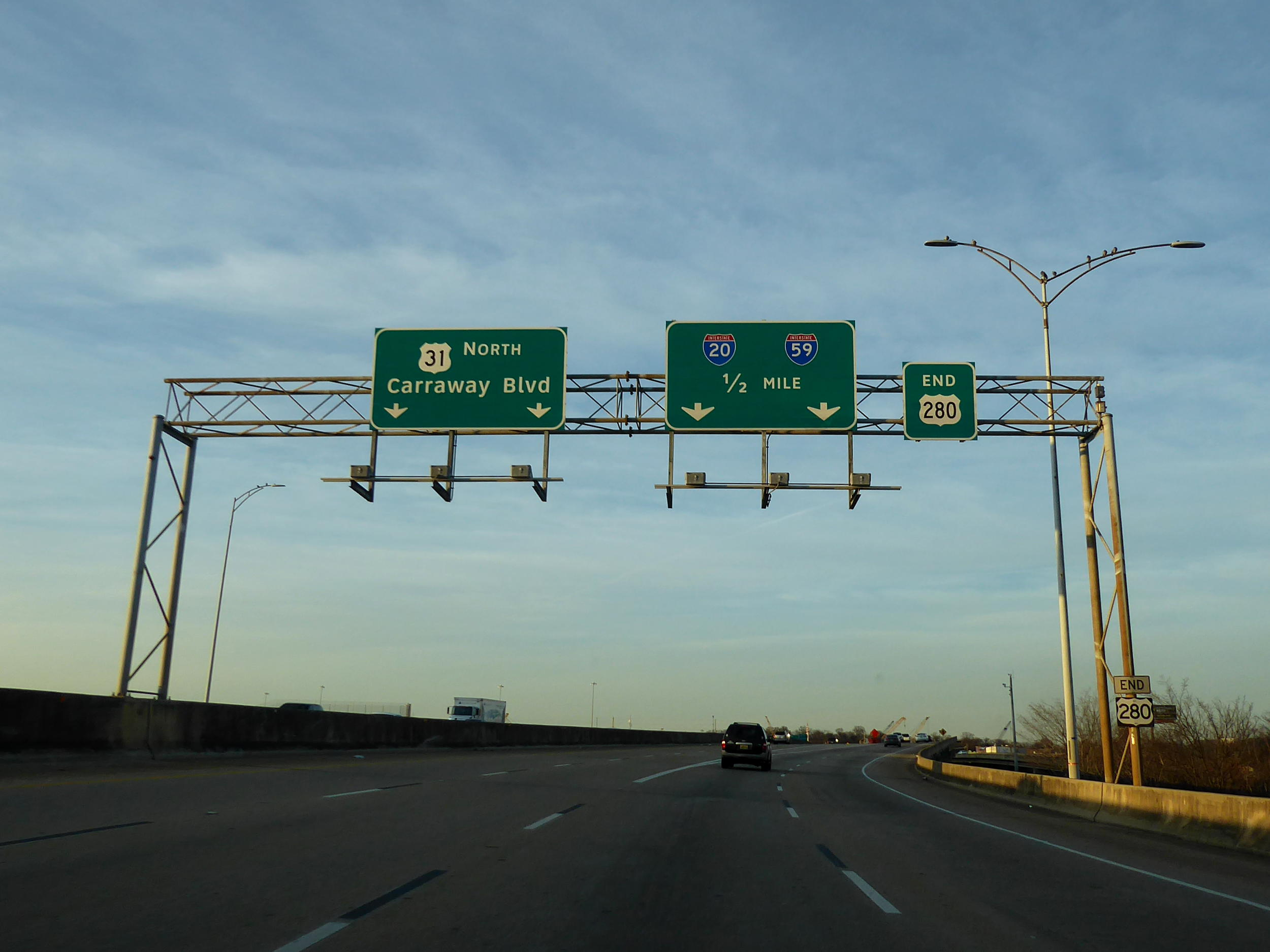
Western terminus at Interstates 20 & 59 in Birmingham.

=== Alabama ===
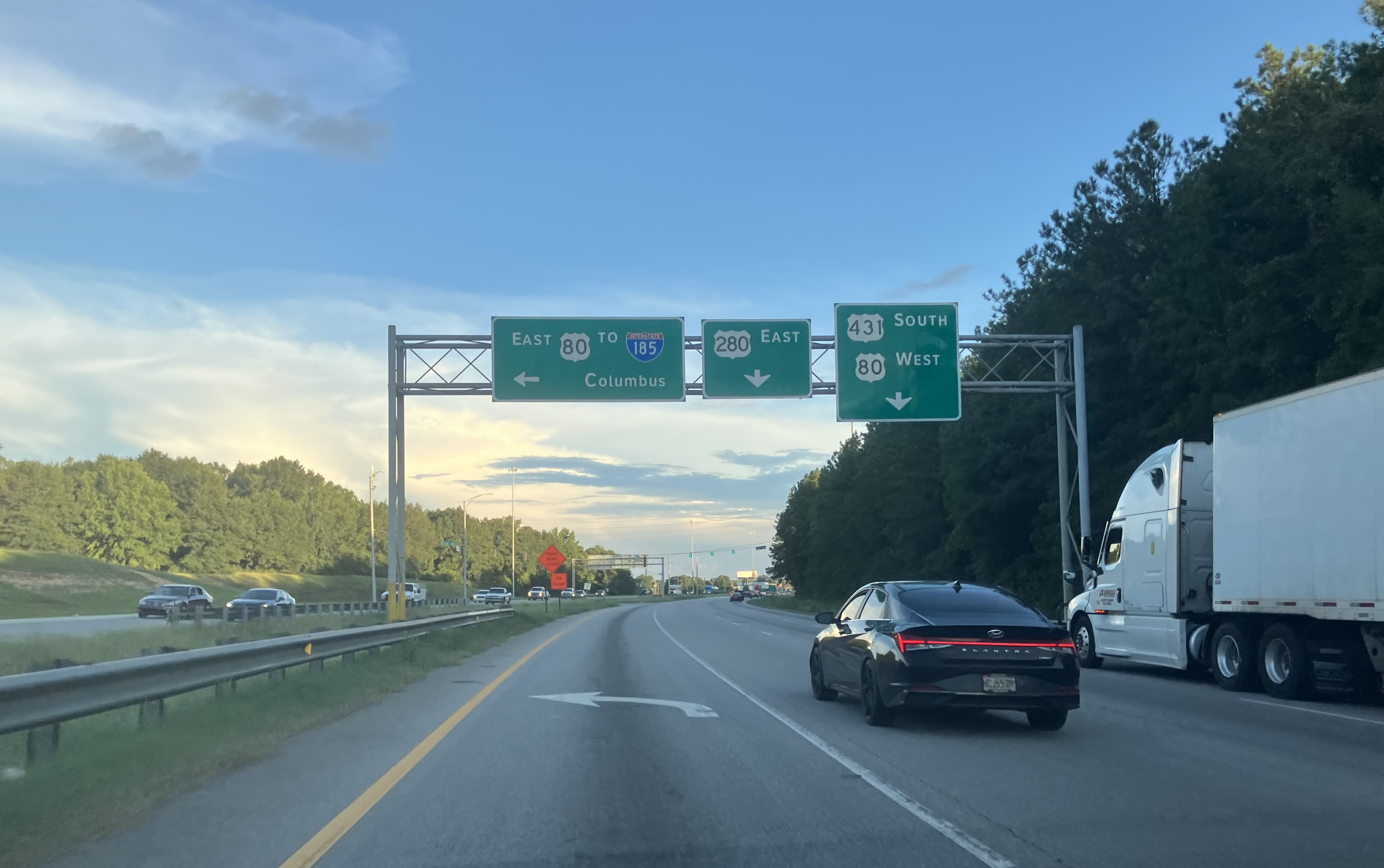
The wrong-way concurrency of US 80/US 431/US 280 in Phenix City, Alabama

US 280 terminates concurrently with U.S. Route 31 (US 31) at Interstate 20 (I-20)/Interstate 59 (I-59) at the northern end of the Red Mountain Expressway. US 280 has the unsigned designation of Alabama State Route 38 (SR 38) throughout its length in Alabama. After following US 31 to Homewood, it turns off onto its own right-of-way, crossing Interstate 459 and traversing Double Oak Mountain before descending through Chelsea into the Coosa River Valley, where it serves Harpersville, Childersburg, and Sylacauga. Outside Sylacauga, it becomes an expressway, crossing the southernmost extent of the Appalachian Mountains to Alexander City. After crossing the Tallapoosa River, it follows a rolling, curvy route through the Lower Piedmont, bypassing the towns of Jackson's Gap, Dadeville, Camp Hill, and Waverly before entering the Columbus Metropolitan Area.

After bypassing Auburn, it engages in a concurrency with Interstate 85 in Opelika before turning east in a concurrency with US 431. It descends to Phenix City before leaving US 431 and crossing the Chattahoochee River into Georgia.

=== Georgia ===
US 280 begins in Georgia at the state's border with Alabama in Columbus. There it is paired with Georgia State Route 520 (SR 520) and U.S. Route 27 (US 27). It maintains this designation as it passes through Fort Benning. Upon arriving in Cusseta, US 280/SR 520 diverge from US 27 and continue southeast to Richland, where US 280 splits off from SR 520. US 280 continues east, passing through Plains (the boyhood home of Jimmy Carter) and becomes cosigned with Georgia State Route 30 (SR 30) in Americus. US 280/SR 30 then continue east-southeast, crossing Interstate 75 (I-75) in Cordele, still continuing east through mainly rural areas of the southern portion of the state, passing through smaller towns such as McRae–Helena, Mount Vernon, Vidalia, and Pembroke. The highway then turns to the northeast as it leaves Pembroke, crossing Interstate 16 (I-16) at exit 143. Still continuing northeast, the highway then terminates in Blichton at US 80.

=== National Highway System ===
Except for the easternmost portion between I-16 and the eastern terminus, the entire length of US 280 is part of the National Highway System, a system of routes determined to be the most important for the nation's economy, mobility, and defense.

== History ==
Prior to the completion of the Elton B. Stephens Expressway in Birmingham, US 31, US 78, and US 280 traveled concurrently until they intersected US 11 at the intersection of 1st Avenue North and 24th Street.

== Major intersections ==
State	County	Location	mi	km	Destinations	Notes
Alabama	Jefferson	Birmingham	0.000	0.000	I-20 / I-59 / US 31 north (Carraway Boulevard / SR 3) – Tuscaloosa, Atlanta, Gadsden	Western terminus; western end of US 31/SR 3 concurrency; I-20/I-59 exit 126A
Alabama	Jefferson	Birmingham	0.729	1.173	2nd Avenue North	Westbound exit and eastbound entrance
Alabama	Jefferson	Birmingham	0.835	1.344	US 11 (1st Avenue North / SR 7)	Westbound exit only
Alabama	Jefferson	Birmingham	1.245	2.004	US 78 (3rd–4th Avenue South / SR 4)	
Alabama	Jefferson	Birmingham	1.598	2.572	University Boulevard	
Alabama	Jefferson	Birmingham			Highland Avenue / Arlington Avenue	Westbound exit and eastbound entrance
Alabama	Jefferson	Birmingham			21st Avenue South	Eastbound exit and westbound entrance
Alabama	Jefferson	Homewood	3.331	5.361	US 31 south (SR 3 south) / SR 38 east / Rosedale Drive – Montgomery, Homewood	Eastern end of US 31/SR 3 concurrency; western end of SR 38 concurrency; western terminus of SR 38
Alabama	Jefferson	Birmingham–Homewood line			Hollywood Boulevard – Mountain Brook, Birmingham Zoo–Gardens	Eastern end of freeway
Alabama	Jefferson	Mountain Brook	4.737	7.623	SR 149 – Homewood, Mountain Brook, Samford University	Interchange
Alabama	Jefferson	Mountain Brook			Pump House Road – Cahaba Heights	Interchange
Alabama	Jefferson	Birmingham	7.899	12.712	I-459 – Atlanta, Gadsden, Montgomery, Tuscaloosa	I-459 exit 19
Alabama	Jefferson	Birmingham			Colonnade Drive	Interchange
Alabama	Shelby	Hoover	11.819	19.021	SR 119 (Cahaba Valley Road) – Leeds, Oak Mountain State Park, Lake Purdy	
Alabama	Shelby	Harpersville	29.431	47.365	US 231 north (SR 53 north) / SR 25 – Vincent, Wilsonville, Pell City	Western end of US 231/SR 53 concurrency
Alabama	Shelby	Harpersville	34.437	55.421	SR 76 west (Klein Road) – Columbiana, Montevallo	Western end of SR 76 concurrency
Alabama	Talladega	Childersburg	35.523	57.169	SR 235 north (Coosa Pines Road)	Southern terminus of SR 235
Alabama	Talladega	Childersburg	36.109	58.112	SR 76 east (1st Street) / CR 008 west – Childersburg, Fayetteville, Kymulga Covered Bridge and Grist Mill, Talladega College Historic District, DeSoto Caverns	Eastern end of SR 76 concurrency; eastern terminus of CR 008
Alabama	Talladega	Sylacauga	47.310	76.138	US 231 south (SR 53) / SR 21 – Sylacauga, Montgomery	Eastern end of US 231/SR 53 concurrency; interchange
Alabama	Coosa	Socapatoy	63.362	101.971	SR 9 – Wetumpka, Goodwater	Interchange
Alabama	Coosa	Kellyton	65.221	104.963	SR 115 south / Firehouse Road – Kellyton	Northern terminus of SR 115
Alabama	Tallapoosa	Alexander City	70.096	112.809	SR 22 west (Rockford Highway) – Rockford, Historic Downtown Alexander City, Charles E. Bailey Sportplex	Western end of SR 22 concurrency
Alabama	Tallapoosa	Alexander City	71.788	115.532	SR 22 east / SR 63 (Cherokee Road) – Alex City, Eclectic, Central Alabama Community College, Wind Creek State Park, Historic Downtown Alexander City	Eastern end of SR 22 concurrency
Alabama	Tallapoosa	Dadeville	83.501	134.382	SR 49 north (Horseshoe Bend Road) – New Site, Horseshoe Bend National Military Park	Western end of SR 49 concurrency
Alabama	Tallapoosa	Dadeville	84.821	136.506	SR 49 south (North Broadnax Street) – Dadeville Business District, StillWaters, Tallapoosa County Historical Museum	Eastern end of SR 49 concurrency
Alabama	Tallapoosa	Camp Hill			SR 50 east / CR 34 west – Camp Hill, Lyman Ward, StillWaters, Camp Hill Business District	Western end of SR 50 concurrency; eastern terminus of CR 34
Alabama	Tallapoosa	Camp Hill	91.488	147.236	SR 50 west – Lyman Ward, Girls Ranch	Eastern end of SR 50 concurrency
Alabama	Chambers	No major junctions				
Alabama	Lee	Auburn	104.511	168.194	SR 147 north (Heath Road) – LaFayette	Western end of SR 147 concurrency
Alabama	Lee	The Bottle	104.911	168.838	SR 147 south (North College Street) – Auburn	Eastern end of SR 147 concurrency
Alabama	Lee	Opelika	110.241	177.416	Pepperell Parkway	Former US 29
Alabama	Lee	Opelika	111.851	180.007	I-85 south / US 29 south (SR 15) – Montgomery	Western end of I-85/US 29/SR 15 concurrency; US 280 west follows exit 58.
Alabama	Lee	Opelika	113.871	183.258	SR 51 to SR 169 – Opelika, Hurtsboro	I-85 exit 60
Alabama	Lee	Opelika	115.294	185.548	I-85 north / US 29 north (SR 15) / US 431 north (Columbus Parkway / SR 1) – Atlanta, Opelika, Southern Union State Community College	Eastern end of I-85/US 29/SR 15 concurrency; western end of US 431/SR 1 concurrency; US 280 east follows exit 62.
Alabama	Russell	Phenix City	137.659	221.541	US 80 east (SR 8) to I-185 – Columbus	Western end of US 80/SR 8 concurrency
Alabama	Russell	Phenix City	138.598	223.052	US 80 west (Crawford Road / SR 8) – Montgomery	Eastern end of US 80/SR 8 concurrency
Alabama	Russell	Phenix City	140.466	226.058	US 431 south (SR 1) – Eufaula, Dothan	Eastern end of US 431/SR 1 concurrency; interchange
Alabama	Russell	Phenix City			Colin L. Powell Parkway / Seale Road	Interchange
Chattahoochee River			141.356 0.000	227.490 0.000	Oglethorpe Bridge; Alabama–Georgia state line; western end of GA SR 520 concurrency	
Georgia	Muscogee	Columbus	0.444	0.715	US 27 north / SR 1 north (Veterans Parkway) – Hamilton, Waverly Hall, Airport	Western end of US 27/SR 1 concurrency
Georgia	Muscogee	Columbus	5.836	9.392	I-185 north (SR 411) / Fort Benning Main Entrance (Lindsey Creek Parkway) – LaGrange, Atlanta	West end of freeway; I-185 exit 1; southern terminus of I-185; Ft. Benning exit ramp provides access to Columbus Airport
Georgia	Muscogee	Columbus	6.612	10.641	Cusetta Road / Sand Hill	Split into two separate exits eastbound
Georgia	Upatoi Creek		7.726	12.434	Bridge	
Georgia	Chattahoochee	Fort Benning	10.156	16.344	8th Division Road Access Point	Interchange
Georgia	Chattahoochee	Fort Benning	15.922	25.624	SR 26 east – Buena Vista, Camp Darby, Andersonville National Historic Site	At-grade intersection; east end of freeway; western terminus of SR 26
Georgia	Chattahoochee	Cusseta	16.416	26.419	Broad Street	Former SR 520 Bus. east
Georgia	Chattahoochee	Cusseta	17.395	27.995	US 27 south / SR 1 south – Lumpkin, Westville, River Bend Park	Eastern end of US 27/SR 1 concurrency
Georgia	Stewart	Richland	35.025	56.367	SR 520 east / SR 27 west – Dawson, Lumpkin	Eastern end of SR 520 concurrency; western end of SR 27 concurrency
Georgia	Webster	Preston	44.562	71.716	SR 41 south (Washington Street) – Weston, Dawson	Western end of SR 41 concurrency
Georgia	Webster	Preston	44.631	71.827	SR 41 north (Cass Street) – Buena Vista, Ellaville	Eastern end of SR 41 concurrency
Georgia	Sumter	Plains	53.795	86.575	SR 45 south (Bond Street) to SR 308 – Dawson, Jimmy Carter National Historic Site	Northern terminus of SR 45
Georgia	Sumter		61.706	99.306	SR 49 south – Dawson	Western end of SR 49 concurrency
Georgia	Sumter		62.730	100.954	US 19 south / SR 3 south / Spring Street – Albany	Western end of US 19/SR 3 concurrency
Georgia	Sumter	Americus	63.583	102.327	US 19 north / SR 3 north / SR 30 west (South MLK Boulevard) – Ellaville, Buena Vista	Eastern end of US 19/SR 3 concurrency; western end of SR 30 concurrency
Georgia	Sumter	Americus	64.264	103.423	SR 377 south (Lee Street)	Northern terminus of SR 377
Georgia	Sumter	Americus	65.151	104.850	SR 49 north (Tripp Street / Crawford Street) – Oglethorpe, Andersonville, Andersonville National Historic Site, Airport, South Georgia Technical College, Georgia Southwestern State University	Eastern end of SR 49 concurrency
Georgia	Sumter	Americus	65.732	105.785	SR 27 east (Vienna Road) – Vienna	Eastern end of SR 27 concurrency
Georgia	Sumter	Leslie	76.653	123.361	SR 118 south / SR 195 south (Bailey Avenue) – Leesburg, Smithville, Georgia Rural Telephone Museum	Western end of SR 195 concurrency; northern terminus of SR 118
Georgia	Sumter	De Soto	78.209	125.865	SR 195 north – Andersonville	Eastern end of SR 195 concurrency
Georgia	Crisp		93.631	150.684	SR 300 Conn. south – Albany, Camilla	Northern terminus of SR 300 Conn.
Georgia	Crisp	Cordele	95.159	153.144	I-75 BL / US 41 / SR 7 / SR 90 north (7th Street) – Vienna, Ashburn, Historic Downtown Cordele	Western end of SR 90 concurrency
Georgia	Crisp	Cordele	97.027	156.150	I-75 (SR 401) to SR 300 – Macon, Valdosta, Albany	I-75 exit 101
Georgia	Crisp	Cordele	97.359	156.684	SR 90 south – Rebecca	Eastern end of SR 90 concurrency
Georgia	Wilcox	Pitts	109.773	176.663	SR 159 south (10th Street) – Rebecca, Ashburn	Northern terminus of SR 159
Georgia	Wilcox	Pitts	109.885	176.843	SR 215 north (8th Street) – Vienna	Western end of SR 215 concurrency
Georgia	Wilcox	Rochelle	114.895	184.906	SR 112 / SR 233 (Ashley Street) – Hawkinsville, Rebecca	
Georgia	Wilcox	Rochelle	114.990	185.058	SR 215 south (Gordon Street) – Fitzgerald	Eastern end of SR 215 concurrency
Georgia	Wilcox	Abbeville	124.373	200.159	US 129 / SR 11 (Broad Street) – Hawkinsville, Fitzgerald, Wilcox State Prison	
Georgia	Dodge		127.983	205.969	SR 87 north (Abbeville Highway) – Eastman, Hawkinsville	Southern terminus of SR 87
Georgia	Dodge	Rhine	130.870	210.615	SR 117 / SR 165 north (Central Street) – Eastman, Jacksonville	Western end of SR 165 concurrency
Georgia	Telfair	Milan	139.400	224.343	SR 165 south (Mt. Zion Street)	Eastern end of SR 165 concurrency
Georgia	Telfair	McRae-Helena	148.786	239.448	US 319 south / US 441 south / SR 31 south – Fitzgerald, Douglas	Western end of US 319/US 441/SR 31 concurrency
Georgia	Telfair	McRae-Helena	150.217	241.751	US 23 south / US 341 south / SR 27 south (Oak Street) – Hazlehurst	Southbound lanes of US 23/US 341/SR 27 on one-way pair
Georgia	Telfair	McRae-Helena	150.268	241.833	US 23 north / US 341 north / SR 27 north (MLK Jr Boulevard) – Eastman	Northbound lanes of US 23/US 341/SR 27 on one-way pair
Georgia	Wheeler		151.865	244.403	US 319 north / US 441 north / SR 31 north – Dublin, Little Ocmulgee State Park & Lodge	Eastern end of US 319/US 441/SR 31 concurrency
Georgia	Wheeler		157.718	253.823	SR 149 south – Scotland	Northern terminus of SR 149
Georgia	Wheeler	Alamo	159.731	257.062	SR 126 (Commerce Street) – Cadwell, Lumber City	
Georgia	Wheeler	Glenwood	166.554	268.043	SR 19 (2nd Street) – Dublin, Lumber City	
Georgia	Montgomery	Mount Vernon	171.490	275.986	US 221 / SR 56 (Railroad Avenue) to I-16 – Soperton, Uvalda	
Georgia	Montgomery	Ailey	173.269	278.849	Broad Street	Former SR 227 north
Georgia	Montgomery	Higgston	179.791	289.346	SR 15 north / SR 29 north / SR 135 south (James Street) to I-16 – Tarrytown, Soperton, Uvalda	Western end of SR 15/SR 29 concurrency; northern terminus of SR 135
Georgia	Toombs	Vidalia	182.808	294.201	SR 130 (Adams Street) – Uvalda	
Georgia	Toombs	Vidalia	183.087	294.650	SR 15 south / SR 29 south (Jackson Street) – Baxley	Eastern end of SR 15/SR 29 concurrency
Georgia	Toombs	Lyons	188.533	303.414	US 1 / SR 4 (South State Street) to I-16 – Swainsboro, Baxley	
Georgia	Toombs		197.291	317.509	SR 86 west – Oak Park	Eastern terminus of SR 86
Georgia	Tattnall	Reidsville	202.774	326.333	SR 56 west (Shepards Bridge Road) – Uvalda	Eastern terminus of SR 56
Georgia	Tattnall	Reidsville	203.666	327.769	SR 147 west (Tattnall Street) – State Prison	Eastern terminus of SR 147
Georgia	Tattnall	Reidsville	203.825	328.025	SR 23 / SR 57 / SR 121 (Main Street) to I-16 – Metter, Glennville	
Georgia	Evans	Bellville	213.683	343.889	SR 169 (Smith Street) to I-16 – Bellville, Jesup	
Georgia	Evans	Bellville	214.223	344.758	SR 292 west – Manassas	Eastern terminus of SR 292
Georgia	Evans	Claxton	217.339	349.773	SR 129 north (Ralph Street) – Metter	Western end of SR 129 concurrency
Georgia	Evans	Claxton	217.913	350.697	US 25 / US 301 (Duval Street / SR 73) – Statesboro, Glennville	
Georgia	Evans	Claxton	218.124	351.037	SR 129 south (River Street)	Eastern end of SR 129 concurrency
Georgia	Bryan	Pembroke	234.609	377.567	SR 67 north / SR 119 south (Main Street) to I-16	Western end of SR 67/SR 119 concurrency
Georgia	Bryan	Pembroke	234.663	377.653	SR 67 south / SR 119 north (College Street) to I-16 – Springfield	Eastern end of SR 67/SR 119 concurrency
Georgia	Bryan	Lanier	239.474	385.396	SR 204 east to I-95 – Ellabell	Western terminus of SR 204
Georgia	Bryan		245.445	395.005	I-16 (SR 404) – Macon, Savannah	I-16 exit 143
Georgia	Bryan	Blitchton	247.141	397.735	US 80 / SR 26 / SR 30 east – Statesboro, Savannah	Eastern terminus; eastern end of SR 30 concurrency
1.000 mi = 1.609 km; 1.000 km = 0.621 mi: Concurrency terminus; Incomplete access
