= Montgomery County, Georgia =

County in Georgia, United States

- County
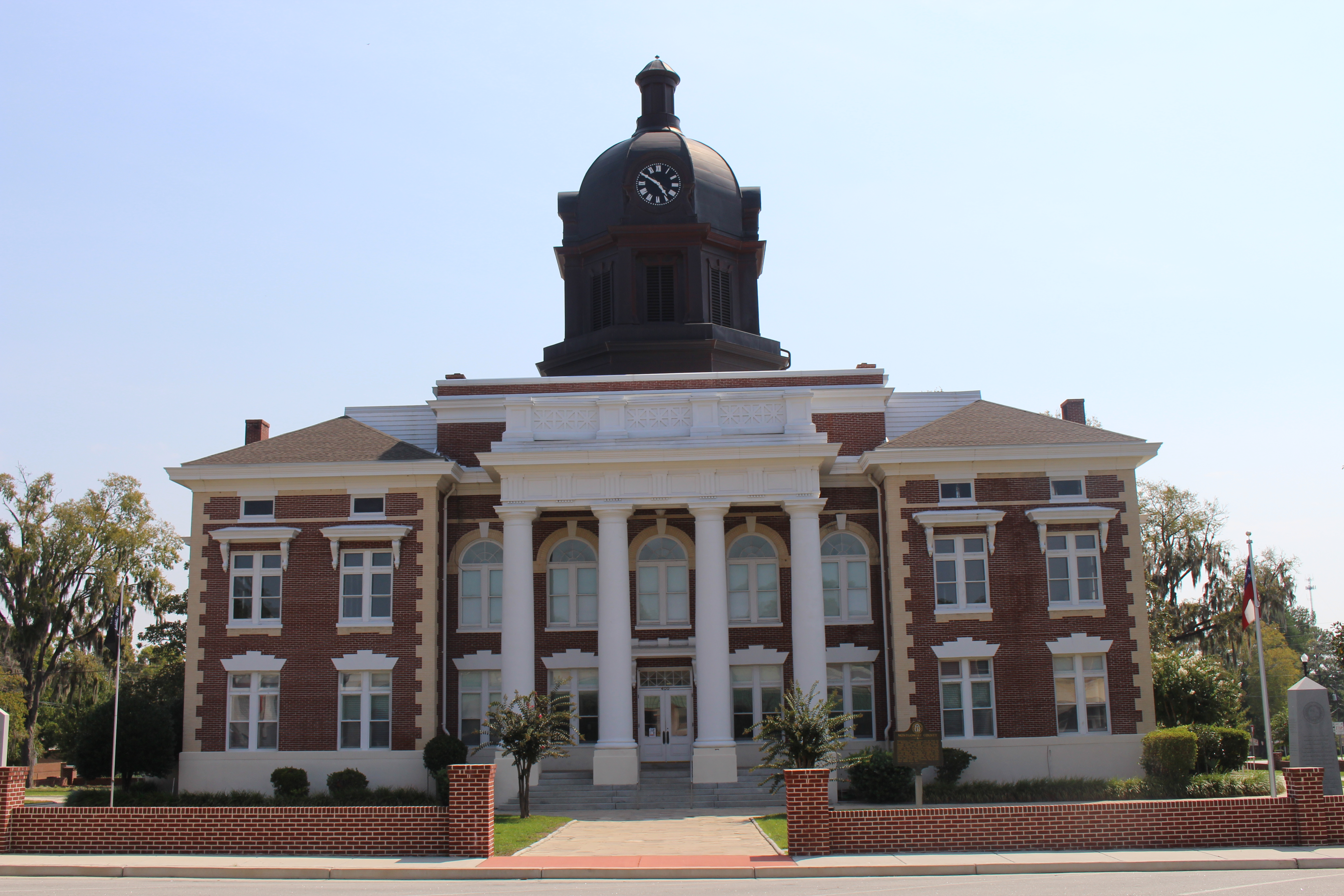
- Montgomery County Courthouse (built 1907) in Mount Vernon

- Logo

- Location within the U.S. state of Georgia
- Coordinates: 32°10′N 82°32′W
- Country: United States
- State: Georgia
- Founded: December 19, 1793; 232 years ago
- Named for: Richard Montgomery
- Seat: Mount Vernon
- Largest city: Mount Vernon

Area
  - Total: 245 sq mi (630 km^{2})
  - Land: 240 sq mi (620 km^{2})
  - Water: 5.2 sq mi (13 km^{2}) 2.1%

Population (2020)
  - Total: 8,610
  - Estimate (2025): 8,635 ▲
  - Density: 36/sq mi (14/km^{2})
- Time zone: UTC−5 (Eastern)
  - Summer (DST): UTC−4 (EDT)
- Congressional district: 12th
- Website: www.montcoga.gov

Montgomery County is a county located in the southern portion of the U.S. state of Georgia. As of the 2020 United States census, the population was 8,610. The county seat is Mount Vernon. Montgomery County is part of the Vidalia, GA micropolitan statistical area.

== History ==
Montgomery County is named in honor of Richard Montgomery, an American Revolutionary War general killed in 1775 while attempting to capture Quebec City, Canada. It was created on December 19, 1793, from a southern portion of Washington County, Georgia.

Arthur Lott's Plantation was designated the first county seat in 1797.

In 1801, Tattnall County, Georgia was formed from the southern part of Montgomery County. The dividing line between Tatnall and Montgomery ran from the mouth of Limestone Creek on the Oconee River, just below modern Mount Vernon, Georgia, to the mouth of Wolf Creek on the Canoochee River below Metter, Georgia.

=== The Great Revision ===
On December 11, 1811, the county lines between Washington County, Montgomery County, and Laurens County were adjusted by the Georgia General Assembly. The northern section of Montgomery between the Oconee River and the Ohoopee River was transferred to Laurens. On December 10, 1812, the county line of Montgomery was significantly adjusted as part of the creation of Emanuel County. Its new boundaries became from the then Laurens and Telfair county line on the Oconee River to the north prong of the Little Ocmulgee River (near present Chauncey, Dodge County, Georgia) down the Little Ocmulgee River as it meanders to its confluence with the Ocmulgee River then downstream as it meanders to the Oconee River, then North 30 degrees to Milligan's Creek in Tatnall County, and then with it to the Montgomery County line. Pendleton Creek (in modern Treutlen and Toombs counties) was used as the border between Montgomery and Emanuel. Because of these transitions Montgomery regained part of the land it had lost in the creation of Tatnall County in 1801 (land along the lower Oconee River), but also lost land along the upper Oconee River to Laurens County.

The creation of Emanuel County put the old county seat within Emanuel's border. On December 12, the Georgia General Assembly appointed the justices of the inferior court of Montgomery county to a commission to designate a new county seat and called for county business to be held until then at the home of James Alston. In 1813, the General Assembly recognized Mount Vernon as the new county seat.

The county line between Telfair County and Montgomery was adjusted once again in 1820 by the Georgia Genera Assembly. The new line differed in the upstream portion of the Little Ocmulgee River and better defined the line and gave Montgomery a small border with Pulaski County, Georgia and Telfair County some land on the northeast side of the Little Ocmulgee River. The line was to go upstream to its fork then to Browning's mill, a straight line to the mouth of Joiner's Creek (Near modern McRae, Georgia) at the second fork of the Little Ocmulgee River, and then up the second prong to Pulaski County Line.

The land gained by Telfair County from Montgomery County on the northeast side of the Little Ocmulgee River was reversed by the Georgia General Assembly on December 18, 1833.

=== American Civil War ===
At the time of the 1850 United States Census, Montgomery had 1,541 whites, 613 slaves. By the 1860 census, there were 2,014 whites, 977 slaves, and 6 Free people of color. The pine barrens and soil quality outside of the river lands made the area unsuitable for slave-heavy cotton producing plantation culture. Montgomery's status as a majority white county led the region developing different attitudes about secession from other areas of Georgia.

On January 22, 1861, Montgomery County representatives, Thomas M. McRae and Solon Homer Latimer, were among the 89 delegates who voted no to Georgia's immediate secession from the Union at the state secession convention. In addition, McRae and Latimer were among the 6 delegates who voiced their protest by against the Ordinance of Secession in the published document.

In the interior of the county around Gum Swamp (Modern Chauncey, Georgia) near the Pulaski County, Telfair County, and Montgomery County lines a deserter gang fought against Confederate forces.

=== Additional counties created ===
On August 18, 1905, Montgomery County gained and lost some territory during the creation of Toombs County. On August 14, 1912, the parts of Montgomery County between the Little Ocmulgee River and the Oconee River became Wheeler County. On August 21, 1917, Montgomery lost additional territory during the creation of Treutlen County, Georgia.

=== Modern ===
More recently, the county was noted for its practice of organizing segregated proms, a practice that had continued since integration of its schools in the 1970s. Following publicity about this practice, Montgomery County students took the initiative to integrate the prom in 2010.

== Geography ==
According to the U.S. Census Bureau, the county has a total area of 245 square miles (630 km^{2}), of which 240 square miles (620 km^{2}) is land and 5.2 square miles (13 km^{2}) (2.1%) is water.

The southeastern quarter of Montgomery County is located in the Altamaha River sub-basin of the larger river basin by the same name. The western half of the county, from Tarrytown south, is located in the Lower Oconee River sub-basin of the Altamaha River basin. The northeastern quarter of Montgomery County, northeast of a line from Tarrytown to Higgston, is located in the Ohoopee River sub-basin of the same Altamaha River basin.

=== Major highways ===
- U.S. Route 221
- U.S. Route 280 / State Route 30
- State Route 15 / State Route 29
- State Route 56
- State Route 130
- State Route 135
- State Route 199
- State Route 292
- State Route 298

=== Adjacent counties ===
- Treutlen County (north)
- Toombs County (east)
- Jeff Davis County (south)
- Wheeler County (west)

== Communities ==
=== Cities ===
- Ailey
- Mount Vernon (county seat)
- Uvalda

=== Towns ===
- Alston
- Higgston
- Tarrytown

=== Unincorporated community ===
- Charlotteville
- Kibbee

== Demographics ==
Historical population
Census	Pop.	Note	%±
1800	3,180		—
1810	2,954		−7.1%
1820	1,869		−36.7%
1830	1,269		−32.1%
1840	1,616		27.3%
1850	2,154		33.3%
1860	2,997		39.1%
1870	3,586		19.7%
1880	5,381		50.1%
1890	9,248		71.9%
1900	16,359		76.9%
1910	19,638		20.0%
1920	9,167		−53.3%
1930	10,020		9.3%
1940	9,668		−3.5%
1950	7,901		−18.3%
1960	6,284		−20.5%
1970	6,099		−2.9%
1980	7,011		15.0%
1990	7,163		2.2%
2000	8,270		15.5%
2010	9,123		10.3%
2020	8,610		−5.6%
2025 (est.)	8,635	▲	0.3%
U.S. Decennial Census; 1790-1880 1890-1910; 1920-1930 1930-1940; 1940-1950 1960-1980; 1980-2000 2010

=== Racial and ethnic composition ===
Montgomery County, Georgia – Racial and ethnic composition Note: the US Census treats Hispanic/Latino as an ethnic category. This table excludes Latinos from the racial categories and assigns them to a separate category. Hispanics/Latinos may be of any race.
Race / Ethnicity (NH = Non-Hispanic)	Pop 1980	Pop 1990	Pop 2000	Pop 2010	Pop 2020	% 1980	% 1990	% 2000	% 2010	% 2020
White alone (NH)	4,775	4,981	5,684	6,144	5,665	68.11%	69.54%	68.73%	67.35%	65.80%
Black or African American alone (NH)	2,122	2,023	2,251	2,372	2,120	30.27%	28.24%	27.22%	26.00%	24.62%
Native American or Alaska Native alone (NH)	4	4	6	6	11	0.06%	0.06%	0.07%	0.07%	0.13%
Asian alone (NH)	25	12	16	26	34	0.36%	0.17%	0.19%	0.28%	0.39%
Native Hawaiian or Pacific Islander alone (NH)	x	x	2	1	0	x	x	0.02%	0.01%	0.00%
Other race alone (NH)	0	1	3	4	13	0.00%	0.01%	0.04%	0.04%	0.15%
Mixed race or Multiracial (NH)	x	x	37	90	196	x	x	0.45%	0.99%	2.28%
Hispanic or Latino (any race)	85	142	271	480	571	1.21%	1.98%	3.28%	5.26%	6.63%
Total	7,011	7,163	8,270	9,123	8,610	100.00%	100.00%	100.00%	100.00%	100.00%

=== 2020 census ===
As of the 2020 census, the county had a population of 8,610, 3,157 households, and 2,102 families. The median age was 39.2 years, 21.1% of residents were under the age of 18 and 17.0% of residents were 65 years of age or older. For every 100 females there were 104.2 males, and for every 100 females age 18 and over there were 104.5 males age 18 and over. 1.3% of residents lived in urban areas, while 98.7% lived in rural areas.

The racial makeup of the county was 67.2% White, 24.8% Black or African American, 0.3% American Indian and Alaska Native, 0.5% Asian, 0.0% Native Hawaiian and Pacific Islander, 3.8% from some other race, and 3.5% from two or more races. Hispanic or Latino residents of any race comprised 6.6% of the population.

There were 3,157 households in the county, of which 31.9% had children under the age of 18 living with them and 28.4% had a female householder with no spouse or partner present. About 27.2% of all households were made up of individuals and 12.9% had someone living alone who was 65 years of age or older.

There were 3,740 housing units, of which 15.6% were vacant. Among occupied housing units, 72.4% were owner-occupied and 27.6% were renter-occupied. The homeowner vacancy rate was 1.3% and the rental vacancy rate was 11.9%.

== Politics ==
As of the 2020s, Montgomery County is a Republican stronghold, voting 76% for Donald Trump in 2024. For elections to the United States House of Representatives, Montgomery County is part of Georgia's 12th congressional district, currently represented by Rick Allen. For elections to the Georgia State Senate, Montgomery County is part of District 19. For elections to the Georgia House of Representatives, Montgomery County is part of District 156.

United States presidential election results for Montgomery County, Georgia
Year	Republican		Democratic		Third party(ies)	
Year	No.	%	No.	%	No.	%
1912	22	2.37%	854	92.03%	52	5.60%
1916	66	6.06%	1,002	92.01%	21	1.93%
1920	148	46.69%	169	53.31%	0	0.00%
1924	87	19.21%	353	77.92%	13	2.87%
1928	98	22.53%	337	77.47%	0	0.00%
1932	17	1.90%	868	97.20%	8	0.90%
1936	81	7.83%	945	91.39%	8	0.77%
1940	75	9.78%	686	89.44%	6	0.78%
1944	94	14.03%	575	85.82%	1	0.15%
1948	117	6.91%	1,048	61.90%	528	31.19%
1952	290	14.16%	1,758	85.84%	0	0.00%
1956	271	20.48%	1,052	79.52%	0	0.00%
1960	381	20.80%	1,451	79.20%	0	0.00%
1964	1,409	61.61%	878	38.39%	0	0.00%
1968	352	15.38%	503	21.98%	1,433	62.63%
1972	1,370	80.26%	337	19.74%	0	0.00%
1976	626	28.00%	1,610	72.00%	0	0.00%
1980	948	35.91%	1,663	62.99%	29	1.10%
1984	1,365	58.96%	950	41.04%	0	0.00%
1988	1,228	57.49%	903	42.28%	5	0.23%
1992	1,009	38.56%	1,185	45.28%	423	16.16%
1996	1,163	43.31%	1,233	45.92%	289	10.76%
2000	1,465	58.39%	1,013	40.37%	31	1.24%
2004	2,150	67.82%	1,007	31.77%	13	0.41%
2008	2,521	70.16%	1,045	29.08%	27	0.75%
2012	2,662	69.41%	1,135	29.60%	38	0.99%
2016	2,670	74.66%	847	23.69%	59	1.65%
2020	2,960	74.60%	980	24.70%	28	0.71%
2024	3,033	76.34%	927	23.33%	13	0.33%

United States Senate election results for Montgomery County, Georgia2
Year	Republican		Democratic		Third party(ies)	
Year	No.	%	No.	%	No.	%
2020	2,927	74.67%	931	23.75%	62	1.58%
2020	2,635	74.88%	884	25.12%	0	0.00%

United States Senate election results for Montgomery County, Georgia3
Year	Republican		Democratic		Third party(ies)	
Year	No.	%	No.	%	No.	%
2020	1,332	34.71%	582	15.16%	1,924	50.13%
2020	2,630	74.59%	896	25.41%	0	0.00%
2022	2,450	75.95%	742	23.00%	34	1.05%
2022	2,286	75.27%	751	24.73%	0	0.00%

Georgia Gubernatorial election results for Montgomery County
Year	Republican		Democratic		Third party(ies)	
Year	No.	%	No.	%	No.	%
2022	2,545	78.89%	670	20.77%	11	0.34%

== Education ==
Public education is provided by the Montgomery County School District.

== See also ==
- National Register of Historic Places listings in Montgomery County, Georgia
- List of counties in Georgia
