= Wally Moses =

American baseball player (1910–1990)

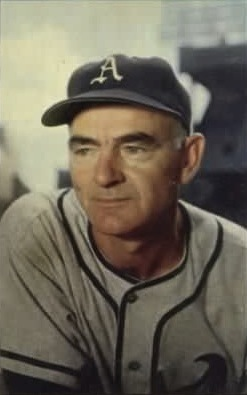
- Moses later in his career with Philadelphia.
- Right fielder
- Born: October 8, 1910; Uvalda, Georgia, U.S.
- Died: October 10, 1990 (aged 80); Vidalia, Georgia, U.S.
- Batted: Left Threw: Left

MLB debut
- April 17, 1935, for the Philadelphia Athletics

Last MLB appearance
- September 30, 1951, for the Philadelphia Athletics

MLB statistics
- Batting average: .291
- Hits: 2,138
- Home runs: 89
- Runs batted in: 679
- Stats at Baseball Reference

Teams
- Philadelphia Athletics (1935–1941); Chicago White Sox (1942–1946); Boston Red Sox (1946–1948); Philadelphia Athletics (1949–1951)

Career highlights and awards
- 2× All-Star (1937, 1945); 3× World Series champion (1961, 1962, 1968); Philadelphia Baseball Wall of Fame

Wallace Moses (October 8, 1910 – October 10, 1990) was an American professional baseball right fielder, who played Major League Baseball for the Philadelphia Athletics (1935–41; 1949–51), Chicago White Sox (1942–46) and Boston Red Sox (1946–48). Moses batted and threw left-handed, stood 5 feet 10 inches (1.78 m) tall and weighed 160 pounds (73 kg). He was born in Uvalda, Georgia and attended Vidalia High School. He is the only player in Major League Baseball history to accomplish a "walk off steal of home" more than once, which he did twice.

== Baseball career ==
Moses started his professional career with Galveston of the Texas League, where he batted .316 in 1934. He debuted with the Philadelphia Athletics on Opening Day of the 1935 season, singling off Earl Whitehill of the Washington Senators before President Franklin D. Roosevelt and Vice President John Nance Garner at Griffith Stadium. He batted over .300 in each of his seven years with the Athletics, including a career-best .345 in his sophomore year.

Moses had by far his most productive season in 1937, when he hit career-highs in home runs (25), RBI (86), runs (113), hits (208) and doubles (48), batting .320 with 13 triples. Prior to the 1940 season, he missed the opportunity to play for a World Series team, when his trade to the Detroit Tigers for Benny McCoy was nullified by Baseball Commissioner Kenesaw Mountain Landis. The commissioner's ruling made McCoy and 87 Tiger minor leaguers free agents.

Through years of last place finishes with Philadelphia, Moses had little chance to display his speed on the basepaths. But in 1943, with the Chicago White Sox, he posted a career-high 56 stolen bases and co-led the American League in triples (12). A strong-armed right fielder, he led the AL in putouts (329) in 1945.

He played in his only World Series in 1946 as a member of the Red Sox. Moses started three of the Series' seven games in right field, and batted .417 (5-for-12), tying a Series record with four hits in a game.

His first seven years with the A's, 1935 through 1941, were the most productive in his career. Moses surpassed .300 in every season. He produced 61 home runs, 354 RBI, and hit .317 (1,135-for-3,580). After being traded away after the 1941 season, he never hit .300 again and his productivity declined, recording 28 home runs, 325 RBI, and batting .266 (1,003-for-3,776) over the next ten seasons with the White Sox, Red Sox and a second term with the A's (1949-51). The closest he came to the .300 plateau is when he hit .295 with the White Sox in 1945.

In his 17-season career, Moses hit .291 with 89 home runs and 679 RBI in 2,012 games played. He added 1,124 runs, 2,138 hits, 435 doubles, 110 triples and 174 stolen bases. His career fielding percentage was .973. A patient hitter with a good eye, Moses collected a 1.80 walk-to-strikeout ratio (821-to-457). He also made the American League All-Star team in 1937 and 1945, but didn't appear in the 1937 game (there was no All-Star game in 1945 due to war restrictions).

== Post career ==
Immediately following his playing career, Moses became a coach for the Athletics from 1952 to 1954, the A's final three seasons in Philadelphia. He then moved to the Philadelphia Phillies (1955–58), Cincinnati Reds (1959–60), New York Yankees (1961–62; 1966) and Detroit Tigers (1967–70), serving as both a first base coach and hitting instructor. He also was a minor league batting coach and scout for the Yankees. As a hitting coach, he would teach his batters to go after pitches and lean over the plate.

Moses died in Vidalia, Georgia two days after his 80th birthday.

Moses was the last 20th century Athletics player with a 200-hit season, with 208 in 1937. Sixty-five years later, Miguel Tejada became the first Athletic since Moses to collect 200 hits when he achieved the mark in the 2002 season.

== See also ==
- List of Major League Baseball career hits leaders
- List of MLB all-time leaders in doubles
- List of Major League Baseball career doubles leaders
- List of athletes on Wheaties boxes
- List of Major League Baseball career triples leaders
- List of Major League Baseball career runs scored leaders
- List of Major League Baseball annual doubles leaders
- List of Major League Baseball annual triples leaders
- List of Major League Baseball career stolen bases leaders

Sporting positions
| Preceded by Ralph Houk; Vern Benson | New York Yankees first base coach 1961–1962; 1966 | Succeeded by Yogi Berra; Loren Babe |
| Preceded by Pat Mullin | Detroit Tigers first base coach 1967–1970 | Succeeded by Frank Skaff |
