= Alston, Georgia =

- Town
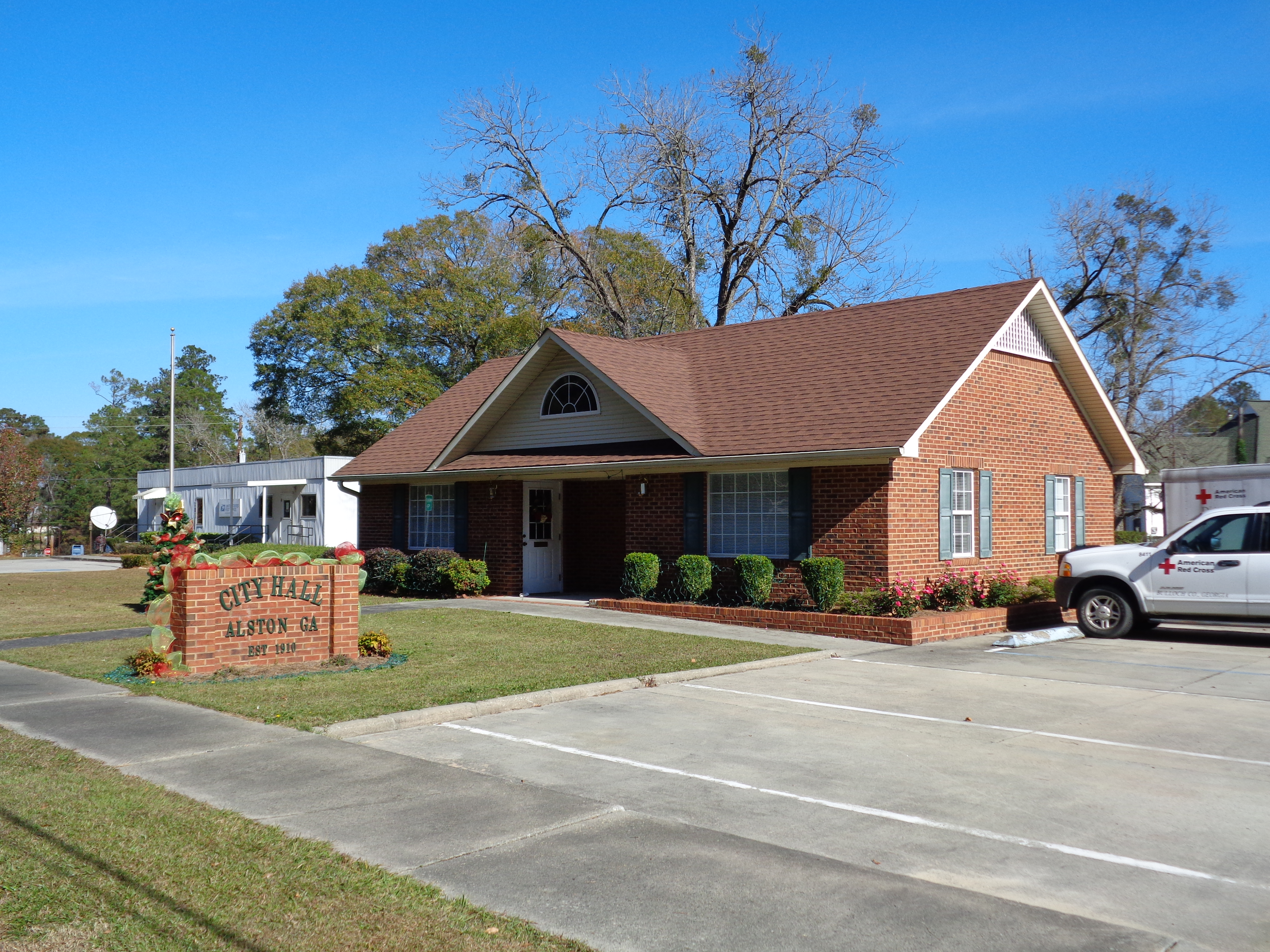
- Alston City Hall

- Location in Montgomery County and the state of Georgia
- Coordinates: 32°4′49″N 82°28′42″W
- Country: United States
- State: Georgia
- County: Montgomery

Area
  - Total: 2.87 sq mi (7.44 km^{2})
  - Land: 2.85 sq mi (7.38 km^{2})
  - Water: 0.027 sq mi (0.07 km^{2})
- Elevation: 230 ft (70 m)

Population (2020)
  - Total: 178
  - Density: 62.5/sq mi (24.12/km^{2})
- Time zone: UTC-5 (Eastern (EST))
  - Summer (DST): UTC-4 (EDT)
- ZIP code: 30412
- Area code: 912
- FIPS code: 13-01808
- GNIS feature ID: 0331031

Alston is a town in Montgomery County, Georgia, United States, with a population of 178 at the 2020 census.

== History ==
The community was named after Alex Alston, a pioneer citizen. A post office has been in operation at Alston since 1910. Alston incorporated in 1910.

Alston was the location of the murder of resident Isaiah Nixon, who was shot in his front yard in front of his wife and six children on September 8, 1948, after voting in the Georgia Democratic primary.

== Geography ==
Alston is located in southeastern Montgomery County at 32°04′49″N 82°28′42″W. Its eastern border is the Toombs County line.

Georgia State Route 135 runs through the town, leading north 10 miles (16 km) to Higgston and southwest 3.5 miles (5.6 km) to Uvalda. Mount Vernon, the Montgomery county seat, is 10 miles (16 km) to the northwest via Mount Vernon Alston Road.

According to the United States Census Bureau, Alston has a total area of 2.9 square miles (7.5 km^{2}), of which 0.03 square miles (0.08 km^{2}), or 0.87%, are water.

== Demographics ==
Historical population
| Census | Pop. | Note | %± |
|---|---|---|---|
| 1930 | 199 | | — |
| 1940 | 213 | | 7.0% |
| 1950 | 147 | | −31.0% |
| 1960 | 154 | | 4.8% |
| 1970 | 104 | | −32.5% |
| 1980 | 111 | | 6.7% |
| 1990 | 160 | | 44.1% |
| 2000 | 159 | | −0.6% |
| 2010 | 159 | | 0.0% |
| 2020 | 178 | | 11.9% |
U.S. Decennial Census; 1850-1870 1880; 1890-1910 1920-1930; 1930-1940 1940-1950; 1960-19801980-2000

As of the census of 2000, there were 159 people, 63 households, and 44 families residing in the town. By 2020, its population grew to 178.
