= Charlotteville, Georgia =

Unincorporated community in Georgia, U.S.

Coordinates: 32°00′41″N 82°31′20″W

Charlotteville is an unincorporated community in Montgomery County, in the U.S. state of Georgia.

== History ==
A post office called Charlotte was established in 1910, and remained in operation until 1933. The post office was named after Charlotte Mobley.
