= Kibbee, Georgia =

Unincorporated community in Georgia, U.S.

Coordinates: 32°17′16″N 82°31′30″W

Kibbee is an unincorporated community in Montgomery County, in the U.S. state of Georgia. The elevation of the town is 312 feet.

== History ==
A post office called Kibbee was established in 1886, and remained in operation until 1976. The community most likely was named after Charles C. Kibbee, a local judge.
