= Blitchton, Georgia =

Unincorporated community in Georgia, U.S.

Coordinates: 32°08′36″N 81°22′40″W

Locations in Georgia (U.S. state)

Blitchton is an unincorporated community in Bryan County, Georgia, United States. It is part of Savannah–Hinesville–Statesboro Combined Statistical Area. Blitchton is located about 25 miles west of Savannah, Georgia, and 2 miles northeast of Interstate 16. It is centrally located where U.S. Route 280 ends at an intersection with U.S. Route 80, Georgia State Route 26, and Georgia State Route 30.

== History ==
A post office called Blitchton was established in 1896, and remained in operation until 1955. In 1900, the community had 64 inhabitants.
