= Lanier, Georgia =

Unincorporated community in Georgia, U.S.

Coordinates: 32°07′48″N 81°32′12″W

Lanier is an unincorporated community in Bryan County, in the U.S. state of Georgia. It is located about 4 miles east of Pembroke, Georgia, where Georgia Route 204 ends at U.S. Route 280. There is a monument for J.O. Bacon at this intersection.

== History ==
A post office called Lanier was established in 1893, and remained in operation until it was discontinued in 1955. The community was named for Clement Lanier, an English classical musician.
