= Little Ocmulgee State Park =

State park in Helena, Georgia, United States

Little Ocmulgee State Park & Lodge
- IUCN category V (protected landscape/seascape)
- Interactive map of Little Ocmulgee State Park & Lodge
- Location: McRae-Helena, Georgia, U.S.
- Nearest city: McRae-Helena, Georgia
- Coordinates: 32.0926°N 82.8952°W
- Area: 1,360 acres (6 km^{2})
- Established: 1935
- Governing body: Georgia Department of Natural Resources (managed by Coral Hospitality)
- Website: littleocmulgeelodge.com

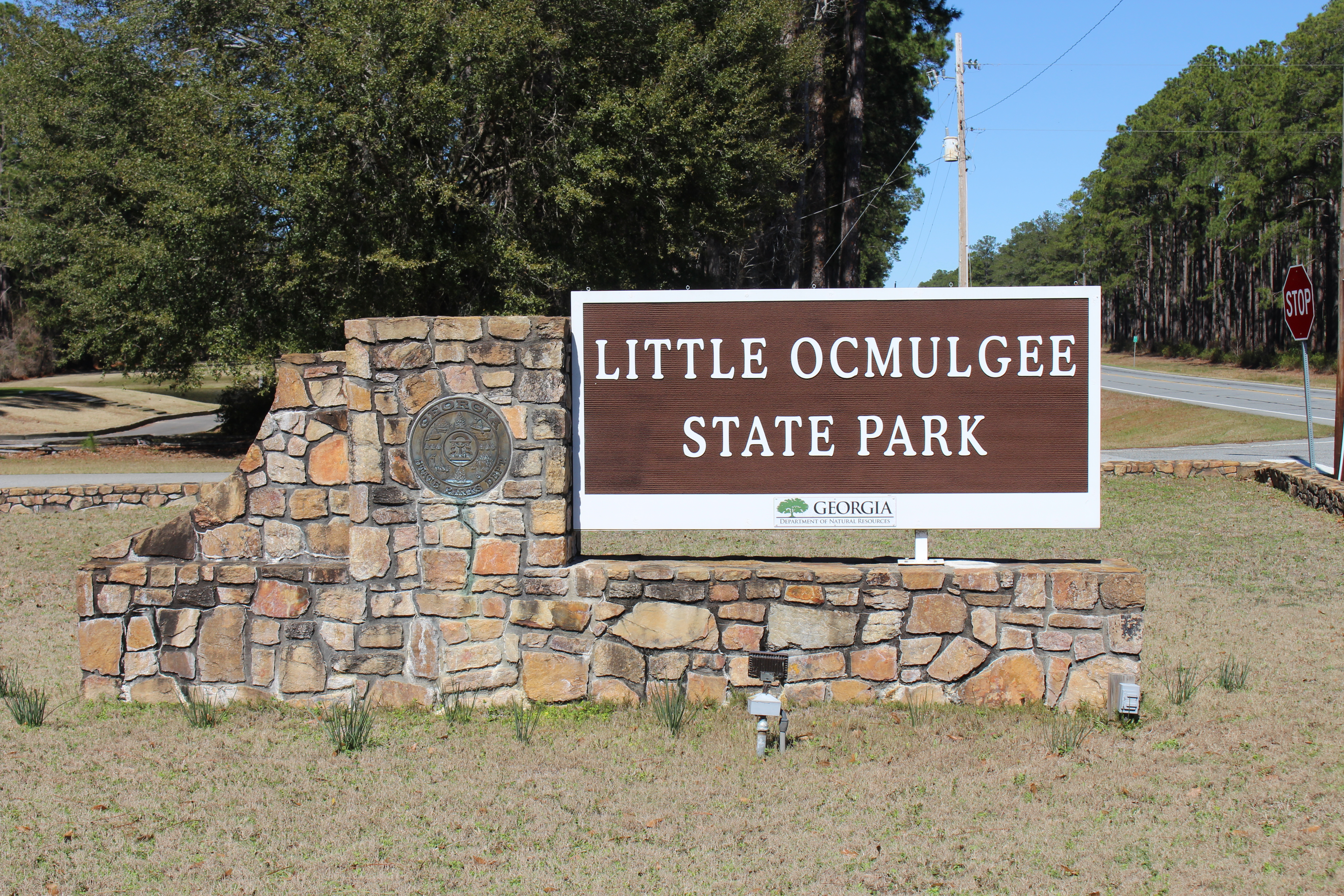
Road sign on US319 US441

Little Ocmulgee State Park & Lodge is a 1,360-acre (550 ha) Georgia state park located 2 miles (3.2 km) north of McRae-Helena on the Little Ocmulgee River. Part of the park was initially built by the Civilian Conservation Corps during the Great Depression, around the natural diversion of the Little Ocmulgee into a lake. This is a 256-acre (104 ha) lake with beach, and the park includes a 60 room lodge and a championship 18-hole golf course with pro shop, known as the Wallace Adams Memorial Golf Course. The soil around the Ocmulgee River and the Little Ocmulgee is a fine white sand, and therefore the lake has its own "beach sand". Also within the park is the 2.6-mile (4.2 km) long Oak Ridge Trail, allowing visitors to see native wildlife and plants.

== Facilities ==
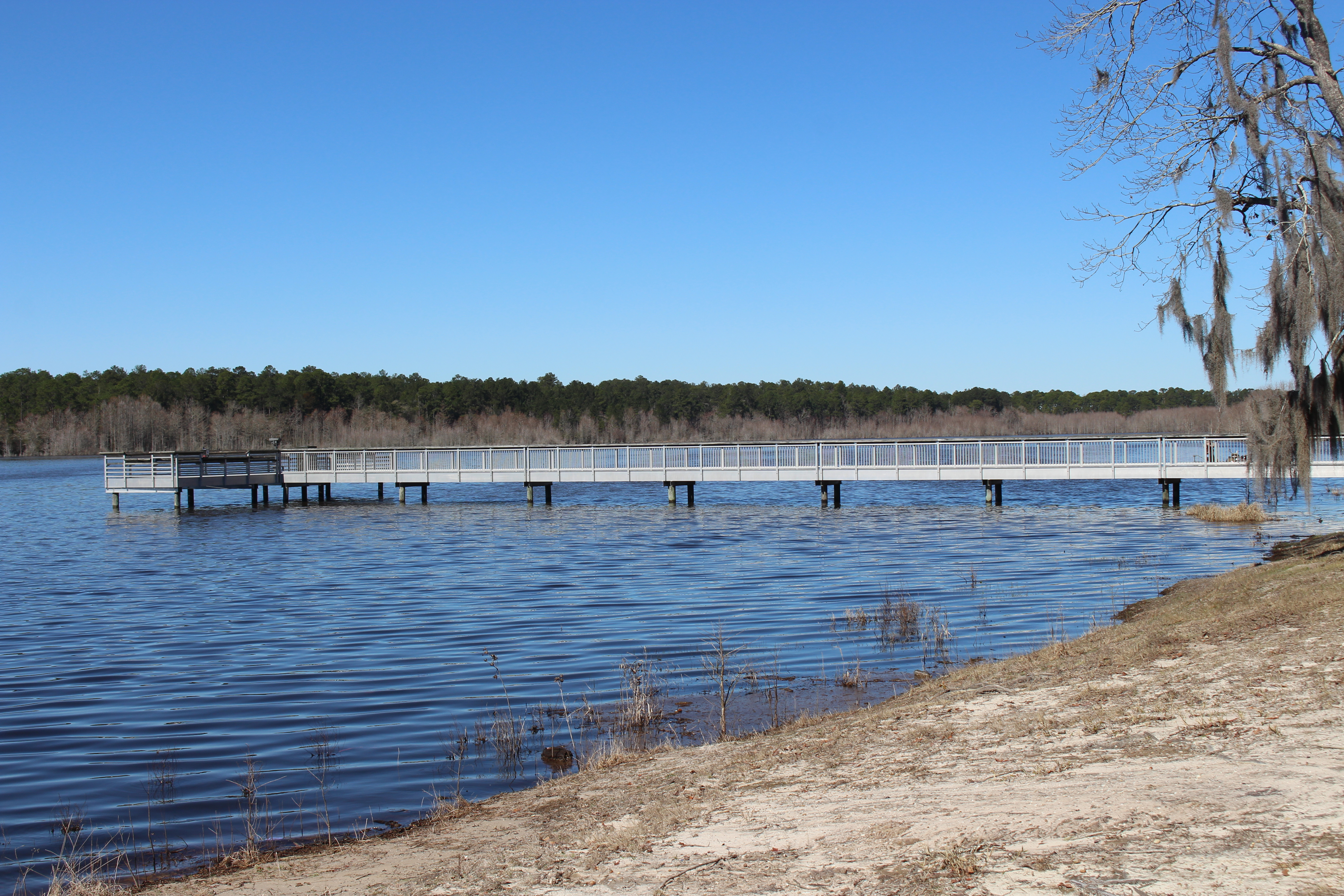
Fishing pier on Little Ocmulgee Lake

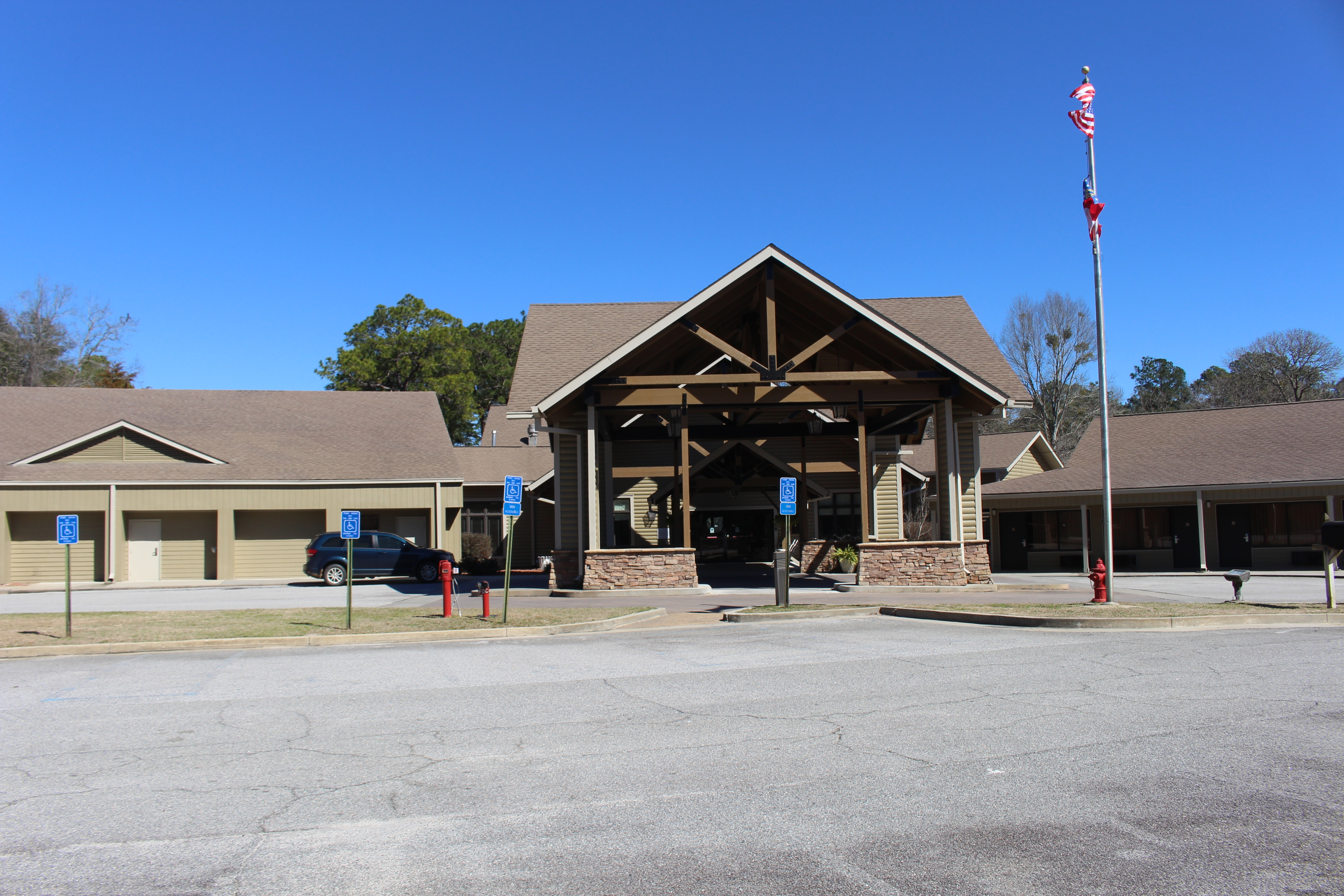
Little Ocmulgee State Park Lodge

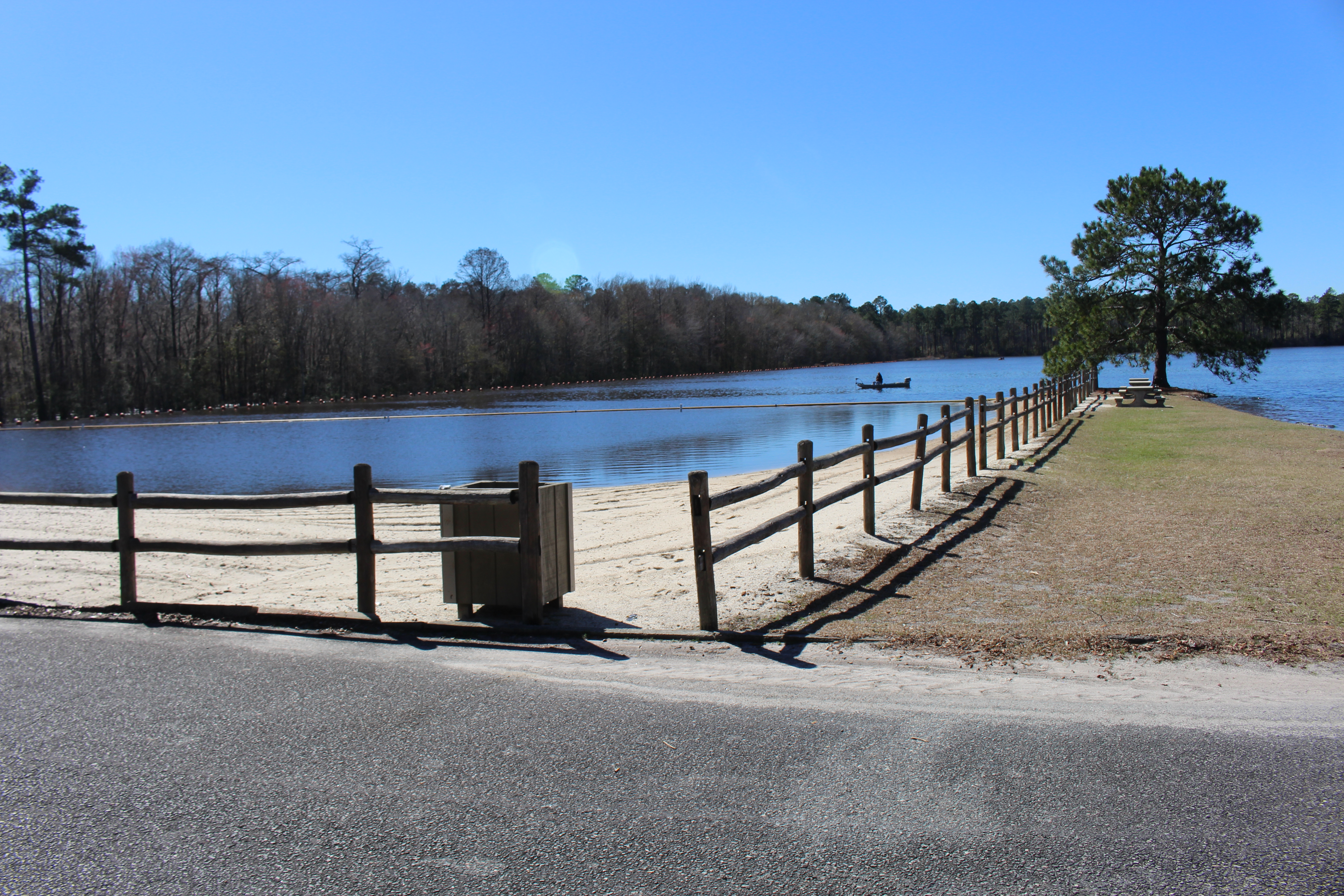
Thaxton Beach off of Little Ocmulgee Lake

- 60 lodge rooms
- 55 tent/trailer/RV sites
- 10 cottages
- 7 picnic shelters
- 1 group shelter
- Nature trail
- Group camp
- Pioneer camping
- 18 hole golf course and pro shop
- Amphitheater
- Restaurant
