= Tarrytown, Georgia =

- Town
- Location in Montgomery County and the state of Georgia
- Coordinates: 32°19′9″N 82°33′34″W
- Country: United States
- State: Georgia
- County: Montgomery

Government
  - Type: Mayor-council government
  - Mayor: Donna Adams
  - Councilmember: Elizabeth Atnip
  - Councilmember: Luke Atnip
  - Councilmember: Kelly Hyde
  - Councilmember: Linda Moore

Area
  - Total: 0.86 sq mi (2.24 km^{2})
  - Land: 0.86 sq mi (2.22 km^{2})
  - Water: 0.0077 sq mi (0.02 km^{2})
- Elevation: 305 ft (93 m)

Population (2020)
  - Total: 66
  - Density: 77.0/sq mi (29.72/km^{2})
- Time zone: UTC-5 (Eastern (EST))
  - Summer (DST): UTC-4 (EDT)
- ZIP code: 30470
- Area code: 912
- FIPS code: 13-75496
- GNIS feature ID: 0333191

Tarrytown is a town in Montgomery County, Georgia, United States. The population was 66 at the 2020 census, down from 87 in 2010.

== History ==
A post office was established at Tarrytown in 1902. The Georgia General Assembly incorporated Tarrytown as a town in 1912.

== Geography ==
Tarrytown is located in northern Montgomery County at 32°19'9" North, 82°33'34" West (32.319181, -82.559323). The Treutlen County line passes just north of the town limits.

Georgia State Routes 15 and 29 pass through the center of town together, leading northwest 4.5 miles (7.2 km) to Soperton and southeast 9 miles (14 km) to Higgston. Mount Vernon, the Montgomery county seat, is 10 miles (16 km) to the south via local roads.

According to the United States Census Bureau, Tarrytown has a total area of 0.9 square miles (2.3 km^{2}), of which 0.008 square miles (5.1 acres), or 0.92%, are water.

== Demographics ==
Historical population
Census	Pop.	Note	%±
1910	236		—
1920	273		15.7%
1930	295		8.1%
1940	298		1.0%
1950	250		−16.1%
1960	191		−23.6%
1970	188		−1.6%
1980	145		−22.9%
1990	130		−10.3%
2000	100		−23.1%
2010	87		−13.0%
2020	66		−24.1%
U.S. Decennial Census

As of the census of 2000, there were 100 people, 40 households, and 26 families residing in the town. By 2020, its population declined to 66.
