= Higgston, Georgia =

- Town
- Location in Montgomery County and the state of Georgia
- Coordinates: 32°13′2″N 82°28′2″W
- Country: United States
- State: Georgia
- County: Montgomery

Area
  - Total: 3.15 sq mi (8.17 km^{2})
  - Land: 3.15 sq mi (8.15 km^{2})
  - Water: 0.012 sq mi (0.03 km^{2})
- Elevation: 259 ft (79 m)

Population (2020)
  - Total: 314
  - Density: 99.8/sq mi (38.55/km^{2})
- Time zone: UTC-5 (Eastern (EST))
  - Summer (DST): UTC-4 (EDT)
- ZIP code: 30410 (Ailey)
- Area code: 912
- FIPS code: 13-38348
- GNIS feature ID: 0331970

Higgston is a town in Montgomery County, Georgia, United States. The population was 314 at the 2020 census.

== History ==
The Georgia General Assembly incorporated the place as the Town of Higgston in 1903. The community was named after James Higgs, proprietors of several local mills.

== Geography ==
Higgston is located in northeastern Montgomery County at 32°13′2″N 82°28′2″W (32.217330, -82.467332). U.S. Route 280 passes through the south side of town, leading west 8 miles (13 km) to Mount Vernon, the county seat, and east 3 miles (5 km) to Vidalia. State Routes 15 and 29 pass through the center of Higgston together as James Street and lead northwest 13 miles (21 km) to Soperton, while State Route 135 leads south from US 280 13 miles to Uvalda.

According to the United States Census Bureau, Higgston has a total area of 3.2 square miles (8.3 km^{2}), of which 0.01 square miles (0.03 km^{2}), or 0.32%, are water. Rocky Creek passes through the east side of town, flowing southeast to the Ohoopee River in Tattnall County.

== Demographics ==
Historical population
Census	Pop.	Note	%±
1910	207		—
1920	161		−22.2%
1930	150		−6.8%
1940	141		−6.0%
1950	155		9.9%
1960	151		−2.6%
1970	175		15.9%
1980	152		−13.1%
1990	274		80.3%
2000	316		15.3%
2010	323		2.2%
2020	314		−2.8%
U.S. Decennial Census

As of the census of 2000, there were 316 people, 134 households, and 84 families residing in the town. By 2020, its population was 314.

== Notable people ==
- J. Ollie Edmunds, fourth president of Stetson University
