= Wilcox State Prison =

Prison in Abbeville, Georgia, United States

Coordinates: 31°59′06″N 83°18′00″W

- Interactive map of Wilcox State Prison
- Location: 470 Broad Street South Abbeville, Georgia
- Status: open
- Security class: medium security
- Capacity: 1827
- Opened: 1994
- Managed by: Georgia Department of Corrections

Wilcox State Prison is a Georgia Department of Corrections state prison for men located in Abbeville, Wilcox County, Georgia.

The facility opened in 1994, and has a maximum capacity of 1827 medium-security prisoners.
