= Ailey, Georgia =

- City
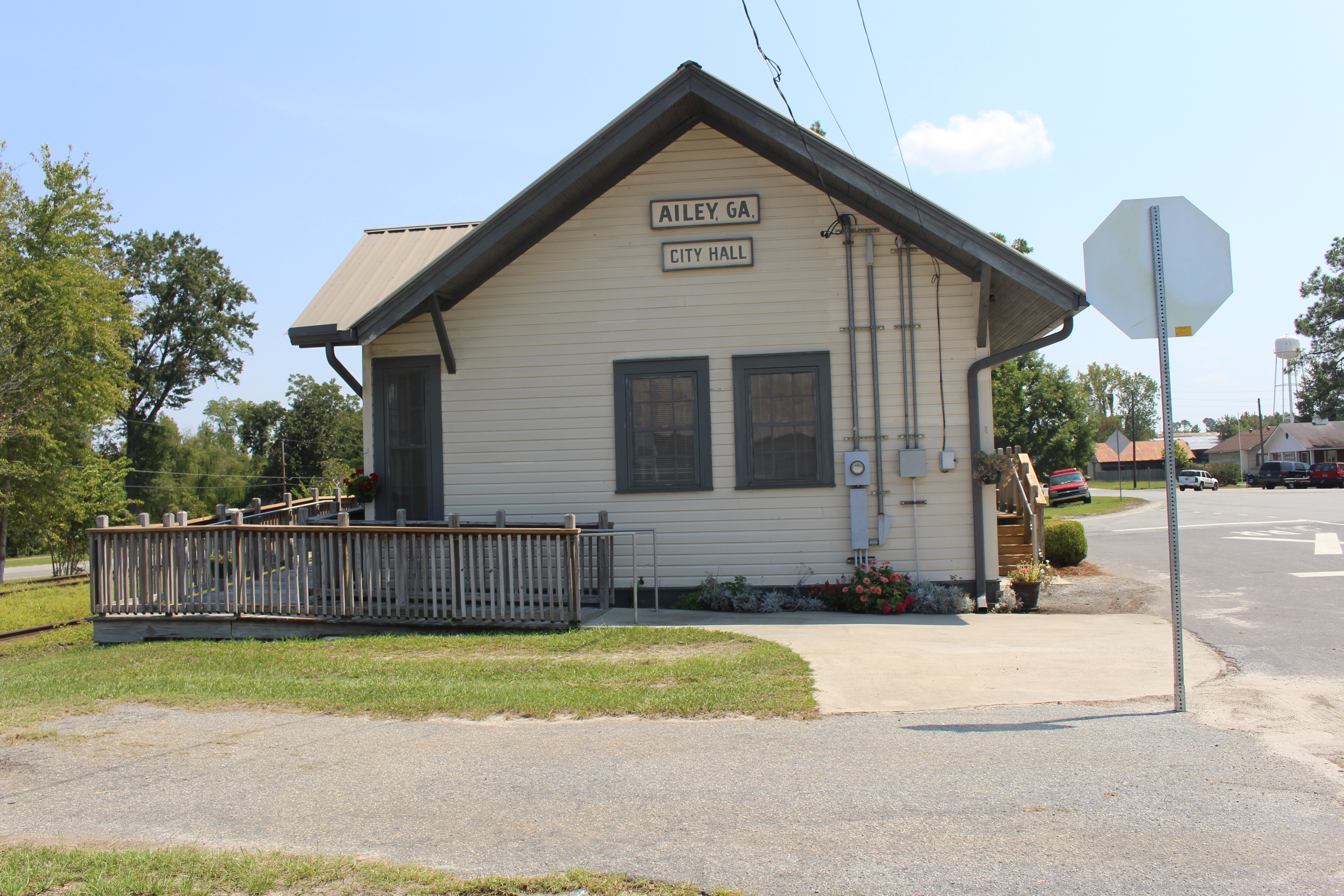
- Ailey City Hall

- Location in Montgomery County and the state of Georgia
- Coordinates: 32°11′14″N 82°34′8″W
- Country: United States
- State: Georgia
- County: Montgomery

Area
  - Total: 2.18 sq mi (5.64 km^{2})
  - Land: 2.16 sq mi (5.59 km^{2})
  - Water: 0.019 sq mi (0.05 km^{2})
- Elevation: 249 ft (76 m)

Population (2020)
  - Total: 519
  - Density: 240.4/sq mi (92.82/km^{2})
- Time zone: UTC−5 (Eastern (EST))
  - Summer (DST): UTC−4 (EDT)
- ZIP Code: 30410
- Area code: 912
- FIPS code: 13-00828
- GNIS feature ID: 0310413

Ailey is a city in Montgomery County, Georgia, United States. As of the 2020 census, the city had a population of 519, up from 432 in 2010.

== History ==
A post office called Ailey was established in 1891. The town incorporated in 1893.

== Geography ==
Ailey is located in western Montgomery County at 32°11′14″N 82°34′8″W (32.187181, -82.568932). It is bordered to the west by Mount Vernon, the county seat. U.S. Route 280 passes through Ailey, leading west through Mount Vernon 23 miles (37 km) to McRae–Helena and east 10 miles (16 km) to Vidalia.

According to the United States Census Bureau, the city of Ailey has a total area of 2.2 square miles (5.7 km^{2}), of which 0.02 square miles (0.05 km^{2}), or 0.92%, are water. The city is drained by tributaries of the Oconee River.

=== Climate ===
Climate data for Ailey, Georgia
Month	Jan	Feb	Mar	Apr	May	Jun	Jul	Aug	Sep	Oct	Nov	Dec	Year
Mean daily maximum °F (°C)	60.4 (15.8)	64.3 (17.9)	70.7 (21.5)	78.6 (25.9)	85.6 (29.8)	90.7 (32.6)	92.7 (33.7)	91.6 (33.1)	87.0 (30.6)	79.5 (26.4)	70.3 (21.3)	62.9 (17.2)	77.9 (25.5)
Mean daily minimum °F (°C)	37.1 (2.8)	38.9 (3.8)	44.3 (6.8)	52.4 (11.3)	60.3 (15.7)	66.5 (19.2)	69.8 (21.0)	69.3 (20.7)	64.5 (18.1)	54.2 (12.3)	44.4 (6.9)	38.6 (3.7)	53.4 (11.9)
Average precipitation inches (mm)	4.4 (110)	4.2 (110)	4.7 (120)	3.2 (81)	3.8 (97)	4.2 (110)	4.8 (120)	5.4 (140)	3.6 (91)	2.4 (61)	2.5 (64)	3.5 (89)	46.5 (1,180)
Source: Weatherbase

== Demographics ==
Historical population
Census	Pop.	Note	%±
1900	271		—
1910	306		12.9%
1920	385		25.8%
1930	428		11.2%
1940	506		18.2%
1950	508		0.4%
1960	469		−7.7%
1970	487		3.8%
1980	579		18.9%
1990	579		0.0%
2000	394		−32.0%
2010	432		9.6%
2020	519		20.1%
U.S. Decennial Census; 1850–1870 1880; 1890–1910 1920–1930; 1930–1940 1940–1950; 1960–1980 1980–2000

In 2020, the city had a resident population of 519.

== Notable people ==
- Hugh Peterson, lawyer
- Sugar Ray Robinson, boxer
