= Little Ocmulgee River =

Coordinates: 31.91935°N 82.64569°W

Location
- Country: United States

Physical characteristics
- Source
  - location: Georgia

The Little Ocmulgee River is a 28.3-mile-long (45.5 km) tributary of the Ocmulgee River in the U.S. state of Georgia.

== See also ==
- List of rivers of Georgia
