= Uvalda, Georgia =

- City
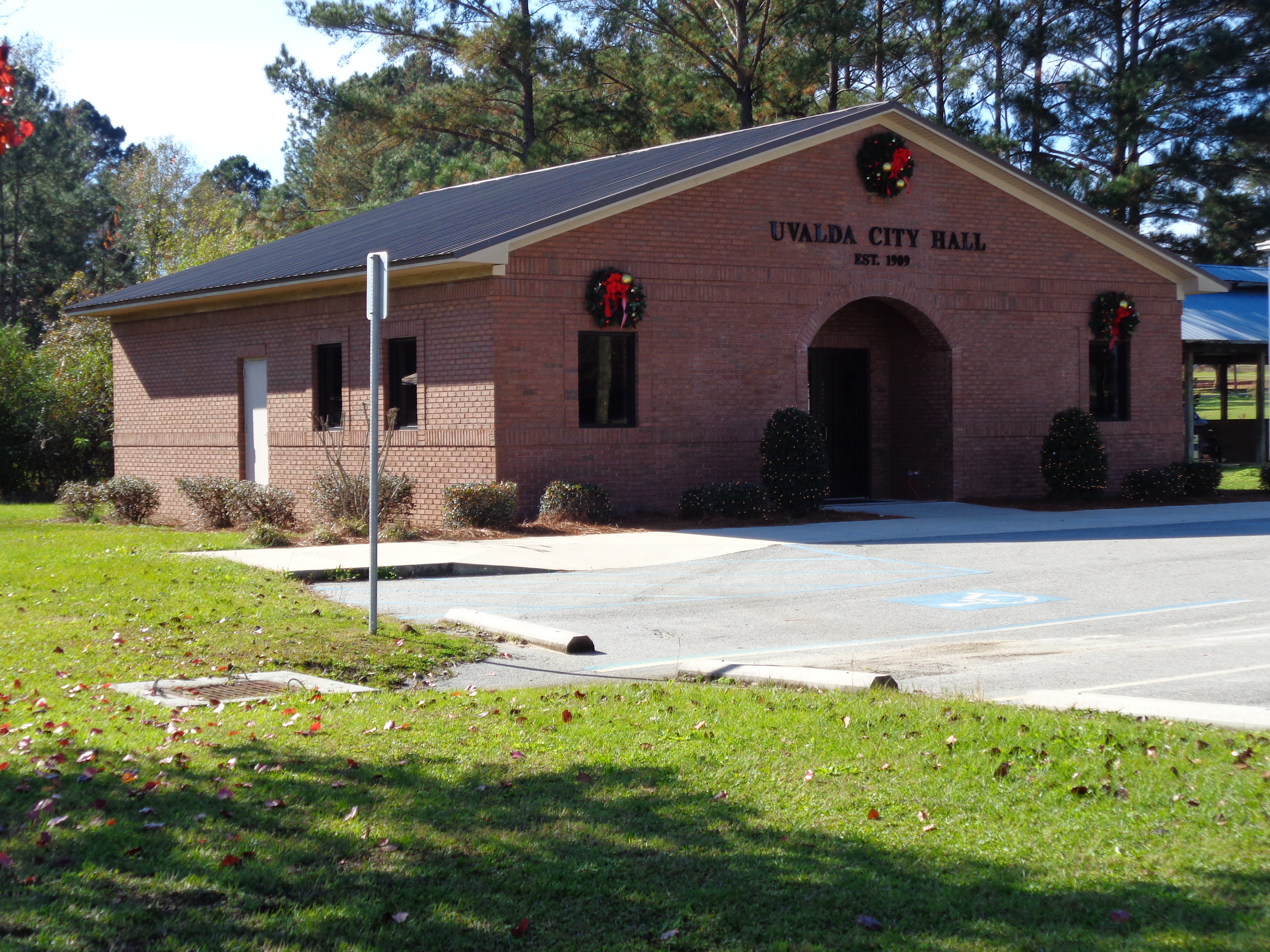
- Uvalda City Hall

- Location in Montgomery County and the state of Georgia
- Coordinates: 32°2′16″N 82°30′32″W
- Country: United States
- State: Georgia
- County: Montgomery

Government
  - Mayor: Elaine Manning

Area
  - Total: 1.91 sq mi (4.94 km^{2})
  - Land: 1.89 sq mi (4.90 km^{2})
  - Water: 0.012 sq mi (0.03 km^{2})
- Elevation: 177 ft (54 m)

Population (2020)
  - Total: 439
  - Density: 232.0/sq mi (89.56/km^{2})
- Time zone: UTC-5 (Eastern (EST))
  - Summer (DST): UTC-4 (EDT)
- ZIP code: 30473
- Area code: 912
- FIPS code: 13-78744
- GNIS feature ID: 0324646

Uvalda is a city in Montgomery County, Georgia, United States. The population was 439 at the 2020 census, down from 598 in 2010.

== History ==
The community derives its name from Juan de Ugalde, a Texas pioneer. The Georgia General Assembly incorporated Uvalda as a town in 1910.

== Geography ==
Uvalda is located in southern Montgomery County at 32°2′16″N 82°30′32″W (32.037903, -82.508789). U.S. Route 221 passes through the center of town, leading north-northwest 11 miles (18 km) to Mount Vernon, the county seat, and south-southwest 13 miles (21 km) to Hazlehurst. Georgia State Route 56 follows US 221 out of Uvalda to the northwest but also leads east 25 miles (40 km) to Reidsville. State Route 135 leads south to Hazlehurst with US 221 and north-northeast 13 miles (21 km) to Higgston.

According to the United States Census Bureau, Uvalda has a total area of 1.9 square miles (4.9 km^{2}), of which 0.01 square miles (0.03 km^{2}), or 0.68%, are water. Milligan Creek flows through the city just east of its center, leading southeast to the Altamaha River.

== Demographics ==
Historical population
Census	Pop.	Note	%±
1920	240		—
1930	513		113.8%
1940	592		15.4%
1950	511		−13.7%
1960	589		15.3%
1970	663		12.6%
1980	646		−2.6%
1990	561		−13.2%
2000	530		−5.5%
2010	598		12.8%
2020	439		−26.6%
U.S. Decennial Census

As of the census of 2000, there were 530 people, 201 households, and 147 families residing in the city. By 2020, its population declined to 439.

== Notable people ==
- Wally Moses, Major League Baseball outfielder
