= Vidalia, Georgia =

- City
- City of Vidalia
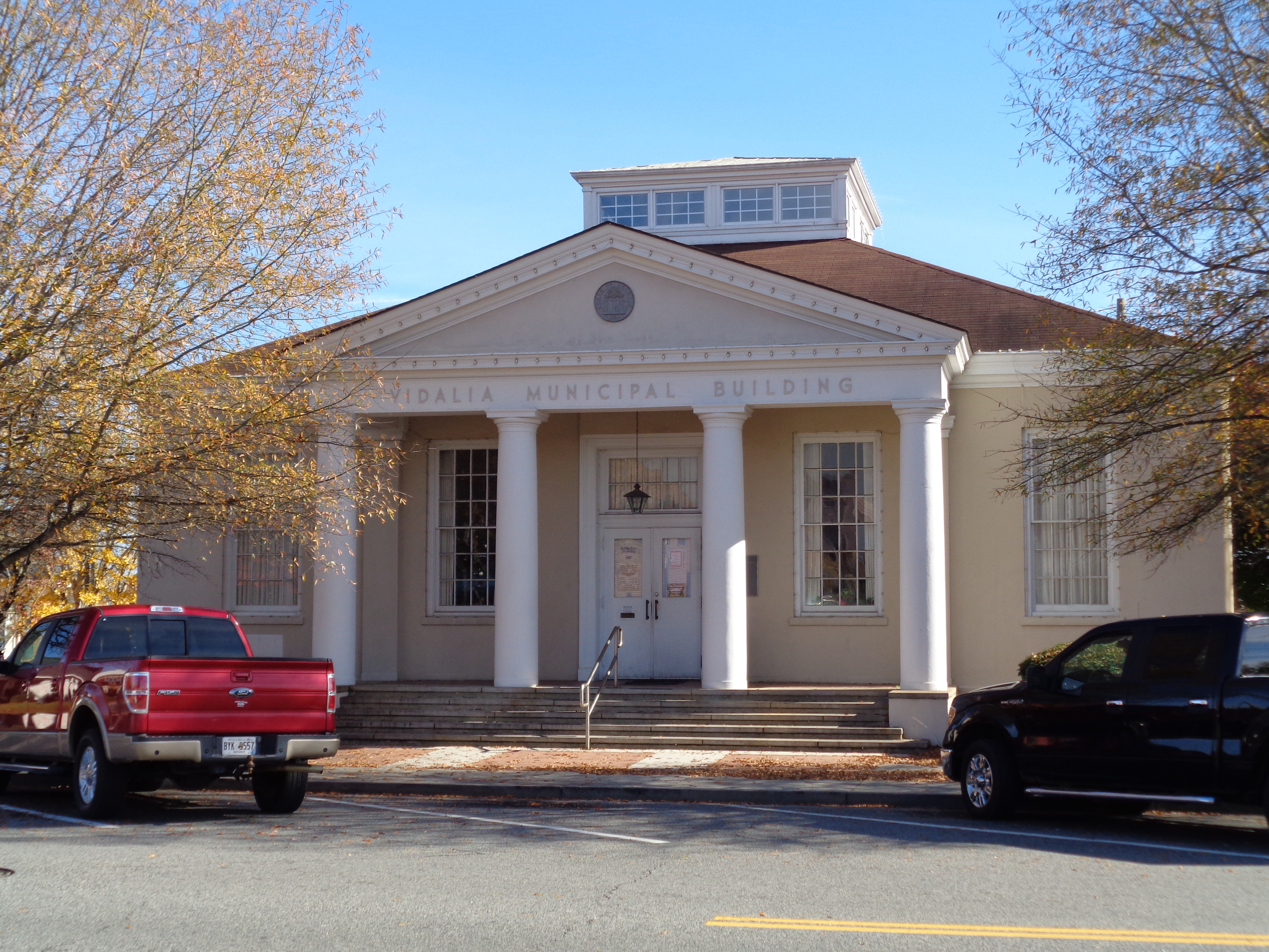
- Vidalia Municipal Building (2015)

- Flag Seal Logo
- Motto: "The Sweet Onion City"
- Location in Toombs County and the U.S. state of Georgia
- Coordinates: 32°12′55″N 82°24′36″W
- Country: United States
- State: Georgia
- Counties: Toombs, Montgomery

Area
  - City: 18.26 sq mi (47.29 km^{2})
  - Land: 17.89 sq mi (46.33 km^{2})
  - Water: 0.37 sq mi (0.96 km^{2})
- Elevation: 299 ft (91 m)

Population (2020)
  - City: 10,785
  - Density: 602.9/sq mi (232.77/km^{2})
  - Metro: 35,640
- Time zone: UTC-5 (Eastern (EST))
  - Summer (DST): UTC-4 (EDT)
- ZIP codes: 30474-30475
- Area code: 912
- FIPS code: 13-79388
- GNIS feature ID: 0324704
- Website: www.vidaliaga.com

Vidalia (/vaɪˈdeɪliə/ vye-DAYL-yə, locally /-ˈdeɪjə/ -DAY-yə) is a city located primarily in Toombs County, Georgia, United States. The city also extends very slightly into Montgomery County. As of the 2020 census, the city population was 10,785.

Vidalia is the principal city of the Vidalia Micropolitan Statistical Area, a micropolitan area that covers Montgomery and Toombs counties, and had a combined population of 35,640 at the 2020 census.

== Description and history ==
The town was incorporated on January 1, 1890. It is the largest city in Toombs County, but it is not the county seat. The original name for the town was "Jenkins Station", after a local landowner, Warren T. Jenkins. Although several origins for the town's modern name have been suggested, it was most likely given by a daughter of Samuel Hawkins, the president of the Savannah, Americus and Montgomery Railroad (later the S.A.M shortline), though which of his four daughters suggested the name, or how she came to it, is not known.

Like many towns in the region, Vidalia grew up around a rail yard that served farmers in the area who grew such crops as pecans and tobacco. The area's famous onions were not an important crop until much later.

From 1952 to 1956, Vidalia was home to the Vidalia Indians, a Class D minor league baseball affiliate of the Cleveland Indians. Vidalia played in the Georgia State League and won the 1953 League Championship.

In the 1950s, Piggly Wiggly grocery stores opened a distribution center in Vidalia, bringing with it a large influx of jobs as well as railroad business. At that time, Vidalia served as an interchange junction between the Seaboard Air Line Railroad and the Georgia and Florida. For this, a large seven-track yard was constructed, as well as a sizable engine servicing facility and interchange yard. The latter, smaller interchange yard is still in use to some degree by the Georgia Central Railway, while the larger yard was removed sometime in the 1970s. Dot Foods currently occupies most of the old Piggly Wiggly distribution center, with smaller companies leasing space.

== Geography ==
Vidalia is located in northwestern Toombs County at 32°12′55″N 82°24′36″W (32.215305, -82.410086). The westernmost part of the city is in northeastern Montgomery County.

The city is located along U.S. Route 280, which runs east–west through the center of town. U.S. 280 leads east 6 miles (10 km) to Lyons, the Toombs county seat, and southwest 12 miles (19 km) to Mount Vernon, the Montgomery county seat. Other highways that run through the city include Georgia State Routes 15, 130, 292, and 297.

According to the United States Census Bureau, Vidalia has a total area of 18.3 square miles (47 km^{2}), of which 17.9 square miles (46 km^{2}) are land and 0.4 square miles (1.0 km^{2}), or 2.03%, are water. The city is drained to the south by Rocky Creek and to the north by Swift Creek; both are part of the Ohoopee River watershed.

== Demographics ==
Historical population
Census	Pop.	Note	%±
1900	503		—
1910	1,776		253.1%
1920	2,860		61.0%
1930	3,585		25.3%
1940	4,109		14.6%
1950	5,819		41.6%
1960	7,569		30.1%
1970	9,507		25.6%
1980	10,393		9.3%
1990	11,078		6.6%
2000	10,491		−5.3%
2010	10,473		−0.2%
2020	10,785		3.0%
U.S. Decennial Census

=== 2020 census ===
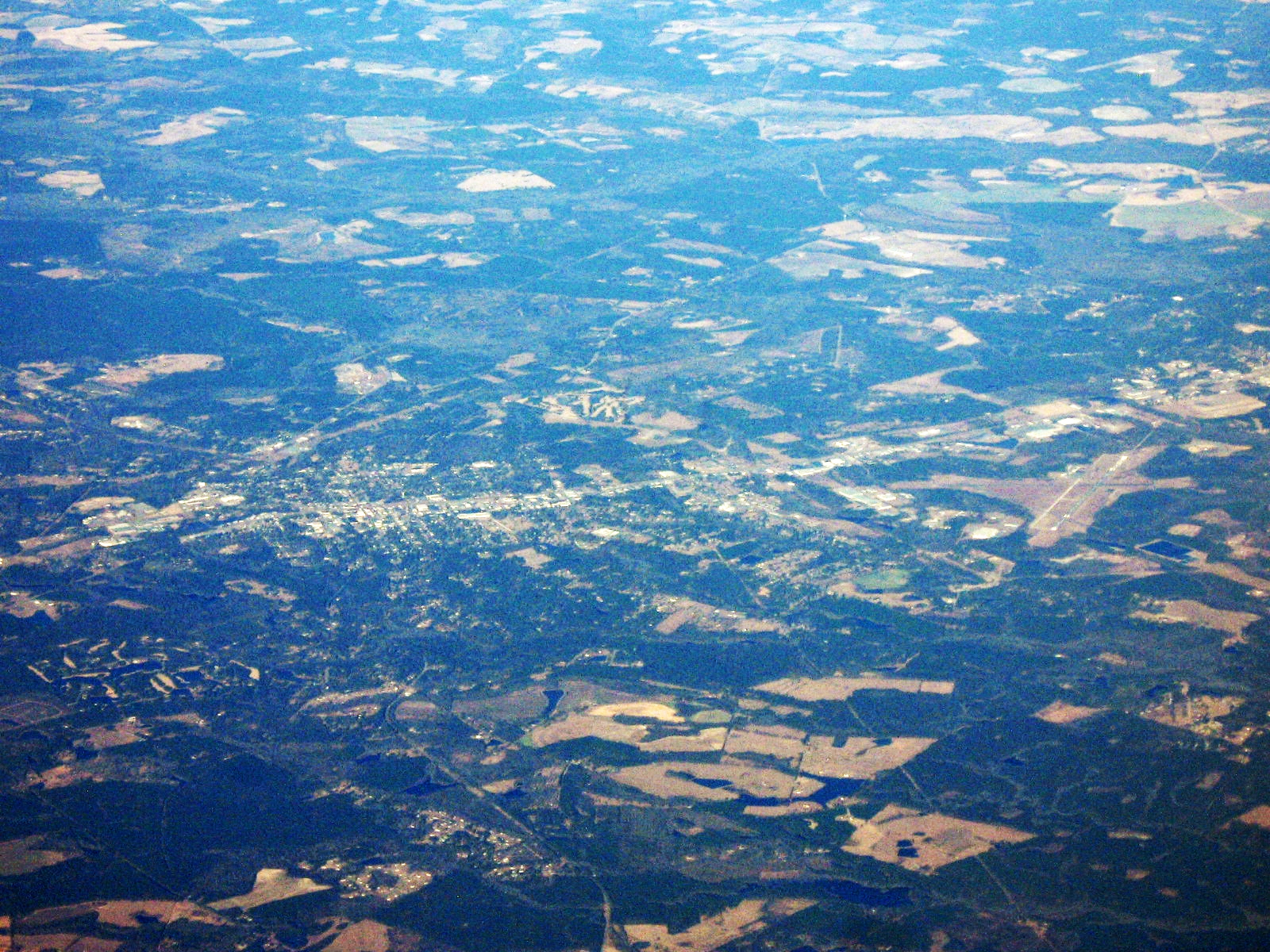
Vidalia (left) and Vidalia Regional Airport (right)

As of the 2020 census, there were 10,785 people, 4,285 households, and 2,499 families residing in the city.

The median age was 39.4 years. 25.3% of residents were under the age of 18 and 20.2% were 65 years of age or older. For every 100 females there were 83.0 males, and for every 100 females age 18 and over there were 76.5 males age 18 and over.

87.8% of residents lived in urban areas, while 12.2% lived in rural areas.

Of the city's households, 32.6% had children under the age of 18 living in them. Of all households, 36.8% were married-couple households, 16.1% were households with a male householder and no spouse or partner present, and 41.1% were households with a female householder and no spouse or partner present. About 30.4% of all households were made up of individuals, and 14.8% had someone living alone who was 65 years of age or older.

There were 4,824 housing units, of which 11.2% were vacant. The homeowner vacancy rate was 2.4% and the rental vacancy rate was 9.6%.

Vidalia racial composition as of 2020
Race	Num.	Perc.
White (non-Hispanic)	5,168	47.92%
Black or African American (non-Hispanic)	4,556	42.24%
Native American	16	0.15%
Asian	152	1.41%
Pacific Islander	2	0.02%
Other/Mixed	296	2.74%
Hispanic or Latino	595	5.52%

== Economy ==
Vidalia has a mixed economy, but its largest industry is agriculture. Since 1931, Granex onions grown in and near Vidalia have been licensed and sold internationally as Vidalia onions. In 1986, the Vidalia Onion Trademark Act granted a state trademark and protection on the onions of the Vidalia and Toombs County area. The 1989 Federal Marketing Order #955 of the USDA Agricultural Marketing Service gave the growers and handlers the legal rights to establish the Vidalia Onion Committee, and it granted U.S. federal protection of the onion's name and production.

=== Onions ===
Vidalia is best known for its "sweet" onions. The Vidalia onion was first produced about 1931 when a farmer named Mose Coleman discovered that the onions he produced were sweeter than other onions. Other farmers started growing the same crop, and in the 1940s the Vidalia onion became an item sold to tourists.

Vidalia onion growers have protected their brand, and today all onions labelled "Vidalia" must be grown in one of thirteen counties in Georgia or in specific portions of seven other counties. Because of their taste and reputation, they are able to command an increased price in the marketplace.

In 1990, the Vidalia onion was named as the official vegetable of the state of Georgia.

== Arts and culture ==
=== Annual cultural events ===
Each spring Vidalia holds a Vidalia Onion Festival. The event lasts for five days and draws in many tourists with its wide variety of activities.

=== Museums and other points of interest ===
The Altama Gallery is a museum of history and art located inside the restored Brazell House.

The Vidalia Onion Museum (located at 100 Vidalia Sweet Onion Drive) provides guests with an interactive, historical experience. The 1,300-square-foot (120 m^{2}) space is filled with an array of educational exhibits that highlight the sweet onion's economic, cultural, and culinary significance.

== Education ==
=== Public schools ===
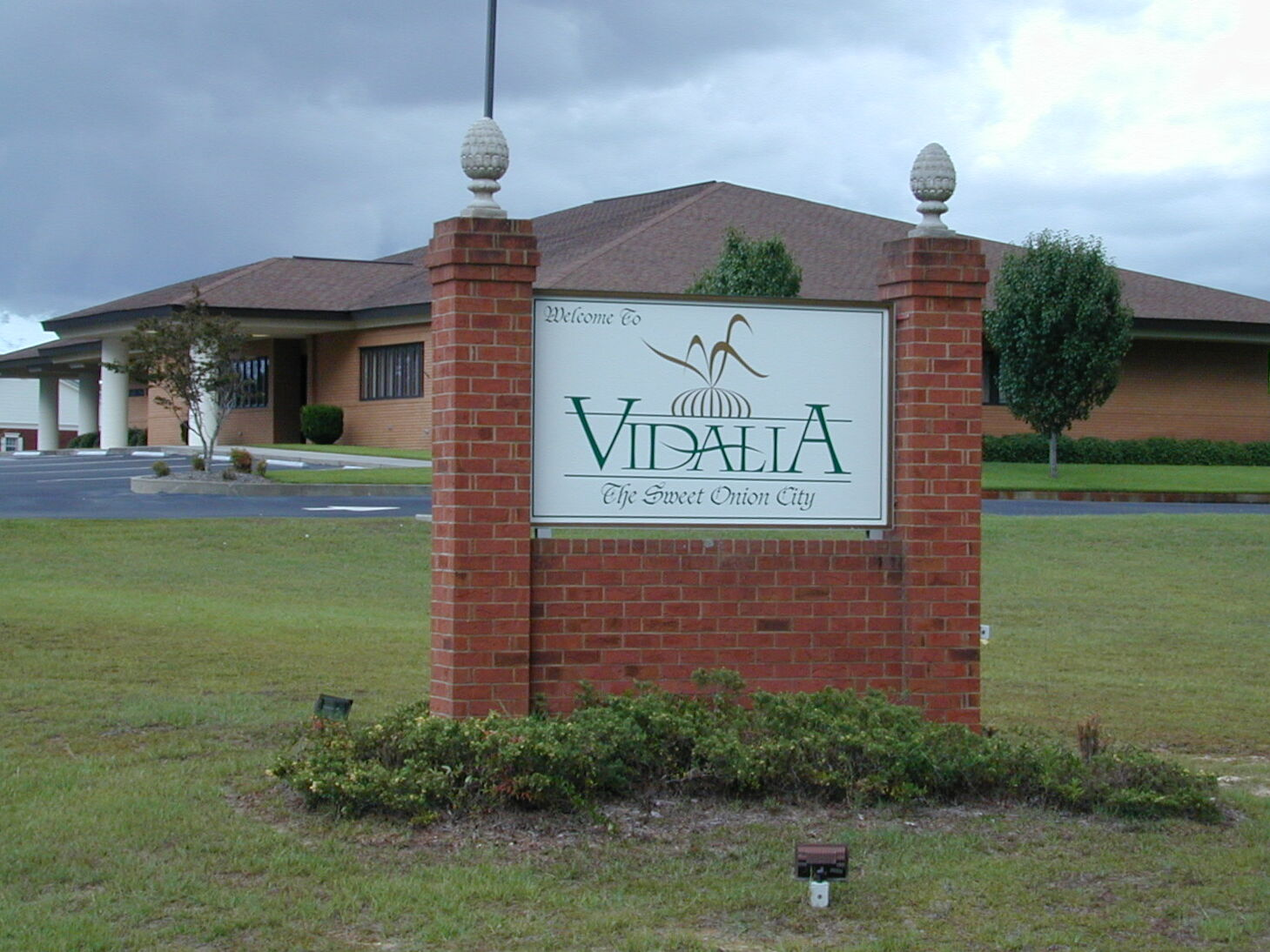
Vidalia welcome sign

Vidalia Public Schools are part of the Vidalia City School District. The school district holds preschool to grade twelve, and consists of two elementary schools, a middle school, and a high school. The district has 144 full-time teachers and over 2,408 students.

- J.D. Dickerson Primary School
- Sally Dailey Meadows Elementary School
- J.R. Trippe Middle School
- Vidalia Comprehensive High School
- Edward D Phillips Special Education Center.

=== Private ===
- The Paul Anderson Youth Home offers faith-based accredited preparatory education and substance abuse treatment to at-risk youth.
- Vidalia Heritage Academy provides development of character and academic excellence from a Christian perspective in a Christian environment for Preschool, Elementary School, and Middle/High School youth.

== Notable people ==
- Paul Anderson, Olympic weightlifter and strongman; founder of the Paul Anderson Youth Home in Vidalia
- Mel Blount, former Pittsburgh Steelers defensive back, five-time Pro Bowler and Pro Football Hall of Fame inductee; born in Vidalia
- Paul Claxton, professional golfer; born in Vidalia
- Don Harris, NBC News correspondent killed during the Jonestown Massacre; born in Vidalia
- Carl Simpson, football player; born in Vidalia
- Fred Stokes, defensive end who played ten seasons in the National Football League; born in Vidalia
