= Mount Vernon, Georgia =

- City
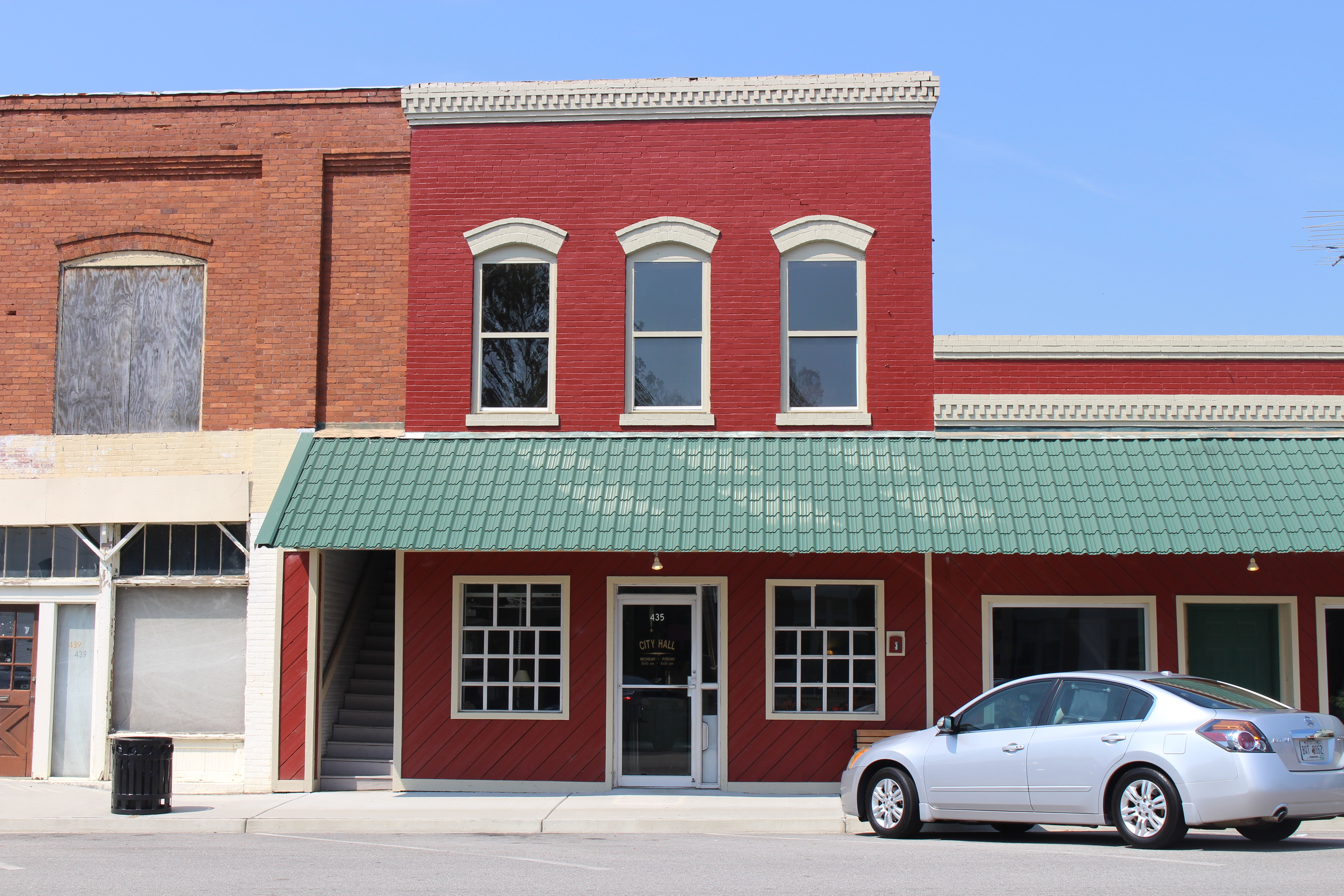
- City Hall in Mount Vernon

- Location in Montgomery County and the state of Georgia
- Coordinates: 32°10′53″N 82°35′38″W
- Country: United States
- State: Georgia
- County: Montgomery

Area
  - Total: 4.23 sq mi (10.95 km^{2})
  - Land: 4.20 sq mi (10.87 km^{2})
  - Water: 0.031 sq mi (0.08 km^{2})
- Elevation: 226 ft (69 m)

Population (2020)
  - Total: 1,990
  - Density: 474.0/sq mi (183.03/km^{2})
- Time zone: UTC-5 (Eastern (EST))
  - Summer (DST): UTC-4 (EDT)
- ZIP code: 30445
- Area code: 912
- FIPS code: 13-53508
- GNIS feature ID: 0318897
- Website: mtvernonga.org

Mount Vernon is a city in and the county seat of Montgomery County, Georgia, United States. The population was 1,900 at the 2020 census, down from 2,451 in 2010. It is home to Brewton–Parker College.

== History ==
Mount Vernon was founded in 1797. It became the county seat in 1813, replacing the plantation of Arthur Lott. It was incorporated as a town in 1872 and as a city in 1960. The city is named after Mount Vernon, the estate of George Washington.

== Geography ==
Mount Vernon is located on the west side of Montgomery County at 32°10′53″N 82°35′38″W (32.181403, -82.593759). It sits on high ground 1 mile (1.6 km) east of the Oconee River, which forms the Wheeler County line. It is bordered to the east by Ailey.

U.S. Routes 221 and 280 intersect just north of the center of town. US 221 leads north 14 miles (23 km) to Soperton and south 25 miles (40 km) to Hazlehurst, while US 280 leads east 11 miles (18 km) to Vidalia and west 21 miles (34 km) to McRae–Helena.

According to the United States Census Bureau, Mount Vernon has a total area of 4.2 square miles (11 km^{2}), of which 0.03 square miles (0.08 km^{2}), or 0.76%, are water.

== Demographics ==
Historical population
Census	Pop.	Note	%±
1880	69		—
1890	707		924.6%
1900	573		−19.0%
1910	605		5.6%
1920	722		19.3%
1930	779		7.9%
1940	900		15.5%
1950	990		10.0%
1960	1,166		17.8%
1970	1,579		35.4%
1980	1,737		10.0%
1990	1,914		10.2%
2000	2,082		8.8%
2010	2,451		17.7%
2020	1,990		−18.8%
U.S. Decennial Census

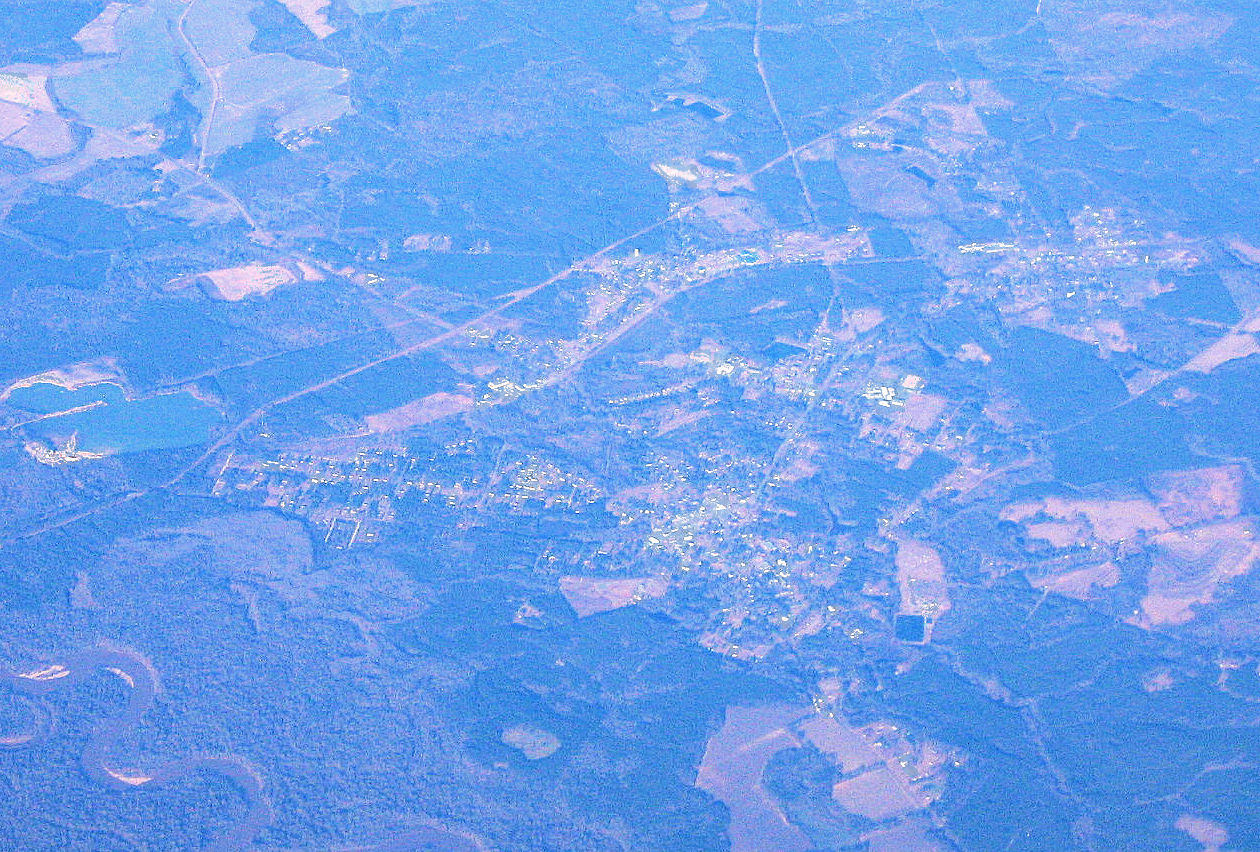
Aerial view of Mount Vernon

=== 2020 census ===
Mount Vernon racial composition as of 2020
Race	Num.	Perc.
White (non-Hispanic)	790	39.7%
Black or African American (non-Hispanic)	977	49.1%
Native American	4	0.2%
Asian	15	0.75%
Other/Mixed	48	2.41%
Hispanic or Latino	156	7.84%

As of the 2020 census, Mount Vernon had a population of 1,990. The median age was 33.7 years. 23.3% of residents were under the age of 18 and 14.2% of residents were 65 years of age or older. For every 100 females there were 107.9 males, and for every 100 females age 18 and over there were 105.5 males age 18 and over.

0.0% of residents lived in urban areas, while 100.0% lived in rural areas.

There were 743 households in Mount Vernon, including 554 families, of which 31.4% had children under the age of 18 living in them. Of all households, 31.1% were married-couple households, 21.3% were households with a male householder and no spouse or partner present, and 39.8% were households with a female householder and no spouse or partner present. About 33.5% of all households were made up of individuals and 13.8% had someone living alone who was 65 years of age or older.

There were 880 housing units, of which 15.6% were vacant. The homeowner vacancy rate was 1.7% and the rental vacancy rate was 12.5%.

== Education ==
=== College ===
Brewton–Parker College is a private, Christian, coeducational college whose main campus is located in Mount Vernon.

=== Primary and secondary education ===
The Montgomery County School District holds grades pre-school to grade twelve, and consists of one elementary school, a middle school, and a high school. The district has 83 full-time teachers and over 1,294 students.

- Montgomery County High School
- Montgomery County Middle School
- Montgomery County Elementary School

Montgomery County High School didn't have an integrated prom until 2010. The school received national attention in the New York Times for unofficially sponsoring separate, segregated proms for white and black students. It is one of 178 school districts in the United States with an open, active desegregation order.

== Media ==
- WYUM, 101.7 FM Radio

== Infrastructure ==
=== Transportation ===
Highways

- US 221
- US 280
- SR 30
- SR 56

== Notable people ==
- John Britton, third baseman in the Negro leagues and the Japanese Pacific League
- Theodore Johnson, member of the Pennsylvania House of Representatives
