= Georgia State Route 96 =

State highway in Georgia, United States

State Route 96
- SR 96 highlighted in red

Route information
- Maintained by GDOT
- Length: 94.9 mi (152.7 km)

Major junctions
- West end: US 80 / SR 22 / SR 41 / SR 540 in Geneva
- US 19 / SR 3 in Butler; US 341 / SR 7 / SR 49 / SR 540 in Fort Valley; I-75 in Fort Valley; US 41 / SR 11 in Warner Robins; US 129 / SR 247 in Bonaire; US 23 / US 129 Alt. / SR 87 in Tarversville; I-16 near Jeffersonville; US 80 / SR 18 / SR 19 in Jeffersonville
- East end: US 441 / SR 29 near Irwinton

Location
- Country: United States
- State: Georgia
- Counties: Talbot, Taylor, Crawford, Peach, Houston, Twiggs, Wilkinson

Highway system
- Georgia State Highway System; Interstate; US; State; Special
← SR 95	→ SR 97

State Route 96 (SR 96) is a 94.9-mile-long (152.7 km) state highway that travels west-to-east through portions of Talbot, Taylor, Crawford, Peach, Houston, Twiggs, and Wilkinson counties in the west-central and central parts of the U.S. state of Georgia. The highway travels from its western terminus at US 80/SR 22/SR 41/SR 540 in Geneva to its eastern terminus at US 441/SR 29 south-southeast of Irwinton.

The portion from Geneva to a point west of Fort Valley is part of the Fall Line Freeway, a long-distance route for commercial vehicles that travels from Columbus to Augusta.

== Route description ==
=== Talbot County ===
SR 96 begins at an intersection with US 80/SR 22/SR 41/SR 540 (Geneva Highway / Fall Line Freeway) in the central part of Geneva, which is located in the south-central portion of Talbot County. At this intersection, SR 96 begins a concurrency with SR 540 and the FLF. They travel to the northeast, paralleling some railroad tracks of Norfolk Southern Railway (NS), and immediately intersect the western terminus of SR 240. They curve to the east-southeast and leave the city limits of Geneva. They meet a former portion of SR 96. They wind through rural areas of the county and curve to the east-southeast. SR 90 then joins the concurrency just before they cross over the NS rail line. The highways curve to the south-southeast and meet another former portion of SR 96. SR 90, SR 96, SR 540, and the FLF cross over Black Creek before curving to the east-southeast. It then enters the southwestern portion of Junction City. They intersect Old Mauk Road, which leads to the main part of the city. They curve back to the east-northeast and cross over some railroad tracks of CSX. Almost immediately, they begin a curve to the southeast. They intersect the southern terminus of Buckner Road, a former portion of SR 96. At this intersection, SR 90 departs to the south. The other highways curve to the east-southeast and enter the west-central portion of Taylor County.

=== Taylor County ===
SR 96, SR 540, and the FLF travel just north of Carl Brown Lake at a point southwest of Howard. They meet a former portion of SR 96 before intersecting the western terminus of Brown Road, which leads to the main part of the community. Then, they meet Watson Road, which also leads to the main part of Howard. Here, they enter the southern part of the community. Immediately, they curve to the southeast and then leave Howard. They curve to the east-northeast and intersect the eastern terminus of Brown Road, which is a former portion of SR 96. They skirt along the southern edge of the Fall Line Sandhills Natural Area. An intersection with the western terminus of Industry Road leads to the Fall Line Sandhills East Wildlife Management Area. They begin a curve to the south-southeast and intersect the western terminus of a former portion of SR 96. Then, they meet SR 137 (Charing Road) before they curve back to the east-southeast. Just before an intersection with the northern terminus of Payne Farm Road and the southern terminus of Tower Street, they enter the far southern part of Butler. They intersect US 19/SR 3 (South Broad Street) before beginning a gradual curve to the northeast and leaving Butler. They curve to the east-northeast and intersect the eastern terminus of the former portion of SR 96 encountered on the western side of the city. The highways wind their way through rural areas of the country and enter the western part of Reynolds just west of an intersection with the southern terminus of Hicks Road. They travel to the east-southeast and intersect the western terminus of West William Wainwright Street, a former portion of SR 96. Just west of Sumter Street, they curve to the east. One block later, an intersection with Crawford Street leads to the U.S. Post Office for the town. Another block later, they intersect SR 128 (Winston Street). This intersection is also the eastern terminus of the former portion of SR 96 encountered near the western end of the town. At the intersection with Collins Street, they begin a curve to the east-northeast. The highways leave Reynolds and curve back to the east-southeast. After curving to the southeast, they cross over an unnamed creek on the Ward Edwards Bridge. Then, they cross over Black Bottom Creek. After a curve back to the east-northeast, they cross over the Flint River on a bridge that is also named Ward Edwards Bridge. At this crossing, they enter the southern portion of Crawford County.

=== Crawford and Peach counties ===
SR 96, SR 540, and the FLF curve to the east-southeast and then curve to the northeast. They travel through rural areas of the county and then on a bridge over railroad tracks of Norfolk Southern Railway. They begin a curve back to the east-northeast and then enter the southwestern part of Peach County. They encounter no intersections before entering the southeastern part of Crawford County. Immediately, they intersect Aldridge Street, the only intersection in this portion of Crawford County. After re-entering the southwestern portion of Peach County, they curve to the northeast and intersect the southern terminus of SR 49 Conn. Here, SR 96 splits off to the southeast, while SR 540 and the FLF take SR 49 Conn. to the north-northeast. SR 96 travels to the southeast and then curves to the due east. It slightly bends to the east-southeast and then enters the western part of Fort Valley. Just past William Drive, it curves to the east-northeast. Just past Westview Drive, it curves back to the east. At an intersection with Anderson Avenue, the highway begins a curve to the east-southeast. Then, it intersects US 341/SR 7/SR 49. Here, US 341/SR 7 and SR 96 begin a brief concurrency to the south-southeast. When SR 96 splits off, it travels to the southeast. Almost immediately, it crosses over some railroad tracks of Norfolk Southern Railway on the Gamaliel Hilson Memorial Overpass. Just pass this bridge is an intersection with the eastern terminus of SR 7 Conn. (Commercial Heights Parkway). At this intersection, SR 96 turns to the left and heads in an easterly direction. The highway travels through a residential area and then leaves the main part of the city. It curves to the east-northeast and crosses over Bay Creek. After winding back to the east, it travels through the unincorporated community of Miami Valley. It curves to the east-southeast and travels just south of Housers Millpond. It crosses over Mossy Creek and curves back to the east. It then has an interchange with Interstate 75 (I-75). It continues to the east and leaves the city limits of Fort Valley and enters the northwestern part of Houston County.

=== Houston, Twiggs, and Wilkinson counties ===
Immediately, SR 96 has an intersection with US 41/SR 11. It curves to the northeast and enters the southern part of Warner Robins. It curves back to the east and passes Houston County High School. After leaving Warner Robins, it winds its way to the east-southeast. It has an interchange with US 129/SR 247 (General Robert L. Scott Highway) in the far northern part of Bonaire. The highway passes the Waterford Golf Club. It then crosses over the Ocmulgee River on The Mark Fitzpatrick M. Quinean Bridge and enters Twiggs County. SR 96 crosses over Savage Creek on the Gen. Ezekiel Wimberly Memorial Bridge. It then crosses over some railroad tracks of Norfolk Southern Railway. It curves to the east-northeast and enters Tarversville, where it intersects US 23/US 129 Alt./SR 87. The highway curves to the northeast. After a curve back to the east-northeast, it travels just north of Faulk Lake. It curves back to the northeast and intersects the western terminus of SR 358 (Homer Chance Highway). It curves to a northerly direction and crosses over Richland Creek before an interchange with I-16. The highway heads to the north-northeast and enters the southern part of Jeffersonville. curves back to the northeast before crossing over Turkey Creek. It has an intersection with US 80/SR 19 and the eastern terminus of SR 18 (Magnolia Street). Here, SR 96 turns right and follows US 80/SR 19 to the southeast. Two blocks later, SR 96 splits off by turning left onto Church Street and travels to the northeast. Immediately, it crosses over some railroad tracks of CSX and passes a building housing the city hall. A few blocks later, it turns right onto Main Street and travels to the southeast. After curving to the east-northeast, the highway leaves the city limits of Jeffersonville. It curves to the east-southeast and enters the southwestern part of Wilkinson County. SR 96 curves to the northeast and travels through the unincorporated community of New Providence. It then winds its way through rural areas of the county until it meets its eastern terminus, an intersection with US 441/SR 29 at a point south-southeast of Irwinton.

=== National Highway System ===
The following portions of SR 96 are part of the National Highway System (NHS), a system of routes determined to be the most important for the nation's economy, mobility, and defense:

- From its western terminus to an intersection with the western terminus of Columbus Road, west-northwest of the central part of Butler
- From the eastern terminus of East Main Street, east of Butler, to the interchange with I-16, south-southeast of Jeffersonville

While SR 96 between Columbus Road and East Main Street is not part of the NHS, these two streets that make up a former portion of SR 96, are.

== Major intersections ==
County	Location	mi	km	Destinations	Notes
Talbot	Geneva	0.0	0.0	US 80 west / SR 22 west / SR 41 south / SR 540 west (Fall Line Freeway) – Buena Vista US 80 east / SR 22 east / SR 41 north (Geneva Highway) – Talbotton	Western end of SR 540 and Fall Line Freeway (FLF) concurrency; western terminus
Talbot	Geneva	0.2	0.32	SR 240 east – Five Points	Western terminus of SR 240
Talbot		0.7	1.1	Old Highway 96 east	Western terminus of Old Highway 96; former SR 96 east
Talbot		1.2	1.9	Old Highway 96 west	Eastern terminus of Old Highway 96; former SR 96 west
Talbot		5.1	8.2	SR 90 west – Talbotton	Western end of SR 90 concurrency
Talbot		5.5	8.9	Old SR 96 east – Junction City	Western terminus of Old SR 96; former SR 96 east
Talbot	Junction City	7.1	11.4	SR 90 east / Buckner Road north – Mauk, Junction City, Fall Line Sandhills West Wildlife Management Area	Eastern end of SR 90 concurrency; southern terminus of Buckner Road, which is former SR 96 west.
Taylor		10.0	16.1	Unnamed road east	Western terminus of unnamed road; former SR 96 east
Taylor		12.7	20.4	Brown Road west	Eastern terminus of Brown Road; former SR 96 west
Taylor		17.9	28.8	Old 96 Road east (Columbus Road east) – Taylor County Industrial Park	Western terminus of Old 96 Road (Columbus Road); former SR 96 east
Taylor		18.9	30.4	SR 137 (Charing Road) – Tazewell, Butler	
Taylor	Butler	20.3	32.7	US 19 / SR 3 (South Broad Street) – Ellaville, Americus, Butler, Thomaston, Business district	
Taylor		22.8	36.7	Old S.R. 96 west (East Main Street west)	Eastern terminus of Old S.R. 96 (East Main Street); former SR 96 west
Taylor	Reynolds	28.9	46.5	West William Wainwright Street east	Western terminus of West William Wainwright Street; former SR 96 east
Taylor	Reynolds	29.4	47.3	SR 128 (Winston Street) – Oglethorpe, Roberta	Former SR 96 west
Flint River		34.4– 34.5	55.4– 55.5	Ward Edwards Bridge	
Crawford	No major junctions				
Peach	No major junctions				
Crawford	No major junctions				
Peach		39.1	62.9	SR 49 Conn. east / SR 540 east (Fall Line Freeway) – Byron, Roberta	Eastern end of SR 540 and FLF concurrencies; western terminus of SR 49 Conn.
Peach	Fort Valley	42.4	68.2	US 341 north (SR 7 north) / SR 49 – Roberta, Byron, Montezuma, The Andersonville Trail	Western end of US 341/SR 7 concurrency; SR 49 north provides access to Navicent Health Medical Center of Peach County, located in Byron.
Peach	Fort Valley	42.6	68.6	US 341 south (SR 7 south) – Perry	Eastern end of US 341/SR 7 concurrency
Peach	Fort Valley	42.7– 42.7	68.7– 68.7	Gamaliel Hilson Memorial Overpass	Crossing over railroad tracks of Norfolk Southern Railway
Peach	Fort Valley	42.8	68.9	SR 7 Conn. west (Commercial Heights Parkway) – Massee Lane Gardens	Eastern terminus of SR 7 Conn.
Peach	Fort Valley	50.8– 51.0	81.8– 82.1	I-75 (SR 401) – Valdosta, Macon	I-75 exit 142; provides access to Navicent Health Medical Center of Peach County, located in Byron
Houston		52.3	84.2	US 41 / SR 11 – Perry, Macon	
Houston	Bonaire	59.8– 60.1	96.2– 96.7	US 129 / SR 247 (General Robert L. Scott Highway) – Hawkinsville, Warner Robins, Bonaire, Museum of Aviation	Interchange
Ocmulgee River		63.4– 63.5	102.0– 102.2	The Mark Fitzpatrick M. Quinean Bridge	
Twiggs		64.4– 64.4	103.6– 103.6	Gen. Ezekiel Wimberly Memorial Bridge	Crossing over Savage Creek
Twiggs		69.1	111.2	US 23 / US 129 Alt. / SR 87 – Cochran, Macon	
Twiggs		74.3	119.6	SR 358 east (Homer Chance Highway) – Danville	Western terminus of SR 358
Twiggs		76.5	123.1	I-16 east (Jim L. Gillis Highway east / SR 404 east) – Savannah	I-16 east exit 24
Twiggs		76.6– 76.6	123.3– 123.3	Deputy Richard Daniels Memorial Bridge; crossing over I-16 (Jim L. Gillis Highway / SR 404)	
Twiggs		76.6	123.3	I-16 west (Jim L. Gillis Highway west / SR 404 west) – Macon	I-16 west exit 24
Twiggs	Jeffersonville	81.6	131.3	US 80 west / SR 19 north – Macon SR 18 west (Magnolia Street)	Western end of US 80/SR 19 concurrency; eastern terminus of SR 18
Twiggs	Jeffersonville	81.8	131.6	US 80 east / SR 19 south / Church Street south	Eastern end of US 80/SR 19 concurrency
Wilkinson		94.9	152.7	US 441 / SR 29 – Dublin, East Dublin, McRae, Irwinton, McIntyre	Eastern terminus
1.000 mi = 1.609 km; 1.000 km = 0.621 mi: Concurrency terminus
