= Savage Creek =

Savage Creek may refer to:

- Savage Creek (Ocmulgee River tributary), a stream in Georgia
- Savage Creek (Rogue River tributary), a stream in Oregon
- Savage Creek (Tennessee), a stream in Tennessee
