= Interstate 16 =

Interstate Highway in Georgia, US

Interstate 16
- Jim Gillis Historic Savannah Parkway
- I-16 highlighted in red

Route information
- Maintained by GDOT
- Length: 166.81 mi (268.45 km)
- Existed: August 14, 1957–present
- NHS: Entire route

Major junctions
- West end: I-75 / SR 540 in Macon
- US 23 / US 80 / US 129 / SR 540 in Macon; US 319 / US 441 / SR 31 / SR 117 in Dublin; US 221 / SR 56 northeast of Soperton; US 1 / SR 4 / SR 46 in Oak Park; US 25 / US 301 / SR 73 / SR 555 near Register; US 280 / SR 30 southwest of Blitchton; I-95 in Pooler; I-516 / US 17 / US 80 / SR 21 / SR 25 / SR 26 in Savannah; US 17 / SR 404 Spur in Savannah
- East end: Montgomery Street in Savannah

Location
- Country: United States
- State: Georgia
- Counties: Bibb, Twiggs, Bleckley, Laurens, Treutlen, Emanuel, Candler, Bulloch, Bryan, Effingham, Chatham

Highway system
- Interstate Highway System; Main; Auxiliary; Suffixed; Business; Future; Georgia State Highway System; Interstate; US; State; Special
← SR 15W	→ SR 16
← SR 403	→ SR 405

Interstate 16 (I-16), also known as Jim Gillis Historic Savannah Parkway, is an east–west Interstate Highway located entirely within the US state of Georgia. It carries the hidden designation of State Route 404 (SR 404) for its entire length. I-16 travels from downtown Macon, at an interchange with I-75 and SR 540 to downtown Savannah at Montgomery Street (exit 167B). It also passes through or near the communities of Dublin, Metter, and Pooler. I-16's unsigned designation of SR 404 has a spur that is signed in Savannah.

The westernmost segment in Macon is part of the Fall Line Freeway, a highway that connects Columbus and Augusta. This segment may also be incorporated into the proposed eastern extension of I-14, which is currently entirely within Central Texas and may be extended to Augusta.

All of I-16 is included as part of the National Highway System, a system of routes determined to be the most important for the nation's economy, mobility, and defense.

== Route description ==
=== Macon-Bibb County ===
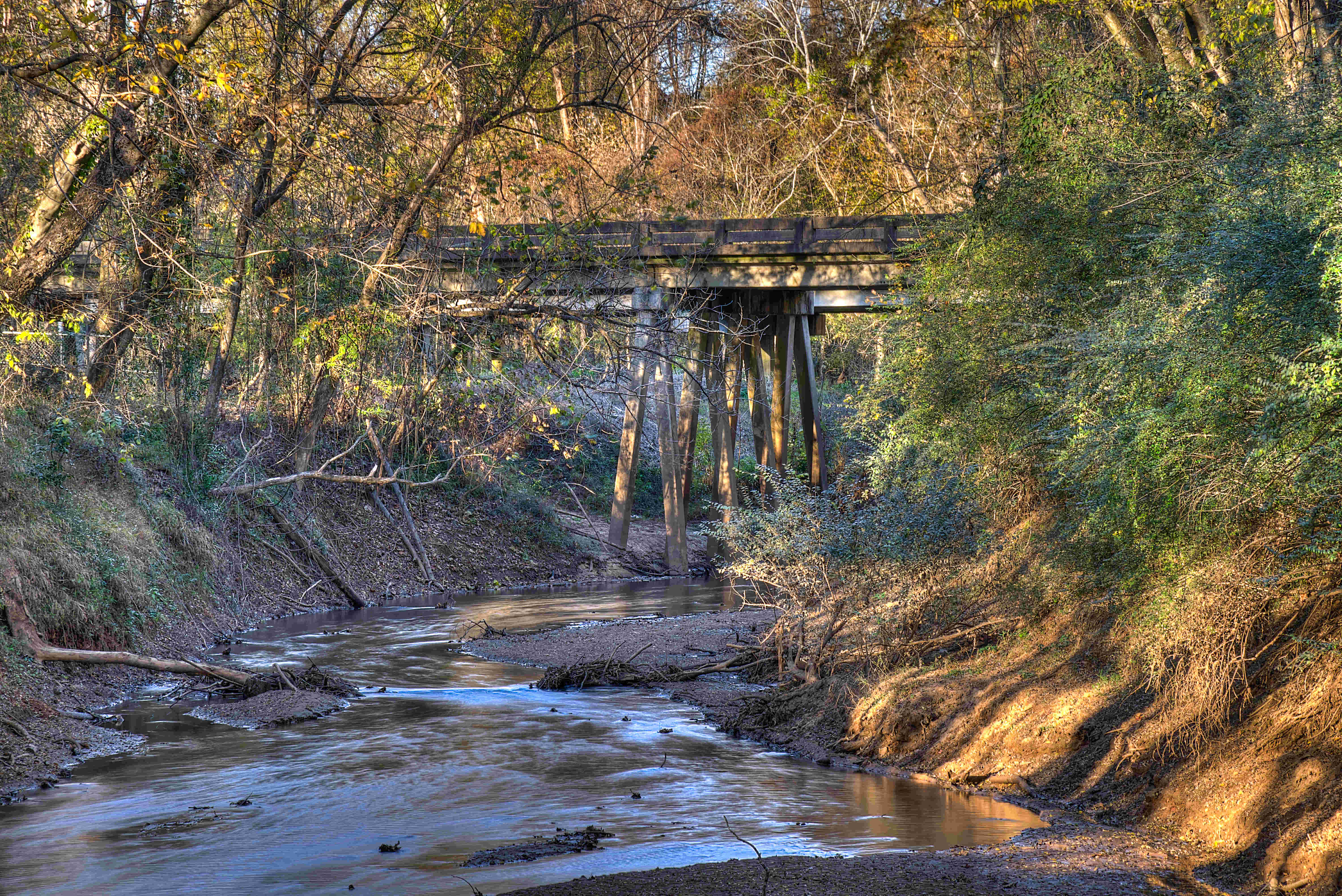
I-16 in Ocmulgee Mounds National Historical Park

I-16 begins at an interchange with I-75/SR 540, just northwest of downtown Macon, in Bibb County. Here, it begins a concurrency with SR 540. The Interstate and SR 540 proceed southeast, traveling just east of the downtown area. They cross over the Ocmulgee River and then have an interchange with US 23/US 129/SR 49 (Spring Street/North Avenue). Then, they have a partial interchange with SR 22 (2nd Street) that is only accessible from the westbound lanes. Almost immediately is an interchange with US 80/SR 87 (Martin Luther King Jr. Boulevard/Coliseum Drive). At this intersection, SR 540 departs the concurrency to the north-northeast. Within the eastern part of this interchange, the highway travels under a railroad bridge that carries railroad tracks of Norfolk Southern Railway. In the east-central part of Macon, I-16 travels through Ocmulgee Mounds National Historical Park but without direct access. Visitors need to first exit at the US 80/SR 87 exit. On the southern edge of the national monument, it crosses over Walnut Creek. It then travels on a bridge over some railroad tracks of CSX and Boggy Branch. After leaving Macon, I-16 curves to the south-southeast and has an interchange with US 23/U.S. Route 129 Alternate (US 129 Alt.)/SR 87 (Ocmulgee East Boulevard). In the interchange, the highway crosses over Swift Creek. It crosses over Stone Creek before entering Twiggs County.

=== Twiggs, Bleckley, and Laurens counties ===
I-16 curves back to the southeast and has an interchange with Sgoda Road. It crosses over Flat Creek and then has an interchange with Jeffersonville and Bullard roads. It curves to the east-southeast and crosses over Savage and Turvin creeks. It then curves back to the southeast. The highway has an interchange with SR 96. Almost immediately, it crosses over Richland Creek. It then has an interchange with SR 358. I-16 curves to the east-southeast and enters Bleckley County just before it has an interchange with SR 112 just south of Allentown. It then crosses over Rocky Creek just before entering Laurens County. The Interstate curves back to the southeast and crosses under SR 278 before it travels south of Montrose. It crosses over Bay Branch just before an interchange with SR 26. It then enters the southwestern part of Dudley. There, it has an interchange with SR 338. I-16 curves back to the east-southeast and crosses over Little Rocky Creek just before a rest area. Just to the west-northwest of a crossing of Turkey Creek, the westbound lanes have a rest area. These two rest areas are the only ones along the entire length of I-16. On the southwestern edge of Dublin, the highway has an interchange with SR 257. On the southern edge of the city are interchanges with US 319/US 441/SR 31 and SR 19 (Martin Luther King Jr. Drive). It then crosses over the Oconee River. It has an interchange with SR 199 (Old River Road) just before a crossing of Pughes Creek. Southeast of that is a crossing of Red Hill Creek. Just south of Rockledge, the highway crosses over Mercer Creek. On the eastern edge of the creek, it enters Treutlen County.

=== Treutlen County ===
I-16 curves to the east-northeast and crosses over some railroad tracks of CSX before an interchange with SR 29. It immediately curves back to the east-southeast. It crosses over Red Bluff Creek. Then is an interchange with SR 15/SR 78. The highway travels south of Sand Hill Lake before curving to the east-northeast. It crosses over Pendleton Creek and travels under a bridge that carries SR 86. Then, it begins to curve to the southeast. It has an interchange with US 221/SR 56. It crosses over Reedy Creek and curves to the east-southeast. It has an interchange with SR 297. At the overpass for SR 297, the highway enters Emanuel County.

=== Emanuel County ===
After the SR 297 interchange, I-16 heads more to the southeast. It curves to a nearly due east direction and crosses over the Ohoopee River. Just after crossing over some railroad tracks of Norfolk Southern Railway, it enters the city limits of Oak Park. It curves to the southeast and has an interchange with US 1/SR 4/SR 46. After this interchange, the highway begins to parallel SR 46. It curves to the east-southeast and crosses over Jacks Creek. Then, it enters Candler County.

=== Candler County ===
I-16 has an interchange with SR 57 (Aline Road). It crosses over Wolfe Creek and then heads to the east-northeast. It crosses over the Canoochee River and curves to a nearly due east direction. It crosses over Sams Creek before entering Metter. As soon as it enters Metter, it passes the Metter Municipal Airport. Right after the airport is an interchange with SR 23/SR 121. On the southeastern edge of Metter, I-16 travels under a bridge that carries SR 129. It crosses over 15 Mile Creek and then curves to the southeast. It crosses over Tenmile Creek and has an interchange with Pulaski–Excelsior Road just before entering Bulloch County.

=== Bulloch County ===
The Interstate curves to the east-southeast and has an interchange with US 25/US 301/SR 73 and SR 555 (Savannah River Parkway). Then, it crosses over Lotts and Little Lotts creeks. It then travels northeast of Nevils. It briefly curves to the east-southeast, where it has an interchange with SR 67, and then curves back to the southeast. It crosses over DeLoach Branch and then curves to the east-southeast. It crosses over Luke Branch and then Boggy Branch before curving to a nearly due east direction. It has an interchange with Ash Branch Church Road. After a crossing of Ash Branch, the highway curves to the east-southeast. It has an interchange with SR 119 just before entering Bryan County.

=== Bryan, Effingham, and Chatham counties ===
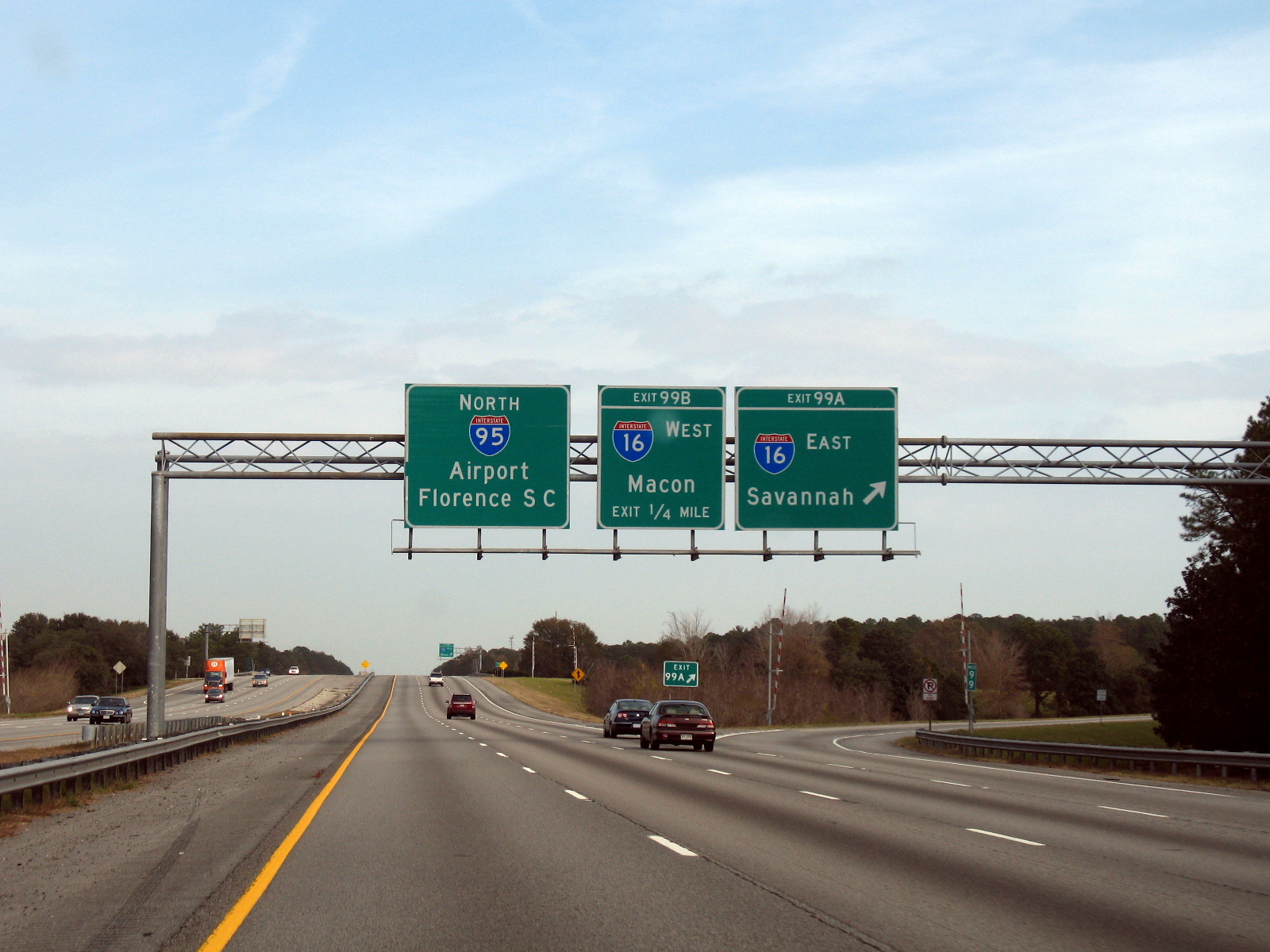
Northbound I-95 at the interchange with I-16 near Savannah

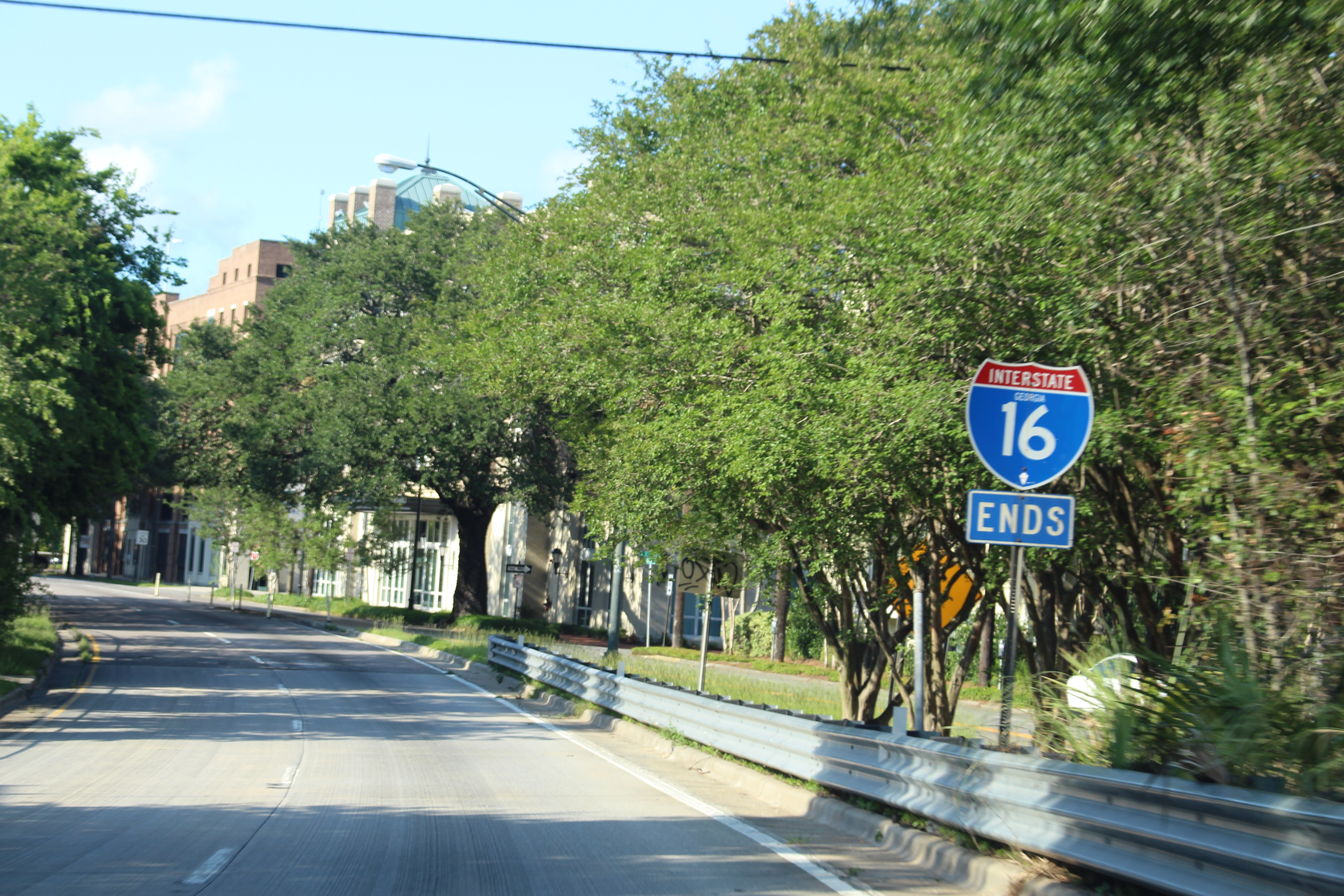
End of I-16 east in downtown Savannah

Almost immediately, the highway crosses over Black Creek. It then curves to the southeast and has an interchange with US 280/SR 30 southwest of Blitchton. It crosses over some railroad tracks of Georgia Central Railway and then crosses over the Ogeechee River, which marks the Effingham County line. It has an interchange with Old River Road south of Meldrim and then enters Chatham County. The first city in the county that I-16 enters is Bloomingdale. There, it has an interchange with the southern terminus of SR 17 Conn. (Jimmy DeLoach Parkway). It crosses over the Little Ogeechee River. It very briefly travels along the Bloomingdale–Pooler city line before entering Pooler proper. It has an interchange with Pooler Parkway. It crosses over the Savannah–Ogeechee Canal just before an interchange with I-95. Here, I-16 begins traveling along the southern edge of the city limits of Pooler. Right after the I-95 interchange, the highway crosses over the Hardin Canal. At an interchange with SR 307 (Dean Forest Road), I-16 begins traveling along the Savannah–Garden City line. It briefly enters the city limits of Savannah before traveling along the Savannah–Garden City line again. It has an interchange with the Chatham Parkway. It then reenters Savannah and curves to the east-southeast. It crosses over some railroad tracks of CSX just before an interchange with I-516/US 17/US 80/SR 21/SR 25/SR 26 (W.F. Lynes Parkway). Here, US 17 begins a concurrency with I-16. It crosses over the Springfield Canal just before a partial interchange with the former eastern terminus of SR 204 (West 37th Street). This interchange is only accessible from the eastbound lanes. I-16/US 17 curves to the northeast. At the next interchange, US 17 splits off, where State Route 404 Spur (SR 404 Spur) begins. This interchange also provides access to Gwinnett Street. The highway has an interchange with Martin Luther King Jr. Boulevard. The westbound access for this highway is at the eastern terminus. I-16 curves to the north-northeast and reaches its eastern terminus, an interchange with Montgomery Street in downtown Savannah. The construction of this interrupted sections of Berrien Street, West Jones Street, and West Charlton Street.

=== Miscellaneous notes ===
I-16 serves as a hurricane evacuation route for Savannah and other coastal areas. The road is designed for contraflow travel with railroad-type gates to block most entrance and exit ramps for the normally eastbound lanes. During hurricane evacuation, I-16 is converted into westbound traffic from Savannah to west of US 441 in Dublin (exit 51), a total of 125 miles (201 km).

== History ==
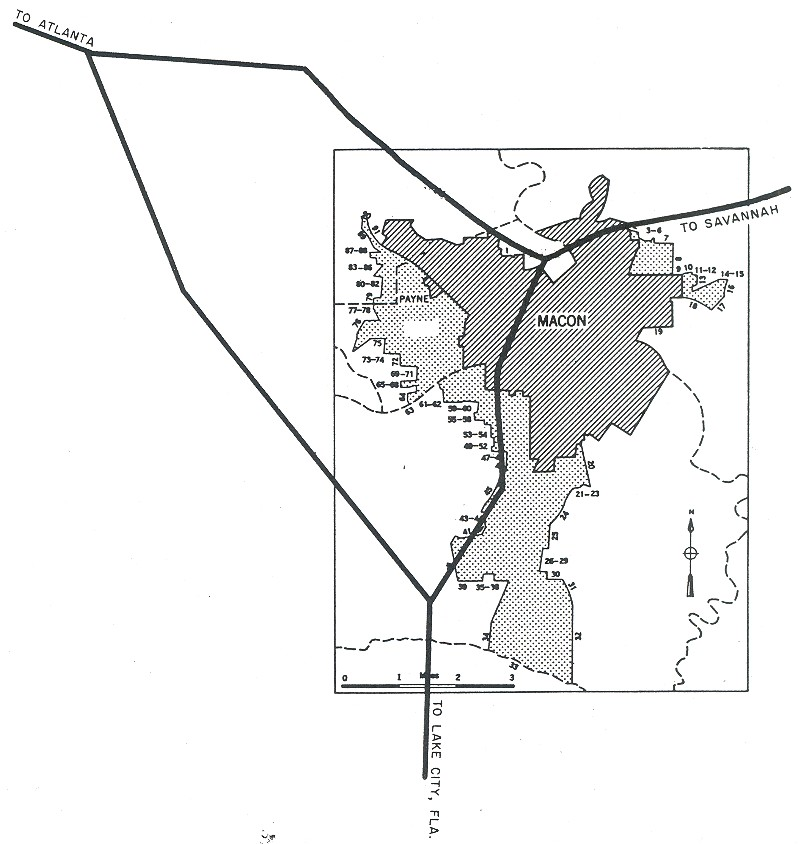
Macon, Georgia, 1955 Yellow Book with I-16 route (to Savannah)

The first part of I-16 opened October 11, 1966, to traffic between US 319 (exit 51) in Dublin to SR 29 (exit 67) near Rockledge. In 1968, the segment between US 280 to downtown Savannah was completed and opened. By the early 1970s, I-16 was completed from downtown Macon at I-75 to Jeffersonville Road near Danville. It was also extended from Dublin to Allentown. In 1973, the connection between Macon to Dublin was completed. The last part of the I-16 opened on September 22, 1978, placing it in Emanuel, Candler, and Bulloch counties and completing the connection between downtown Macon and Savannah.

=== 1990s ===
In 1999, Hurricane Floyd hit Georgia's coast. As a result, the eastbound I-16 lanes from Savannah to US 1 (exit 90) were opened to westbound traffic. This marked the first time I-16 was turned into a one-way Interstate. This contraflow traffic method has been used since, including in 2016 in evacuation efforts from Hurricane Matthew and 2017 for Hurricane Irma.

=== 2000s ===
Until 2000, the state of Georgia used the sequential interchange numbering system on all of its Interstate Highways. The first exit on each highway would begin with the number "1" and increase numerically with each exit. In 2000, the Georgia Department of Transportation switched to a mileage-based exit system, in which the exit number corresponded to the nearest milepost.

In 2001, the Georgia General Assembly passed a resolution to designate the Earl T. Shinhoster Interchange at the interchange with Martin Luther King Jr. Boulevard in Savannah in honor of Earl Shinhoster, who was a black civil rights activist. This interchange is located in the economic and cultural center for Black Savannah.

In 2003, the Georgia General Assembly passed a resolution to designate I-16 in honor of James L. Gillis Sr., a Democrat who served as a state representative, state senator, and director of the Georgia Department of Transportation, as the Jim Gillis Historic Savannah Parkway. Gillis's sons, Hugh and James Jr., also served as Democratic state legislators. Hugh was a state representative from 1941 to 1953 and a state senator from 1953 to 1955 and from 1963 to 2005. James Jr. was a state senator from 1945 to 1946.

=== 2020s ===
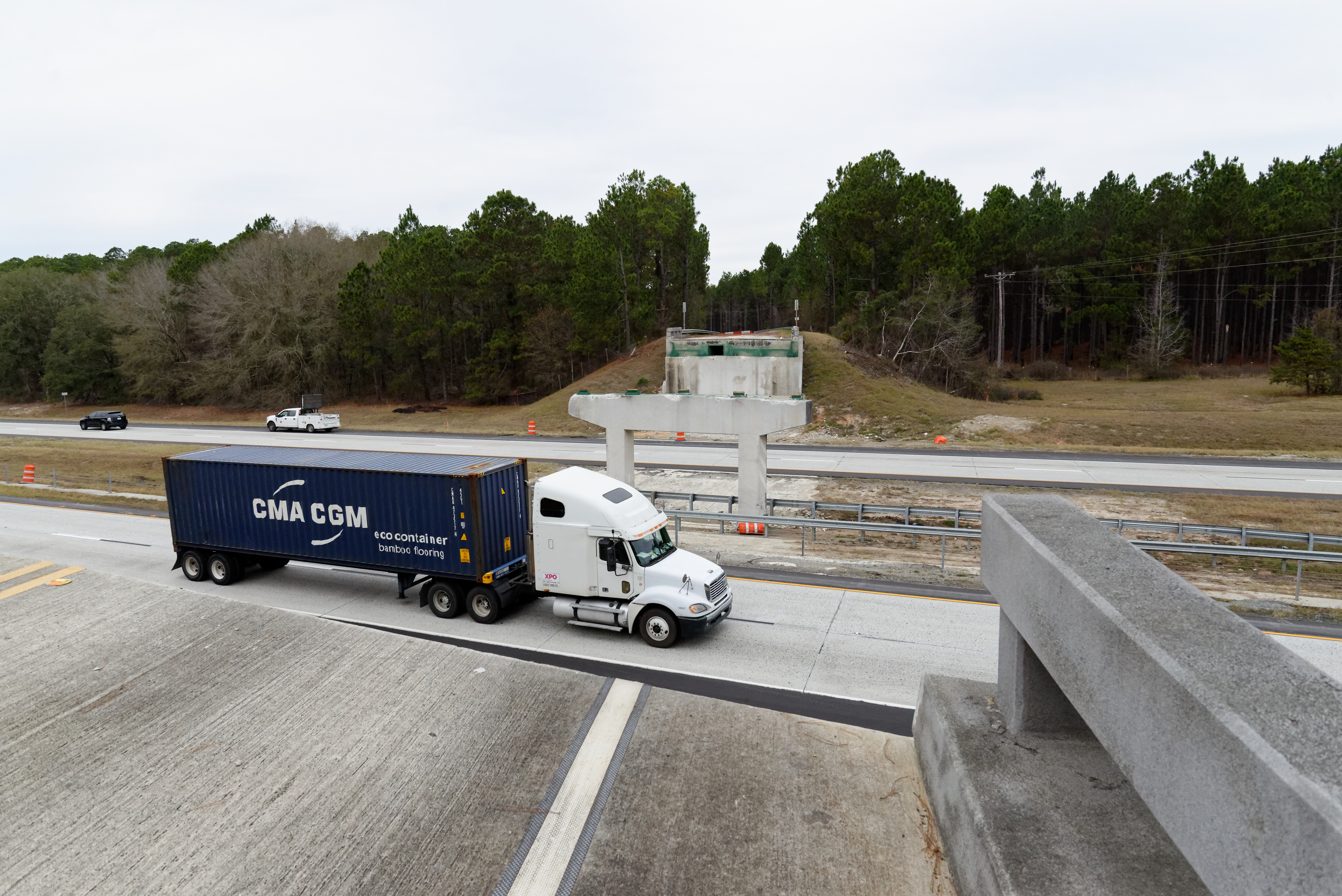
Collapsed bridge of SR 86 over I-16

On July 15, 2021, a truck, with its dump trailer raised, struck the overpass bridge of SR 86 near exit 78, causing the bridge deck to shift 6 feet (2 m). While no injuries were reported, the resulting damage prompted GDOT to close both directions of I-16 from exit 71 to exit 78 while the damaged bridge was being demolished. Both directions of I-16 were reopened within 48 hours of the incident. The reconstructed overpass was opened to traffic in late July 2022. Due to this, people had to take detours up to 10 minutes longer than the normal route through the towns of Adrian and Soperton.

== Future ==
=== I-95 interchange ===
Due to high congestion during rush hour in Savannah and many deadly car accidents, the Georgia Department of Transportation (GDOT) has undertaken a new construction project at the interchange of I-95 and I-16 (exit 157 on I-16), along with other I-16 improvements. The project, dubbed as the 16@95 Improvement Projects, includes:

- The widening of I-16 from two lanes in each direction to three lanes between the junctions with I-95 and I-516 (exit 164).
- The construction of a partial turbine interchange (whirlpool interchange) at the junction of I-16 and I-95, in which two existing loop ramps, from I-16 westbound to I-95 southbound, and from I-95 southbound to I-16 eastbound, will be replaced with turbine configuration ramps.
- The creation of a collector–distributor road on I-95 northbound to separate through traffic from cars exiting onto and entering from I-16.
- The construction of a two-lane emergency median cross-over for westbound I-16 traffic between Dean Forest Road/SR 307 (exit 160) and I-95, to assist in hurricane evacuations from Savannah.
- Ramp meters will be installed at exit 160 as well as exit 162 (Chatham Parkway)
- The reconstruction of six bridges, replacement of four bridges, and the construction of three new bridges near the area.
- The addition of new interchange lighting at the I-95 interchange and Intelligent Transportation System technology to provide real-time driving conditions to travelers.

The project, upon completion, is expected to result in a 32% decrease in I-16 congestion by 2030. Despite concerns from residents, no new noise barriers will be built along I-16 during the construction. A noise study concluded that barriers would not be necessary since traffic noise were not predicted to be over 66 dB(A).

The project is expected to cost around $295 million. Construction, which will be completed by Savannah Mobility Contractors JV, was set to begin in the second half of 2019 and be completed by the end of 2022. However, construction did not start until 2020, has been delayed multiple times, and is now expected to cost $317.4 million. The ramp from I-16 west to I-95 south was opened on March 23, 2023, with the ramp from I-95 south to I-16 east opened on June 2, 2023. Construction is ongoing as of January 29, 2024, with long-term detour routes in place.

=== I-75 interchange ===
The interchange of I-75 and I-16 is also undergoing construction as part of $500 million project, split into six phases, with the first three phases being worked on simultaneously. These phases were set to be completed by the end of 2021, but as of February 2023, only Phase 1 has been completed:

- Phase 1: A collector–distributor road was built on I-16 eastbound between the I-75 junction and Spring Street (exit 1A), including new bridges over the Ocmulgee River and Spring Street. The Spring Street loop ramp was temporarily closed and replaced with a temporary left turn onto I-16 westbound. Also, the bridge over the Ocmulgee River on Martin Luther King Jr. Boulevard was reconstructed and widened in this phase. This phase was completed in the summer of 2022.
- Phase 2: Construction includes improvements on I-75 between Hardeman Avenue (exit 164) and I-16 (exit 165) and the shifting of exit ramps from I-75 in each direction to I-16. Later in this phase, access to Spring Street for traffic coming from southbound I-75 via I-16 will be temporarily closed to allow for completion of the collector–distributor system.
- Phase 3: A new collector–distributor road is being built along I-75 north through the I-16 interchange, along with a new westbound collector–distributor road from Spring Street along I-16 over the Ocmulgee River and portions of other ramps.

Construction on Phase 1 was completed by C.W. Matthews at a cost of $63 million, while construction on Phase 2 and Phase 3 is being completed by E.R. Snell Company for $156 million.

Three additional phases are included in the project, which ultimately are intended to help improve access to and from downtown Macon and Gray Highway via the currently-underutilized Second Street bridge, reducing congestion on Spring Street and North Avenue:

- Phase 4: Bids for a construction contract are scheduled to occur in 2021. Second Street will be widened and ramps from and to eastbound I-16 will be constructed. Construction from Phase 1 and Phase 2 will be completed, along with the collector–distributor road through the I-75 interchange along eastbound I-16 to the Coliseum Drive/Martin Luther King Jr. Boulevard exit. Access from I-75 southbound via I-16 to Spring Street will be reopened at the conclusion of this phase.
- Phase 5: Bids for a construction contract are scheduled to occur in 2021. During this phase, the Spring Street loop ramp will be reopened and the temporary left turn lane on northbound Spring Street to I-16 westbound will be closed permanently. Also, Phase 3 construction will be completed, and a connection to the north-to-east ramp from Phase 2 will be built. This phase also includes the completion of the westbound collector–distributor road from Phase 3, along with a new ramp from Second Street to westbound I-16.
- Phase 6: Bids for a construction contract are scheduled to occur in 2023. A 1,600-foot (490 m) tunnel will be built for the Norfolk Southern Railroad under I-75. All remaining construction will be completed in this phase.

Also as a part of this project, GDOT spent $12 million in the Pleasant Hill neighborhood to help mitigate the effect of the construction and new highway ramps. The construction, which was completed in the summer of 2018, included the creation of two new parks and the transformation of Penniman House, the childhood home of the late musician Little Richard, into a community resource center. This project was labeled as Phase 1B.

==== Effect of construction on Port of Savannah traffic ====
According to GDOT, with the expansion of I-16 at its interchanges with I-75, I-95, and I-516, the estimated increase in gross state product (GSP) would be $9.1 million at a cost of $1.95 million. In addition, employment would increase annually by 2,426, and the return on investment (ROI) would be 4.7.

=== Possible removal of the Earl T. Shinhoster Bridge ===
In Savannah, city and state officials are currently considering removing the Earl T. Shinhoster Bridge, which carries eastbound traffic over Martin Luther King Jr. Boulevard and onto Montgomery Street at the eastern terminus of I-16. The construction of the I-16 flyover ramps into Savannah in the 1960s led to the removal of Union Station, as well as two full city blocks, which had severe negative impacts on the African American community. A study about possibly removing the ramps was approved and funded by the Savannah City Council in December 2023. The study, which is listed as the I-16 Ramp Removal Study, will be managed by the Metropolitan Planning Commission, the Georgia Department of Transportation (GDOT), and the Federal Highway Administration. In March 2024, Georgia U.S. Senators Jon Ossoff and Raphael Warnock announced that $1.8 million in federal funding had been allocated toward the planning of the project.

== Exit list ==
County	Location	mi	km	Old exit	New exit	Destinations	Notes
Bibb	Macon	0.0	0.0	1	0	I-75 (SR 401) / SR 540 west (Fall Line Freeway) – Atlanta, Valdosta, Columbus	Western end of SR 540 concurrency; western terminus; left exit 0 is for I-75 south; westbound exit and eastbound entrance; I-75 exit 165
Bibb	Macon	0.7	1.1	2	1A	US 23 / US 129 / SR 49 (Spring Street / SR 11 / SR 19) – Milledgeville	No westbound exit or eastbound entrance from southbound Spring Street
Bibb	Macon	1.1	1.8	2	1A	SR 22 (Second Street North) to US 129 (Gray Highway) / SR 49 (Spring Street) / US 23 (Emery Highway) – Milledgeville	Former westbound exit to Second Street northbound only; replaced by Coliseum Drive ramps
Bibb	Macon	1.0	1.6	3	1B	SR 22 (Second Street) to US 129 / SR 49 – Macon	Westbound exit only
Bibb	Macon	1.3	2.1	4	2	US 80 / SR 87 (Coliseum Drive / Martin Luther King Jr. Boulevard) / SR 540 east (Fall Line Freeway)	Eastern end of SR 540 concurrency; Phil Walden Memorial Interchange
Bibb		5.4	8.7	5	6	US 23 / US 129 Alt. (Ocmulgee East Boulevard / Golden Isles Highway / SR 87) – Macon Downtown Airport	
Twiggs		11.3	18.2	6	12	Sgoda Road – Huber	
Twiggs		17.4	28.0	7	18	Bullard Road – Jeffersonville	
Twiggs		23.1	37.2	8	24	SR 96 – Jeffersonville, Tarversville	
Twiggs		26.8	43.1	9	27	SR 358 – Danville	
Bleckley		31.6	50.9	10	32	SR 112 – Allentown, Montrose	
Laurens		38.4	61.8	11	39	SR 26 – Cochran, Montrose	
Laurens	Dudley	40.9	65.8	12	42	SR 338 – Dexter, Dudley	
Laurens		44.5	71.6	Rest area			
Laurens		47.7	76.8	13	49	SR 257 – Dublin, Dexter	
Laurens		50.3	81.0	14	51	US 319 / US 441 (SR 31) – Dublin, McRae	
Laurens		52.6	84.7	15	54	SR 19 – East Dublin, Dublin	
Laurens		57.4	92.4	16	58	SR 199 (Old River Road) – Lothair, East Dublin	
Treutlen		65.9	106.1	17	67	SR 29 – Vidalia, Soperton	
Treutlen		70.1	112.8	18	71	SR 15 / SR 78 – Soperton, Adrian	
Treutlen		76.5	123.1	19	78	US 221 / SR 56 – Swainsboro, Soperton	
Treutlen–Emanuel county line		83.0	133.6	20	84	SR 297 – Vidalia	
Emanuel	Oak Park	88.1	141.8	21	90	US 1 / SR 4 / SR 46 – Swainsboro, Lyons	
Candler		96.7	155.6	22	98	SR 57 – Reidsville, Swainsboro, Stillmore	
Candler	Metter	102.5	165.0	23	104	SR 23 / SR 121 – Metter, Reidsville	
Candler		109.7	176.5	24	111	Pulaski–Excelsior Road	
Bulloch		114.9	184.9	25	116	US 25 / US 301 (SR 73 / west branch of Savannah River Parkway north/ SR 555 north) – Statesboro, Claxton	Southern terminus of unsigned SR 555 and the western section of Savannah River Parkway
Bulloch		125.0	201.2	26	127	SR 67 (SR 46 west) – Pembroke, Fort Stewart, Statesboro	Eastern terminus of SR 46
Bulloch		130.2	209.5	27	132	Ash Branch Church Road	
Bulloch		134.9	217.1	28	137	SR 119 – Springfield, Pembroke, Fort Stewart	
Bryan	Ellabell	140.2	225.6	29	143	US 280 (SR 30) to US 80 (SR 26) – Pembroke	
Bryan	Ellabell	141.5	227.7	Truck weigh stations			
Effingham		145.7	234.5	30	148	Old River Road to US 80 (SR 26)	
Chatham	Bloomingdale	149.6	240.8	31	152	SR 17 Conn. north (Jimmy DeLoach Parkway east) / Little Neck Road south – Bloomingdale	Southern terminus of SR 17 Conn.; former southern terminus of SR 17; northern terminus of Little Neck Road; western terminus of Jimmy DeLoach Parkway; exit signed as “Bloomingdale Road”
Chatham	Pooler	151.9	244.5		155	Savannah/Hilton Head International Airport, Pooler	Pooler Parkway
Chatham	Pooler	154.1	248.0	32	157	I-95 (SR 405) – Brunswick, Jacksonville, Florence, Savannah/Hilton Head International Airport	Signed as exits 157A (south) & 157B (north) eastbound; exit 157 westbound; I-95 exit 99; Clarence Thomas Interchange
Chatham	Garden City	156.7	252.2	33	160	SR 307 (Dean Forest Road)	
Chatham	Savannah	158.9	255.7	33A	162	Chatham Parkway	
Chatham	Savannah	160.3	258.0	34A	164A	I-516 east / US 17 south / US 80 east / SR 21 south (W.F. Lynes Parkway / SR 25 south / SR 26 east / SR 421 east)	Western end of US 17 concurrency; I-516 exit 5
Chatham	Savannah	160.5	258.3	34B	164B	I-516 west / US 80 west / SR 21 north / SR 25 north (W.F. Lynes Parkway / SR 26 / SR 421 west) – Garden City	I-516 exit 5
Chatham	Savannah	161.6	260.1	35	165	West 37th Street / Abercorn Street	Eastbound exit and westbound entrance; former eastern terminus of SR 204
Chatham	Savannah	161.9	260.6	36	166	US 17 north / SR 404 Spur east / Gwinnett Street / Louisville Road – Charleston	Eastern end of US 17 concurrency; eastbound exit and westbound entrance; former US 17 Alt.; western terminus of SR 404 Spur
Chatham	Savannah	162.3	261.2	37A	167A	M. L. King Jr. Boulevard / Gaston Street	Eastbound exit and westbound entrance; Earl T. Shinhoster Interchange; former US 17 south/US 80 east/SR 25 south/SR 26 east
Chatham	Savannah					Earl T. Shinhoster Bridge	Bridge over Martin Luther King Jr. Boulevard for the eastbound lanes only
Chatham	Savannah	162.5	261.5	37B	167B	Montgomery Street – Savannah Civic Center, Downtown Savannah	Eastern terminus; eastbound exit; former US 17 north/US 80 west/SR 25 north/SR 26 west
1.000 mi = 1.609 km; 1.000 km = 0.621 mi: Closed/former; Concurrency terminus; Incomplete access

== Related routes ==
=== State Route 404 Spur ===
State Route 404 Spur
- Location: Savannah
- Length: 3.070 mi (4.941 km)
- Existed: 1989–present

State Route 404 Spur (SR 404 Spur) is a 3.07-mile-long (4.94 km) spur route that travels from I-16 exit 166 northward along US 17 to the South Carolina state line. As its number suggests, it is a spur from SR 404, the unsigned route that is designated along the full length of I-16. However, SR 404 Spur is actually a signed highway. Near the northern end is the Talmadge Memorial Bridge.

Exit list
The entire route is in Savannah, Chatham County. All exits are unnumbered.

mi	km	Destinations	Notes
0.000	0.000	I-16 / US 17 south / Montgomery Street – Downtown Savannah	Southern end of US 17 concurrency; southern terminus; northbound exit and southbound entrance; I-16 exit 166
0.324	0.521	Gwinnett Street	Northbound exit and southbound entrance; interchange
0.952	1.532	Louisville Road – Visitors Center	Northbound exit and southbound entrance; interchange
1.277	2.055	SR 25 Conn. (Oglethorpe Avenue) – Savannah	Southbound exit and northbound entrance; interchange
1.426– 2.489	2.295– 4.006	Talmadge Memorial Bridge over Savannah River	
2.569	4.134	Hutchinson Island, Convention Center	Interchange
3.070	4.941	US 17 north – Hardeeville, Charleston	Northern end of US 17 concurrency; northern terminus at the South Carolina state line (Back River bridge)
1.000 mi = 1.609 km; 1.000 km = 0.621 mi: Concurrency terminus; Incomplete access

=== Interstate 516 ===
Interstate 516
- Location: Garden City–Savannah
- Length: 6.49 mi (10.44 km)
- Existed: 1985–present

Interstate 516 (I-516) is a 6.49-mile-long (10.44 km) auxiliary route from SR 21 (Augusta Road) in Garden City to DeRenne Avenue in Savannah. It is also known as W.F. Lynes Parkway and has an unsigned designation of State Route 421 (SR 421).
