= Allentown, Georgia =

- City
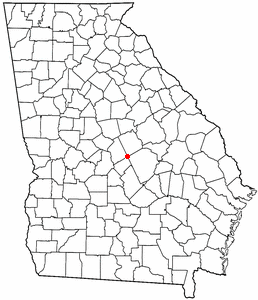
- Location of Allentown, Georgia
- Coordinates: 32°35′31″N 83°13′41″W
- Country: United States
- State: Georgia
- Counties: Wilkinson, Twiggs, Laurens, Bleckley

Area
  - Total: 4.60 sq mi (11.92 km^{2})
  - Land: 4.58 sq mi (11.86 km^{2})
  - Water: 0.027 sq mi (0.07 km^{2})
- Elevation: 430 ft (130 m)

Population (2020)
  - Total: 195
  - Density: 42.6/sq mi (16.45/km^{2})
- Time zone: UTC−5 (Eastern (EST))
  - Summer (DST): UTC−4 (EDT)
- ZIP Code: 31003
- Area code: 478
- FIPS code: 13-01500
- GNIS feature ID: 0310468
- Website: cityofallentownga.org

Allentown is a city in Bleckley, Laurens, Twiggs, and Wilkinson counties in the U.S. state of Georgia, primarily in Wilkinson County. As of the 2010 census, the city had a population of 169, down from 287 at the 2000 census. In 2020, its population was 195. The Twiggs County portion is part of the Macon metropolitan statistical area, while the Laurens County portion is part of the Dublin micropolitan statistical area. The remaining Wilkinson and Bleckley County portions are not part of any metropolitan or micropolitan area.

== History ==
Allentown was named in 1891 when the Macon, Dublin & Savannah Railroad was extended to that point. John Allen, an early postmaster, gave the town his last name. Allentown was incorporated in 1901.

== Geography ==
The center of Allentown and most of the buildings are in the southern corner of Wilkinson County, but the city limits extend west into Twiggs County, south into Bleckley County, and southeast into Laurens County.

U.S. Route 80 passes through the center of town, leading northwest 10 miles (16 km) to Jeffersonville and southeast 20 miles (32 km) to Dublin. Interstate 16 passes through the south end of the city, with access from Exit 32 (State Route 112). I-16 leads northwest 31 miles (50 km) to Macon and southeast 134 miles (216 km) to Savannah. State Route 112 passes through the center of Allentown as Balls Ferry Road, leading northeast 10 miles (16 km) to U.S. Route 441 at Nicklesville and southwest 18 miles (29 km) to Cochran.

According to the United States Census Bureau, Allentown has a total area of 4.6 square miles (11.9 km^{2}), of which 0.03 square miles (0.07 km^{2}), or 0.55%, are water.

The north side of Allentown drains to Devils Branch, a tributary of Turkey Creek and part of the Oconee River watershed. The south side drains to Little Rocky Creek, a tributary of Rocky Creek, then Turkey Creek and the Oconee.

== Demographics ==
Historical population
Census	Pop.	Note	%±
1960	450		—
1970	295		−34.4%
1980	321		8.8%
1990	273		−15.0%
2000	287		5.1%
2010	169		−41.1%
2020	195		15.4%
U.S. Decennial Census; 1850–1870 1870–1880; 1890–1910 1920–1930; 1940 1950 1960; 1970 1980 1990; 2000

=== Racial and ethnic composition ===
Allentown city, Georgia – Racial and ethnic composition Note: the US Census treats Hispanic/Latino as an ethnic category. This table excludes Latinos from the racial categories and assigns them to a separate category. Hispanics/Latinos may be of any race.
Race / Ethnicity (NH = Non-Hispanic)	Pop 2000	Pop 2010	Pop 2020	% 2000	% 2010	% 2020
White alone (NH)	183	111	115	63.76%	65.68%	58.97%
Black or African American alone (NH)	101	49	64	35.19%	28.99%	32.82%
Native American or Alaska Native alone (NH)	0	0	0	0.00%	0.00%	0.00%
Asian alone (NH)	0	0	0	0.00%	0.00%	0.00%
Native Hawaiian or Pacific Islander alone (NH)	0	0	0	0.00%	0.00%	0.00%
Other race alone (NH)	0	0	1	0.00%	0.00%	0.51%
Mixed race or Multiracial (NH)	1	4	13	0.35%	2.37%	6.67%
Hispanic or Latino (any race)	2	5	2	0.70%	2.96%	1.03%
Total	287	169	195	100.00%	100.00%	100.00%

=== 2000 census ===
As of the census of 2000, there were 287 people, 121 households, and 72 families residing in the town. In 2020, its population declined to 195.

In 2023, of the 195 people who lived in Allentown, 110 of them lived in Wilkinson County and 59 of them lived in Twiggs County. No persons lived in the portions in Bleckly and Laurens counties.

== Education ==
The Wilkinson County portion is in the Wilkinson County School District.

The Twiggs County portion is in the Twiggs County School District.

The Bleckley County portion is in the Bleckley County School District, and the Laurens County portion is in the Laurens County School District. As of 2023 there were no residents in the parts in Bleckley and Laurens counties.
