= Elam–Camp House =

Historic house in Georgia, United States

- Elam-Camp House
- U.S. National Register of Historic Places
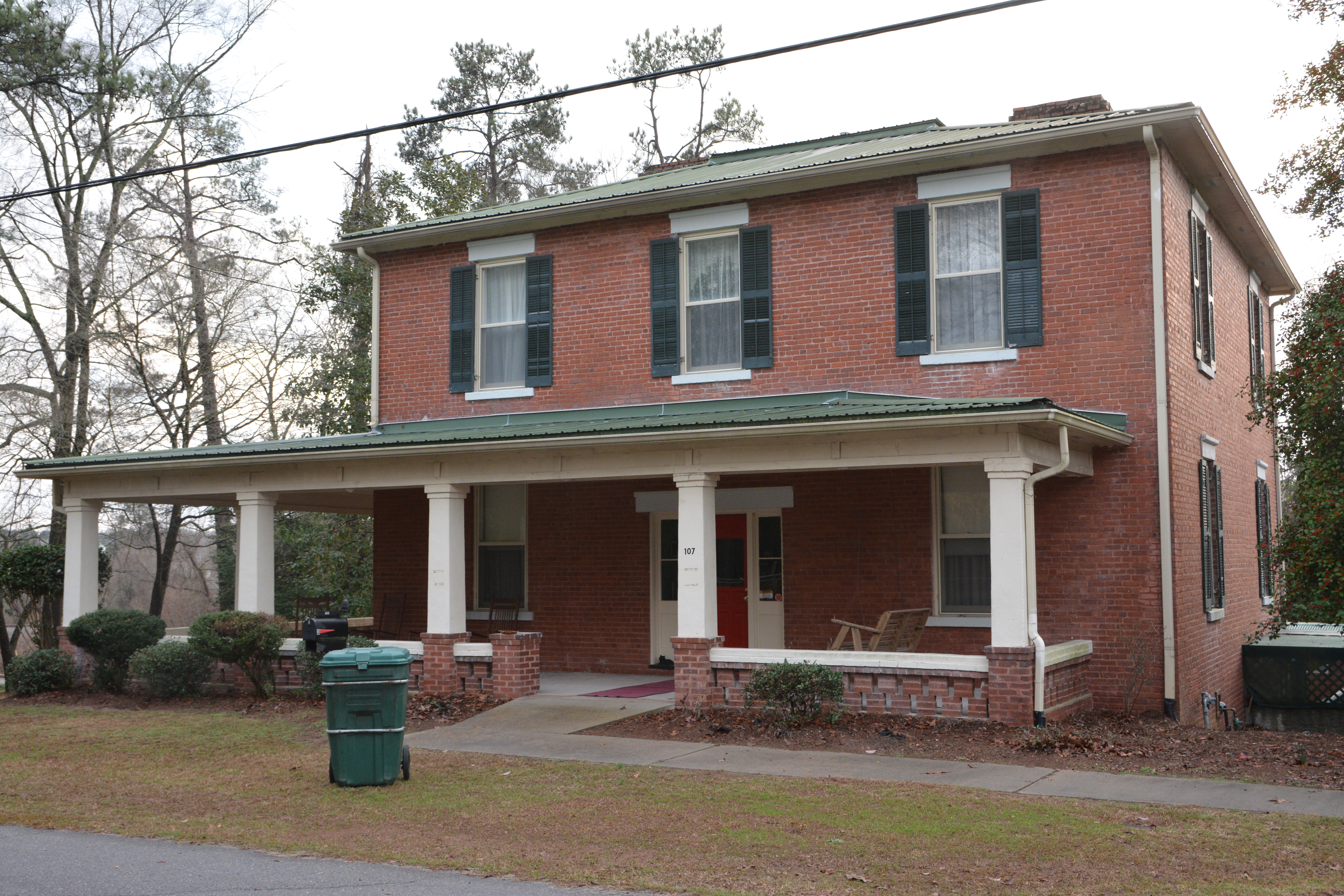

- Location within Georgia
- Location: 216 Jackson St., Gordon, Georgia (house shows 107)
- Coordinates: 32.88333°N 83.33679°W
- Area: less than one acre
- Built: 1915
- Built by: McMillan, Robert
- Architect: McMillan, Robert
- Architectural style: Georgian
- NRHP reference No.: 82002498
- Added to NRHP: June 17, 1982

Elam–Camp House in Gordon, Georgia is a brick Georgian Revival-style house that was built in 1915. It was designed and built by Robert McMillan, owner of the McMillan Brick Company of Milledgeville.

It is located at 216 Jackson Street (the house number is 107 as of 2017) in Gordon, in Wilkinson County, Georgia. It was added to the National Register of Historic Places in 1982.

The house was home of William S. Elam (1846-1923), a veteran of the American Civil War. Elam was a section foreman for the Central of Georgia Railroad in nearby Baldwin County. William R. E. Camp was owner of the house in 1982.

It was the first brick house in Gordon and is a good local example of the Georgian Revival style.

== See also ==
- National Register of Historic Places listings in Wilkinson County, Georgia
