= 1920 United States presidential election in Georgia =

- November 2, 1920

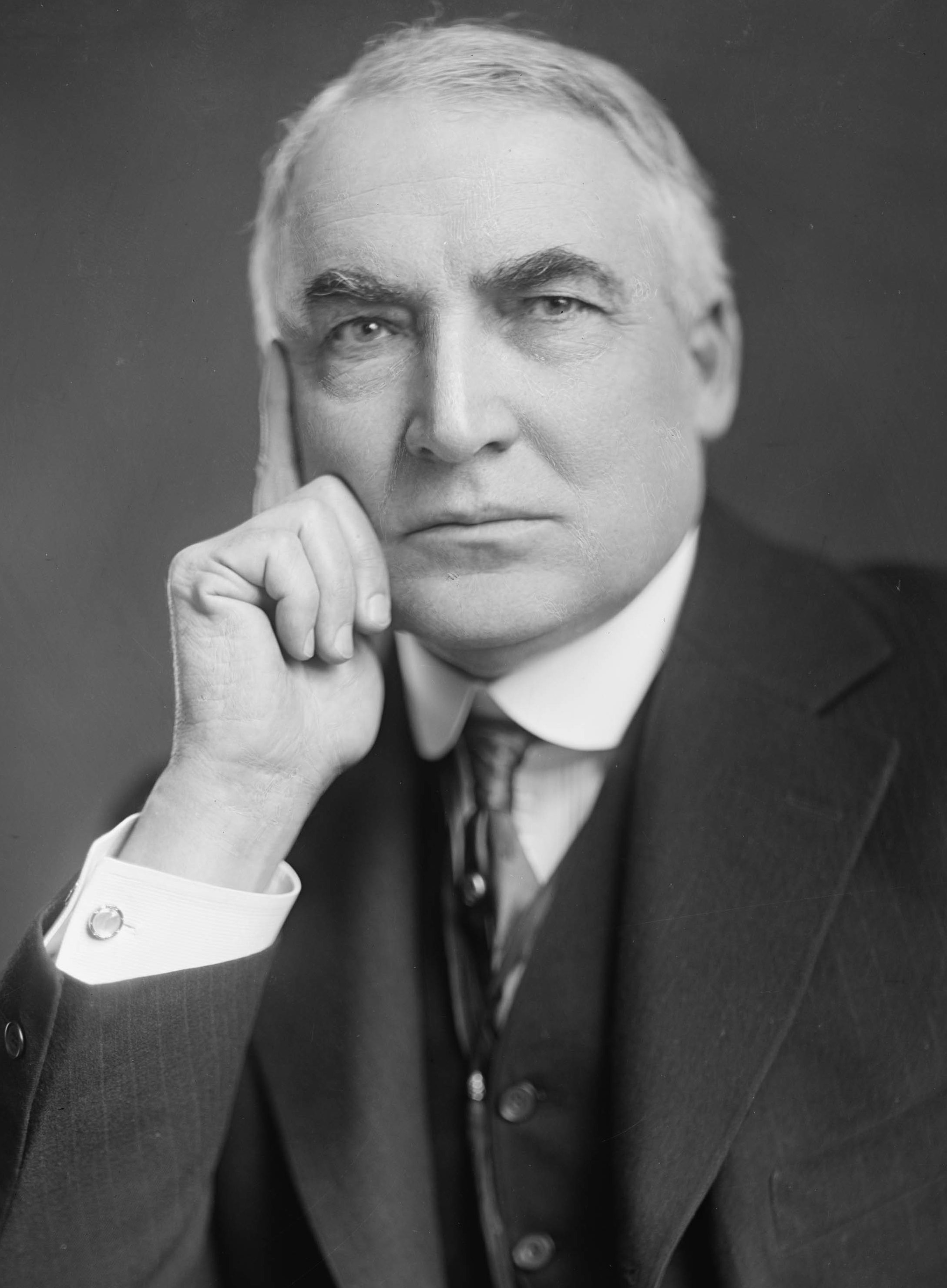
Nominee	James M. Cox	Warren Harding
Party	Democratic	Republican
Home state	Ohio	Ohio
Running mate	Franklin Roosevelt	Calvin Coolidge
Electoral vote	14	0
Popular vote	107,162	41,089
Percentage	72.06%	27.63%
County results
Cox
50–60%
60–70%
70–80%
80–90%
90–100%
Harding
50–60%
60–70%
70–80%
President before election
Woodrow Wilson
Democratic
Elected President
Warren Harding
Republican

The 1920 United States presidential election in Georgia took place on November 2, 1920, as part of the wider United States presidential election. Voters chose 14 representatives, or electors, to the Electoral College, who voted for president and vice president.

With the exception of a handful of historically Unionist North Georgia counties – chiefly Fannin but also to a lesser extent Pickens, Gilmer and Towns – Georgia since the 1880s had been a one-party state dominated by the Democratic Party. Disfranchisement of almost all African-Americans and most poor whites had made the Republican Party virtually nonexistent outside of local governments in those few hill counties, and the national Democratic Party served as the guardian of white supremacy against a Republican Party historically associated with memories of Reconstruction. The only competitive elections were Democratic primaries, which state laws restricted to whites on the grounds of the Democratic Party being legally a private club.

Nonetheless, the largely white but secessionist “upcountry” regions of the state – lying immediately south of the few substantially unionist counties – had seen strong opposition to the policies of Democratic President Woodrow Wilson since World War I broke out. Wilson had attempted to purge anti-war Southern Democrats in the 1918 midterm elections, and with the passage of the Nineteenth Amendment and his League of Nations proposal, further hostility to him emerged in Georgia.

All these factors meant Cox lost significantly in the upcountry areas of the state where Harding carried many areas that had supported Populist Thomas E. Watson or Progressives in recent elections. Elsewhere, however, partisan loyalties remained extremely strong, so that Harding's gain was less than most other Southern states and Georgia surpassed Louisiana – where a major anti-Wilson revolt was occurring at the polls in Acadiana – as the third-most Democratic state behind Mississippi and South Carolina.

== Democratic primary ==
1920 Georgia Democratic presidential primary
- April 20, 1920
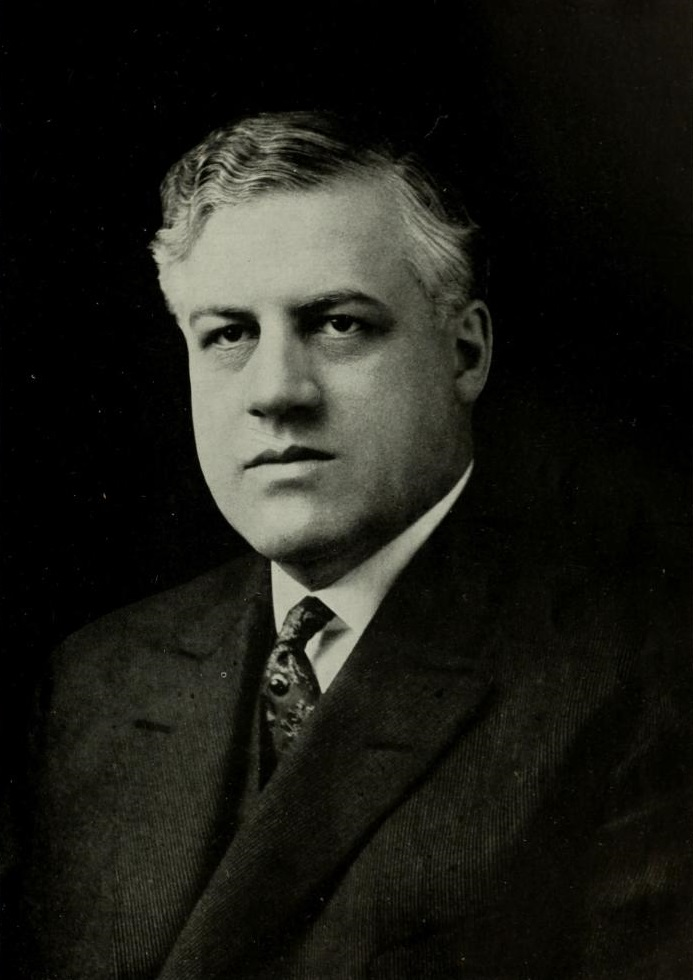

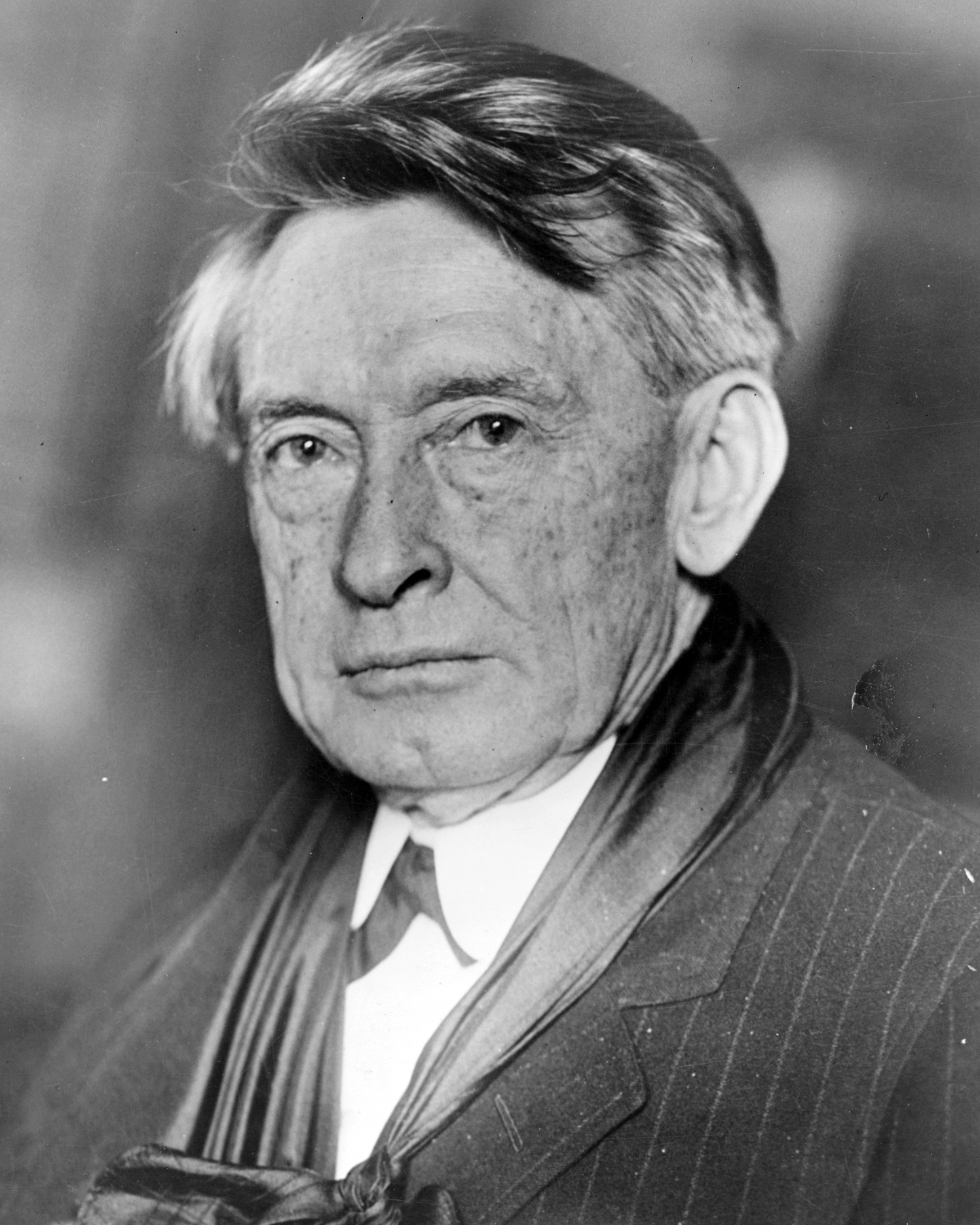

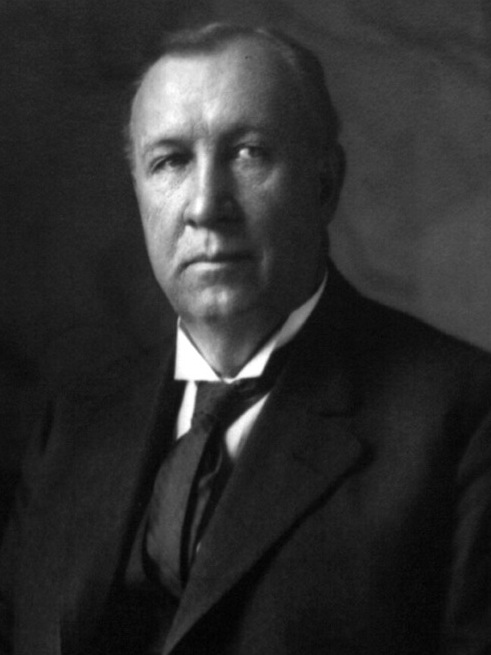
Candidate	A. Mitchell Palmer	Thomas E. Watson	Hoke Smith
Home state	Pennsylvania	Georgia	Georgia
Electoral vote	144	132	110
Delegate count	28	0	0
Popular vote	48,460	51,974	45,568
Percentage	33.19%	35.60%	31.21%
Election results by county
Palmer:
30-40%
40-50%
50-60%
60-70%
70-80%
80-90%
Watson:
30-40%
40-50%
50-60%
60-70%
70-80%
80-90%
Smith:
30-40%
40-50%
50-60%
60-70%
70-80%
No vote/data

A primary for the Democratic presidential candidate was held in Georgia on April 20, 1920. United States Attorney General A. Mitchell Palmer defeated Thomas E. Watson and Hoke Smith, despite losing the popular vote to Watson. Polls did not open in Wilkinson County, leading Chairman John Flynt of the Democratic State Executive Committee to appoint two Palmer delegates from that county in accordance with primary rules. The subcommittee of the State Executive Committee, empowered to set the rules for all primaries other than gubernatorial or senatorial contests, had determined that the Georgia's delegates to the 1920 Democratic National Convention would be allocated to the candidate receiving the highest number of county unit votes under the county unit system. This selection would be formalized at the Georgia presidential convention in Atlanta on May 18, along with other matters. B. M. Blackburn, a representative of Watson, stated that it "would be utterly unfair and ridiculous for a minority to control the convention". Smith claimed that he had "no idea that the convention would consider itself bound by any rules except its own."

Watson contested the results in Chatham, claiming that his name had been scratched off the ballots; in Wilkinson, as there had been no primary election; and in Bulloch, asserting that his supporters had been unable to vote in a precinct where no ballot box was provided. Smith contested Murray and Atkinson, claiming that the county executive committees had arbitrarily excluded certain precincts.

At the convention, the majority of delegates, who were composed of Smith and Watson supporters, ignored the rule passed by the Democratic state executive committee, viewing the convention as sovereign and above the committee, with the right to select national convention delegates. This majority passed resolutions opposing the Covenant of the League of Nations as negotiated at Paris, rejecting a potential Wilson third term, advocating free speech, free press, local self-government, and repeal of all espionage, sedition, and conscription laws passed during the war. Furthermore, they elected William J. Vereen to succeed Clark Howell as Georgia's member of the Democratic National Committee.

The majority offered to split the delegation in three, which was refused by Palmer leaders. The majority then elected delegates to the national convention to vote only for a candidate favorable to the principles endorsed by the convention. After adjournment, Palmer supporters convened separately, electing a rival delegation pledged to Palmer, and reelecting Howell as national committeeman. The Credentials Committee of the national convention chose to seat the delegates pledged to Palmer.

Candidate	Popular vote		County unit vote	
Candidate	Votes	%	Votes	%
A. Mitchell Palmer	48,460	33.19	144	37.31
Thomas E. Watson	51,974	35.60	132	34.20
Hoke Smith	45,568	31.21	110	28.50
Total	146,002	100.00	386	100.00

== Results ==
1920 United States presidential election in Georgia
Party	Candidate	Votes	Percentage	Electoral votes
Democratic	James M. Cox	107,162	72.06%	14
Republican	Warren Harding	41,089	27.63%	0
Socialist	Eugene Debs	465 (Note: These Socialist votes were not separated by county and only given as a statewide total. They are included in the totals at the bottom of the county table.)	0.31%	0

=== Results by county ===
County	James Middleton Cox Democratic		Warren Gamaliel Harding Republican		Margin		Total votes cast
County	#	%	#	%	#	%	Total votes cast
Appling	313	61.49%	196	38.51%	117	22.99%	509
Atkinson	453	79.20%	119	20.80%	334	58.39%	572
Bacon	307	58.37%	219	41.63%	88	16.73%	526
Baker	141	63.80%	80	36.20%	61	27.60%	221
Baldwin	554	85.76%	92	14.24%	462	71.52%	646
Banks	479	58.34%	342	41.66%	137	16.69%	821
Barrow	731	63.95%	412	36.05%	319	27.91%	1,143
Bartow	922	55.01%	754	44.99%	168	10.02%	1,676
Ben Hill	543	70.06%	232	29.94%	311	40.13%	775
Berrien	623	91.48%	58	8.52%	565	82.97%	681
Bibb	2,030	81.59%	458	18.41%	1,572	63.18%	2,488
Bleckley	262	100.00%	0	0.00%	262	100.00%	262
Brooks	597	88.71%	76	11.29%	521	77.41%	673
Bryan	175	89.29%	21	10.71%	154	78.57%	196
Bulloch	1,098	81.58%	248	18.42%	850	63.15%	1,346
Burke	387	90.85%	39	9.15%	348	81.69%	426
Butts	502	78.07%	141	21.93%	361	56.14%	643
Calhoun	449	98.90%	5	1.10%	444	97.80%	454
Camden	152	91.57%	14	8.43%	138	83.13%	166
Campbell	263	71.08%	107	28.92%	156	42.16%	370
Candler	673	90.82%	68	9.18%	605	81.65%	741
Carroll	1,632	57.08%	1,227	42.92%	405	14.17%	2,859
Catoosa	55	62.50%	33	37.50%	22	25.00%	88
Charlton	157	84.86%	28	15.14%	129	69.73%	185
Chatham	4,243	81.00%	995	19.00%	3,248	62.01%	5,238
Chattahoochee	87	94.57%	5	5.43%	82	89.13%	92
Chattooga	887	63.31%	514	36.69%	373	26.62%	1,401
Cherokee	544	32.34%	1,138	67.66%	-594	-35.32%	1,682
Clarke	1,419	86.74%	217	13.26%	1,202	73.47%	1,636
Clay	230	78.50%	63	21.50%	167	57.00%	293
Clayton	475	93.32%	34	6.68%	441	86.64%	509
Clinch	294	79.25%	77	20.75%	217	58.49%	371
Cobb	1,208	52.45%	1,095	47.55%	113	4.91%	2,303
Coffee	426	64.94%	230	35.06%	196	29.88%	656
Colquitt	768	59.49%	523	40.51%	245	18.98%	1,291
Columbia	476	100.00%	0	0.00%	476	100.00%	476
Cook	260	46.18%	303	53.82%	-43	-7.64%	563
Coweta	1,094	86.62%	169	13.38%	925	73.24%	1,263
Crawford	235	78.33%	65	21.67%	170	56.67%	300
Crisp	565	87.19%	83	12.81%	482	74.38%	648
Dade	494	81.25%	114	18.75%	380	62.50%	608
Dawson	254	41.78%	354	58.22%	-100	-16.45%	608
Decatur	982	76.60%	300	23.40%	682	53.20%	1,282
DeKalb	1,847	69.70%	803	30.30%	1,044	39.40%	2,650
Dodge	627	77.99%	177	22.01%	450	55.97%	804
Dooly	544	93.31%	39	6.69%	505	86.62%	583
Dougherty	621	85.54%	105	14.46%	516	71.07%	726
Douglas	427	47.34%	475	52.66%	-48	-5.32%	902
Early	381	91.81%	34	8.19%	347	83.61%	415
Effingham	726	86.02%	118	13.98%	608	72.04%	844
Elbert	1,247	86.96%	187	13.04%	1,060	73.92%	1,434
Emanuel	1,444	88.37%	190	11.63%	1,254	76.74%	1,634
Evans	432	96.43%	16	3.57%	416	92.86%	448
Fannin	549	33.64%	1,083	66.36%	-534	-32.72%	1,632
Fayette	231	74.28%	80	25.72%	151	48.55%	311
Floyd	1,923	74.25%	667	25.75%	1,256	48.49%	2,590
Forsyth	813	52.32%	741	47.68%	72	4.63%	1,554
Franklin	889	66.54%	447	33.46%	442	33.08%	1,336
Fulton	6,635	66.54%	3,336	33.46%	3,299	33.09%	9,971
Gilmer	546	45.20%	662	54.80%	-116	-9.60%	1,208
Glascock	232	73.65%	83	26.35%	149	47.30%	315
Glynn	422	76.17%	132	23.83%	290	52.35%	554
Gordon	713	43.42%	929	56.58%	-216	-13.15%	1,642
Grady	887	79.27%	232	20.73%	655	58.53%	1,119
Greene	681	79.28%	178	20.72%	503	58.56%	859
Gwinnett	1,645	59.07%	1,140	40.93%	505	18.13%	2,785
Habersham	503	44.55%	626	55.45%	-123	-10.89%	1,129
Hall	1,475	63.39%	852	36.61%	623	26.77%	2,327
Hancock	498	90.38%	53	9.62%	445	80.76%	551
Haralson	438	28.33%	1,108	71.67%	-670	-43.34%	1,546
Harris	398	97.79%	9	2.21%	389	95.58%	407
Hart	694	68.24%	323	31.76%	371	36.48%	1,017
Heard	461	97.05%	14	2.95%	447	94.11%	475
Henry	608	100.00%	0	0.00%	608	100.00%	608
Houston	723	94.88%	39	5.12%	684	89.76%	762
Irwin	525	82.16%	114	17.84%	411	64.32%	639
Jackson	1,069	76.19%	334	23.81%	735	52.39%	1,403
Jasper	429	91.08%	42	8.92%	387	82.17%	471
Jeff Davis	260	46.18%	303	53.82%	-43	-7.64%	563
Jefferson	837	91.08%	82	8.92%	755	82.15%	919
Jenkins	331	87.11%	49	12.89%	282	74.21%	380
Johnson	306	80.53%	74	19.47%	232	61.05%	380
Jones	87	73.73%	31	26.27%	56	47.46%	118
Laurens	1,167	76.93%	350	23.07%	817	53.86%	1,517
Lee	251	92.96%	19	7.04%	232	85.93%	270
Liberty	303	63.39%	175	36.61%	128	26.78%	478
Lincoln	509	99.41%	3	0.59%	506	98.83%	512
Lowndes	1,308	85.60%	220	14.40%	1,088	71.20%	1,528
Lumpkin	155	43.06%	205	56.94%	-50	-13.89%	360
Macon	483	87.66%	68	12.34%	415	75.32%	551
Madison	693	71.15%	281	28.85%	412	42.30%	974
Marion	236	56.73%	180	43.27%	56	13.46%	416
McDuffie	382	77.80%	109	22.20%	273	55.60%	491
McIntosh	119	75.32%	39	24.68%	80	50.63%	158
Meriwether	1,059	85.06%	186	14.94%	873	70.12%	1,245
Miller	155	83.78%	30	16.22%	125	67.57%	185
Milton	278	54.62%	231	45.38%	47	9.23%	509
Mitchell	930	86.59%	144	13.41%	786	73.18%	1,074
Monroe	837	90.98%	83	9.02%	754	81.96%	920
Montgomery	169	53.31%	148	46.69%	21	6.62%	317
Morgan	450	71.88%	176	28.12%	274	43.77%	626
Murray	728	46.11%	851	53.89%	-123	-7.79%	1,579
Muscogee	1,372	93.14%	101	6.86%	1,271	86.29%	1,473
Newton	753	68.33%	349	31.67%	404	36.66%	1,102
Oconee	341	75.95%	108	24.05%	233	51.89%	449
Oglethorpe	844	95.26%	42	4.74%	802	90.52%	886
Paulding	340	26.28%	954	73.72%	-614	-47.45%	1,294
Pickens	437	34.49%	830	65.51%	-393	-31.02%	1,267
Pierce	407	76.94%	122	23.06%	285	53.88%	529
Pike	1,277	82.02%	280	17.98%	997	64.03%	1,557
Polk	658	39.59%	1,004	60.41%	-346	-20.82%	1,662
Pulaski	338	85.57%	57	14.43%	281	71.14%	395
Putnam	420	98.82%	5	1.18%	415	97.65%	425
Quitman	135	97.12%	4	2.88%	131	94.24%	139
Rabun	312	67.97%	147	32.03%	165	35.95%	459
Randolph	534	91.28%	51	8.72%	483	82.56%	585
Richmond	2,656	83.86%	511	16.14%	2,145	67.73%	3,167
Rockdale	488	70.83%	201	29.17%	287	41.65%	689
Schley	235	81.60%	53	18.40%	182	63.19%	288
Screven	639	71.08%	260	28.92%	379	42.16%	899
Spalding	830	82.10%	181	17.90%	649	64.19%	1,011
Stephens	415	62.22%	252	37.78%	163	24.44%	667
Stewart	344	91.73%	31	8.27%	313	83.47%	375
Sumter	1,076	78.43%	296	21.57%	780	56.85%	1,372
Talbot	379	89.81%	43	10.19%	336	79.62%	422
Taliaferro	330	96.49%	12	3.51%	318	92.98%	342
Tattnall	447	59.76%	301	40.24%	146	19.52%	748
Taylor	491	69.94%	211	30.06%	280	39.89%	702
Telfair	1,069	96.65%	37	3.35%	1,032	93.31%	1,106
Terrell	500	91.24%	48	8.76%	452	82.48%	548
Thomas	1,130	87.06%	168	12.94%	962	74.11%	1,298
Tift	576	78.90%	154	21.10%	422	57.81%	730
Toombs	397	61.74%	246	38.26%	151	23.48%	643
Towns	256	39.14%	398	60.86%	-142	-21.71%	654
Treutlen	263	71.08%	107	28.92%	156	42.16%	370
Troup	1,451	80.93%	342	19.07%	1,109	61.85%	1,793
Turner	393	68.35%	182	31.65%	211	36.70%	575
Twiggs	273	86.12%	44	13.88%	229	72.24%	317
Union	469	45.49%	562	54.51%	-93	-9.02%	1,031
Upson	957	84.92%	170	15.08%	787	69.83%	1,127
Walker	1,347	55.75%	1,069	44.25%	278	11.51%	2,416
Walton	1,189	90.63%	123	9.38%	1,066	81.25%	1,312
Ware	901	80.73%	215	19.27%	686	61.47%	1,116
Warren	402	82.89%	83	17.11%	319	65.77%	485
Washington	1,134	90.58%	118	9.42%	1,016	81.15%	1,252
Wayne	407	94.21%	25	5.79%	382	88.43%	432
Webster	185	88.52%	24	11.48%	161	77.03%	209
Wheeler	350	77.61%	101	22.39%	249	55.21%	451
White	209	44.19%	264	55.81%	-55	-11.63%	473
Whitfield	762	41.53%	1,073	58.47%	-311	-16.95%	1,835
Wilcox	481	81.94%	106	18.06%	375	63.88%	587
Wilkes	876	98.65%	12	1.35%	864	97.30%	888
Wilkinson	256	87.37%	37	12.63%	219	74.74%	293
Worth	626	74.52%	214	25.48%	412	49.05%	840
Echols (Note: No returns were canvassed for Echols County. Whatever voters existed in Echols County were listed in totals for neighboring counties.)	N/A	N/A	N/A	N/A	N/A	N/A	N/A
Totals	107,162	72.06%	41,089	27.63%	66,073	44.43%	148,716
