= Howard, Georgia =

- Unincorporated community Census-designated place
- Location within Georgia
- Coordinates: 32°35′46″N 84°23′04″W
- Country: United States
- State: Georgia
- County: Taylor

Area
  - Total: 2.91 sq mi (7.54 km^{2})
  - Land: 2.89 sq mi (7.49 km^{2})
  - Water: 0.019 sq mi (0.05 km^{2})
- Elevation: 584 ft (178 m)

Population (2020)
  - Total: 50
  - Density: 17.3/sq mi (6.67/km^{2})
- Time zone: UTC-5 (Eastern (EST))
  - Summer (DST): UTC-4 (EDT)
- ZIP code: 31039
- Area code: 478
- GNIS feature ID: 2587037

Howard is an unincorporated community and census-designated place (CDP) in Taylor County, Georgia, United States. Its population was 50 as of the 2020 census.

Howard has a post office with ZIP code 31039. Georgia State Route 96 passes through the community.

== Demographics ==
Historical population
| Census | Pop. | Note | %± |
|---|---|---|---|
| 2010 | 110 | | — |
| 2020 | 50 | | −54.5% |
U.S. Decennial Census; 1850-1870 1870-1880; 1890-1910 1920-1930; 1940 1950 1960; 1970 1980 1990; 2000 2010 2020

Howard was first listed as a census designated place in the 2010 census.

Howard CDP, Georgia – Racial and ethnic composition Note: the US Census treats Hispanic/Latino as an ethnic category. This table excludes Latinos from the racial categories and assigns them to a separate category. Hispanics/Latinos may be of any race.
| Race / Ethnicity (NH = Non-Hispanic) | Pop 2010 | Pop 2020 | % 2010 | % 2020 |
|---|---|---|---|---|
| White alone (NH) | 90 | 37 | 81.82% | 74.00% |
| Black or African American alone (NH) | 13 | 3 | 11.82% | 6.00% |
| Native American or Alaska Native alone (NH) | 1 | 0 | 0.91% | 0.00% |
| Asian alone (NH) | 0 | 2 | 0.00% | 4.00% |
| Pacific Islander alone (NH) | 0 | 0 | 0.00% | 0.00% |
| Some Other Race alone (NH) | 0 | 0 | 0.00% | 0.00% |
| Mixed Race or Multi-Racial (NH) | 0 | 1 | 0.00% | 2.00% |
| Hispanic or Latino (any race) | 6 | 7 | 5.45% | 14.00% |
| Total | 110 | 50 | 100.00% | 100.00% |
