= Talmadge Memorial Bridge =

Bridge in Savannah, Georgia, US

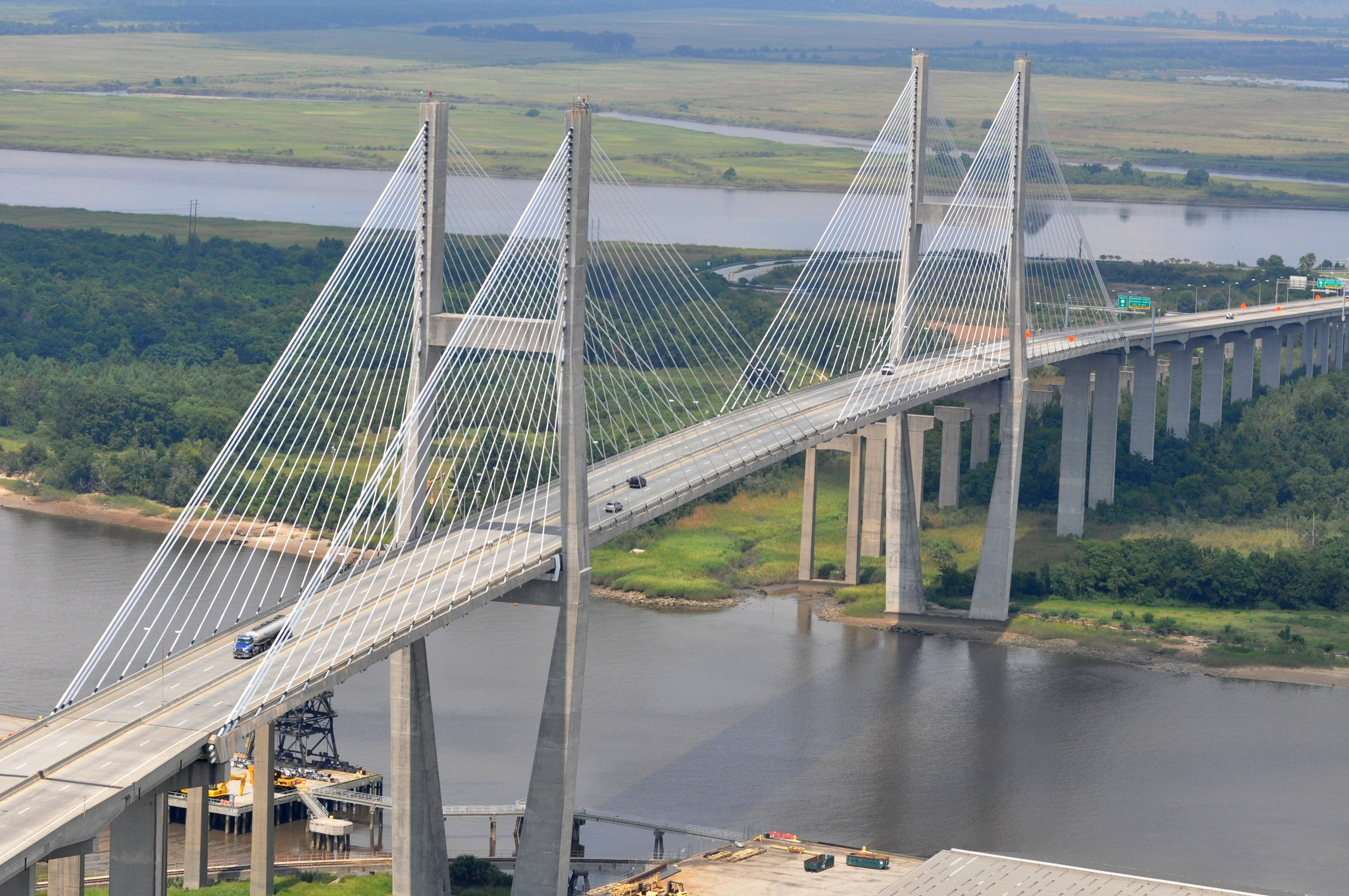
- Coordinates: 32°5′20.67″N 81°5′55.68″W
- Carries: US 17 / SR 404 Spur
- Crosses: Savannah River
- Locale: Savannah, Georgia
- Official name: Eugene Talmadge Memorial Bridge
- Other name: Savannah Bridge
- Maintained by: Georgia Department of Transportation

Characteristics
- Design: cable-stayed bridge
- Total length: 1.9 miles (3.06 km)
- Longest span: 1,100 feet (335 m)
- Clearance below: 185 feet

History
- Opened: November 1991

Location
- Interactive map of Talmadge Memorial Bridge

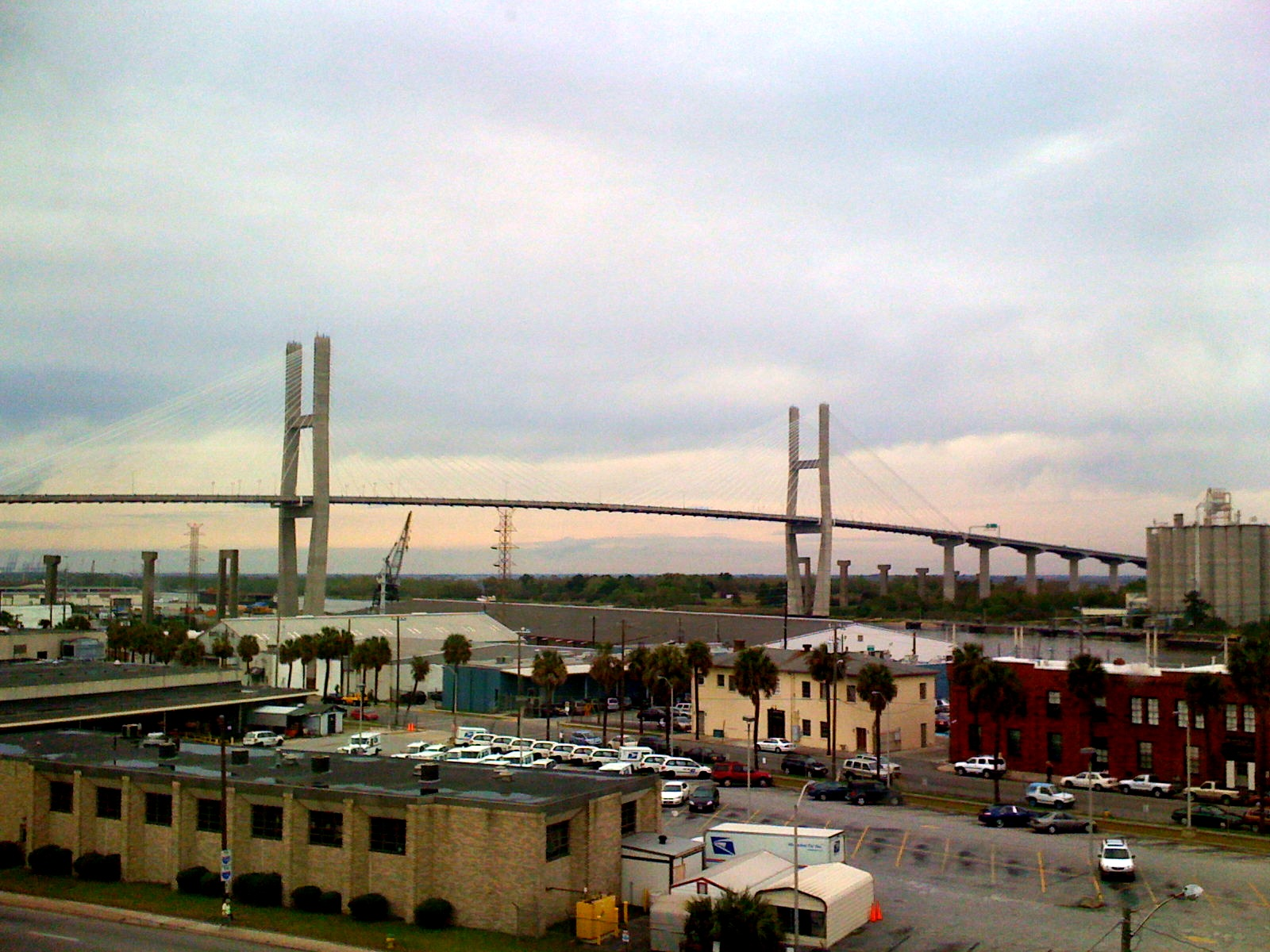

The Talmadge Memorial Bridge is a bridge in the United States spanning the Savannah River between downtown Savannah, Georgia, and Hutchinson Island. It carries US 17/SR 404 Spur. The original cantilever bridge was built in 1953; a replacement bridge was completed in 1991, and named the Talmadge Memorial Bridge.

== History ==
The original Talmadge bridge was a cantilever truss bridge built in 1953. By the 1980s, it had become functionally obsolete with only two lanes and no median and also became a danger for large ships entering the Port of Savannah, home to the largest single-ocean-container terminal on the U.S. eastern seaboard, and the nation's fourth-busiest seaport. Because of this, plans to replace the bridge began in the early 1980s. Construction on a four-lane-wide cable-stayed span began in 1987, and was completed in March 1991.

== Name ==
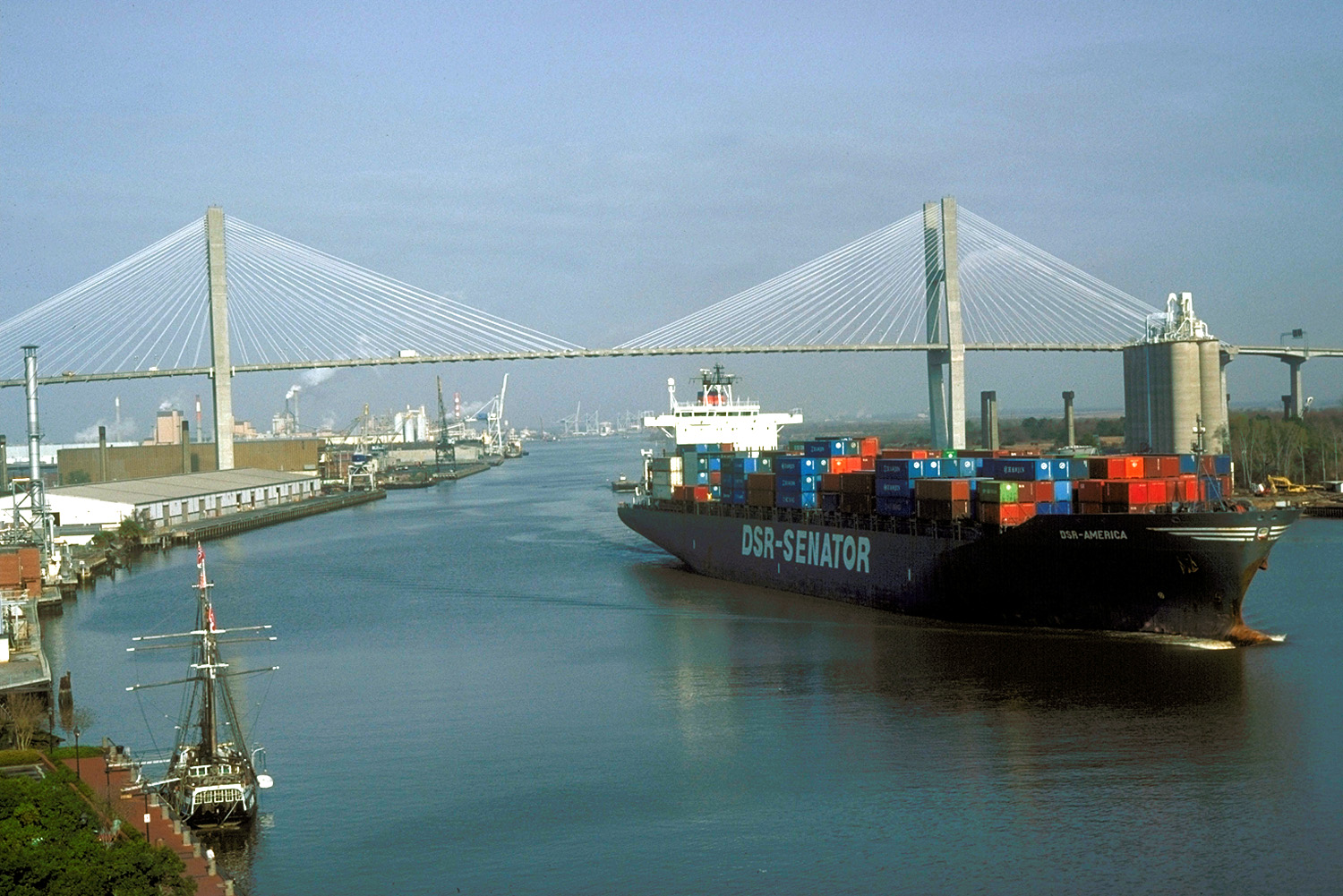
Shipping under the Talmadge Memorial Bridge. Piers (vertical supports) of the original 1953 bridge still stand and can be seen behind the new bridge structure.

The structure is dedicated to Eugene Talmadge, who served as the Democratic governor of Georgia in 1933-37 and 1941–43.

The replacement bridge was originally suggested to be named for the Native American Creek leader Tomochichi, an important figure in Savannah's founding in 1733. After public forums on the issue, the original name was restored for the new structure.

=== Proposals for renaming ===
Talmadge was an old-school conservative Southern Democrat, who pursued then-popular and openly racist objectives such as restoring the white primary and enforcing segregation of the state universities. He also struck out against opposing centers of power, using martial law to dismiss state boards that opposed his measures as well as arrest both strikers and strikebreakers alike, actions which led to him both being accused of being a dictator as well as being a friend of the "common man." Talmadge's legacy has caused some in Savannah to oppose letting him have the prominent honor of the bridge named for him, including Savannah's City Council. However, renaming the bridge is decided at the state level by the legislature, where there is considerably more sympathy for Talmadge.

In September 2017, Savannah City Council passed a resolution to rename the bridge the "Savannah Bridge". A state representative said, "It's time to move forward on a bridge that reminds us of segregation and not solidarity and a name that connects to hate and not hope." It is ultimately up to the Georgia state government to confirm the passed resolution. Another proposal, pushed by the Girl Scouts, is to rename the bridge after Juliette Gordon Low, a Savannah native who founded the Girl Scouts. One argument that the pro-renaming faction has raised is that the 1991 bridge may never have actually been formally named at all in the records, meaning it was never the Talmadge Memorial Bridge to begin with.

== Dimensions ==
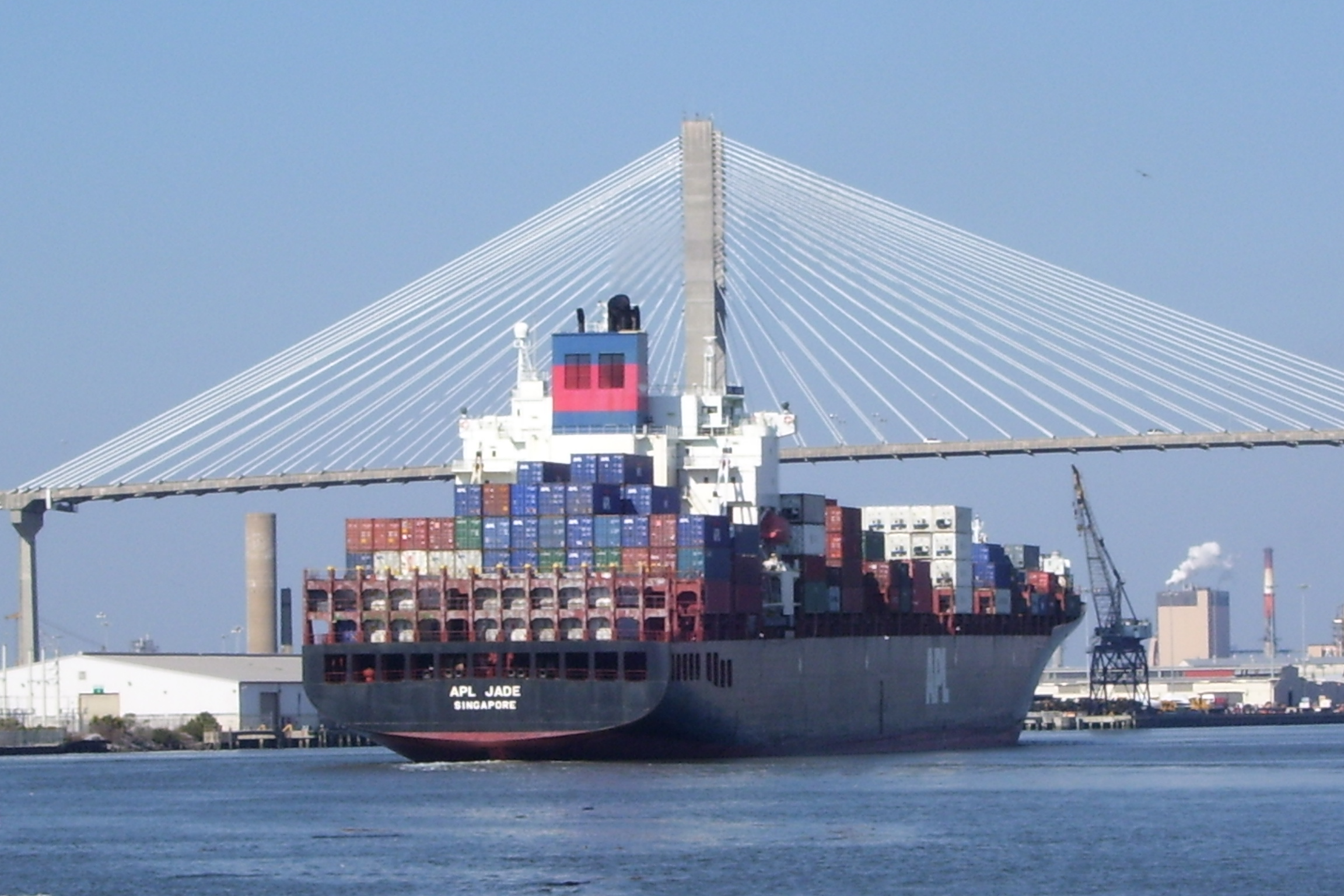
A ship pictured in front of the bridge.

The new bridge provides 185 feet (56 m) of vertical navigational clearance for oceangoing vessels. Its horizontal clearance is 1,023 feet (312 m), with both main piers located on the north and south banks of the Savannah River. With a main span of 1,100 feet (340 m) and a total length of 1.9 miles (3.1 km), the new Talmadge Memorial carries four lanes of traffic. The north end of the bridge ends on Hutchinson Island, an island situated between the Savannah River and the Back River. A separate, older, two-lane bridge spans Back River, connecting Hutchinson Island with Jasper County, South Carolina.

== Future replacement ==
Savannah is currently undergoing expansion, the Savannah Harbor Expansion Project (SHEP), so the port can accommodate newer, larger vessels. In September 2018, Savannah Now reported officials thought the Talmadge Bridge may need to be raised or replaced if the port was to service Neo-Panamax vessels. In October 2023, GDOT announced that it would raise the bridge and deepen and widen shipping lanes to accommodate larger ships. However, just two months later in December 2023, GDOT announced that although it will still be raised, the Talmadge Bridge would have eventually been replaced in its entirety because the structure would still not be tall enough to accommodate the next generation of cargo ships. GDOT did not indicate whether the bridge would be replaced with another bridge or a tunnel, but did note that replacing the bridge would likely cost upwards of $1 billion.
