= National Register of Historic Places listings in Wilkinson County, Georgia =

This is a list of properties and districts in Wilkinson County, Georgia that are listed on the National Register of Historic Places (NRHP).

This National Park Service list is complete through NPS recent listings posted March 14, 2025.

== Current listings ==
	Name on the Register	Image	Date listed	Location	City or town	Description
1	Elam-Camp House	Elam-Camp House	June 17, 1982 (#82002498)	216 Jackson St. (house shows 107 as of 2017); 32°53′00″N 83°20′12″W	Gordon	
