= Georgia State Route 358 =

State highway in Georgia, United States

State Route 358
- Homer Chance Highway
- SR 358 highlighted in red

Route information
- Maintained by GDOT
- Length: 6.4 mi (10.3 km)
- Existed: 1966–present

Major junctions
- West end: SR 96 south-southwest of Jeffersonville
- I-16 south-southeast of Jeffersonville
- East end: US 80 / SR 19 west of Danville

Location
- Country: United States
- State: Georgia
- County: Twiggs

Highway system
- Georgia State Highway System; Interstate; US; State; Special
← SR 357	→ SR 359

State Route 358 (SR 358) is a 6.4-mile-long (10.3 km) west–east state highway located entirely in the southeastern part of Twiggs County in the central part of the U.S. state of Georgia. It is mainly a rural route. The highway was built along its current alignment between 1963 and 1966.

== Route description ==
SR 358 begins at an intersection with SR 96 south-southeast of Jeffersonville. The route travels to the east-northeast along Homer Chance Highway to an interchange with Interstate 16 (I-16) just east of its midpoint. It continues to the east-northeast and meets its eastern terminus, an intersection with US 80/SR 19 west of Danville.

SR 358 is not part of the National Highway System, a system of roadways important to the nation's economy, defense, and mobility.

== History ==
SR 358 was built, and paved, along its current alignment between 1963 and 1966.

== Major intersections ==
The entire route is in Twiggs County.

Location	mi	km	Destinations	Notes
	0.0	0.0	SR 96 – Warner Robins, Jeffersonville	Western terminus
	3.6	5.8	I-16 (James Gillis Memorial Highway / SR 404) – Macon, Savannah	I-16 exit 27
	6.4	10.3	US 80 / SR 19 – Macon, Dublin	Eastern terminus
1.000 mi = 1.609 km; 1.000 km = 0.621 mi
