= Savage Creek (Rogue River tributary) =

Stream in Oregon, United States

Coordinates: 42°25′05″N 123°13′11″W

- Location within Oregon

Location
- Country: United States
- Location: Jackson County, Oregon

Physical characteristics
- Source
  - location: Siskiyou mountains
- Mouth
  - location: Rogue River (Oregon) rogue river
  - elevation: 978'
- Length: 4.5 miles

Basin features
- Tributaries
  - left: bee creek
  - right: cold springs creek

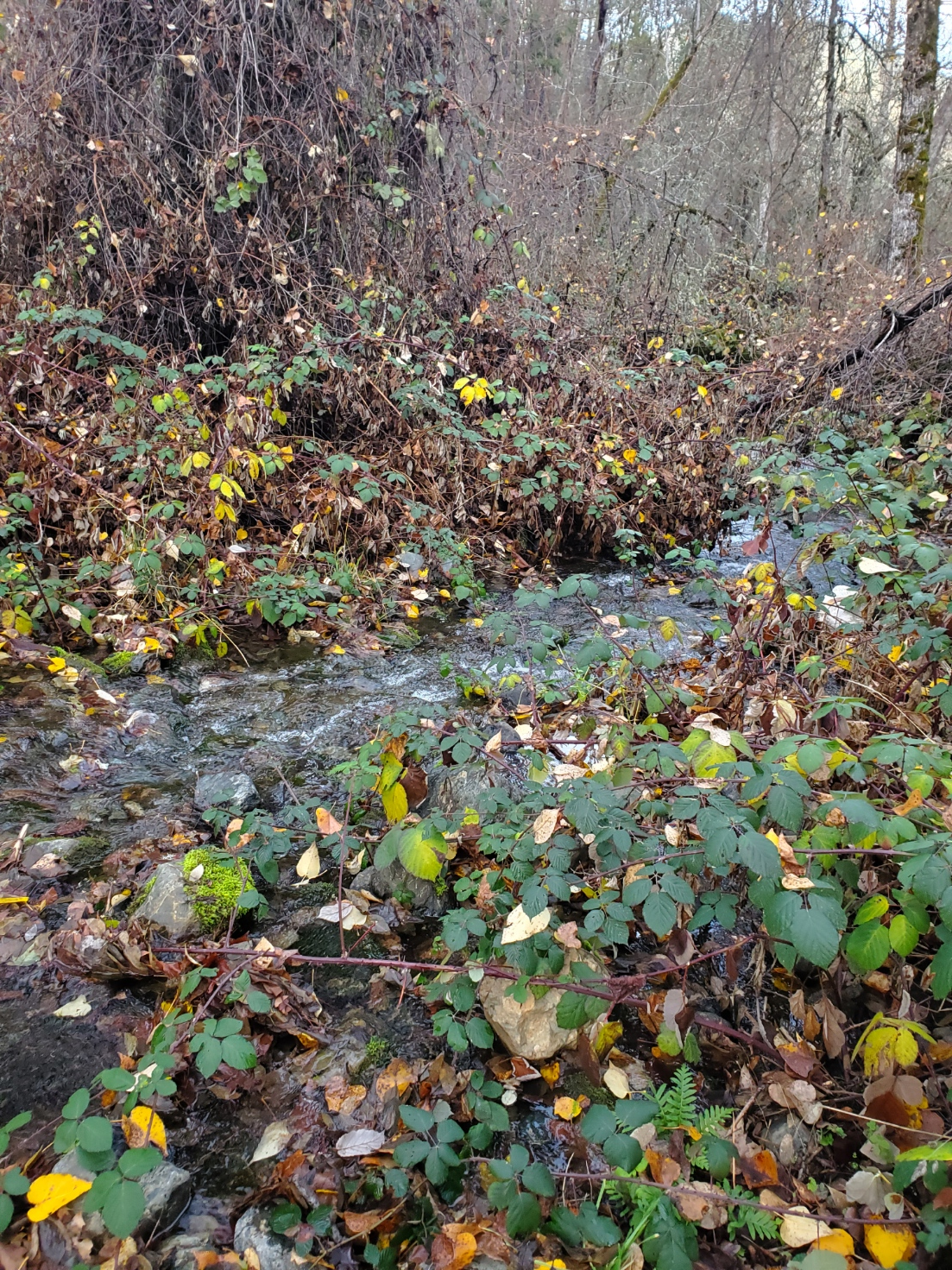
Savage creek roughly 1 mile upstream from its mouth

Savage Creek is a 4.5 mile long stream in the U.S. state of Oregon. It is a tributary to the Rogue River.

Savage Creek begins 4.5 miles from its mouth, high in the siskiyou mountains fed by rain run off. savage creek is an intermittent creek. Savage creek was named in 1853 after James Savage, a pioneer citizen.
