= Savage Creek (Tennessee) =

- Location within Tennessee Location within the United States

Physical characteristics
- Source
  - coordinates: 35.415°N 85.5027778°W
- Mouth
  - coordinates: 35.4553484°N 85.6233074°W

Savage Creek is a stream in the U.S. state of Tennessee. It is a tributary to the Collins River.

Savage Creek was named after Samuel Savage, a pioneer citizen.
