= McIntyre, Georgia =

- Town
- Location in Wilkinson County and the state of Georgia
- Coordinates: 32°50′50″N 83°12′7″W
- Country: United States
- State: Georgia
- County: Wilkinson

Area
  - Total: 5.37 sq mi (13.90 km^{2})
  - Land: 5.18 sq mi (13.42 km^{2})
  - Water: 0.19 sq mi (0.48 km^{2})
- Elevation: 259 ft (79 m)

Population (2020)
  - Total: 575
  - Density: 110.9/sq mi (42.83/km^{2})
- Time zone: UTC-5 (Eastern (EST))
  - Summer (DST): UTC-4 (EDT)
- ZIP code: 31054
- Area code: 478
- FIPS code: 13-48848
- GNIS feature ID: 0317929
- Website: www.mcintyrega.com

McIntyre is a town in Wilkinson County, Georgia, United States. The population was 575 in 2020.

== History ==
McIntyre was founded as a depot on the Central of Georgia Railway. The community was named after Thomas McIntyre, a railroad official. The Georgia General Assembly incorporated McIntyre as a town in 1910.

== Geography ==
McIntyre is located at 32°50′50″N 83°12′07″W. According to the United States Census Bureau, the town has a total area of 5.4 square miles (14 km^{2}), of which 5.2 square miles (13 km^{2}) is land and 0.2 square miles (0.52 km^{2}) (2.99%) is water.

== Demographics ==
Historical population
Census	Pop.	Note	%±
1930	170		—
1940	209		22.9%
1950	194		−7.2%
1960	316		62.9%
1970	471		49.1%
1980	386		−18.0%
1990	552		43.0%
2000	718		30.1%
2010	650		−9.5%
2020	575		−11.5%
U.S. Decennial Census; 1850-1870 1870-1880; 1890-1910 1920-1930; 1940 1950 1960; 1970 1980 1990; 2000 2010 2020

=== Racial and ethnic composition ===
McIntyre town, Georgia – Racial and ethnic composition Note: the US Census treats Hispanic/Latino as an ethnic category. This table excludes Latinos from the racial categories and assigns them to a separate category. Hispanics/Latinos may be of any race.
Race / Ethnicity (NH = Non-Hispanic)	Pop 2000	Pop 2010	Pop 2020	% 2000	% 2010	% 2020
White alone (NH)	261	187	135	36.35%	28.77%	23.48%
Black or African American alone (NH)	413	403	376	57.52%	62.00%	65.39%
Native American or Alaska Native alone (NH)	1	0	0	0.14%	0.00%	0.00%
Asian alone (NH)	0	0	0	0.00%	0.00%	0.00%
Native Hawaiian or Pacific Islander alone (NH)	0	0	0	0.00%	0.00%	0.00%
Other race alone (NH)	0	0	0	0.00%	0.00%	0.00%
Mixed race or Multiracial (NH)	5	6	18	0.70%	0.92%	3.13%
Hispanic or Latino (any race)	38	54	46	5.29%	8.31%	8.00%
Total	718	650	575	100.00%	100.00%	100.00%

=== 2000 census ===
As of the census of 2000, there were 718 people, 253 households, and 180 families residing in the town. By 2020, its population was 575.

== Notable people ==
- Kevin Brown, baseball pitcher
- Travis Jones, assistant defensive line coach for the Atlanta Falcons
- Shannon family, reality television personalities from the TLC show Here Comes Honey Boo Boo
