= Miami Valley, Georgia =

Unincorporated community in Peach County, Georgia, US

Coordinates: 32°33′14″N 83°47′48″W

Miami Valley is an unincorporated community in Peach County, in the U.S. state of Georgia.

== History ==
The community's name is derived from the Miami Indians.
