= Wilkinson County, Georgia =

County in Georgia, United States

- County
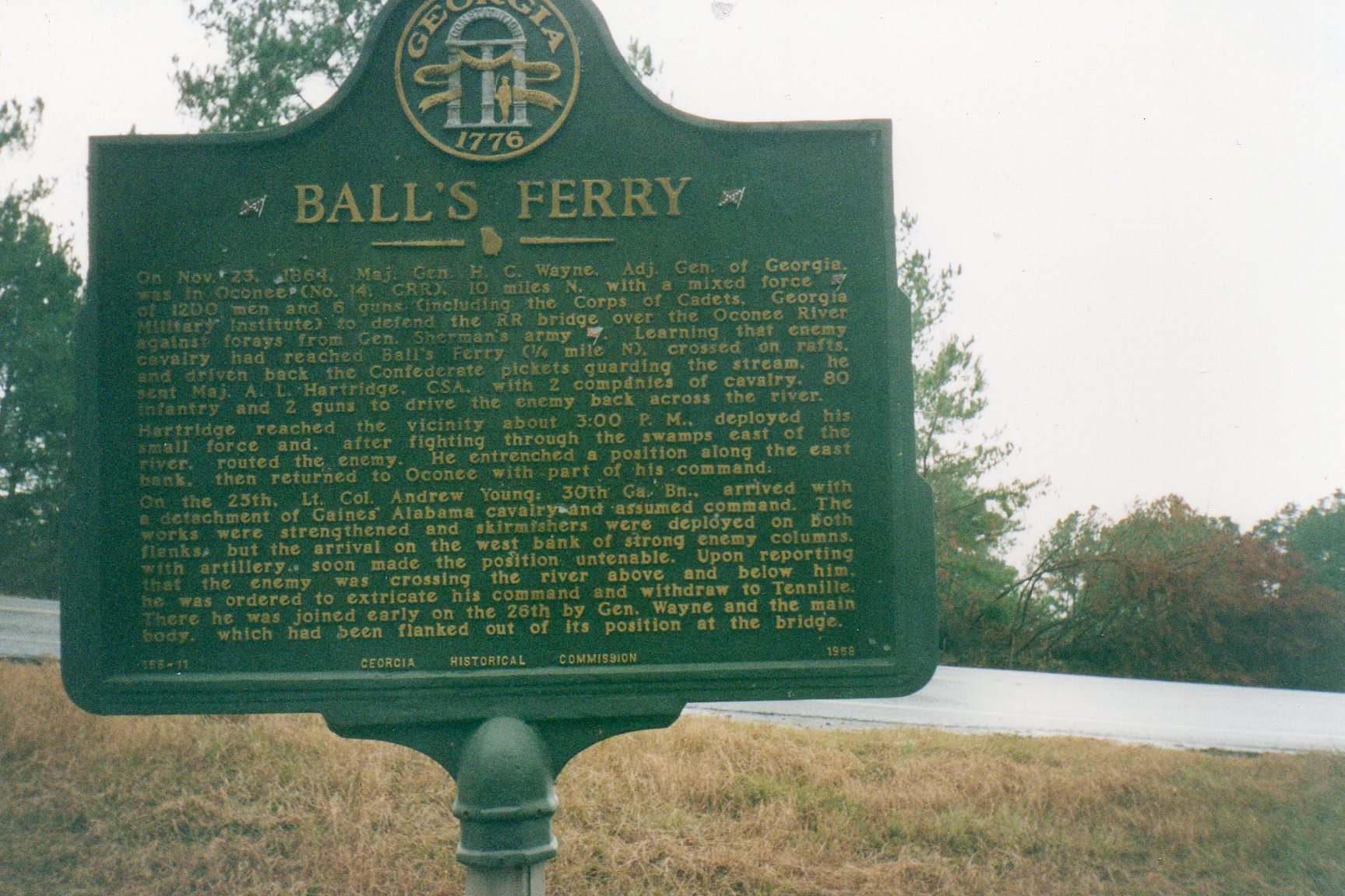
- Ball's Ferry Landing has been designated as a site on the March to the Sea Heritage Trail.

- Location within the U.S. state of Georgia
- Coordinates: 32.80°N 83.17°W
- Country: United States
- State: Georgia
- Founded: May 11, 1803; 223 years ago
- Named for: James Wilkinson
- Seat: Irwinton
- Largest city: Gordon

Area
  - Total: 452 sq mi (1,170 km^{2})
  - Land: 447 sq mi (1,160 km^{2})
  - Water: 4.6 sq mi (12 km^{2}) 1.0%

Population (2020)
  - Total: 8,877
  - Estimate (2025): 8,650 ▼
  - Density: 19.9/sq mi (7.67/km^{2})
- Time zone: UTC−5 (Eastern)
  - Summer (DST): UTC−4 (EDT)
- Congressional district: 8th
- Website: www.wilkinsoncounty.net

Wilkinson County is a county located in the central portion of the U.S. state of Georgia. As of the 2020 census, the population was 8,877. The county seat is Irwinton. The county was created on May 11, 1803, and named for General James Wilkinson (1757–1825).

== Geography ==
According to the U.S. Census Bureau, the county has a total area of 452 square miles (1,170 km^{2}), of which 447 square miles (1,160 km^{2}) is land and 4.6 square miles (12 km^{2}) (1.0%) is water. The county is located mainly in the upper Atlantic coastal plain region of the state, but does have some rolling hills due to its close proximity to the fall line.

The entirety of Wilkinson County is located in the Lower Oconee River sub-basin of the Altamaha River basin.

=== Major highways ===
- U.S. Route 80 / State Route 19
- U.S. Route 441 / State Route 29
- State Route 18
  - State Route 18 Spur
- State Route 57
- State Route 96
- State Route 112
- State Route 243
- State Route 540 (Fall Line Freeway)

=== Adjacent counties ===
- Baldwin County (north)
- Bleckley County (south)
- Washington County (northeast)
- Johnson County (east)
- Laurens County (southeast)
- Twiggs County (southwest)
- Jones County (northwest)

== Communities ==
=== Cities ===
- Allentown
- Gordon
- Irwinton (county seat)
- Danville
- Ivey
- McIntyre
- Toomsboro

=== Unincorporated communities ===
- Nicklesville
- Stephensville

== Demographics ==
Historical population
Census	Pop.	Note	%±
1810	2,154		—
1820	6,992		224.6%
1830	6,513		−6.9%
1840	6,842		5.1%
1850	8,296		21.3%
1860	9,376		13.0%
1870	9,383		0.1%
1880	12,061		28.5%
1890	10,871		−9.9%
1900	11,440		5.2%
1910	10,078		−11.9%
1920	11,376		12.9%
1930	10,844		−4.7%
1940	11,025		1.7%
1950	9,781		−11.3%
1960	9,250		−5.4%
1970	9,393		1.5%
1980	10,368		10.4%
1990	10,228		−1.4%
2000	10,220		−0.1%
2010	9,563		−6.4%
2020	8,877		−7.2%
2025 (est.)	8,650	▼	−2.6%
U.S. Decennial Census; 1790-1880 1890-1910; 1920-1930 1930-1940; 1940-1950 1960-1980; 1980-2000 2010 2020

=== Racial and ethnic composition ===
Wilkinson County, Georgia – Racial and ethnic composition Note: the US Census treats Hispanic/Latino as an ethnic category. This table excludes Latinos from the racial categories and assigns them to a separate category. Hispanics/Latinos may be of any race.
Race / Ethnicity (NH = Non-Hispanic)	Pop 1980	Pop 1990	Pop 2000	Pop 2010	Pop 2020	% 1980	% 1990	% 2000	% 2010	% 2020
White alone (NH)	5,679	5,886	5,893	5,529	5,110	54.77%	57.55%	57.66%	57.82%	57.56%
Black or African American alone (NH)	4,584	4,300	4,153	3,664	3,163	44.21%	42.04%	40.64%	38.31%	35.63%
Native American or Alaska Native alone (NH)	3	5	20	20	30	0.03%	0.05%	0.20%	0.21%	0.34%
Asian alone (NH)	2	6	7	31	22	0.02%	0.06%	0.07%	0.32%	0.25%
Native Hawaiian or Pacific Islander alone (NH)	x	x	0	1	3	x	x	0.00%	0.01%	0.03%
Other race alone (NH)	1	1	2	14	13	0.01%	0.01%	0.02%	0.15%	0.15%
Mixed race or Multiracial (NH)	x	x	44	90	297	x	x	0.43%	0.94%	3.35%
Hispanic or Latino (any race)	99	30	101	214	239	0.95%	0.29%	0.99%	2.24%	2.69%
Total	10,368	10,228	10,220	9,563	8,877	100.00%	100.00%	100.00%	100.00%	100.00%

=== 2020 census ===
As of the 2020 census, the county had a population of 8,877. The median age was 44.9 years. 20.9% of residents were under the age of 18 and 20.4% of residents were 65 years of age or older. For every 100 females there were 94.4 males, and for every 100 females age 18 and over there were 91.4 males age 18 and over. 0.0% of residents lived in urban areas, while 100.0% lived in rural areas.

The racial makeup of the county was 58.2% White, 35.8% Black or African American, 0.3% American Indian and Alaska Native, 0.3% Asian, 0.1% Native Hawaiian and Pacific Islander, 1.3% from some other race, and 4.0% from two or more races. Hispanic or Latino residents of any race comprised 2.7% of the population.

There were 3,588 households and 2,079 families in the county, of which 29.0% had children under the age of 18 living with them and 31.6% had a female householder with no spouse or partner present. About 28.0% of all households were made up of individuals and 13.7% had someone living alone who was 65 years of age or older.

There were 4,288 housing units, of which 16.3% were vacant. Among occupied housing units, 76.7% were owner-occupied and 23.3% were renter-occupied. The homeowner vacancy rate was 1.1% and the rental vacancy rate was 7.8%.

== Politics ==
Wilkinson County voted for every Democratic presidential nominee from 1828 to 1960; note that 1828 was the first year in which Georgia held a popular vote for presidential electors and also the first year in which the Democratic Party ran a presidential candidate. However, there was at least one example of Republican success in the county during Reconstruction: in the 1868 gubernatorial election, which was held in April, the Republican ticket swept the county, with Rufus Bullock receiving 59% of the vote; the Republican candidate for county ordinary won by just 1.7%. Decades later, in the 1948 presidential election Harry Truman only won the county by one vote from States’ Rights candidate Strom Thurmond.

In 1964, Wilkinson County voted overwhelmingly for Barry Goldwater, the first Republican presidential nominee to win the county. It also delivered large victories to segregationist American Independent Party candidate George Wallace and Republican Richard Nixon in 1968 and 1972 respectively. In the presidential elections of both 1976 and 1980, former Georgia governor Jimmy Carter, a Democrat, won the county easily.

In 1984, Democrat Walter Mondale won the county by a 9% margin, which was only the second presidential result in the county within 30% since 1912. This was also the first time since 1848, when Whig Zachary Taylor narrowly won Georgia, that the county voted for a presidential candidate who did not win the state. In the following three presidential elections, Wilkinson continued to give Democratic candidates between 53% and 59% of the vote.

In 2000, Al Gore won Wilkinson County by a margin of 1.3%, or 84 votes, receiving 50.4% to George W. Bush's 48.1%. The county then voted for all three Republican nominees from 2004 to 2012, each time by a margin of less than 1.5%. In 2016, it voted for Donald Trump by a margin of just over 10%. Wilkinson was thus one of many counties in Georgia's historic black belt that demonstrated a significant swing in favor of Republican presidential candidates from 2012 to 2016. Similarly, the county swung from a 0.25% victory for the 2014 Democratic gubernatorial nominee to an 11.63% victory for the 2018 Republican gubernatorial nominee.

Even as it has become more favorable to Republicans at the state and federal level, Wilkinson's county government continued to be dominated by Democrats up until the 2020s. For most of this century the Democratic primary was often tantamount to election. In 2016, Democrats won all six county executive offices without Republican opposition, as well as the three school board seats up for election that year. While the Republican district attorney for the district that includes Wilkinson was also unopposed, he received only 65.6% of ballots cast, compared to at least 72.4% for each unopposed Democratic countywide official. In 2018, Democratic incumbents were reelected unopposed to two of the county's five commission seats unopposed and to a third seat by a 25% margin, as well as winning the race for commission chair unopposed. The Democratic candidate in the open first commission district lost, but by just 2.7%. Both school board members up that year were unopposed Democratic incumbents.

Similarly, the overwhelming majority of primary voters in Wilkinson have chosen Democratic ballots even in recent years, presidential primaries excepted. In 2014, 2,022 of 2,174 primary voters (93.0%) chose Democratic ballots. In 2016, 1,726 of 2,033 primary voters (84.9%) did so, and in 2018, 1,186 of the 1,862 primary voters (63.7%) did so, even in the context of a competitive statewide Republican primary for governor. Three incumbent county commissioners faced opponents in their 2018 primaries; the incumbent county commission chair lost, and the District 2 incumbent won by just one vote.

Prior to the November 2022 elections, Democrats held a majority or 4 out of 5 seats on the County Commission. On election night, a Republican defeated the incumbent Democratic chairman by nearly 20 percentage points. Republicans were also able to flip an additional seat on the commission previously held by a Democrat, and in doing so captured a 3–2 majority. Republicans also captured a seat on the local Board of Education, in which they had none prior to the election.

=== Representation ===
For elections to the United States House of Representatives, Wilkinson County is part of Georgia's 8th congressional district, currently represented by Austin Scott. For elections to the Georgia State Senate, Wilkinson County is part of District 26. For elections to the Georgia House of Representatives, Wilkinson County is part of District 133.

United States presidential election results for Wilkinson County, Georgia
Year	Republican		Democratic		Third party(ies)	
Year	No.	%	No.	%	No.	%
1912	10	2.58%	365	94.32%	12	3.10%
1916	20	4.77%	371	88.54%	28	6.68%
1920	37	12.63%	256	87.37%	0	0.00%
1924	56	15.86%	284	80.45%	13	3.68%
1928	227	31.79%	487	68.21%	0	0.00%
1932	0	0.00%	726	100.00%	0	0.00%
1936	118	14.43%	695	84.96%	5	0.61%
1940	147	13.95%	906	85.96%	1	0.09%
1944	271	26.21%	763	73.79%	0	0.00%
1948	96	8.74%	501	45.59%	502	45.68%
1952	378	18.83%	1,629	81.17%	0	0.00%
1956	393	23.23%	1,299	76.77%	0	0.00%
1960	631	32.28%	1,324	67.72%	0	0.00%
1964	2,172	69.28%	963	30.72%	0	0.00%
1968	685	20.24%	829	24.50%	1,870	55.26%
1972	2,196	74.52%	751	25.48%	0	0.00%
1976	837	23.99%	2,652	76.01%	0	0.00%
1980	1,116	31.60%	2,365	66.96%	51	1.44%
1984	1,756	45.52%	2,102	54.48%	0	0.00%
1988	1,546	45.30%	1,831	53.65%	36	1.05%
1992	1,232	30.26%	2,286	56.14%	554	13.61%
1996	1,332	34.08%	2,278	58.28%	299	7.65%
2000	1,800	48.13%	1,884	50.37%	56	1.50%
2004	2,261	50.04%	2,235	49.47%	22	0.49%
2008	2,349	50.21%	2,298	49.12%	31	0.66%
2012	2,246	50.40%	2,181	48.95%	29	0.65%
2016	2,333	54.29%	1,894	44.08%	70	1.63%
2020	2,665	55.87%	2,074	43.48%	31	0.65%
2024	2,888	58.84%	2,012	40.99%	8	0.16%

United States Senate election results for Wilkinson County, Georgia2
Year	Republican		Democratic		Third party(ies)	
Year	No.	%	No.	%	No.	%
2020	2,608	55.44%	2,017	42.88%	79	1.68%
2020	2,580	52.36%	2,347	47.64%	0	0.00%

United States Senate election results for Wilkinson County, Georgia3
Year	Republican		Democratic		Third party(ies)	
Year	No.	%	No.	%	No.	%
2020	1,407	29.99%	1,539	32.80%	1,746	37.21%
2020	2,664	56.21%	2,075	43.79%	0	0.00%
2022	2,272	56.20%	1,728	42.74%	43	1.06%
2022	2,105	55.64%	1,678	44.36%	0	0.00%

Georgia Gubernatorial election results for Wilkinson County
Year	Republican		Democratic		Third party(ies)	
Year	No.	%	No.	%	No.	%
2022	2,366	58.33%	1,673	41.25%	17	0.42%

=== Government ===
Current county officials:

Category	Specific office	Name	Party	Year of last election
Executive or judicial office	Clerk of Superior Court	Cinda Sloan Bright	D	2020
Executive or judicial office	Coroner	William “Billy” Matthews	R	2020
Executive or judicial office	Probate/Magistrate Judge	Sarah "Amanda" Holder	R	2025
Executive or judicial office	Sheriff	Richard Chatman	D	2020
Executive or judicial office	County Surveyor	Donald D. Brooks	D	2020
Executive or judicial office	Tax Commissioner	Jemesha Anderson	D	
Board of Commissioners	Chairman	Anthony Bentley	R	2024 Special
Board of Commissioners	District 1	Zachery Shepherd	R	2022
Board of Commissioners	District 2	James Hagins	D	2022
Board of Commissioners	District 3	Robert Dames	R	2022
Board of Commissioners	District 4	Anderson Ford	D	2022
Board of Education	Chairman	Roger Smith	D	2020
Board of Education	District 1	Leigh Scott	R	2022
Board of Education	District 2	Kimberly S. Watkins	D	2022
Board of Education	District 3	Leroy Strange	D	2020
Board of Education	District 4	Charles Pitts	D	2020

== Education ==
The only school district is the Wilkinson County School District.

== See also ==
- National Register of Historic Places listings in Wilkinson County, Georgia
- List of counties in Georgia
