= Danville, Georgia =

- Town
- Location in Twiggs County and the state of Georgia
- Coordinates: 32°36′20″N 83°14′41″W
- Country: United States
- State: Georgia
- Counties: Twiggs, Wilkinson

Area
  - Total: 0.79 sq mi (2.04 km^{2})
  - Land: 0.79 sq mi (2.04 km^{2})
  - Water: 0 sq mi (0.00 km^{2})
- Elevation: 449 ft (137 m)

Population (2020)
  - Total: 165
  - Density: 209.1/sq mi (80.74/km^{2})
- Time zone: UTC-5 (Eastern (EST))
  - Summer (DST): UTC-4 (EDT)
- ZIP code: 31017
- Area code: 478
- FIPS code: 13-21688
- GNIS feature ID: 0355443
- Website: cityofdanvillega.com

Danville is a town in Twiggs and Wilkinson counties in the U.S. state of Georgia. As of the 2020 census, Danville had a population of 165.

The Twiggs County portion of Danville is part of the Macon metropolitan statistical area.

== History ==
Danville was originally called "Hughes", and under that name had its start about 1891 when the railroad was extended to that point. The Georgia General Assembly incorporated the place in 1905 as the "Town of Danville". The town was named for Daniel G. Hughes, father of U.S. Representative Dudley Mays Hughes.

== Geography ==
Danville is located at 32°36′20″N 83°14′41″W (32.605607, -83.244762).

Interstate 16 runs northwest to southeast just south of town, leading southeast 137 mi (220 km) to Savannah and northwest 31 mi (50 km) to Macon. The town is also traversed by U.S. Route 80 and Georgia State Route 358.

According to the United States Census Bureau, the town has a total area of 0.8 square miles (2.1 km^{2}), all land.

== Demographics ==
Historical population
Census	Pop.	Note	%±
1910	299		—
1920	436		45.8%
1930	419		−3.9%
1940	423		1.0%
1950	461		9.0%
1960	264		−42.7%
1970	515		95.1%
1980	529		2.7%
1990	480		−9.3%
2000	373		−22.3%
2010	238		−36.2%
2020	165		−30.7%
U.S. Decennial Census; 1850-1870 1870-1880; 1890-1910 1920-1930; 1940 1950 1960; 1970 1980 1990; 2000 2010 2020

=== Racial and ethnic composition ===
Danville town, Georgia – Racial and ethnic composition Note: the US Census treats Hispanic/Latino as an ethnic category. This table excludes Latinos from the racial categories and assigns them to a separate category. Hispanics/Latinos may be of any race.
Race / Ethnicity (NH = Non-Hispanic)	Pop 2000	Pop 2010	Pop 2020	% 2000	% 2010	% 2020
White alone (NH)	177	139	87	47.45%	58.40%	52.73%
Black or African American alone (NH)	191	93	67	51.21%	39.08%	40.61%
Native American or Alaska Native alone (NH)	3	0	0	0.80%	0.00%	0.00%
Asian alone (NH)	0	0	0	0.00%	0.00%	0.00%
Native Hawaiian or Pacific Islander alone (NH)	0	0	0	0.00%	0.00%	0.00%
Other race alone (NH)	0	0	0	0.00%	0.00%	0.00%
Mixed race or Multiracial (NH)	2	0	7	0.54%	0.00%	4.24%
Hispanic or Latino (any race)	0	6	4	0.00%	2.52%	2.42%
Total	373	238	165	100.00%	100.00%	100.00%

As of 2023, of the 238 people in Danville, 209 lived in Twiggs County and 29 lived in Wilkinson County.

== Education ==
Residents of Twiggs County are in the Twiggs County School District.

Residents of Wilkinson County are in the Wilkinson County School District.
