= Savage Creek (Ocmulgee River tributary) =

Stream in Georgia, U.S.

Coordinates: 32°31′31.53″N 83°32′2.66″W

Savage Creek is a stream in the U.S. state of Georgia. It is a tributary to the Ocmulgee River.

Savage Creek received its name from an incident when white settlers were killed in a massacre perpetuated by Native Americans, pejoratively known as "savages".
