= Turkey Creek (Oconee River tributary) =

Stream in Georgia, U.S.

Turkey Creek is a stream in the U.S. state of Georgia. It is a tributary to the Oconee River. The stream headwaters arise just west of Jeffersonville at 32°41′19″N 83°21′27″W at an elevation of 480 feet. The stream flows southeast to enter the Oconee at Turkey Creek Landing approximately six miles southeast of Dublin at 32°25′35″N 82°49′45″W and an elevation of 150 feet.

Turkey Creek's name is an accurate preservation of its native Creek-language name, Pennohatchee meaning "turkey stream". Former variant names were "Pennohatchee Creek" and "Pinahachi Creek".
