= Georgia State Route 233 =

State highway in Georgia

State Route 233
- SR 233 highlighted in red

Route information
- Maintained by GDOT
- Length: 19.4 mi (31.2 km)
- Existed: 1944–present

Major junctions
- South end: SR 90 northeast of Rebecca
- SR 112 south of Rochelle; US 280 / SR 30 / SR 215 in Rochelle; SR 112 north of Rochelle
- North end: US 129 / SR 11 south-southeast of Pineview

Location
- Country: United States
- State: Georgia
- Counties: Ben Hill, Wilcox

Highway system
- Georgia State Highway System; Interstate; US; State; Special
← SR 232	→ SR 234

State Route 233 (SR 233) is a 19.4-mile-long (31.2 km) north–south state highway in the central part of the U.S. state of Georgia. It travels through portions of Ben Hill and Wilcox counties.

== Route description ==
SR 233 begins at an intersection with SR 90 (Salem Church Road), northeast of Rebecca in northwestern Ben Hill County. About 1.2 miles (1.9 km), it crosses into Wilcox County. A short distance later, it intersects Reeves Farm Road (Wilcox County Road 124), J.D. Fitzgerald Road (Wilcox CR 119), and J.B. McWorther Road (Wilcox CR 60) in rapid succession, before it intersects Owensboro Road, which leads to Abbeville. Shortly after is Taylor Road (Wilcox CR 128) and Smitty Road (Wilcox CR 68). Just after this, the route begins heading northwest, intersecting Hudson Road (Wilcox CR 131), Nelson Keene Road (Wilcox CR 115), Crawford Road (Wilcox CR 61), and later, County Farm Road (Wilcox CR 62)/East County Farm Road. Just before entering Rochelle, SR 233 intersects SR 112; they share a concurrency through the city. In Rochelle, the two routes pass local roads that provide access to Wilcox Elementary School and Donnie Clack Stadium. In downtown, they intersect SR 215 (5th Avenue). The three highways share a very brief concurrency in town. About 5 blocks later, they intersect US 280/SR 30 (1st Avenue), where SR 215 departs to the west. SR 112/SR 233 depart Rochelle to the north, passing Hawkins Road (Wilcox CR 26) before splitting. To the northeast, it intersects Brown Water Road (Wilcox CR 7), Bruce Road (Wilcox CR 36), Hackett Road (Wilcox CR 50), Barker Road (Wilcox CR 49), McDuffie Road (Wilcox CR 48), all in rapid succession. Then, it passes Helms Road (Wilcox CR 9), Matthews Road (Wilcox CR 10), McGlamry Road (Wilcox CR 302), before reaching Cannonsville Road (Wilcox CR 253, which leads to Abbeville and Pineview). Farther to the northeast is Dix Road (Wilcox CR 218) and Jean Arthur Road (Wilcox CR 216), and then Connor Road (Wilcox CR 33), before reaching its northern terminus, an intersection with US 129/SR 11 in the northeastern part of Wilcox County.

No section of SR 223 is part of the National Highway System, a system of routes determined to be the most important for the nation's economy, mobility and defense.

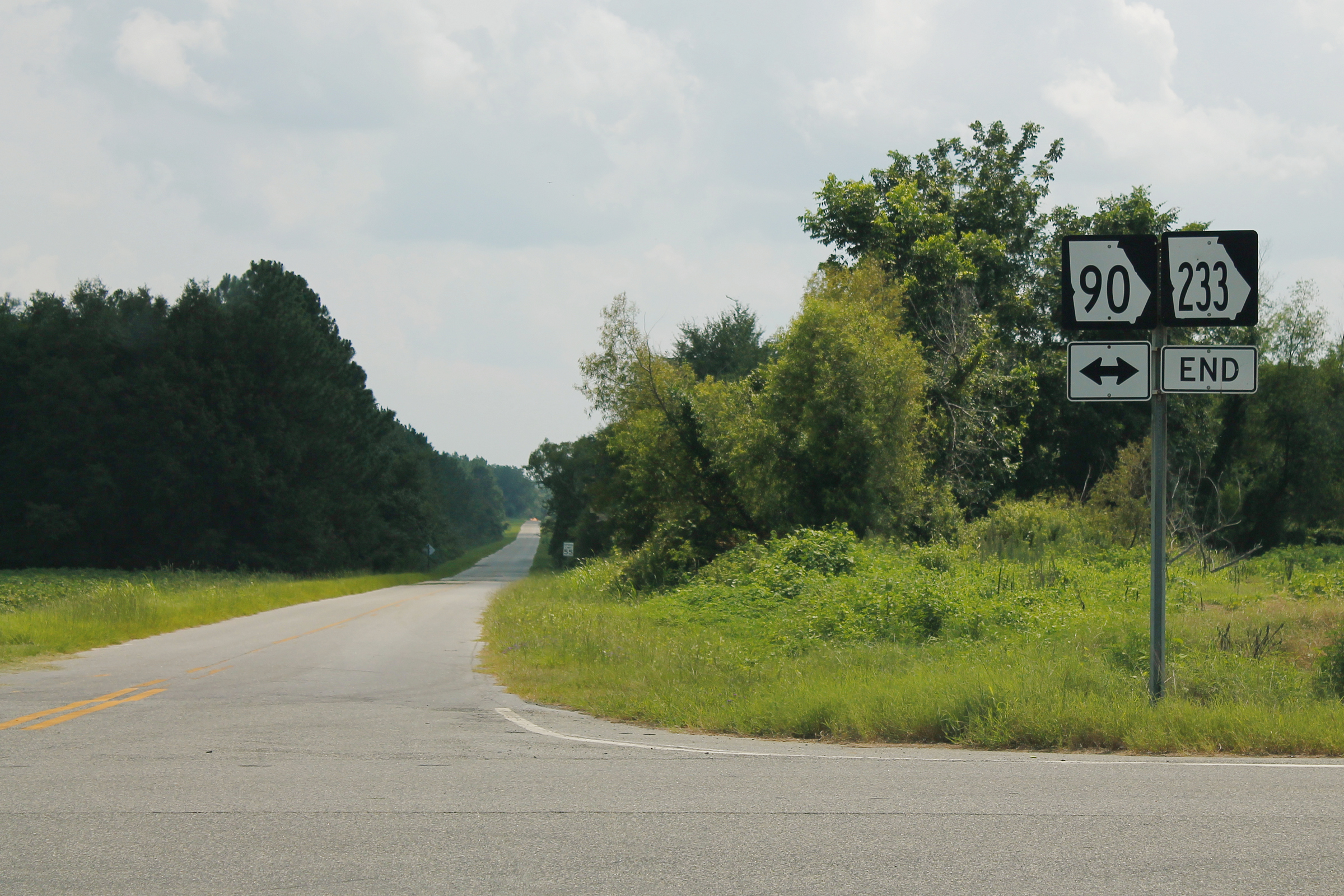
Southern terminus of SR 233 with SR 90 in Ben Hill County.

== History ==
The 1944 GDOT map showed that SR 233 was established in 1944 along the same alignment as it runs today, with the portion concurrent with SR 112 being paved. However, the 1946 GDOT map showed that the paved section was only the section from an undetermined point in Rochelle to the northern intersection with SR 112. By 1952, a short section just south of Rochelle was paved. By 1961, the road was paved from its southern terminus to its northern intersection with SR 112. By 1964, the road was paved the rest of its length.

== Major intersections ==
County	Location	mi	km	Destinations	Notes
Ben Hill		0.0	0.0	SR 90 (Salem Church Road) – Rebecca, Fitzgerald	Southern terminus
Wilcox		7.8	12.6	SR 112 south – Rebecca	Southern end of SR 112 concurrency
Wilcox	Rochelle	8.4	13.5	SR 215 east (5th Avenue) – Fitzgerald	Southern end of SR 215 concurrency
Wilcox	Rochelle	8.8	14.2	US 280 / SR 30 / SR 215 west (1st Avenue) – Cordele, Abbeville	Northern end of SR 215 concurrency
Wilcox		10.5	16.9	SR 112 north – Pineview	Northern end of SR 112 concurrency
Wilcox		19.4	31.2	US 129 / SR 11 – Abbeville, Hawkinsville	Northern terminus
1.000 mi = 1.609 km; 1.000 km = 0.621 mi: Concurrency terminus
