= Georgia State Route 215 =

State highway in Georgia, United States

State Route 215
- Georgia State Route 215 highlighted in red

Route information
- Maintained by GDOT
- Length: 38.6 mi (62.1 km)

Major junctions
- West end: SR 27 in Vienna
- I-75 in Vienna; US 280 / SR 30 in Pitts; US 280 / SR 30 / SR 112 / SR 233 in Rochelle
- East end: SR 90 northwest of Fitzgerald

Location
- Country: United States
- State: Georgia
- Counties: Dooly, Wilcox, Ben Hill

Highway system
- Georgia State Highway System; Interstate; US; State; Special
| ← SR 214 | → SR 216 |

State Route 215 (SR 215) is a 38.6-mile-long (62.1 km) state highway that runs northwest-to-southeast through portions of Dooly, Wilcox, and Ben Hill counties in the central part of the U.S. state of Georgia.

== Route description ==
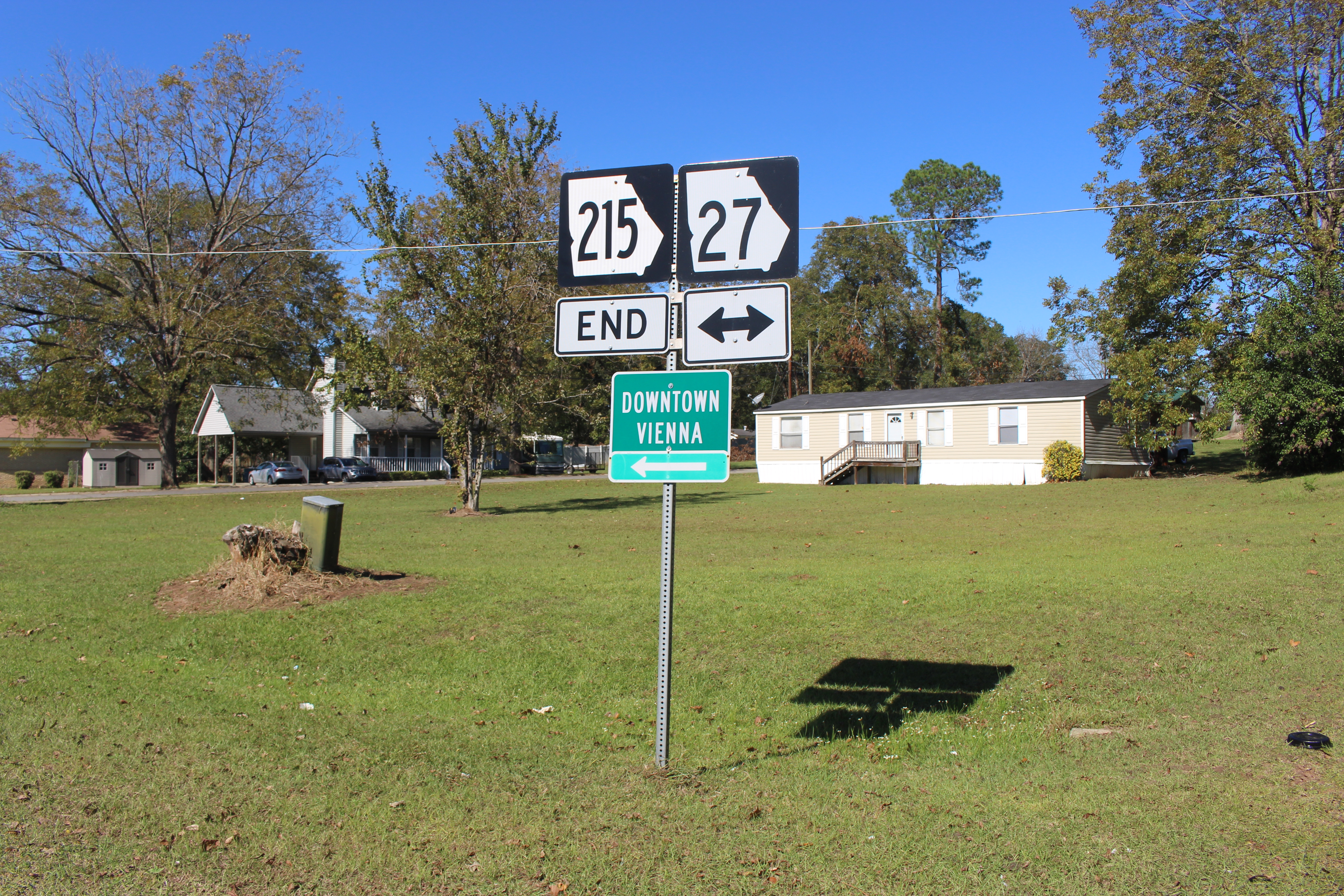
Western terminus in Vienna

SR 215 begins at an intersection with SR 27 in the eastern part of Vienna, in Dooly County. It heads east to an interchange with Interstate 75 (I-75) on the extreme eastern edge of town. It heads southeast to an intersection with SR 257. Then, it enters Wilcox County. The highway continues southeast to an intersection with US 280/SR 30 (7th Avenue W.) in Pitts. The three highways run concurrent to the east. In Rochelle, the highways intersect SR 112/SR 233 (Ashley Street). Here, US 280/SR 30 depart to the east on 1st Avenue, while SR 215 turns south onto SR 112/SR 233 for about five blocks. At the end of the concurrency, SR 112/SR 233 continue south on Ashley Street, while SR 215 heads east on 5th Avenue. It continues to the southeast and enters Ben Hill County. Shortly after entering the county it meets its eastern terminus, an intersection with SR 90 northwest of Fitzgerald.

== Major intersections ==
| County | Location | mi | km | Destinations | Notes |
|---|---|---|---|---|---|
| Dooly | Vienna | 0.0 | 0.0 | SR 27 (East Union Street/Hawkinsville Road) – Americus, Hawkinsville | Western terminus |
| Dooly | Vienna | 1.3 | 2.1 | I-75 (SR 401) – Valdosta, Macon | I-75 exit 109 |
| Dooly | | 7.7 | 12.4 | SR 257 – Cordele, Hawkinsville | |
| Wilcox | Pitts | 20.7 | 33.3 | US 280 west / SR 30 west (7th Avenue West) | Western end of US 280/SR 30 concurrency |
| Wilcox | Rochelle | 25.7 | 41.4 | US 280 east / SR 30 east (1st Avenue) / SR 112 north / SR 233 north (Ashley Street) | Eastern end of US 280/SR 30 concurrency; western end of SR 112/SR 233 concurrency |
| Wilcox | Rochelle | 26.0 | 41.8 | SR 112 south / SR 233 south (Ashley Street) | Eastern end of SR 112/SR 233 concurrency |
| Ben Hill | | 38.6 | 62.1 | SR 90 (Salem Church Road/Dewey McGlamry Road) – Rebecca, Fitzgerald | Eastern terminus |
1.000 mi = 1.609 km; 1.000 km = 0.621 mi: Concurrency terminus
