= National Register of Historic Places listings in Wilcox County, Georgia =

This is a list of properties and districts in Wilcox County, Georgia that are listed on the National Register of Historic Places (NRHP).

This National Park Service list is complete through NPS recent listings posted March 14, 2025.

== Current listings ==
| | Name on the Register | Image | Date listed | Location | City or town | Description |
|---|---|---|---|---|---|---|
| 1 | Rochelle Historic District | | January 15, 2008 (#07001398) | Centered on 1st Ave and Ashley St. 31°57′03″N 83°27′22″W | Rochelle | |
| 2 | Wilcox County Courthouse | Wilcox County Courthouse | September 18, 1980 (#80001265) | U.S. 280 and U.S. 129; 31°59′33″N 83°18′24″W | Abbeville | Built in 1903 |
