= Seville, Georgia =

Coordinates: 31°57′38″N 83°36′04″W

Seville
- Unincorporated community Census-designated place
- Location within Georgia Location within the United States
- Country: United States
- State: Georgia
- County: Wilcox

Population (2020)
  - Total: 197
- Time zone: UTC−6 (Central (CST))
  - Summer (DST): UTC−5 (CDT)

Seville is an unincorporated community and census-designated place (CDP) in Wilcox County, Georgia, United States. Per the 2020 census, the population was 197. It lies approximately 0.5 miles (0.80 km) away from the Crisp County line, and about 4 miles (6.4 km) away from Pitts.

== History ==
A post office called Seville was established in 1887. The name is a transfer from Seville, in Spain.

The Georgia General Assembly incorporated Seville as a town in 1890. The town's municipal charter was repealed in 1995.

== Demographics ==
Historical population
| Census | Pop. | Note | %± |
|---|---|---|---|
| 1980 | 209 | | — |
| 2010 | 202 | | — |
| 2020 | 197 | | −2.5% |
U.S. Decennial Census; 1850-1870 1870-1880; 1890-1910 1920-1930; 1940 1950 1960; 1970 1980 1990; 2000 2010 2020

Seville was first listed as a census designated place in the 1980 United States census.

Seville CDP, Georgia – Racial and ethnic composition Note: the US Census treats Hispanic/Latino as an ethnic category. This table excludes Latinos from the racial categories and assigns them to a separate category. Hispanics/Latinos may be of any race.
| Race / Ethnicity (NH = Non-Hispanic) | Pop 2010 | Pop 2020 | % 2010 | % 2020 |
|---|---|---|---|---|
| White alone (NH) | 177 | 141 | 87.62% | 71.57% |
| Black or African American alone (NH) | 20 | 23 | 9.90% | 11.68% |
| Native American or Alaska Native alone (NH) | 1 | 1 | 0.50% | 0.51% |
| Asian alone (NH) | 0 | 9 | 0.00% | 4.57% |
| Pacific Islander alone (NH) | 0 | 0 | 0.00% | 0.00% |
| Other race alone (NH) | 0 | 0 | 0.00% | 0.00% |
| Mixed race or Multiracial (NH) | 0 | 7 | 0.00% | 3.55% |
| Hispanic or Latino (any race) | 4 | 16 | 1.98% | 7.12% |
| Total | 202 | 197 | 100.00% | 100.00% |

In 2020, the CDP had a population of 197, down from 202 in 2010.

== Education ==
The Wilcox County School District holds pre-school to grade twelve, and consists of an elementary school, a middle school, and a high school. The district has 90 full-time teachers and over 1,439 students.

The schools, located in Rochelle, are:

- Wilcox County Elementary School
- Wilcox County Middle School
- Wilcox County High School
