= Ronnie West =

American football player (born 1968)

No. 35
- Position: Wide receiver

Personal information
- Born: June 23, 1968 (age 58); Pineview, Georgia U.S.
- Listed height: 6 ft 1 in (1.85 m)
- Listed weight: 216 lb (98 kg)

Career information
- High school: Wilcox County
- College: Pittsburg State
- NFL draft: 1992: 9th round, 237th overall pick

Career history
- Minnesota Vikings (1992–1993); London Monarchs (1995); London Monarchs (1997)

Awards and highlights
- Harlon Hill Trophy (1991)
- Stats at Pro Football Reference

Ronnie Lee West (June 23, 1968) is an American former professional football player who was a wide receiver for the Minnesota Vikings of National Football League (NFL). He played college football for the Pittsburg State University.
