= Mareshia Rucker =

American activist (born 1995)

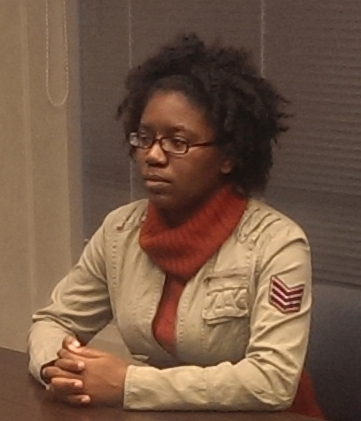
- Mareshia Rucker
- Born: 1995 (age 30–31)
- Occupation: student
- Known for: human rights advocate

Mareshia Rucker (b. 1995) is an American activist. When she was a high school senior in 2013 at Wilcox County High School in Georgia, USA, she led efforts to get her high school to hold a single, racially integrated, senior prom. Previously her high school had only allowed students to attend racially segregated parties.

Her struggles brought world-wide attention on her school, and on Rucker, personally. Rucker was interviewed by Amy Goodman on National Public Radio on April 27, 2013. Rucker disputed assertions by local politicians that there was no support for a desegrated party within the student body.

Mitch Potter, writing in the Toronto Star, reported that Rucker and her friends encountered considerable local opposition to the idea of an integrated prom. Not only wouldn't the local school board make space available, they wouldn't even sign a general letter of support for the idea of an integrated party. Potter described Mareshia as coming from a strong family, still considered newcomers to rural Rochelle, Georgia, even though her grandmother moved her family there decades ago.

Jamie Gumbrecht, of CNN characterized Mareshia as a good student, and reported that she participated in the Junior Reserve Officer Training Corps, a program the American military has to turn patriotic students into members of its military reservist program.

In November 2014, Rucker was invited to the opening of an exhibit at the Canadian Museum for Human Rights, celebrating her efforts. Rucker's prom dress was the center of the exhibit. CBC News reports that a crowdfunding campaign supplied the funds to pay for the trip of Rucker and four of her relatives, who were guests of honour at several events.
