= WWKM =

WWKM may refer to:

- WWKM (FM), a radio station (93.1 FM) licensed to serve Rochelle, Georgia, United States
- WDTR, a radio station (89.1 FM) licensed to serve Imlay City, Michigan, United States, which held the call sign WWKM from 2004 to 2011
