= John Bahnsen =

United States Army general (1934–2024)

John C. Bahnsen, Jr.
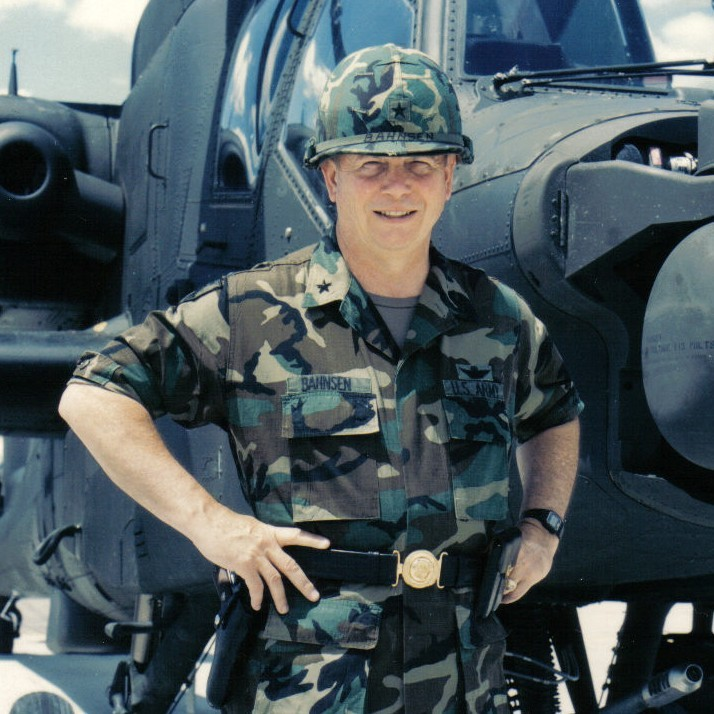
- Bahnsen as Brigadier General, mid 1980s
- Born: November 8, 1934; Albany, Georgia, U.S.
- Died: February 21, 2024 (aged 89); Rochelle, Georgia, U.S.
- Military career
- Allegiance: United States of America
- Branch: United States Army
- Service years: 1956–1986
- Rank: Brigadier General
- Nickname: Doc
- Commands: Bandit Platoon, 118th Assault Helicopter Company; Air Cavalry Troop, 11th Armored Cavalry Regiment; 1st Squadron, 11th Armored Cavalry Regiment; 1st Battalion, 32nd Armored Regiment; 1st Aviation Brigade
- Conflicts: Vietnam War
- Awards: Distinguished Service Cross, Silver Star (5), Distinguished Flying Cross (3), Legion of Merit (4), Bronze Star (4), Air Medal (51), Purple Heart (2), Meritorious Service Medal
- Other work: Consultant, writer, gentleman farmer

John C. "Doc" Bahnsen Jr. (November 8, 1934 – February 21, 2024) was a United States Army brigadier general and decorated veteran of the Vietnam War.

== Early years ==
John Charles Bahnsen Jr. was born to John C. Bahnsen and Evelyn Williams in Albany, Georgia. on November 8, 1934. His nickname, "Doc", stems from his grandfather, Dr. Peter F. Bahnsen, who immigrated with his parents to the United States from Denmark. In 1890, Peter became Georgia's first state veterinarian and operated a state-of-the-art dairy farm in Americus, Georgia.

The family moved to Rochelle, Georgia, in 1941, where John Charles Bahnsen's father worked as the federal soil conservationist for Wilcox County. Bahnsen attended Rochelle's public schools until tenth grade. Later, he went to live with his grandfather and aunt in Americus, Georgia, because the high school curriculum in Americus offered more math and science courses than Rochelle's. After 18 months in Americus, he gained admission to Marion Military Institute in Marion, Alabama. Bahnsen was then appointed to the United States Military Academy by United States Senator Walter F. George, a close political acquaintance of his grandfather Bahnsen.

== West Point ==
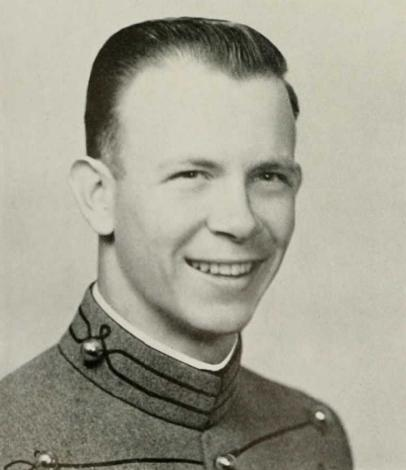
Bahnsen as a senior at West Point, 1956

Bahnsen began his studies at West Point in 1952. He won his numerals as a pole vaulter on the plebe track and field team. He also participated on intramural teams, including wrestling, lacrosse, swimming, football, and soccer.

As a cadet, Bahnsen met George S. Patton IV and Hank Emerson, who were then assigned to West Point as tactical officers, and they became his mentors. Bahnsen was a mediocre student, but excelled in military science and physical education courses On June 5, 1956, he graduated with a commission as an Infantry Second Lieutenant, ranking 406th out of 480 in his class.

== Early career ==
After graduation from the Infantry Officer Basic Course at Fort Benning, Georgia, Lieutenant Bahnsen attended Airborne School.

He married his childhood sweetheart, Patricia Fitzgerald, prior to attending Fixed Wing Flight School at Camp Gary, Texas and Fort Rucker, Alabama. They had four children: Jon Christian, Bradley Duncan, Leeanne, and James Fitzgerald.

Bahnsen's first troop assignment was in West Germany as an aviator in Artillery Flight, 3rd Aviation Company, 3rd Infantry Division. While there he transferred to the Armor branch, which led to command of B Company, 1st Battalion, 68th Armor Regiment. He excelled in command, qualifying all 17 of his company's tank crews on their first run at the Tank Crew Qualification Course in Grafenwöhr, for which he received the Army Commendation Medal.

Bahnsen next attended the Rotary Wing Aviator Course at Fort Wolters, Texas, followed by the Armor Officer Advanced Course at Fort Knox, Kentucky. He remained at the Armor School as an instructor of armored cavalry and air cavalry tactics before being assigned to Fort Leavenworth, Kansas to attend the Command and General Staff College.

== Vietnam, first tour ==
Pete Bahnsen (L) and Doc Bahnsen, Vietnam, 1965

On October 4, 1965, Bahnsen reported for duty with the 145th Combat Aviation Battalion then stationed at Tan Son Nhut Air Base, contiguous to Saigon, and was assigned to command the 118th Aviation Company's (Thunderbirds) gunship platoon (Bandits) at Bien Hoa Air Base. Among the highlights of this assignment was a mission to support Marine Aircraft Group 36, 1st Marine Aircraft Wing for Operation Double Eagle, working out of Kỳ Hà south of Da Nang, for which he was awarded his first of five Silver Stars.

Bahnsen's brother Peter (USMA, 1958) was in Vietnam at the same time, carrying out a variety of operations for the Special Forces. Peter reportedly rode with Doc on at least one helicopter assault mission.

Soon after returning from Operation Double Eagle, Bahnsen became operations officer for the 118th Aviation Company. Shortly afterwards, he was assigned to the 12th Combat Aviation Group at Long Binh and promoted to major.

While at the 12th Aviation Group Bahnsen created a "Top Gun" competition to improve helicopter weapons marksmanship by offering prizes and bragging rights for the best scores.

During this combat tour, Bahnsen had a relationship with Thach Thi Hung, "the Dragon Lady of Bien Hoa." On his departure from Vietnam, she was pregnant. Three months after he left Vietnam, Hung was killed in an automobile accident. Her son, Minh, survived the accident and later made his way to the United States, where he met his father for the first time. Minh later lived with Doc Bahnsen for about a year before returning to his home in California to pursue a career in the film industry. Minh Bahnsen has since worked on several films as an electrician and grip, including National Treasure and Thor.

== Pentagon duty ==
In December 1966, Bahnsen reported for duty with the Office of the Assistant Chief of Staff for Force Development. Assigned as a staff officer in the Army Aviation Directorate, his duties involved verifying the readiness of aviation and air cavalry units set to deploy to Vietnam. During this assignment, he enrolled in graduate courses offered by George Washington University.

In April 1968, Bahnsen was part of the Army's response to the assassination of Martin Luther King Jr., spending a day patrolling Washington, D.C. during the post-assassination rioting.

Bahnsen re-established his relationship with Patton while they were both assigned to The Pentagon, and when Patton rotated to Vietnam to take command of the 11th Armored Cavalry Regiment, he arranged to have Bahnsen released from staff duties early in order to take command of the regiment's Air Cavalry Troop.

== Vietnam, second tour ==
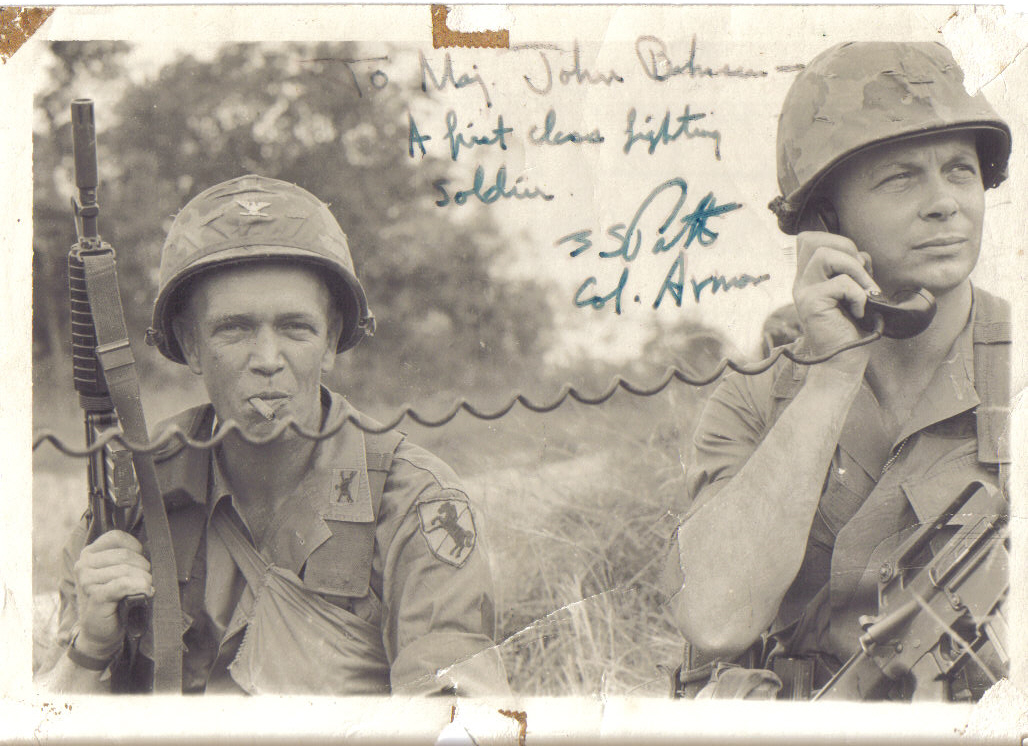
COL George S. Patton (L) and MAJ Doc Bahnsen

Arriving in Vietnam on October 14, 1968, Bahnsen assumed command of a troop composed of UH-1 "slicks" (troop transport helicopters), OH-6 scout helicopters, AH-1 gunships, and an infantry aero rifle platoon (ARPs).

Bahnsen's Air Cav troop saw action daily. As an example, one of its ARPs, Specialist Fourth Class Jim Weller, was involved in 300 enemy contacts during his 13 months in Vietnam. Bahnsen frequently fought from the air in his UH-1 command and control helicopter, and often joined his troops on the ground to lead infantry operations. During this period his reputation for combat leadership and courage under fire grew to near-legendary proportions.

On January 1, 1969, Bahnsen was piloting his helicopter during combat when a white phosphorus grenade exploded inside the aircraft. Crew member Rodney J. T. Yano was burned, and ammunition inside the aircraft started to detonate. Though he had lost the use of one arm and couldn't see well, he continued to throw burning and exploding munitions off the aircraft, further injuring himself. Yano died as a result, but prevented a crash and additional deaths or injuries to the crew. He received the Medal of Honor, and Bahnsen was active in other efforts to recognize Yano, including a tank range at Fort Knox, a hangar at Fort Rucker, and a vehicle washing facility at Fort Benning.

In January 1969 Bahnsen was involved in an action which included landing under fire to mark a landing zone, firing on the enemy with his rifle while he directed artillery fire from his low-flying command and control helicopter, evacuating his crew members after they were wounded, and leading a subsequent infantry ground attack. He received the Distinguished Service Cross.

During his command he began a relationship with Phyllis "Fif" Shaughnessy, a civilian employee of the International Recreation Association under contract with the U.S. State Department. Bahnsen and his wife Pat were divorced at the end of his tour, and he and Fif were married.

Col. Leach and Maj. Bahnsen

Patton was succeeded by Colonel Jimmie Leach, a battle-hardened veteran of World War II and Korea, who assigned Bahnsen to command the regiment's 1st Squadron, which included a headquarters troop with aviation section, three armored cavalry troops, a tank company, a howitzer battery, and an attached platoon of combat engineers. Squadrons are normally commanded by lieutenant colonels, and Bahnsen was the only major to command a squadron in the 11th Armored Cavalry Regiment during the Vietnam War.

Under Bahnsen's command, 1st Squadron was engaged in enemy contacts over a broad area of the III Corps Tactical Zone, the military region between Saigon and the Central Highlands, particularly the Iron Triangle, the K4 Woods, the Fishhook, and the Michelin Rubber Plantation. Elements of the squadron were often under the operational control of units in the 1st Infantry Division, 1st Cavalry Division, 25th Infantry Division, and 18th Division.

Bahnsen ended his second tour in Vietnam on September 8, 1969. On September 6, 1st Squadron had a major enemy contact in the Michelin Plantation, for which Bahnsen received his fifth Silver Star.

Bahnsen disagreed with the Nixon Administration's efforts to seek a negotiated peace agreement with the North Vietnamese. Bahnsen long argued that the U.S., South Vietnam and other allies were winning the war and would have achieved a military victory had the "fog of politics" not obscured the tactical success.

== Post-Vietnam career ==
As a newly promoted lieutenant colonel, Bahnsen was assigned to West Germany as commander of 1st Battalion, 32nd Armor, serving from 1969 to 1971.

After completing his battalion command, Bahnsen attended the Army War College, concurrently completing a Master of Science degree in public administration from Shippensburg State College.

Three years after Bahnsen and Fif Shaughnessy were married, they divorced and Bahnsen remarried his first wife, Pat.

After completing the War College, Bahnsen was assigned to the Combat Arms Training Board at Fort Benning as the Armor team leader. The board worked to develop state-of-the-art training methods and systems, with its most notable success being the Multiple Integrated Laser Engagement System (MILES) which remains one of the Army's most important training systems.

In 1974 Bahnsen and his wife Pat were divorced for the second time, and he subsequently married Peggy Miller. Miller later joined the Army and served in the Adjutant General Corps, retiring as a lieutenant colonel after 20 years in uniform.

Bahnsen was next assigned to the Training and Doctrine Command (TRADOC), where he played a key role in the establishment of the Fort Irwin National Training Center. He directed major studies to improve Army training and readiness, and oversaw the production of How-To-Fight booklets and training films.

Receiving an early promotion to colonel, Bahnsen was assigned to Fort Rucker as the first TRADOC Program Manager for Attack Helicopters. His next assignment was Commander of the 1st Aviation Brigade. He was then promoted to brigadier general and assigned as Assistant Division Commander of the 2nd Armored Division. He then served as Chief of Staff of the Combined Field Army (Republic of Korea/United States) in South Korea.

After his tour in Korea, Bahnsen was assigned as Chief of Staff for the III Armored Corps at Fort Hood.

== Retirement ==
Retiring in 1986, Bahnsen returned to West Point, where his wife Peggy was the first woman to serve as a regimental tactical officer (RTO), placing her in command of one-quarter of the Corps of Cadets. He was employed as a Program Manager at BDM Corporation, and then formed his own firm, Bahnsen, Inc., which performed consulting services for military and defense contractors.

After his wife's retirement, the Bahnsens settled in her hometown, New Cumberland, West Virginia. In addition to operating the Miller Family Farm, they were active in the Republican Party, and both served on the state Republican Committee. They were participants in Camp Lincoln, a week-long summer camp for West Virginia teenagers.

Bahnsen built a wildlife habitat in one of the farm's wooded areas, and raised corn and milo to feed the quail, doves, pheasants, and deer that lived on the property. The Bahnsens maintained a stream-fed pond for fishing. He raised and trained English pointers, hosted an annual invitation-only dove shoot, and hunted fast-flying birds in the Midwest each year.

Active in his West Point class reunions and other events, Bahnsen gave lectures on leadership to Army audiences. He died from heart failure at his home in Rochelle, Georgia, on February 21, 2024, at the age of 89.

== Awards ==
Bahnsen was one of the most highly decorated officers of the Vietnam War. His awards include:

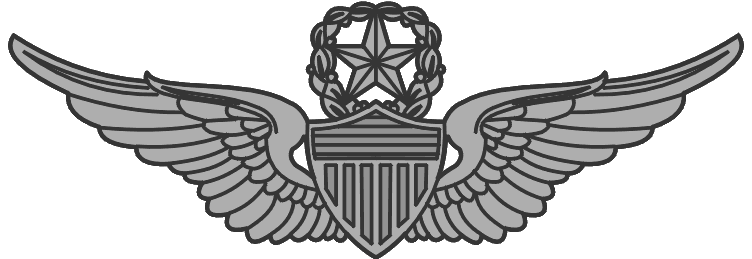

Army Master Aviator Badge
Parachutist Badge
| Distinguished Service Cross | | Silver Star with 4 bronze oak leaf clusters |
| Legion of Merit with 3 bronze oak leaf clusters | Distinguished Flying Cross with 2 bronze oak leaf clusters | Bronze Star with Combat V and 3 bronze oak leaf clusters |
| Purple Heart with 1 bronze oak leaf cluster | Meritorious Service Medal | Air Medal with Combat V and Award numerals 51 |
| Army Commendation Medal with Combat V and 3 bronze oak leaf cluster | National Defense Service Medal with 1 bronze service star | Vietnam Service Medal with 1 silver and 2 bronze campaign stars |
| Korean Defense Service Medal | Army Service Ribbon | Army Overseas Service Ribbon with Award numeral 2 |
| Vietnam Cross of Gallantry with Silver and Gold Stars | Order of National Security Merit; Cheon-Su Medal (Korea) | Vietnam Campaign Medal |

| Army Meritorious Unit Commendation | Navy Unit Commendation | Republic of Vietnam Gallantry Cross Unit Citation with Palm |

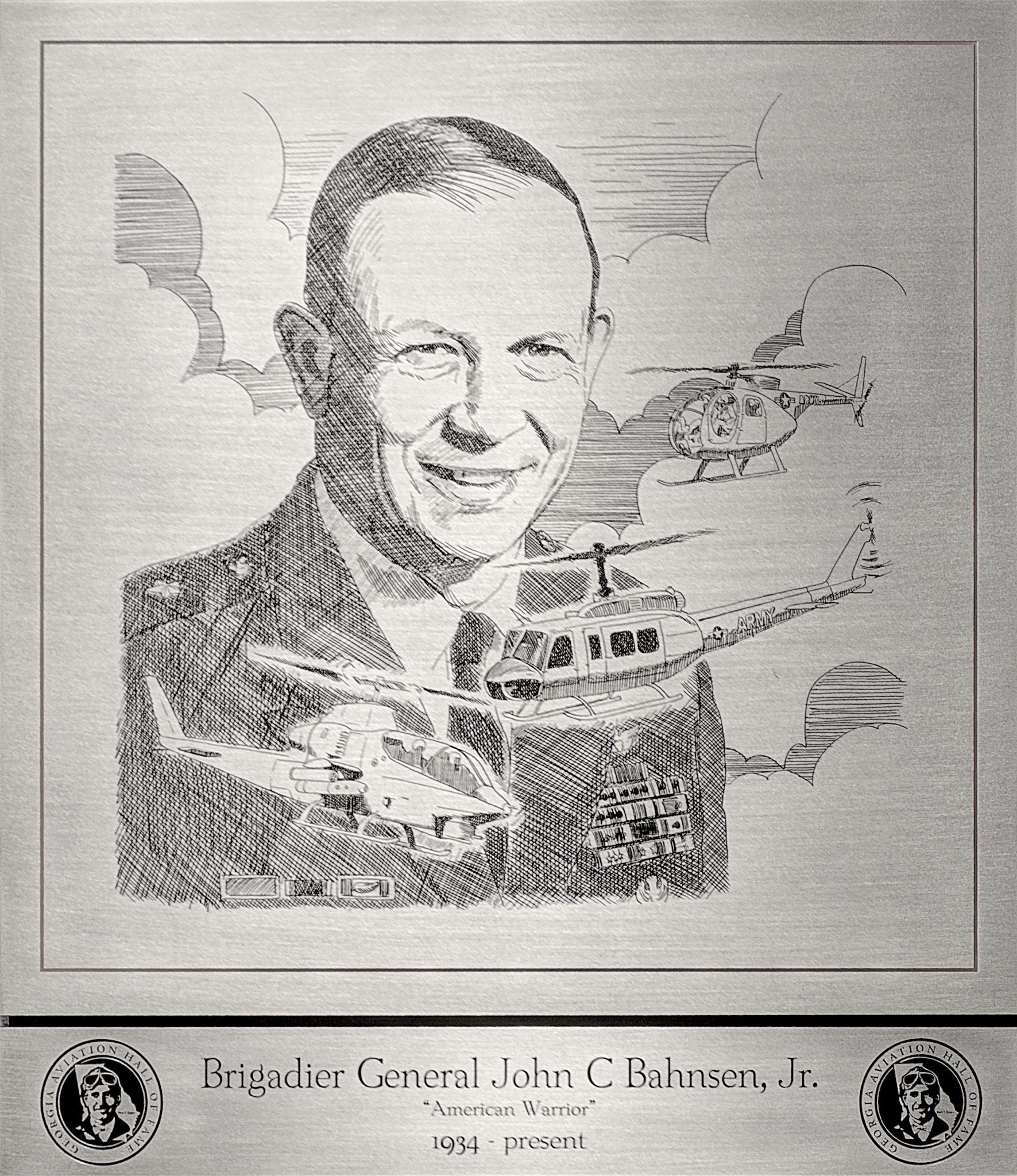
Plaque honoring Bahnsen at the Georgia Aviation Hall of Fame

After retirement, Bahnsen was awarded the Order of Saint George (Gold) by the U.S. Army Armor Association, Order of Military Medical Merit (O2M3) by the Army Medical Regiment, Order of Saint Michael (Bronze) by the Army Aviation Association of America, and Order of Saint Barbara by the U.S. Army Field Artillery Association

Bahnsen was a member of the Army Aviation Hall of Fame and the Georgia Aviation Hall of Fame.

== Legacy ==
Bahnsen and his brother Peter, who retired from the Army as a lieutenant colonel, were rugby enthusiasts, and established the Bahnsen Pistol Award, presented annually to the captain of West Point's rugby team in honor of their parents.

The Bahnsens also endowed the Future American Warrior Award at Marion Military Institute, a pistol presented each year to the graduate who demonstrates the most leadership potential.

The West Point class of 1956 funded the building of the Bahnsen Conference Room in the Anderson Rugby Complex at West Point.

== Books authored ==
- American Warrior: A Combat Memoir of Vietnam, with Wess Roberts, foreword by H. Norman Schwarzkopf. (ISBN 0-8065-2807-9 ISBN 978-0-8065-2807-6)

== See also ==
- Interview, Brigadier General John "Doc" Bahnsen, Gene Pell, Podbay.fm Open Podcasting
