= Wilcox County, Georgia =

County in Georgia, United States

- County
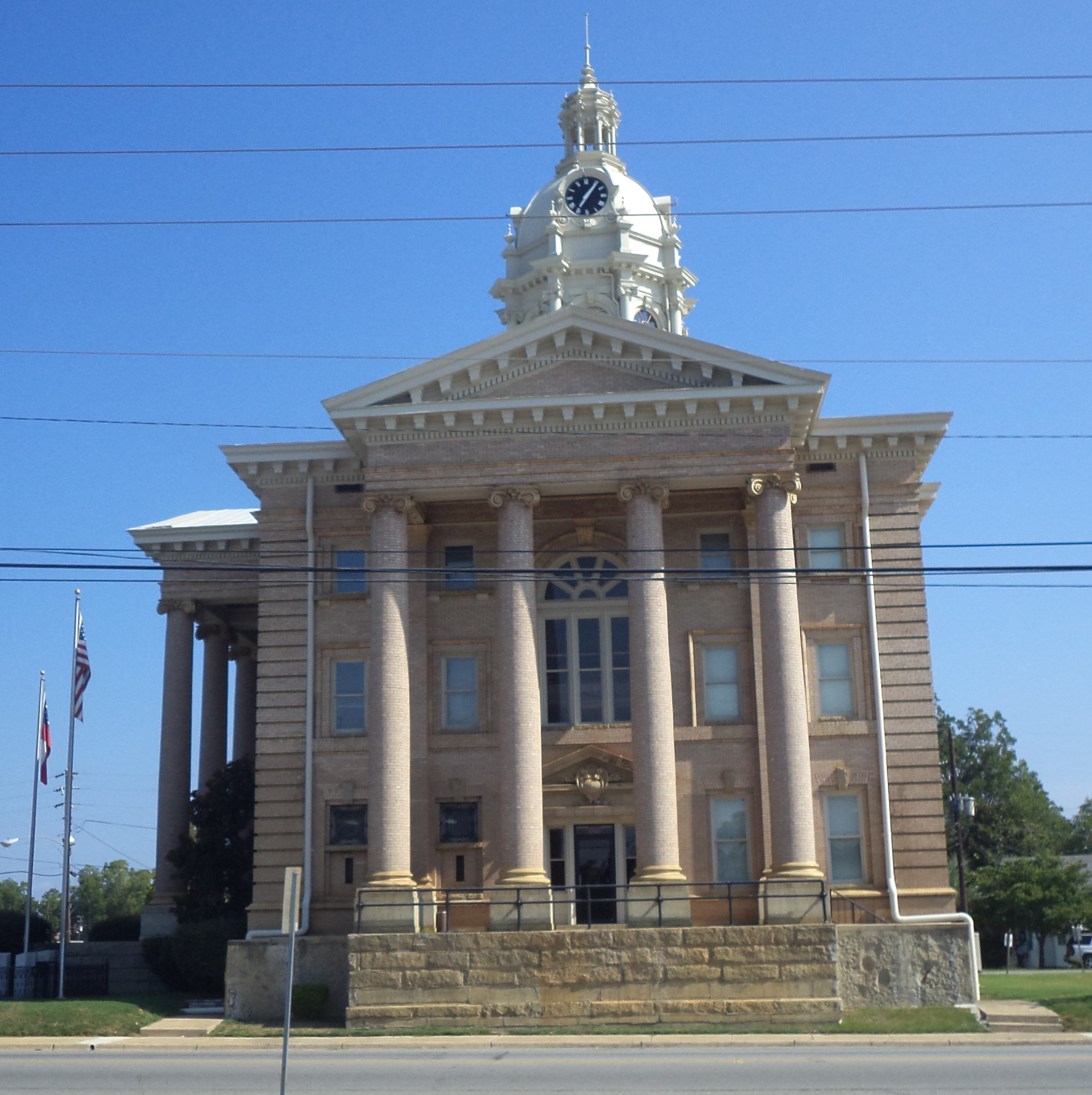
- Wilcox County Courthouse in Abbeville

- Location within the U.S. state of Georgia
- Coordinates: 31°58′N 83°26′W
- Country: United States
- State: Georgia
- Founded: December 22, 1857; 168 years ago
- Named for: Mark Wilcox
- Seat: Abbeville
- Largest city: Abbeville

Area
  - Total: 382 sq mi (990 km^{2})
  - Land: 378 sq mi (980 km^{2})
  - Water: 4.4 sq mi (11 km^{2}) 1.2%

Population (2020)
  - Total: 8,766
  - Estimate (2025): 8,797 ▲
  - Density: 23/sq mi (8.9/km^{2})
- Time zone: UTC−5 (Eastern)
  - Summer (DST): UTC−4 (EDT)
- Congressional district: 8th
- Website: www.wilcoxcountygeorgia.com

Wilcox County is a county located in the southern portion of the U.S. state of Georgia. As of the 2020 census, the population was 8,766. The county seat is Abbeville.

== History ==
Wilcox County was formed on December 22, 1857, from parts of Irwin, Pulaski, and Dooly counties. The county was named for General Mark Wilcox, a Georgia state legislator and one of the founders of the Georgia Supreme Court.

The first county courthouse was built in 1858; the present courthouse dates from 1903.

== Geography ==
According to the U.S. Census Bureau, the county has a total area of 382 square miles (990 km^{2}), of which 378 square miles (980 km^{2}) is land and 4.4 square miles (11 km^{2}) (1.2%) is water.

The northern and eastern three-quarters of Wilcox County, from State Route 215 southeast to Rochelle, then due south, are located in the Lower Ocmulgee River sub-basin of the Altamaha River basin. The southwestern portion of the county, west of Rochelle, and roughly centered on Pitts, is located in the Alapaha River sub-basin of the Suwannee River basin.

=== Adjacent counties ===
- Pulaski County - north
- Dodge County - east
- Telfair County - east
- Ben Hill County - south
- Turner County - southwest
- Crisp County - west
- Dooly County - northwest

=== Major highways ===
- U.S. Route 129 / State Route 11
- U.S. Route 280 / State Route 30
- State Route 90
- State Route 112
- State Route 159
- State Route 215
- State Route 233
- State Route 257

== Communities ==
=== Cities ===
- Abbeville
- Pitts
- Rochelle

=== Town ===
- Pineview

=== Census-designated place ===
- Seville

== Demographics ==
Historical population
Census	Pop.	Note	%±
1860	2,115		—
1870	2,439		15.3%
1880	3,109		27.5%
1890	7,980		156.7%
1900	11,097		39.1%
1910	13,486		21.5%
1920	15,511		15.0%
1930	13,439		−13.4%
1940	12,755		−5.1%
1950	10,167		−20.3%
1960	7,905		−22.2%
1970	6,998		−11.5%
1980	7,682		9.8%
1990	7,008		−8.8%
2000	8,577		22.4%
2010	9,255		7.9%
2020	8,766		−5.3%
2025 (est.)	8,797	▲	0.4%
U.S. Decennial Census; 1790-1880 1890-1910; 1920-1930 1930-1940; 1940-1950 1960-1980; 1980-2000 2010 2020

=== Racial and ethnic composition ===
Wilcox County, Georgia – Racial and ethnic composition Note: the US Census treats Hispanic/Latino as an ethnic category. This table excludes Latinos from the racial categories and assigns them to a separate category. Hispanics/Latinos may be of any race.
Race / Ethnicity (NH = Non-Hispanic)	Pop 1980	Pop 1990	Pop 2000	Pop 2010	Pop 2020	% 1980	% 1990	% 2000	% 2010	% 2020
White alone (NH)	5,207	4,745	5,299	5,544	5,185	67.78%	67.71%	61.78%	59.90%	59.15%
Black or African American alone (NH)	2,418	2,222	3,091	3,233	3,096	31.48%	31.71%	36.04%	34.93%	35.32%
Native American or Alaska Native alone (NH)	0	9	8	15	3	0.00%	0.13%	0.09%	0.16%	0.03%
Asian alone (NH)	2	2	14	41	49	0.03%	0.03%	0.16%	0.44%	0.56%
Native Hawaiian or Pacific Islander alone (NH)	x	x	1	1	3	x	x	0.01%	0.01%	0.03%
Other race alone (NH)	0	0	0	12	9	0.00%	0.00%	0.00%	0.13%	0.10%
Mixed race or Multiracial (NH)	x	x	25	71	149	x	x	0.29%	0.77%	1.70%
Hispanic or Latino (any race)	55	30	139	338	272	0.72%	0.43%	1.62%	3.65%	3.10%
Total	7,682	7,008	8,577	9,255	8,766	100.00%	100.00%	100.00%	100.00%	100.00%

=== 2020 census ===
As of the 2020 census, the county had a population of 8,766, 2,811 households, and 1,807 families residing in the county. The median age was 42.3 years, 17.7% of residents were under the age of 18, and 18.2% of residents were 65 years of age or older. For every 100 females there were 144.0 males, and for every 100 females age 18 and over there were 152.1 males age 18 and over. 0.0% of residents lived in urban areas, while 100.0% lived in rural areas.

The racial makeup of the county was 59.9% White, 35.4% Black or African American, 0.0% American Indian and Alaska Native, 0.6% Asian, 0.0% Native Hawaiian and Pacific Islander, 1.5% from some other race, and 2.6% from two or more races. Hispanic or Latino residents of any race comprised 3.1% of the population.

There were 2,811 households in the county, of which 29.8% had children under the age of 18 living with them and 31.2% had a female householder with no spouse or partner present. About 28.7% of all households were made up of individuals and 13.7% had someone living alone who was 65 years of age or older.

There were 3,440 housing units, of which 18.3% were vacant. Among occupied housing units, 75.0% were owner-occupied and 25.0% were renter-occupied. The homeowner vacancy rate was 1.5% and the rental vacancy rate was 6.0%.

== Education ==
The county is served by Wilcox County Schools. The district headquarters are in Abbeville and the schools, including Wilcox County High School, are in Rochelle.

== Notable event ==
The Ocmulgee Wild Hog Festival takes place in Abbeville annually on the Saturday before Mother's Day.

== Politics ==
As of the 2020s, Wilcox County is a strongly Republican voting county, voting 74% for Donald Trump in 2024. For elections to the United States House of Representatives, Wilcox County is part of Georgia's 8th congressional district, currently represented by Austin Scott. For elections to the Georgia State Senate, Wilcox County is part of District 20. For elections to the Georgia House of Representatives, Wilcox County is part of District 148.

United States presidential election results for Wilcox County, Georgia
Year	Republican		Democratic		Third party(ies)	
Year	No.	%	No.	%	No.	%
1912	29	5.10%	525	92.27%	15	2.64%
1916	58	8.79%	590	89.39%	12	1.82%
1920	106	18.06%	481	81.94%	0	0.00%
1924	21	4.29%	431	87.96%	38	7.76%
1928	216	32.00%	459	68.00%	0	0.00%
1932	25	3.88%	619	95.97%	1	0.16%
1936	195	15.44%	1,066	84.40%	2	0.16%
1940	118	11.60%	890	87.51%	9	0.88%
1944	206	13.12%	1,364	86.88%	0	0.00%
1948	75	6.73%	791	70.94%	249	22.33%
1952	301	13.81%	1,878	86.19%	0	0.00%
1956	232	12.10%	1,686	87.90%	0	0.00%
1960	306	15.15%	1,714	84.85%	0	0.00%
1964	1,794	66.59%	900	33.41%	0	0.00%
1968	381	14.28%	465	17.43%	1,822	68.29%
1972	1,863	85.54%	315	14.46%	0	0.00%
1976	346	13.85%	2,153	86.15%	0	0.00%
1980	827	31.44%	1,780	67.68%	23	0.87%
1984	1,218	50.12%	1,212	49.88%	0	0.00%
1988	1,235	53.26%	1,079	46.53%	5	0.22%
1992	916	33.64%	1,365	50.13%	442	16.23%
1996	882	41.56%	1,067	50.28%	173	8.15%
2000	1,381	58.39%	962	40.68%	22	0.93%
2004	1,705	65.18%	902	34.48%	9	0.34%
2008	2,159	68.24%	978	30.91%	27	0.85%
2012	2,053	65.55%	1,060	33.84%	19	0.61%
2016	2,096	70.43%	852	28.63%	28	0.94%
2020	2,402	73.25%	861	26.26%	16	0.49%
2024	2,493	74.48%	847	25.31%	7	0.21%

United States Senate election results for Wilcox County, Georgia2
Year	Republican		Democratic		Third party(ies)	
Year	No.	%	No.	%	No.	%
2020	2,369	73.34%	805	24.92%	56	1.73%
2020	2,085	73.21%	763	26.79%	0	0.00%

United States Senate election results for Wilcox County, Georgia3
Year	Republican		Democratic		Third party(ies)	
Year	No.	%	No.	%	No.	%
2020	1,155	35.90%	538	16.72%	1,524	47.37%
2020	2,403	73.60%	862	26.40%	0	0.00%
2022	1,947	74.51%	644	24.65%	22	0.84%
2022	1,765	74.16%	615	25.84%	0	0.00%

Georgia Gubernatorial election results for Wilcox County
Year	Republican		Democratic		Third party(ies)	
Year	No.	%	No.	%	No.	%
2022	1,998	76.23%	613	23.39%	10	0.38%

== See also ==
- National Register of Historic Places listings in Wilcox County, Georgia
- List of counties in Georgia
