= Wilcox County School District =

Wilcox County School District may refer to:

- Wilcox County School District (Alabama)
- Wilcox County School District (Georgia)
