= Nick Marshall =

American football player (born 1992)

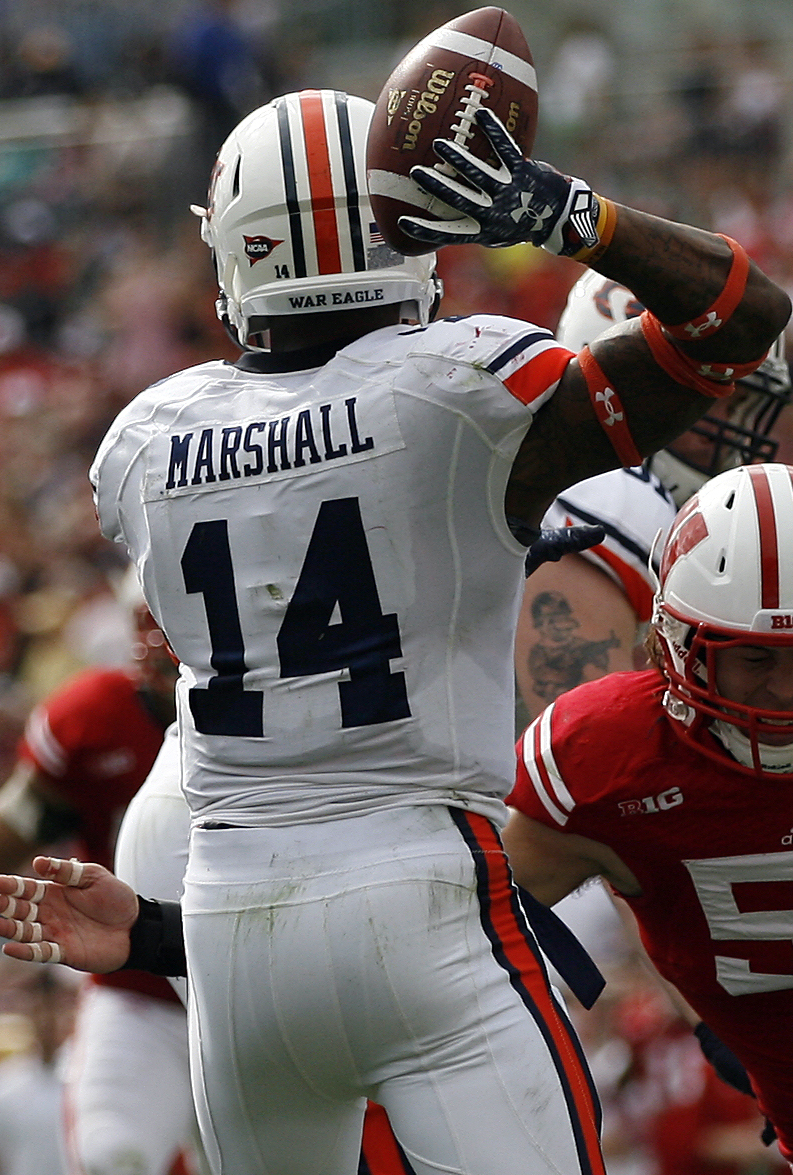
- Marshall with the Auburn Tigers in 2015

No. 41, 30, 24, 3
- Position: Cornerback

Personal information
- Born: June 30, 1992 (age 34); Pineview, Georgia, U.S.
- Listed height: 6 ft 1 in (1.85 m)
- Listed weight: 210 lb (95 kg)

Career information
- High school: Wilcox County (Rochelle, Georgia)
- College: Georgia (2011); Garden City CC (2012); Auburn (2013–2014)
- NFL draft: 2015: undrafted

Career history
- Jacksonville Jaguars (2015–2016); New York Jets (2016); Arizona Rattlers (2018)*; Saskatchewan Roughriders (2018–2023)
- * Offseason or practice squad member only

Awards and highlights
- CFL West All-Star (2021)

Career NFL statistics
- Total tackles: 18
- Pass deflections: 1
- Return yards: 643
- Stats at Pro Football Reference

Career CFL statistics
- Total tackles: 150
- Forced fumbles: 1
- Interceptions: 20
- Total touchdowns: 12
- Stats at CFL.ca

Nicholas Deshawn Marshall Sr. (born June 30, 1992) is an American former professional football player who was a cornerback in the National Football League (NFL) and Canadian Football League (CFL). He was signed as an undrafted free agent by the NFL's Jacksonville Jaguars following the 2015 NFL draft. He played college football for the Auburn Tigers as a quarterback and was their starter from 2013 to 2014. He also played for the New York Jets and Saskatchewan Roughriders.

== Early life ==
Marshall was born in Pineview, Georgia, the son of Phillip Marshall and Shalena Cliett, and attended high school at Wilcox County High School in Rochelle, Georgia. He was a three-sport star in basketball, football and track. He was named the boys basketball AP Class A player of the year twice. In football, he led Wilcox County to the Class A championship as a junior, while passing for 2,956 yards and 32 touchdowns. He was named the Class A Offensive Player of the Year as well as a part of the PrepStar All-American team, SuperPrep All-Dixie team, and Atlanta Journal-Constitution "Super 11" team. As a freshman, he joined the school's track & field team, and with only two weeks of training, he qualified for the state finals in the high jump by leaping 1.78 meters (5-10) at the Region 2A Boys Meet. At the Georgia Class A State Meet, he finished fifth in the high jump, recording a career-best leap of 1.93 meters (6-4). After that meet, he never competed in track again.

Marshall decided on going to the University of Georgia for college because he was offered the opportunity to play both basketball and football.

== College career ==
Marshall began his college career in 2011 as a cornerback for the Georgia Bulldogs. Marshall and two teammates were dismissed from the team for an unspecified "violation of team rules." This incident was reported at the time, and later confirmed by Marshall, to be stealing money from a teammate’s dorm room.

Marshall transferred to Garden City Community College where he was the starting quarterback in 2012 and led the team to a 7–4 record while scoring 37 touchdowns (19 rushing, 18 passing), passing for 3,142 yards, and becoming the team’s leading rusher with 1,095 yards. After one season with Garden City Community College, Marshall then transferred to Auburn University with the hope of playing quarterback.

=== Starting quarterback for Auburn ===
In August 2013, Marshall was named starting quarterback for Tigers. This came after a heated four-man race for the position in head coach Gus Malzahn's newly installed offense which saw 2012 starting quarterback Kiehl Frazier transfer to safety on the defensive side of the ball.

Marshall was instrumental in Auburn's turnaround from a 3–9 season in 2012 to beginning the 2013 season 9–1 while beating the Ole Miss Rebels, then ranked #24 in the AP Poll and #7 Texas A&M Aggies.

On November 16, 2013, Marshall was the quarterback behind a play known as "The Prayer at Jordan-Hare" when he threw a 73-yard Hail Mary touchdown pass to Ricardo Louis on a 4th-and-18 with 36 seconds left to defeat the Georgia Bulldogs.

On November 30, 2013, Marshall threw the game-tying touchdown pass with 32 seconds remaining in the epic 2013 Iron Bowl to even the score 28–28. Auburn won the game on a 109-yard touchdown return from an Alabama missed field goal. The team later went on to win the SEC Championship, and earned a berth in the 2014 BCS National Championship Game and lost.

He was later named a Maxwell Award semifinalist and received the Pat Sullivan Award. Marshall was a Heisman Trophy candidate and finished 14th in voting.

After his time at Auburn, he decided to enter the 2015 NFL Draft.

==== Statistics ====
Year	Team	Passing						Rushing			
Year	Team	Comp	Att	Yds	TD	Int	Rate	Att	Yds	Avg	TD
2013	Auburn	142	239	1,976	14	6	143.2	172	1,068	6.2	12
2014	Auburn	178	293	2,532	20	7	148.7	153	798	5.2	11

== Professional career ==
=== Pre-draft ===
Pre-draft measurables
Height	Weight	Arm length	Hand span	40-yard dash	10-yard split	20-yard split	20-yard shuttle	Three-cone drill	Vertical jump	Broad jump	Bench press
6 ft 1 1/2 in (1.87 m)	207 lb (94 kg)	32 1/8 in (0.82 m)	9 1/4 in (0.23 m)	4.54 s	1.60 s	2.65 s	4.15 s	6.96 s	37.5 in (0.95 m)	10 ft 4 in (3.15 m)	12 reps
All values from NFL Combine

Although he was invited to the 2015 Senior Bowl as a quarterback, Marshall announced during the week that he would move to cornerback in his attempt for an NFL career.

=== Jacksonville Jaguars ===
Marshall was signed by the Jacksonville Jaguars as a free-agent after going undrafted in the 2015 NFL draft He played primarily on special teams including returning kickoffs for most of the season but saw his role on defense increase the last four weeks of the season. He started his first NFL game Week 17 against the Houston Texans. On September 3, 2016, he was released by the Jaguars. He was signed to the Jaguars' practice squad the next day.

=== New York Jets ===
On October 12, 2016, Marshall was signed by the Jets off of the Jaguars' practice squad.

On April 14, 2017, Marshall was suspended four games for testing positive on performance-enhancing drugs. Marshall was waived by the Jets on May 4.

=== Arizona Rattlers ===
On November 2, 2017, Marshall was signed to the Arizona Rattlers of the Indoor Football League (IFL), alongside his brother, defensive back Antonio Marshall. However, both brothers departed the team before the 2018 IFL season began, with Nick signing in the CFL.

=== Saskatchewan Roughriders ===
In April 2018, Marshall signed with the Saskatchewan Roughriders of the Canadian Football League (CFL). After the preseason, Marshall was named a starter at cornerback for the 2018 season. In Week 1 against the Toronto Argonauts, Marshall recorded an interception for a touchdown for the game-winning points in the 27–19 victory, but was subsequently placed on the six-game injured list following a broken finger. Marshall recorded another 'pick-six' in addition to a rushing touchdown in the Riders Week 10 win over the Calgary Stampeders. Marshall was subsequently used as a situational rusher on short yardage and goal-line plays, recording 18 rushes for 48 yards and 7 touchdowns. In 13 games, Marshall finished the regular season with 26 tackles, 3 interceptions (two of which were returned for scores), and one forced fumble. The 2019 Roughriders finished in first place for the West Division, and under new head coach Craig Dickenson, Marshall relinquished rushing duties, resulting in an improved year as a defensive back; in 17 games played, Marshall recorded 39 tackles and five interceptions, one of which was taken back for a score.

Marshall signed a one-year contract extension with the Roughriders on December 22, 2020.

Marshall was released by the Roughriders on November 13, 2023 after Marshall was arrested for a firearm possession charge in his home state of Georgia on November 8, 2023.
