= Bug Howard =

American football player (born 1994)

No. 87
- Position: Tight end

Personal information
- Born: November 28, 1994 (age 31); Rochelle, Georgia, U.S.
- Listed height: 6 ft 5 in (1.96 m)
- Listed weight: 228 lb (103 kg)

Career information
- High school: Wilcox County (Rochelle, Georgia)
- College: North Carolina (2013–2016)
- NFL draft: 2017: undrafted

Career history
- Indianapolis Colts (2017)*; Cleveland Browns (2017–2018)*; Carolina Panthers (2018)*; Atlanta Legends (2019); Denver Broncos (2019–2020)*; Jacksonville Jaguars (2020)*; Buffalo Bills (2021)*; Philadelphia Stars (2022); Tampa Bay Buccaneers (2022)*; Philadelphia Stars (2023)
- * Offseason or practice squad member only
- Stats at Pro Football Reference

Johnathan "Bug" Howard (born November 28, 1994) is an American former football tight end. He played college football at North Carolina.

== Early life ==
Howard, who was given the nickname "Bug" by his grandmother when he was a toddler, attended Wilcox County High School in Rochelle, Georgia.

== College career ==
Howard caught 22 passes in his freshman season at North Carolina. Howard scored the first touchdown of the 2015 college football season, his junior year, when he caught a touchdown pass from quarterback Marquise Williams in their game against the South Carolina Gamecocks.

In his four-year career at UNC, Howard played in 46 games. He caught 146 passes for 2,048 yards and scored 18 touchdowns. He had just four dropped passes in four seasons at UNC.

=== Statistics ===
Year	Team	GP	Rec	Yds	Avg	TD
2013	North Carolina	10	22	278	12.6	4
2014	North Carolina	12	42	455	10.8	2
2015	North Carolina	12	29	488	16.8	4
2016	North Carolina	12	53	827	15.6	8
Career		46	146	2,048	14.0	18

== Professional career ==
=== Indianapolis Colts ===
After going undrafted in the 2017 NFL draft, Howard was signed as a free agent by the Indianapolis Colts. He was waived by the Colts at the end of the 2017 preseason.

=== Cleveland Browns ===
On September 26, 2017, Howard was signed to the Cleveland Browns' practice squad. He signed a reserve/future contract with the Browns on January 1, 2018. He was waived by the Browns on April 12, 2018.

=== Carolina Panthers ===
On May 14, 2018, Howard signed with the Carolina Panthers. He was waived on August 31, 2018, as part of final roster cuts.

=== Atlanta Legends ===
On November 9, 2018, Howard signed with the Atlanta Legends of the Alliance of American Football (AAF) for the 2019 season.

=== Denver Broncos ===
After the AAF ceased operations in April 2019, Howard signed with the Denver Broncos on May 13, 2019, following a mini-camp tryout. He was placed on injured reserve on August 21, 2019. He was waived from injured reserve with an injury settlement on August 30, 2019. He was re-signed to the practice squad on December 4, 2019. He signed a reserve/future contract with the Broncos on December 31, 2019. He was waived on April 27, 2020.

Howard joined the Alphas of The Spring League for its 2020 Fall season.

=== Jacksonville Jaguars ===
On December 14, 2020, Howard signed with the practice squad of the Jacksonville Jaguars. His practice squad contract with the team expired after the season on January 11, 2021.

=== Buffalo Bills ===
On July 30, 2021, Howard signed with the Buffalo Bills. He was waived on August 24, 2021.

=== Philadelphia Stars ===
Howard was drafted by the Philadelphia Stars of the United States Football League (USFL) in the 18th round of the 2022 USFL draft. He was placed on the "did not report" list on April 1, but joined the team for training camp three days later. He signed a contract with the team on April 7.

=== Tampa Bay Buccaneers ===
On July 29, 2022, Howard signed with the Tampa Bay Buccaneers. He was waived/injured on August 23 and placed on injured reserve. He was released on August 30.

=== Philadelphia Stars (second stint) ===
On February 8, 2023, Howard signed with the Stars for his second stint with the team. He was transferred to the team's inactive list on March 19, 2023. The Stars folded when the XFL and USFL merged to create the United Football League (UFL).

=== Statistics ===
USFL statistics
Year	Team	Games		Receiving					Fumbles	
Year	Team	GP	GS	Rec	Yds	Avg	Lng	TD	Fum	Lost
2022	PHI	10	8	30	371	12.4	41	4	0	0
Career		10	8	30	371	12.4	41	4	0	0
