= Alfonzo Dennard =

American football player (born 1989)

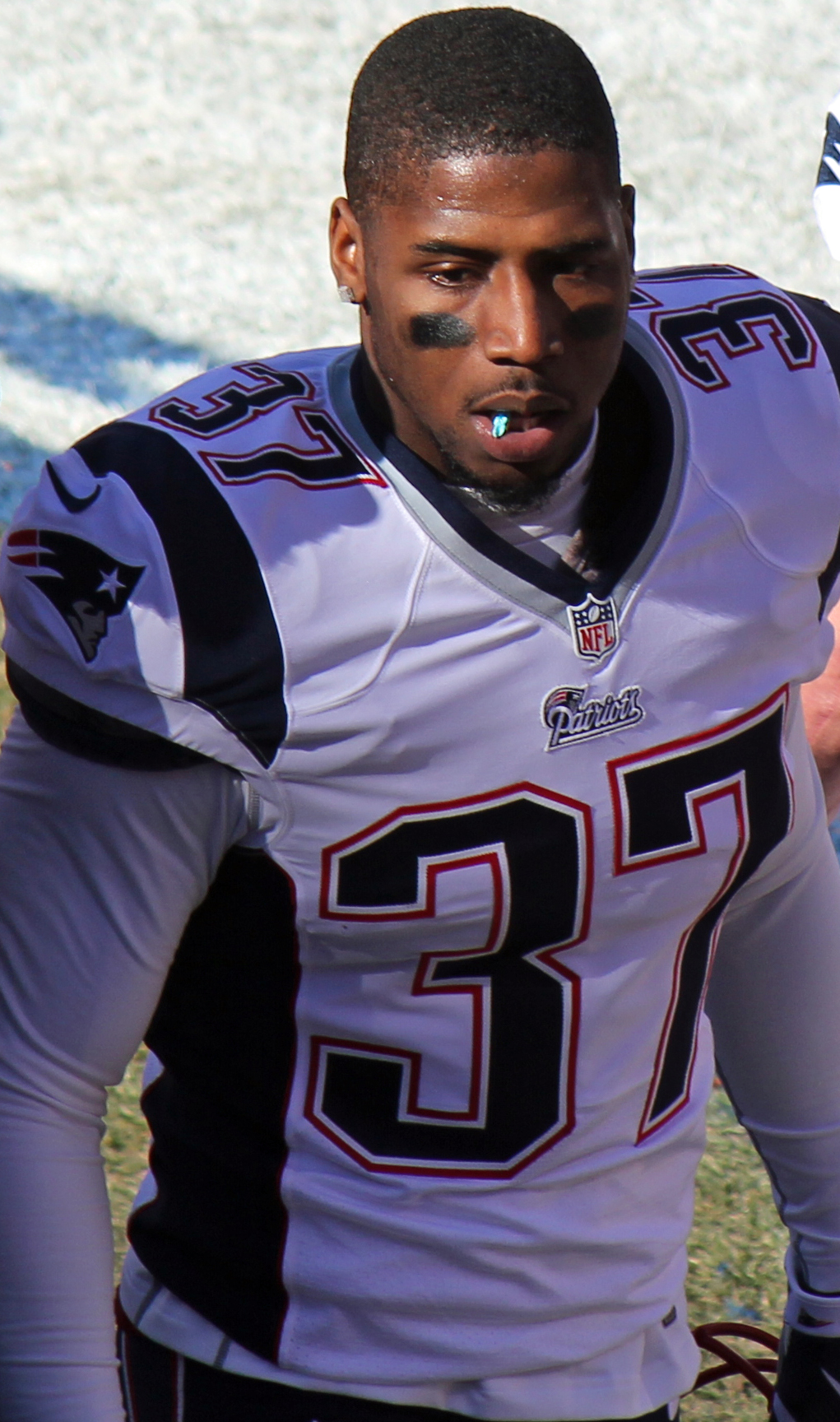
- Dennard with the New England Patriots in 2013

No. 20, 37
- Position: Cornerback

Personal information
- Born: September 9, 1989 (age 37); Rochelle, Georgia, U.S.
- Listed height: 5 ft 10 in (1.78 m)
- Listed weight: 200 lb (91 kg)

Career information
- High school: Wilcox County (Rochelle)
- College: Nebraska (2008–2011)
- NFL draft: 2012: 7th round, 224th overall pick

Career history
- New England Patriots (2012–2014); Arizona Cardinals (2015)*; Baltimore Brigade (2017); Saskatchewan Roughriders (2017)*
- * Offseason or practice squad member only

Awards and highlights
- Super Bowl champion (XLIX); Big Ten Defensive Back of the Year (2011); First-team All-Big Ten (2011); Second-team All-Big 12 (2010)

Career NFL statistics
- Total tackles: 90
- Forced fumbles: 1
- Pass deflections: 16
- Interceptions: 5
- Defensive touchdowns: 1
- Stats at Pro Football Reference

Alfonzo Dennard (born September 9, 1989) is an American former professional football player who was a cornerback for the New England Patriots of the National Football League (NFL). He played college football for the Nebraska Cornhuskers, and was selected by the New England Patriots in the 2012 NFL draft.

== Early life ==
Dennard excelled on both sides of the ball at Wilcox County High School, and was Nebraska's first scholarship player from Georgia since 2001. As a junior, Dennard caught 45 passes for 840 yards and 12 touchdowns, while rushing 24 times for 240 yards and six touchdowns. On defense, he made 60 tackles and had six interceptions. In his senior season, Dennard played a leading role in helping Wilcox County and Coach Mark Ledford to a 13–2 record and state runner-up finish in Class A. Dennard made 53 tackles, while picking off five passes as a cornerback. Offensively, Dennard caught 39 passes for 780 yards and scored 14 touchdowns. He also used his speed to help on special teams, returning two kickoffs and one punt for touchdowns. Dennard received first-team Class A all-state honors from the Georgia Sportswriters Association. Dennard played in the GACA North-South All-Star game. Regarded as a three-star recruit by Rivals.com, Dennard chose Nebraska over North Carolina and Troy, among others.

Dennard was also a contributor in track and basketball. He played point guard in basketball and used his speed in sprint events in track. In 2008, he placed second in the regional meet in the long jump after posting a personal-best leap of 6.68 meters (21 feet, 9 inches), and finished sixth in the state with a leap of 6.50 meters (21 feet, 3 inches).

== College career ==
As a junior in 2010, Dennard started 13 of 14 games and had 31 tackles and four interceptions. He was a second-team all-Big 12 Conference selection. In his senior year in 2011, Dennard was an all-Big Ten first-team selection and earned the Big Ten's Tatum-Woodson Defensive Back of the Year award.

In his final game as a Cornhusker during the Capital One Bowl game, Dennard was ejected at the end of the first half for fighting with South Carolina wide receiver Alshon Jeffery.

College recruiting
Name	Hometown	School	Height	Weight	40^{‡}	Commit date
Dennard, Alfonzo; CB	Rochelle, GA	Wilcox County High School	5 ft 10 in (1.78 m)	185 lb (84 kg)	4.4	Jan 31, 2008
Dennard, Alfonzo; CB	Recruit ratings: Scout: Rivals: (77)					
Overall recruit ranking:
Note: In many cases, Scout, Rivals, 247Sports, On3, and ESPN may conflict in their listings of height and weight.; In these cases, the average was taken. ESPN grades are on a 100-point scale.; Sources: "2008 Team Ranking". Rivals.com.

== Professional career ==
=== Pre-draft ===
Coming out of Nebraska, Dennard was projected to go as high as the first round, but was typically considered to be a second to fourth-round pick by the majority of NFL draft experts and scouts. Prior to the Senior Bowl, Dennard was ranked the third best cornerback prospect by NFL analyst Mike Mayock. He received an invitation to the Reese's Senior Bowl and had a lackluster week of practice due to an injury that prevented him from completing the full week of practices. According to multiple sources, Dennard was exposed while attempting to cover lower rank wide receivers on multiple occasions and was beaten by Iowa receiver Marvin McNutt during practice. Many draft analysts thought he blew any possible chance of being a first-round pick and that his draft stock was immensely affected by questions over his ability to cover wide receivers at the highest level.

External videos
- Dennard's NFL Combine Workout
- NFL Draft Profile: Alfonzo Dennard

He attended the NFL combine, and was unable to perform the bench press, three-cone drill, and short shuttle due to a hip and shoulder injury. On March 8, 2012, Dennard opted to participate at Nebraska's pro day, along with Jared Crick, Lavonte David, Jermarcus Hardrick and Marcel Jones. He was ranked the 11th-best cornerback prospect in the draft by NFL analyst Mike Mayock and was ranked the 12th-best cornerback by NFLDraftScout.com. On April 21, 2012, Dennard was arrested for suspicion of third-degree assault on an officer and another third-degree assault charge only seven days before the 2012 NFL draft after he allegedly punched a police officer outside a bar in Lincoln, Nebraska. This further affected his draft stock and multiple teams removed him from their draft boards. According to Lincoln police, the incident transpired after Dennard was fighting with another man outside a bar at 2:15 a.m. Lincoln police officers responded to the call and attempted to break it up. Dennard then allegedly shoved an officer and then punched him in the face. Lincoln police stated it took four officers to finally restrain Dennard.

Pre-draft measurables
Height	Weight	Arm length	Hand span	40-yard dash	10-yard split	20-yard split	Vertical jump	Broad jump
5 ft 10 in (1.78 m)	204 lb (93 kg)	30 in (0.76 m)	9 1/2 in (0.24 m)	4.55 s	1.61 s	2.64 s	37 in (0.94 m)	10 ft 1 in (3.07 m)
All values from NFL Combine

=== New England Patriots ===
==== 2012 ====
The New England Patriots selected Dennard in the seventh round (224th overall) of the 2012 NFL draft. He was the 29th cornerback selected in the 2012 NFL draft.

External videos
- First Draft: Alfonzo Dennard

On May 17, 2012, the Patriots signed Dennard to a four-year, $2.15 million contract that includes a signing bonus of $14,462.

He competed with Devin McCourty, Kyle Arrington, Ras-I Dowling, Will Allen, and Sterling Moore throughout training camp for the job as the starting cornerback while Aqib Talib served his four-game suspension to begin the season. Dennard suffered a hamstring injury and missed a bulk of training camp, but returned for the last preseason game. Head coach Bill Belichick named Dennard the fifth cornerback on the Patriots' depth chart to begin the 2012 season, behind McCourty, Arrington, Dowling, and Moore.

On October 7, 2012, Dennard made his professional regular-season debut after missing the first four games with a hamstring injury. He made one tackle and deflected a pass as the Patriots defeated the Denver Broncos, 31–21. On October 21, 2012, he earned his first career start and recorded two solo tackles, defended a pass, and made his first career interception on a pass attempt by Mark Sanchez, as the Patriots won, 29–26. The following week, Dennard made five solo tackles, deflected a pass, and intercepted a pass attempt by St. Louis Rams' quarterback Sam Bradford, as the Patriots routed them 45–7.

On November 18, 2012, Dennard collected four solo tackles and two pass deflections, and intercepted a pass from Andrew Luck during a 59–24 victory over the Indianapolis Colts. He returned the interception for an 87-yard touchdown, marking the first and only one of his career. Dennard missed Weeks 16–17 with a hamstring injury after starting seven of the last eight games. He finished his rookie season with 35 combined tackles (34 solo), eight pass deflections, three interceptions, and a touchdown in ten games and seven starts. The New England Patriots finished first atop the AFC East with a 12–4 record and received a playoff berth.

On January 13, 2013, Dennard started his first career playoff game and recorded three combined tackles and a forced fumble during the 41–28 victory over the Houston Texans. The following week, he started in the AFC Championship against the Baltimore Ravens and made two tackles in their 28-13 loss.

==== 2013 ====
Dennard returned to the New England Patriots' training camp and competed with Ras-I Dowling, Kyle Arrington, and Logan Ryan for the starting cornerback role. He was named the starting cornerback, opposite Aqib Talib, to begin the regular season.

He started the New England Patriots' season-opener against the Buffalo Bills and collected three solo tackles and a pass deflection in their 23-21 victory. The next game, Dennard recorded a tackle, a pass deflection, and intercepted a pass attempt by Geno Smith, as the Patriots defeated the New York Jets 13-10. On October 27, 2013, Dennard earned a season-high nine solo tackles during a 27-17 win against the Miami Dolphins. He missed Week 11 with a knee injury and had meniscus arthroscopy a few days after. Dennard recovered in time to play in their Week 12 victory over the Denver Broncos. He finished the 2013 season with a career-high 40 combined tackles (34 solo), eight pass deflections, and an interception. Dennard started nine games and was limited to 13 games after sustaining multiple injuries throughout the season.

The New England Patriots finished first in the AFC East with a 12-4 record. On January 11, 2014, Dennard started in the Patriots' AFC divisional game and recorded two solo tackles, defended four pass, and had two key interceptions off of passes from Indianapolis Colts' quarterback Andrew Luck during the Patriots' 43-22 victory. The following game, he collected three solo tackles as the Patriots' were eliminated from the playoffs after losing 26-16 to the Denver Broncos in the AFC Championship.

==== 2014 ====
He entered training camp in 2014 and faced stiff competition from Darrelle Revis, Kyle Arrington, Brandon Browner, and Logan Ryan for the vacant starting cornerback job left after the departure of Aqib Talib. Head coach Bill Belichick named him the starting cornerback, along with Darrelle Revis, to start the regular season.

Dennard started the New England Patriots' season-opener at the Miami Dolphins and recorded two solo tackles, deflected a pass, and intercepted a pass attempt by Ryan Tannehill, as the Patriots lost 20-33. He went on to miss Weeks 2-4 after sustaining a shoulder injury. On October 12, 2014, he recorded a season-high five solo tackles during the Patriots' 37-22 victory over the Buffalo Bills. The following week, Dennard collected five combined tackles in a 27-25 victory against the New York Jets. A knee injury kept Dennard from playing in Week 8-9 and 11. After having minimal playing time is Weeks 12-13, Dennard missed the remainder of the season with a hamstring injury, including the playoffs and Super Bowl XLIX. He finished the season with 15 combined tackles (13 solo), one pass deflection, and an interception in six games and four starts.

The New England Patriots finished the 2014 season atop the AFC East with a 12–4 record and went on to defeat the Indianapolis Colts 45–7 and then had a 28–24 win over the defending Super Bowl champion Seattle Seahawks.

On May 5, 2015, Dennard was waived by the Patriots. They opted to waive Dennard even though they lost Darrelle Revis, Brandon Browner, and Kyle Arrington in free agency. Multiple off-the-field incidents and injuries during his time with the Patriots were the main factors of his release.

=== Arizona Cardinals ===
On May 6, 2015, Dennard was claimed off waivers by the Arizona Cardinals. The Cardinals released him on July 29, 2015.

=== Baltimore Brigade ===
On January 16, 2017, it was announced that Dennard was among the first five players signed to the Baltimore Brigade of the Arena Football League.

=== Saskatchewan Roughriders ===
Dennard signed with the Saskatchewan Roughriders on April 25, 2017. He was released by the Roughriders on June 12, 2017.

== NFL career statistics ==
Legend
**Bold**	Career high

Year	Team	GP	Tackles				Fumbles			Interceptions					
Year	Team	GP	Cmb	Solo	Ast	Sck	FF	FR	Yds	Int	Yds	Avg	Lng	TD	PD
2012	NE	10	35	**34**	1	0.0	**1**	0	0	**3**	**95**	**32**	**87**	**1**	7
2013	NE	13	**40**	**34**	**6**	0.0	0	0	0	1	0	0	0	0	**8**
2014	NE	6	15	13	2	0.0	0	0	0	1	0	0	0	0	1
Total		29	90	81	9	0.0	1	0	0	5	95	24	87	1	16

== Personal life ==
Dennard's last name is pronounced as DENN-erd. His second cousin Darqueze Dennard was also an NFL cornerback, although Darqueze pronounces his last name de-NARD, due to a family dispute between his parents.

=== Legal troubles ===
On April 21, 2012, Dennard was arrested for felony suspicion of assault on a police officer and felony assault in Lincoln, Nebraska. On February 20, 2013, he was convicted of felony assault on a police officer. On April 11, 2013, he received his sentence for the assault and was sentenced to 30 days in jail beginning on March 1, 2014, and two years of probation. On July 11, 2013, Dennard was arrested on suspicion of a DUI and admitted to this probation violation at a later court hearing. He was scheduled for a sentencing hearing on December 5, 2013. On December 5, 2013, he attended his sentencing hearing for the probation violation in connection with the DUI and was sentenced to an additional 30 days in jail, was, required to perform 100 hours of community service, received an additional year of probation, and was given a "no alcohol" condition. On March 1, 2014, Dennard reported to the Lancaster County Adult Detention Facility in Nebraska to begin serving his 60-day jail term. He served the minimum 35 days and was released after given credit for good behavior and time already served.

On December 15, 2015, it was reported that Dennard had spent five days in Lancaster County Jail after violating the terms of his probation the week prior. He violated the terms after failing tests for alcohol three times in a single month and failed to appear for another drug test.

Dennard was arrested again in Lincoln, NE on February 9, 2022, for alleged third degree assault and domestic violence.
