= Pitts, Georgia =

- City
- Location in Wilcox County and the state of Georgia
- Coordinates: 31°56′43″N 83°32′24″W
- Country: United States
- State: Georgia
- County: Wilcox

Area
  - Total: 0.80 sq mi (2.07 km^{2})
  - Land: 0.80 sq mi (2.07 km^{2})
  - Water: 0 sq mi (0.00 km^{2})
- Elevation: 381 ft (116 m)

Population (2020)
  - Total: 252
  - Density: 314.6/sq mi (121.45/km^{2})
- Time zone: UTC-5 (Eastern (EST))
  - Summer (DST): UTC-4 (EDT)
- ZIP code: 31072
- Area code: 229
- FIPS code: 13-61544
- GNIS feature ID: 0332700
- Website: pittsga.com

Pitts is a city in Wilcox County, Georgia, United States. Per the 2020 census, the population was 252.

== Geography ==
Pitts is located at 31°56′43″N 83°32′24″W (31.945270, -83.540004).

According to the United States Census Bureau, the city has a total area of 0.8 square miles (2.1 km^{2}), all land.

== History ==
The community which later became Pitts began as a settlement in the area of the home of Lyston Clyde Peebles Sr., two miles east of the Alapaha River. Brock Owens and Ashley J. Pitts operated the first store there in the mid-1880s. Pitts was called Kings' Crossing at the time. When application was made for a post office, the Postmaster General preferred a shorter name. J.A. King suggested the name Pitts, in honor of his son-in-law, Ashley J. Pitts. The name was accepted, and the post office was established on 1 November 1888 with Pitts as postmaster.

The Georgia General Assembly incorporated Pitts as a town in 1905.

On April 20, 1921, various people throughout southwest and south-central Georgia observed a meteor trail across the sky which culminated in an explosion and impact at a minimum of four spots slightly north of Pitts. Three fragments of the meteorite were recovered, one falling within a few feet of a child playing outside. It was classified as an iron meteorite. The largest recovered fragment weighed 3.76 kilograms and is currently housed in the Smithsonian Institution Collection. The other fragments remain in private collections. Local accounts and fragments were collected and documented in the Geological Survey of Georgia Bulletin, Issue 29.

== Demographics ==
Historical population
Census	Pop.	Note	%±
1910	279		—
1920	352		26.2%
1930	364		3.4%
1940	371		1.9%
1950	397		7.0%
1960	388		−2.3%
1970	345		−11.1%
1980	384		11.3%
1990	214		−44.3%
2000	308		43.9%
2010	320		3.9%
2020	252		−21.2%
U.S. Decennial Census; 2010 2020

Pitts city, Georgia – Racial and ethnic composition Note: the US Census treats Hispanic/Latino as an ethnic category. This table excludes Latinos from the racial categories and assigns them to a separate category. Hispanics/Latinos may be of any race.
Race / Ethnicity (NH = Non-Hispanic)	Pop 2010	Pop 2020	% 2010	% 2020
White alone (NH)	241	192	75.31%	76.19%
Black or African American alone (NH)	75	54	23.44%	21.43%
Native American or Alaska Native alone (NH)	1	0	0.31%	0.00%
Asian alone (NH)	0	0	0.00%	0.00%
Pacific Islander alone (NH)	0	0	0.00%	0.00%
Other race alone (NH) alone (NH)	0	0	0.00%	0.00%
Mixed race or Multiracial (NH)	1	0	0.31%	0.00%
Hispanic or Latino (any race)	2	6	0.63%	2.38%
Total	320	252	100.00%	100.00%

In 2020, the population was 252, down from 320 in 2010.

== Education ==
The Wilcox County School District holds pre-school to grade twelve, and consists of an elementary school, a middle school, and a high school. The district has 90 full-time teachers and over 1,439 students.

The schools, located in Rochelle, are:

- Wilcox County Elementary School
- Wilcox County Middle School
- Wilcox County High School
