= Pineview, Georgia =

- Town
- Location in Wilcox County and the state of Georgia
- Coordinates: 32°6′36″N 83°30′2″W
- Country: United States
- State: Georgia
- County: Wilcox

Area
  - Total: 1.95 sq mi (5.06 km^{2})
  - Land: 1.95 sq mi (5.05 km^{2})
  - Water: 0.0039 sq mi (0.01 km^{2})
- Elevation: 292 ft (89 m)

Population (2020)
  - Total: 454
  - Density: 232.9/sq mi (89.93/km^{2})
- Time zone: UTC-5 (Eastern (EST))
  - Summer (DST): UTC-4 (EDT)
- ZIP code: 31071
- Area code: 229
- FIPS code: 13-61320
- GNIS feature ID: 0320671

Pineview is a town in Wilcox County, Georgia, United States. Per the 2020 census, the population was 454.

== History ==
A post office called Pineview was established in 1900. The Georgia General Assembly incorporated Pineview as a town in 1902. The community was named for the pine trees which are abundant in the area.

== Geography ==
Pineview is located at 32°6′36″N 83°30′2″W (32.110021, -83.500645).

According to the United States Census Bureau, the town has a total area of 2.0 square miles (5.2 km^{2}), all land.

== Demographics ==
Historical population
Census	Pop.	Note	%±
1910	708		—
1920	474		−33.1%
1930	382		−19.4%
1940	350		−8.4%
1950	310		−11.4%
1960	369		19.0%
1970	528		43.1%
1980	564		6.8%
1990	594		5.3%
2000	532		−10.4%
2010	523		−1.7%
2020	454		−13.2%
U.S. Decennial Census; 2010 2020

=== Racial and ethnic composition ===
Pineview town, Georgia – Racial and ethnic composition Note: the US Census treats Hispanic/Latino as an ethnic category. This table excludes Latinos from the racial categories and assigns them to a separate category. Hispanics/Latinos may be of any race.
Race / Ethnicity (NH = Non-Hispanic)	Pop 2000	Pop 2010	Pop 2020	% 2000	% 2010	% 2020
White alone (NH)	190	171	129	35.71%	32.70%	28.41%
Black or African American alone (NH)	334	334	297	62.78%	63.86%	65.42%
Native American or Alaska Native alone (NH)	0	3	0	0.00%	0.57%	0.00%
Asian alone (NH)	1	0	0	0.19%	0.00%	0.00%
Native Hawaiian or Pacific Islander alone (NH)	0	0	1	0.00%	0.00%	0.22%
Other race alone (NH)	0	0	0	0.00%	0.00%	0.00%
Mixed race or Multiracial (NH)	3	7	8	0.56%	1.34%	1.76%
Hispanic or Latino (any race)	4	8	19	0.75%	1.53%	4.19%
Total	532	523	454	100.00%	100.00%	100.00%

== Education ==
The Wilcox County School District holds pre-school to grade twelve, and consists of one elementary school, a middle school, and a high school. The district has 90 full-time teachers and over 1,439 students.

The schools, located in Rochelle, are:

- Wilcox County Elementary School
- Wilcox County Middle School
- Wilcox County High School

== Notable person ==
- Nick Marshall, Auburn University quarterback
