= Abbeville, Georgia =

- City
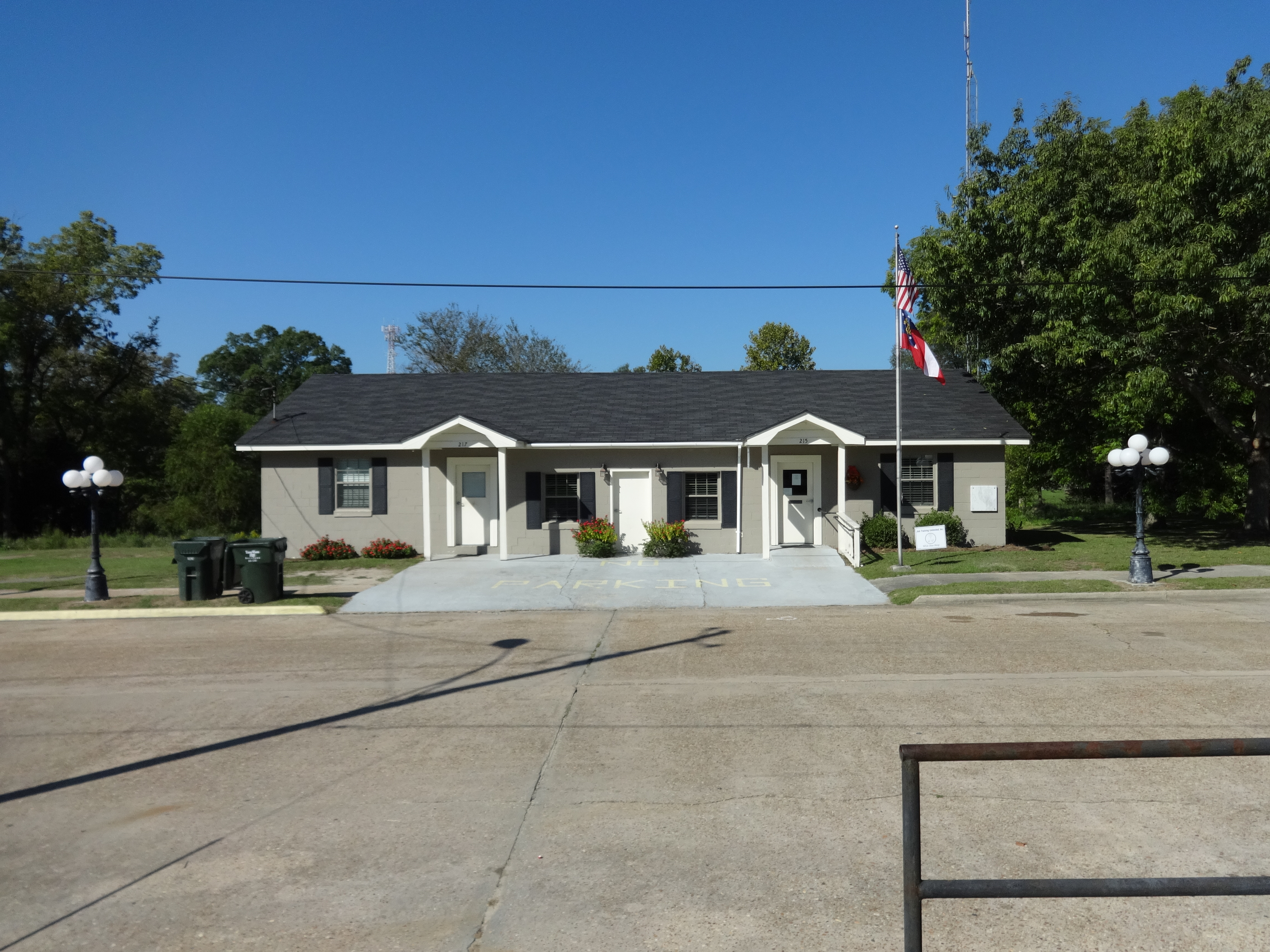
- City hall (2014)
- Nickname: Wild Hog Capitol of Georgia
- Location within Wilcox County and Georgia
- Coordinates: 31°59′30″N 83°18′27″W
- Country: United States
- State: Georgia
- County: Wilcox
- Established: September 15, 1883

Area
  - Total: 3.09 sq mi (8.01 km^{2})
  - Land: 3.06 sq mi (7.92 km^{2})
  - Water: 0.039 sq mi (0.10 km^{2})
- Elevation: 256 ft (78 m)

Population (2020)
  - Total: 2,685
  - Density: 878.4/sq mi (339.17/km^{2})
- Time zone: UTC-5 (Eastern (EST))
  - Summer (DST): UTC-4 (EDT)
- ZIP code: 31001
- Area code: 229
- FIPS code: 13-00184
- GNIS feature ID: 0354256
- Website: abbevillega.org

Abbeville is a city in Wilcox County, Georgia, United States. As of the 2020 census, its population was 2,685. The city is the county seat of Wilcox County.

== History ==
Abbeville was founded in 1857 as seat of the newly formed Wilcox County. The town was incorporated in 1883. According to one tradition, the city was named after Abbie McNally, the wife of the original owner of the site, while another tradition states the name is a transfer from Abbeville, South Carolina.

During the Civil War, Confederate president Jefferson Davis camped at Abbeville on May 8, 1865 during his flight through Wilcox County at the end of the war, two nights before his capture by Union forces in Irwinville. The captured secretary was Francis R. Lubbock, a former governor of Texas, along with Confederate postmaster John H. Reagan, the last treasurer.

The current Wilcox County Courthouse was built in 1903 and it is listed on the National Register of Historic Places.

The Georgia Normal College and Business Institute was established in Abbeville in 1897 before moving to Douglas in 1908.

In 1910 Abbeville had a population of 1,201. In 1950 it had a population of 890.

== Geography ==
According to the United States Census Bureau, the city has a total area of 3.1 square miles (8.0 km^{2}), of which 3.1 square miles (8.0 km^{2}) is land and 0.04 square miles (0.10 km^{2}) (0.65%) is water.

=== Climate ===
Climate data for Abbeville, Georgia
Month	Jan	Feb	Mar	Apr	May	Jun	Jul	Aug	Sep	Oct	Nov	Dec	Year
Mean daily maximum °F (°C)	61.2 (16.2)	61.4 (16.3)	70.6 (21.4)	78.0 (25.6)	84.9 (29.4)	90.2 (32.3)	92.2 (33.4)	91.8 (33.2)	87.5 (30.8)	79.1 (26.2)	69.8 (21.0)	61.2 (16.2)	77.3 (25.2)
Mean daily minimum °F (°C)	34.1 (1.2)	35.6 (2.0)	42.9 (6.1)	49.7 (9.8)	59.4 (15.2)	67.7 (19.8)	70.2 (21.2)	70.4 (21.3)	63.9 (17.7)	52.5 (11.4)	41.7 (5.4)	35.0 (1.7)	51.9 (11.1)
Average precipitation inches (mm)	4.1 (100)	4.4 (110)	4.6 (120)	3.4 (86)	3.4 (86)	4.0 (100)	5.5 (140)	4.5 (110)	3.7 (94)	2.2 (56)	2.7 (69)	3.5 (89)	45.9 (1,170)
Source: Weatherbase

== Demographics ==
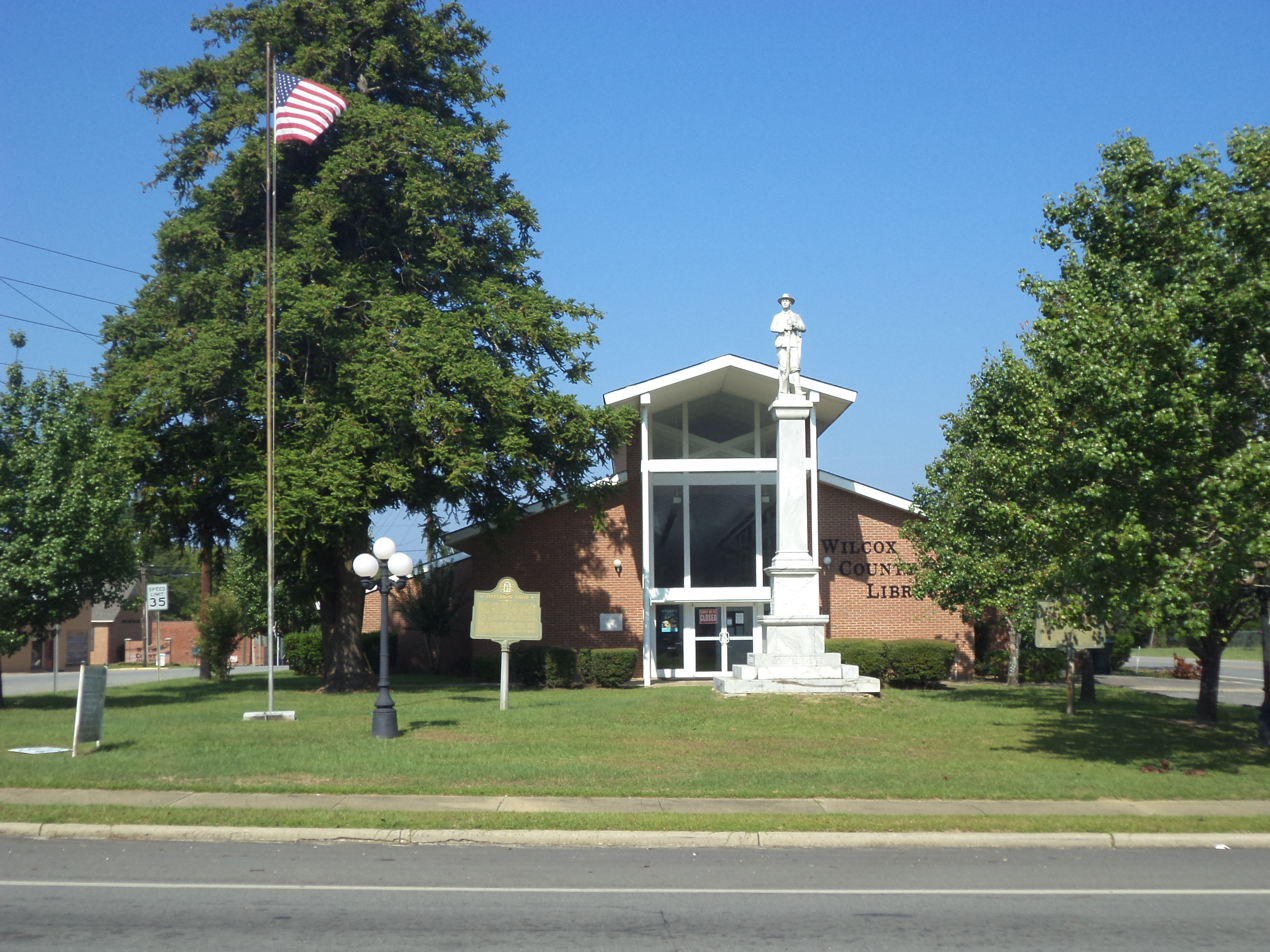
Confederate monument and historic marker to Jefferson Davis at Wilcox County Library in Abbeville City hall

Historical population
Census	Pop.	Note	%±
1880	61		—
1890	657		977.0%
1900	1,152		75.3%
1910	1,201		4.3%
1920	1,119		−6.8%
1930	1,018		−9.0%
1940	1,010		−0.8%
1950	890		−11.9%
1960	872		−2.0%
1970	781		−10.4%
1980	985		26.1%
1990	907		−7.9%
2000	2,298		153.4%
2010	2,908		26.5%
2020	2,685		−7.7%
U.S. Decennial Census; 1860-1870 1880; 1890-1910 1920-1930; 1930-1940 1940-1950; 1960-19801980-2000; 2010 2020

=== Racial and ethnic composition ===
Abbeville city, Georgia – Racial and ethnic composition Note: the US Census treats Hispanic/Latino as an ethnic category. This table excludes Latinos from the racial categories and assigns them to a separate category. Hispanics/Latinos may be of any race.
Race / Ethnicity (NH = Non-Hispanic)	Pop 2000	Pop 2010	Pop 2020	% 2000	% 2010	% 2020
White alone (NH)	941	1,087	943	40.95%	37.38%	35.12%
Black or African American alone (NH)	1,342	1,607	1,639	58.40%	55.26%	61.04%
Native American or Alaska Native alone (NH)	0	2	0	0.00%	0.07%	0.00%
Asian alone (NH)	0	14	8	0.00%	0.48%	0.30%
Native Hawaiian or Pacific Islander alone (NH)	0	0	0	0.00%	0.00%	0.00%
Other race alone (NH)	0	6	0	0.00%	0.21%	0.00%
Mixed race or Multiracial (NH)	6	39	19	0.26%	1.34%	0.71%
Hispanic or Latino (any race)	9	153	76	0.39%	5.26%	2.83%
Total	2,298	2,908	2,685	100.00%	100.00%	100.00%

=== 2020 census ===
As of the 2020 census, Abbeville had a population of 2,685. The median age was 40.7 years. 7.3% of residents were under the age of 18 and 11.3% of residents were 65 years of age or older. For every 100 females there were 412.4 males, and for every 100 females age 18 and over there were 496.6 males age 18 and over.

0.0% of residents lived in urban areas, while 100.0% lived in rural areas.

There were 374 households in Abbeville, of which 30.2% had children under the age of 18 living in them. Of all households, 32.4% were married-couple households, 19.5% were households with a male householder and no spouse or partner present, and 42.0% were households with a female householder and no spouse or partner present. About 33.1% of all households were made up of individuals and 15.2% had someone living alone who was 65 years of age or older.

There were 438 housing units, of which 14.6% were vacant. The homeowner vacancy rate was 2.5% and the rental vacancy rate was 4.6%.

== Arts and culture ==
The Ocmulgee Wild Hog Festival is held annually in May.

== Education ==
Public education is administered by the Wilcox County School District .
