= Wilcox County School District (Georgia) =

School district in Georgia (U.S. state)

Address
- 395 West College Street Abbeville, Georgia, 31001-4231; United States
- Coordinates: 31.990827°N 83.313538°W

District information
- Grades: Pre-school - 12
- Superintendent: Nathan Gibbs
- Accreditations: Southern Association of Colleges and Schools, Georgia Accrediting Commission

Students and staff
- Enrollment: 1,439
- Faculty: 90

Other information
- Telephone: (229) 467-2141
- Website: www.wilcox.k12.ga.us

The Wilcox County School District is a public school district in Wilcox County, Georgia with its board of education in Abbeville. It serves the communities of Abbeville, Pineview, Pitts and Rochelle.

WCS is the largest employer in the county. The district schools are about 111 miles (179 km) east of Columbus, Georgia, 130 miles (210 km) north of Tallahassee, Florida, and 160 miles (260 km) south of Atlanta.

== History ==
Until the late 1950s, each city in Wilcox County had its own school district. As of 2010, Wilcox County has one consolidated school district, the Wilcox County School District.

In 2010, in response to a budget cut, the district announced that for the 2010-2011 school year, school would be in session for four days per week instead of five. School officials said that this would save $100,000 ($147642.3 when adjusted for inflation) per period.

Wilcox County Schools returned to a five-day school week during the 2015-2016 school year.

In 2013, in response to Wilcox County High School students organizing their own integrated private prom after years of private separately organized proms by white and black students, the school district announced that it would hold a school-sponsored integrated prom in 2014.

== Schools ==
The Wilcox County School District has one elementary school, one middle school, and one high school. They are Wilcox County Elementary School, Wilcox County Middle School, and Wilcox County High School. The Board of Education office is located in Abbeville, and all three county schools are located in Rochelle.
