= Rebecca, Georgia =

- City
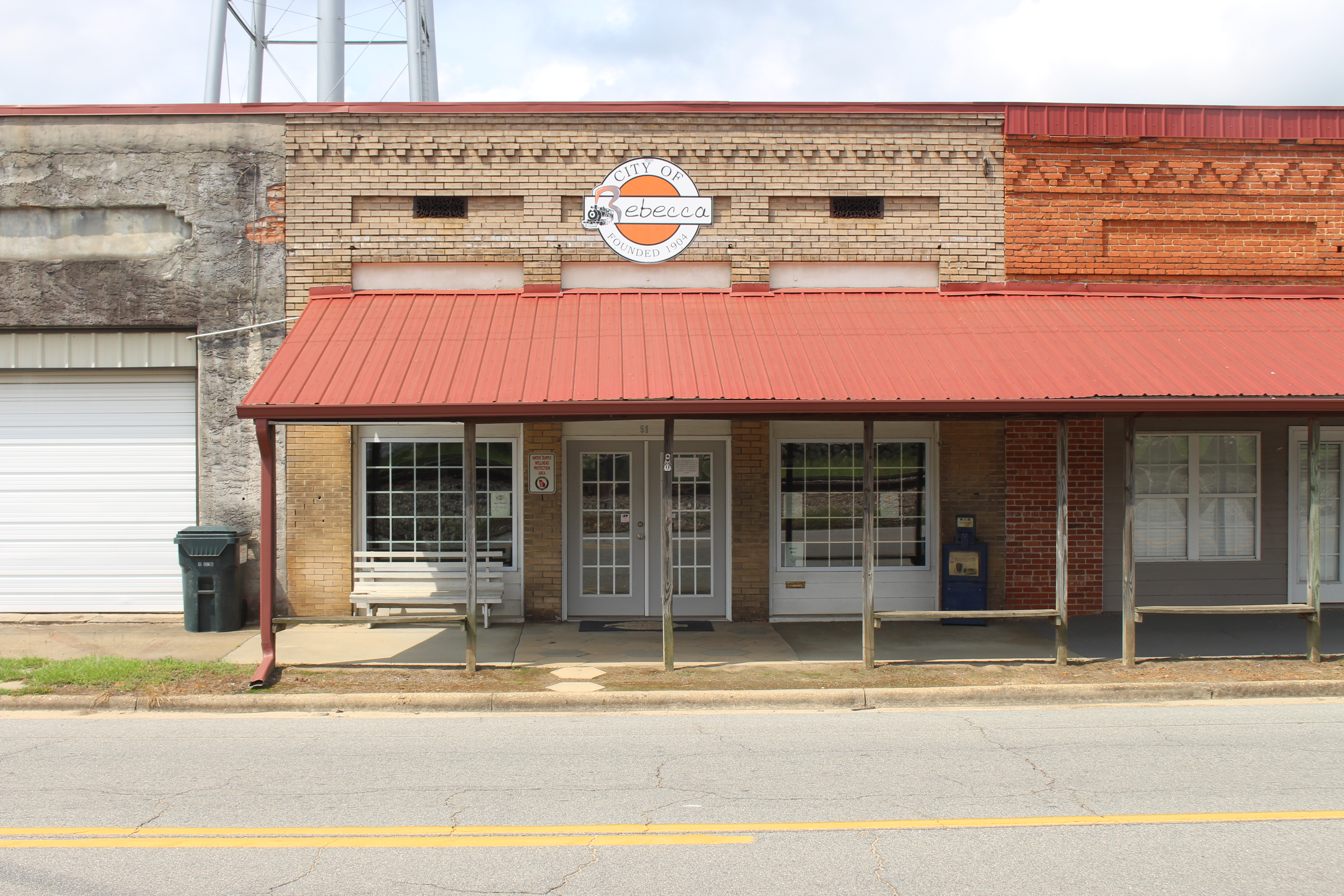
- Rebecca City Hall

- Location in Turner County and the state of Georgia
- Coordinates: 31°48′28″N 83°29′16″W
- Country: United States
- State: Georgia
- County: Turner

Area
  - Total: 0.78 sq mi (2.03 km^{2})
  - Land: 0.78 sq mi (2.03 km^{2})
  - Water: 0 sq mi (0.00 km^{2})
- Elevation: 351 ft (107 m)

Population (2020)
  - Total: 208
  - Density: 264.8/sq mi (102.23/km^{2})
- Time zone: UTC-5 (Eastern (EST))
  - Summer (DST): UTC-4 (EDT)
- ZIP code: 31783
- Area code: 229
- FIPS code: 13-63840
- GNIS feature ID: 0321350

Rebecca is a city in Turner County, Georgia, United States, along the Alapaha River. The population was 208 in 2020.

== History ==
The Georgia General Assembly incorporated Rebecca as a town in 1904. The community was named after Rebecca Sharron, the daughter of a local resident. A post office called Rebecca has been in operation since 1902. The Alapaha Blue Blood Bulldog originated in Rebecca, where they were first bred by the Lane family.

== Geography ==
Rebecca is located at 31°48′23″N 83°29′16″W (31.806385, -83.487833). According to the United States Census Bureau, the city has a total area of 0.8 square miles (2.1 km^{2}), all land.

== Demographics ==
Historical population
Census	Pop.	Note	%±
1910	252		—
1920	331		31.3%
1930	288		−13.0%
1940	342		18.8%
1950	295		−13.7%
1960	278		−5.8%
1970	266		−4.3%
1980	272		2.3%
1990	148		−45.6%
2000	246		66.2%
2010	187		−24.0%
2020	208		11.2%
U.S. Decennial Census

As of the census of 2000, there were 246 people, 87 households, and 66 families residing in the city. The population density was 314.8 inhabitants per square mile (121.5/km^{2}). There were 104 housing units at an average density of 133.1 units per square mile (51.4 units/km^{2}). The racial makeup of the city was 76.42% White, 20.33% African American, 0.81% Native American, and 2.44% from two or more races. Hispanic or Latino people of any race were 0.81% of the population.

There were 87 households, out of which 35.6% had children under the age of 18 living with them, 64.4% were married couples living together, 6.9% had a female householder with no husband present, and 23.0% were non-families. 20.7% of all households were made up of individuals, and 13.8% had someone living alone who was 65 years of age or older. The average household size was 2.83 and the average family size was 3.25.

In the city, the population was spread out, with 28.9% under the age of 18, 7.3% from 18 to 24, 23.6% from 25 to 44, 21.1% from 45 to 64, and 19.1% who were 65 years of age or older. The median age was 37 years. For every 100 females, there were 96.8 males. For every 100 females age 18 and over, there were 90.2 males.

The median income for a household in the city was $31,875, and the median income for a family was $43,125. Males had a median income of $28,125 versus $21,806 for females. The per capita income for the city was $12,881. About 10.0% of families and 15.8% of the population were below the poverty line, including 25.9% of those under the age of eighteen and 15.6% of those 65 or over.
