= Wilcox County Courthouse (Georgia) =

- U.S. National Register of Historic Places
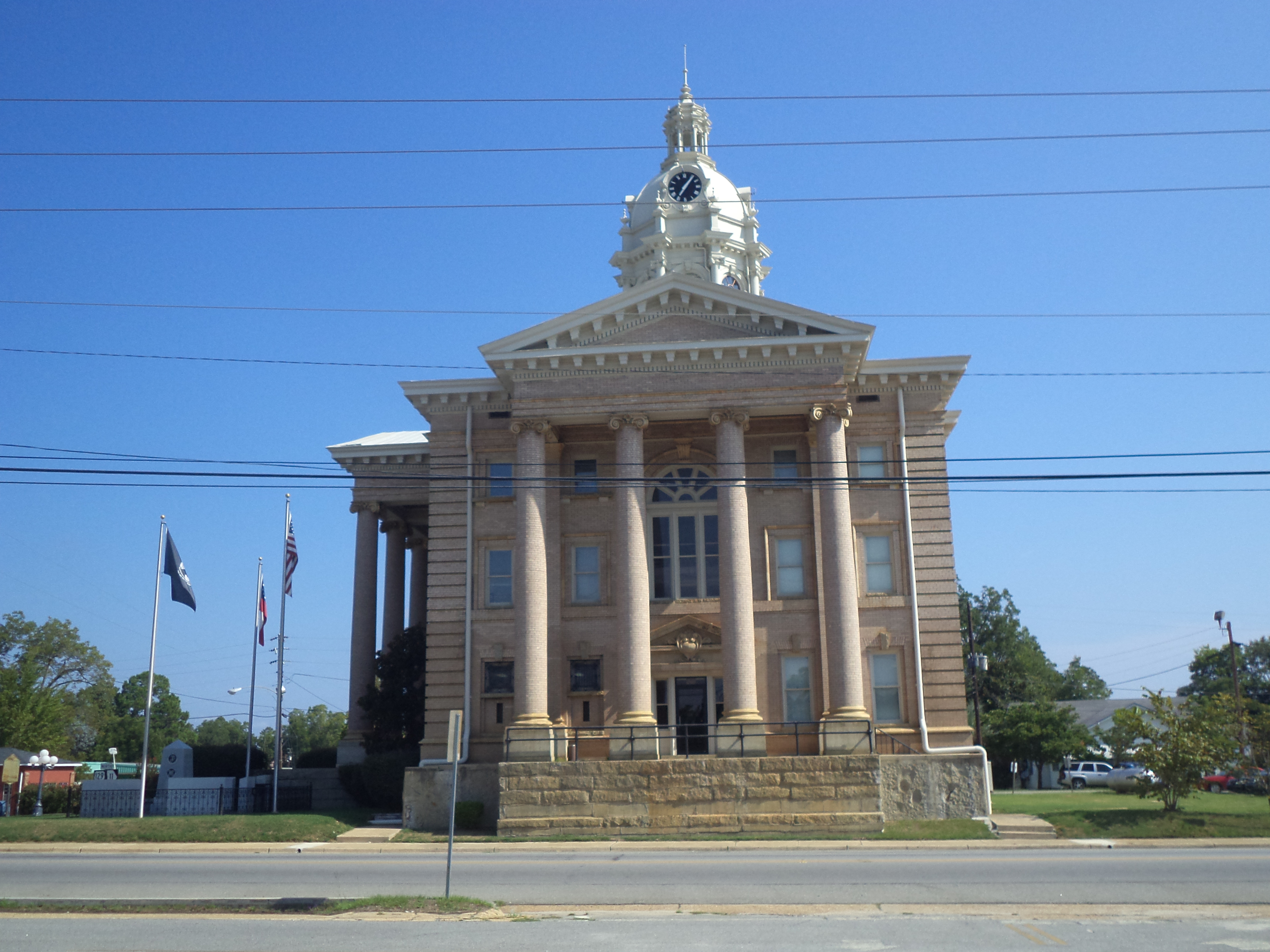

- Location within Georgia Location within the United States
- Location: U.S. 280 and U.S. 129, Abbeville, Georgia
- Coordinates: 31°59′33″N 83°18′24″W
- Area: less than one acre
- Built: 1903
- Built by: McKenzie, J.H.,& Sons
- Architect: Milburn, Frank P.
- Architectural style: Classical Revival
- MPS: Georgia County Courthouses TR
- NRHP reference No.: 80001265
- Added to NRHP: September 18, 1980

The Wilcox County Courthouse in Abbeville, Georgia was built in 1903. It was designed by architect Frank P. Milburn, who also designed several other Georgia courthouses.

Its facade features cream-colored brick and stone trim. It has two Ionic tetrastyle porches.

In 1980, the courthouse building stood out as impressive relative to the surrounding crossroads community of Abbeville, and it could be seen for miles.
