= Rochelle, Georgia =

- City
- Location in Wilcox County and the state of Georgia
- Coordinates: 31°56′56″N 83°27′14″W
- Country: United States
- State: Georgia
- County: Wilcox

Area
  - Total: 1.91 sq mi (4.94 km^{2})
  - Land: 1.91 sq mi (4.94 km^{2})
  - Water: 0 sq mi (0.00 km^{2})
- Elevation: 367 ft (112 m)

Population (2020)
  - Total: 1,167
  - Density: 612.0/sq mi (236.29/km^{2})
- Time zone: UTC-5 (Eastern (EST))
  - Summer (DST): UTC-4 (EDT)
- ZIP code: 31079
- Area code: 229
- FIPS code: 13-66024
- GNIS feature ID: 0321704

Rochelle is a city in Wilcox County, Georgia, United States. Founded in 1887 following the construction of the Americus, Preston, and Lumpkin Railroad through Wilcox County, it was incorporated by the Georgia General Assembly in 1888 and named after La Rochelle, a port city in France. Per the 2020 census, the population was 1,167.

== History ==
The area that would become Rochelle was settled in the early nineteenth century by migrants primarily of Scots-Irish descent moving southward from the Carolinas. The settlement appeared on early maps under the name "Vineyard" before later being referred to as "Center." Modern development began in 1887, when the Americus, Preston, and Lumpkin Railroad established an east-to-west line through Wilcox County, spurring the growth of a new town at the railroad crossing. The Georgia General Assembly incorporated the community as Rochelle in 1888, naming it after La Rochelle, the port city in France. Laid out as a cross-rail community, a town plan centered on the intersection of roads and the railroad line Rochelle grew rapidly, reaching a population of 793 by 1900. Just a decade after its founding, however, a fire destroyed much of the nascent downtown; the city was rebuilt and continued to expand. In 1913, municipal bonds were issued to establish a water supply and electrical system. Cotton remained the dominant crop in the surrounding county through World War I, when a sharp drop in prices, followed by the Great Depression and World War II, dampened the city's growth for several decades.

== Geography ==
Rochelle is located at 31°56′56″N 83°27′14″W (31.948993, -83.453875).

According to the United States Census Bureau, the city has a total area of 1.9 square miles (4.9 km^{2}), all land.

== Demographics ==
Historical population
Census	Pop.	Note	%±
1900	793		—
1910	860		8.4%
1920	1,046		21.6%
1930	1,053		0.7%
1940	1,175		11.6%
1950	1,097		−6.6%
1960	1,235		12.6%
1970	1,380		11.7%
1980	1,626		17.8%
1990	1,510		−7.1%
2000	1,415		−6.3%
2010	1,174		−17.0%
2020	1,167		−0.6%
U.S. Decennial Census; 1850-1870 1870-1880; 1890-1910 1920-1930; 1940 1950 1960; 1970 1980 1990; 2000 2010 2020

=== Racial and ethnic composition ===
Rochelle city, Georgia – Racial and ethnic composition Note: the US Census treats Hispanic/Latino as an ethnic category. This table excludes Latinos from the racial categories and assigns them to a separate category. Hispanics/Latinos may be of any race.
Race / Ethnicity (NH = Non-Hispanic)	Pop 2010	Pop 2020	% 2010	% 2020
White alone (NH)	593	566	50.51%	48.50%
Black or African American alone (NH)	541	549	46.08%	47.04%
Native American or Alaska Native alone (NH)	0	0	0.00%	0.00%
Asian alone (NH)	9	13	0.77%	1.11%
Pacific Islander alone (NH)	0	0	0.00%	0.00%
Other race alone (NH)	0	2	0.00%	0.17%
Mixed race or Multiracial (NH)	3	13	0.26%	1.11%
Hispanic or Latino (any race)	28	24	2.39%	2.06%
Total	1,174	1,167	100.00%	100.00%

=== 2020 census ===
As of the 2020 census, Rochelle had a population of 1,167, down from 1,174 in 2010. The median age was 42.8 years. 21.0% of residents were under the age of 18 and 20.7% of residents were 65 years of age or older. For every 100 females there were 91.6 males, and for every 100 females age 18 and over there were 84.0 males age 18 and over.

0.0% of residents lived in urban areas, while 100.0% lived in rural areas.

There were 481 households in Rochelle, of which 27.7% had children under the age of 18 living in them. Of all households, 36.2% were married-couple households, 18.5% were households with a male householder and no spouse or partner present, and 39.3% were households with a female householder and no spouse or partner present. About 30.1% of all households were made up of individuals and 12.1% had someone living alone who was 65 years of age or older.

There were 574 housing units, of which 16.2% were vacant. The homeowner vacancy rate was 1.2% and the rental vacancy rate was 6.5%.

== Education ==
The Wilcox County School District holds pre-school to grade twelve, and consists of one elementary school, a middle school, and a high school. The district has 90 full-time teachers and over 1,439 students.

The schools, located in Rochelle, are:

- Wilcox County Elementary School
- Wilcox County Middle School
- Wilcox County High School

=== Higher education ===
- Wiregrass Georgia Technical College - Wilcox Learning Center

== Notable people ==
- John Bahnsen - United States Army brigadier general and decorated veteran of the Vietnam War
- Alfonzo Dennard - NFL free agent
- Nick Marshall - NFL cornerback for Jacksonville Jaguars, quarterback for Auburn Tigers
- Bug Howard - NFL tight end for the Tampa Bay Buccaneers
