= Wilcox County High School =

American public high school

Location
- 1358 Hwy 215 South; Rochelle, Georgia 31079; United States; 31.94306°N 83.45237°W

Information
- Type: Public high school
- School district: Wilcox County School District
- NCES School ID: 130573002232
- Principal: Tim Conner
- Teaching staff: 23.50 (on an FTE basis)
- Grades: 9–12
- Enrollment: 340 (2022–2023)
- Student to teacher ratio: 14.47
- Colors: Blue and gold
- Athletics conference: GHSA Class A Public Region 4
- Mascot: Patriot
- Nickname: Patriots
- Website: www.wilcox.k12.ga.us

Wilcox County High School is a public high school in Rochelle, Georgia. United States. It is part of the Wilcox County School District.

== Student culture ==
Historically, students organized separate parties classified as proms; black and white students attended separate parent-organized proms which were not organized by the school administration. In 2012, a black student from the school was voted the Homecoming Queen; however, she did not purchase a ticket to the homecoming dance, but felt that she had been insulted because she was still expected to pay to participate in the privately funded dance. In 2013, students organized the first private racially integrated prom, and the school district announced that it would consider holding a school-sponsored integrated prom in 2014. The first school-organized prom was held in 2014, and the school has held a prom each year since.

== Notable alumni ==
- Alfonzo Dennard (2008), former New England Patriots cornerback
- Bug Howard (2013), Carolina Panthers wide receiver
- Nick Marshall (2011), former Jacksonville Jaguars cornerback
