= U.S. Route 1 in Georgia =

Highway in Georgia

U.S. Highway 1
- US 1 highlighted in red

Route information
- Maintained by GDOT
- Length: 224.861 mi (361.879 km)
- Existed: 1926–present

Major junctions
- South end: US 1 / US 23 / US 301 / SR 15 / SR 4 at the Florida state line northwest of Hilliard, FL
- US 301 / SR 23 on the Folkston–Homeland line; US 82 / US 84 / SR 38 / SR 520 in Waycross; US 23 / SR 19 north of Alma; I-16 in Oak Park; US 80 / SR 26 in Swainsboro; US 319 / SR 78 in Wadley; US 221 / SR 47 in Wrens; I-520 / SR 540 in Augusta; US 78 / US 278 / SR 4 / SR 10 in Augusta; US 25 / SR 121 in Augusta
- North end: US 1 / US 25 / US 78 / US 278 / SC 121 / SR 10 in North Augusta, SC

Location
- Country: United States
- State: Georgia
- Counties: Charlton, Ware, Bacon, Appling, Toombs, Emanuel, Jefferson, Richmond

Highway system
- United States Numbered Highway System; List; Special; Divided; Georgia State Highway System; Interstate; US; State; Special
← SR 1251	→ SR 1

U.S. Highway 1 (US 1) in the U.S. state of Georgia, which is concurrent for almost its entire length with State Route 4 (SR 4), is a highway traversing north–south through portions of Charlton, Ware, Bacon, Appling, Toombs, Emanuel, Jefferson, and Richmond counties in the southeastern and east-central parts of the state. In Georgia, the highway originates at US 1/US 23/US 301/State Road 15 (SR 15) at the St. Marys River and the Florida state line, where SR 4 reach their southern terminus. It travels to the Savannah River at the South Carolina state line in Augusta where the route continues to North Augusta, South Carolina. Here, SR 10 reaches its eastern terminus.

== Route description ==
=== Charlton County ===
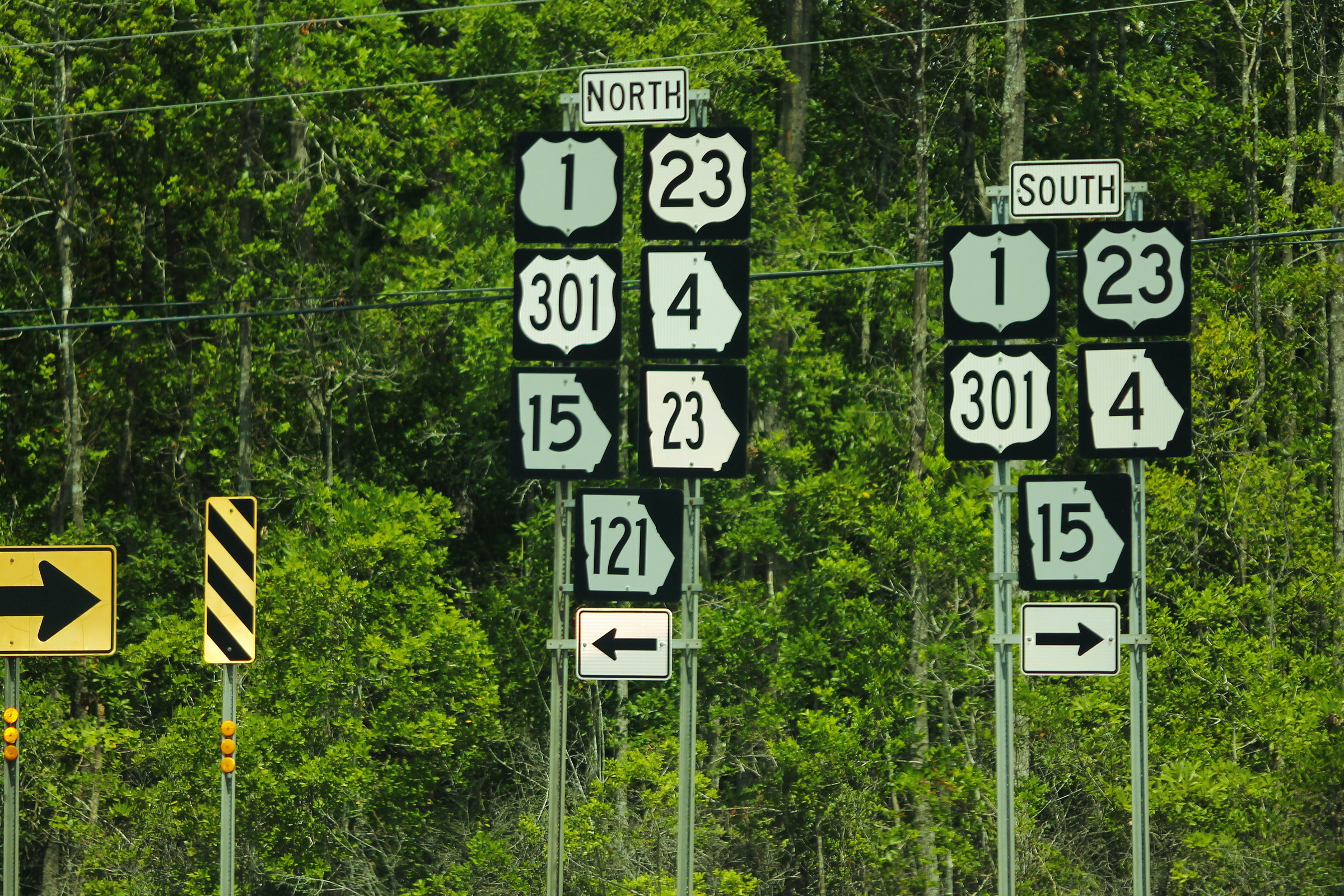
US 1 and six other concurrent routes in Folkston

SR 4 begins at the Florida state line, at a bridge over the St. Marys River, south of Folkston. This is where US 1/US 23/US 301/SR 15 enter Georgia from Florida. US 1, US 23, US 301, SR 4, and SR 15 travel north as the Public Safety and Veterans Highway through rural parts of Charlton County. They curve to the northwest for a brief portion. Just before entering Folkston, where they use the Second Street name. They have an intersection with the southern end of Third Street, a former portion of US 1, they enter the main part of the city. They intersect Main Street. This intersection is just west of the Charlton County Courthouse. One block later is Love Street. Just north of Garden Street, they curve to the northeast. They then intersect SR 23/SR 121, which join the concurrency. This is one of a few seven-highway concurrencies in the state. The seven highways continue north. Just after curving back to the northwest, they intersect SR 40 Connector (SR 40 Conn.; Indian Trail). At this intersection, they pass the Charlton County Library. They then use the Okefenokee Trail as their path. Just north of Robin Lane, US 301 and SR 23 continue to the northeast, while US 1, US 23, SR 4, SR 15, and SR 121 curve to the northwest on the Woodpecker Trail. They cross over some railroad tracks and intersect with the northern end of Dogwood Lane. The highways resume traveling through rural parts of the county. They cross over Little Spanish Creek and then Winding Branch. They intersect the west end of Crews Road and the north end of Old Dixie Highway, a former portion of US 1. Just after this intersection is a crossing over Spanish Creek. They curve north and cross over Melton Branch. Then, in Racepond, SR 15/SR 121 splits off to the northeast, while US 1, US 23, and SR 4 continue to the northwest and enter Ware County.

=== Ware County ===
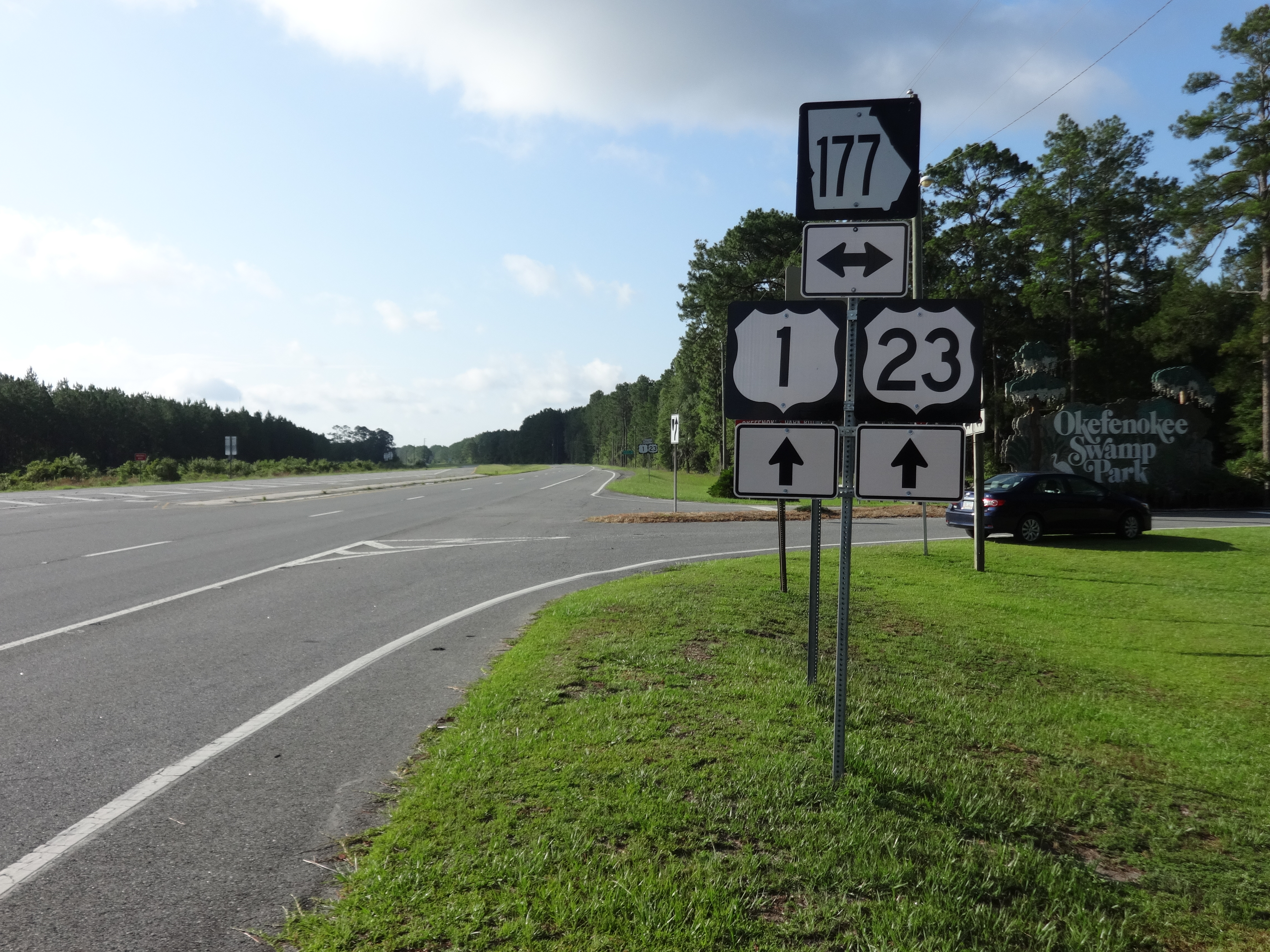
View south along US 1/US 23 at the SR 177 junction just before exiting Ware County

US 1, US 23, and SR 4 cross over Gum Slough and curve more to the northwest. They travel through Fort Mudge and the Dixon Memorial State Forest. They curve to the north and then intersect SR 177. They cross over Mill Creek before entering the southeastern part of Waycross.

Immediately, they pass an office of the Georgia Department of Corrections. Just before an intersection with the western end of Osburn Road, they curve back to the northwest. Just past The Mall at Waycross, they curve to the northwest. Just before an intersection with City Boulevard, they curve back to the north. They intersect the southern end of US 1 Business (US 1 Bus.)/US 23 Bus./SR 4 Bus. (Memorial Drive) and US 82/SR 520 (South Georgia Parkway). US 1/US 23/SR 4 turn left onto US 82/SR 520 and travel concurrently with them. The five-highway concurrency travels to the west. Immediately, they curve to the northwest. An intersection with the southern end of Wilkerson Street leads to Memorial Stadium. The next street is Blackwell Street. Between an intersection with the northern end of Amanda Street and one with Morton Avenue, they cross over the city's drainage canal. An intersection with Lee Street leads to the downtown business district. An intersection with Brunel Street leads to the Obediah Barber Homestead and Swamp Road. At an intersection with Stephenson Street, the five highways curve to the northwest. On this curve, they travel on a bridge over Haines Avenue, some railroad tracks, and US 84/SR 38 (Plant Avenue). Immediately after this bridge, they curve back to the northwest. At McDonald Street, US 84 and SR 38 join the concurrency. The seven highways, US 1, US 23, US 82, US 84, SR 4, SR 38, and SR 520, continue northwest. At an intersection with Nicholls Street, they curve to the west and travel on a bridge over some railroad tracks. Just pass this bridge, they curve to the northwest. At Victory Drive, US 84 and SR 38 depart to the south. Just past this intersection, there is one with South Augusta Avenue. Here, the highways pass South Georgia State College's Waycross campus. Between an intersection with of University Boulevard and one with Anita Street, they leave the city limits of Waycross.

Just west of Anita Street, they curve back to the west. They cross over Kettle Creek. A short distance later, they curve to the northwest. They intersect SR 122 (Carswell Avenue). They curve to the northeast and travel on a bridge over some railroad tracks. Immediately afterward, they travel on a bridge over Albany Avenue. The highways curve to the northwest and come to an intersection with Scapa Road. Here, US 1, US 23, and SR 4 turn right to the northeast, while US 82 and SR 520 continue straight ahead. Almost immediately, they intersect Fulford Road, which leads to the Ware County Sheriff's Office, the Southland Waste Transfer Station, the Ware County Emergency Management Agency, and the Waycross Regional Youth Detention Center. The three highways curve to the north and pass the Waycross–Ware County Industrial Park West. They curve to the northwest for a short distance and then curve to the northeast. They intersect the northern end of US 1 Bus./US 23 Bus./SR 4 Bus. (Alma Highway). The mainline highways head to the northwest and cross over Cox Creek. Almost immediately, they cross over the Satilla River on the Charles Ray King Memorial Bridge and curve north. On a curve back to the northwest, they cross over Dryden Creek. They curve to the north and travel through Dixie Union. They curve to the northeast and travel on a bridge over Crawley Road and some railroad tracks. At an intersection with Jamestown Road and Alma–Waycross Highway, they enter Bacon County.

=== Bacon County ===
US 1, US 23, and SR 4 cross over Little Hurricane Creek on the PFC Clarence Loran Gaskins Memorial Bridge and then curve to the northwest. Upon entering Alma, they pass Bacon County High School Just south of an intersection with Floyd Street and Radio Station Road, they begin a curve to the northeast. Just north of this intersection, they meet the southern end of SR 4 Alternate (SR 4 Alt.; South Dixon Street). North of 17th Street, they pass the Alma campus of Coastal Pines Technical College. The next block is an intersection with SR 32 (16th Street). Just north of 11th Street, the concurrency passes the Alma/Bacon County Public Library. Between 8th and 6th streets, the highways begin a curve to the northwest and pass the Alma Bacon County Welcome Center. They cross over Bear Branch and then meet the western end of Magnolia Drive, which leads to the Alma Bacon County Recreation Department. One block later, they intersect the northern end of SR 4 Alt. (North Dixon Street) and Camellia Drive. Here, they curve to the north. An intersection with Cumberland Road leads to the Bacon County Primary School. A short distance later, they curve to the northeast. They leave the city limits of Alma and cross over Hurricane Creek on the Curtis Lee Marion Bridge. They curve to a due north direction and travel on the Jauquion R. "Rab" Tanner Bridge. The highways curve back to the northeast just before an intersection with the southern end of SR 19. Here, US 23 departs the concurrency on SR 19. US 1 and SR 4 continue to the northeast and cross over Big Satilla Creek and enter Appling County.

=== Appling County ===
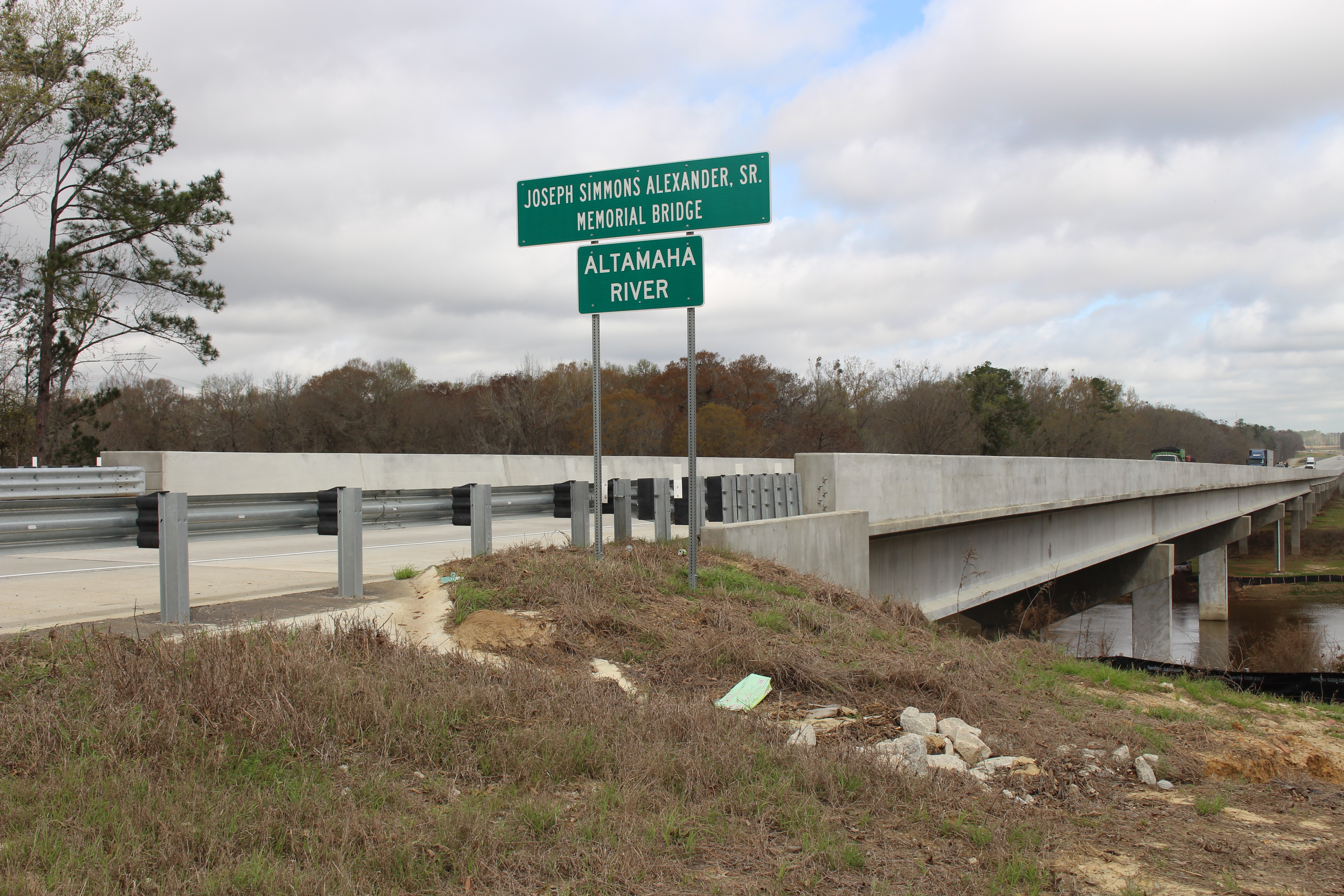
US 1 crossing over the Altamaha River at the Appling–Toombs county line

US 1 and SR 4 continue to the northeast. Just before an intersection with Versie Aldridge Road and Cauley Road, they curve northeast. Just before an intersection with Buck Head Road, they curve back to the northeast. An intersection with Airport Road leads to Baxley Municipal Airport. The highways cross over Blackwater Creek and then curve back to the northeast. They cross over Sweetwater Creek and then enter Baxley. An intersection with Johns Lane leads to Appling County Elementary School. At an intersection with Second Street, they begin a second concurrency with SR 15. An intersection with Bay Street leads to Lake Mayers Public Park. US 1, SR 4, and SR 15 cross over some railroad tracks just before intersecting US 341/SR 27 (Parker Street). Around an intersection with of Ivey Street, the three highways curve to the northwest. At the intersection of Brobston Street, they curve back to the northeast. At an intersection with Sursson Street, they temporarily leave the city limits of Baxley. At the intersection with Nails Ferry Road, they reenter the city. After curving back to the northwest, they leave Baxley for the final time. They cross over Tenmile Creek, curve due north, and cross over Little Tenmile Creek. After crossing over Bay Creek, they cross over an industrial railway. The next intersection with West River Road leads to Deen's Landing, an Altamaha River waterway public landing. They pass a picnic area just before crossing over the Altamaha River on the Joseph Simmons Alexander Sr. Memorial Bridge to enter Toombs County.

=== Toombs County ===
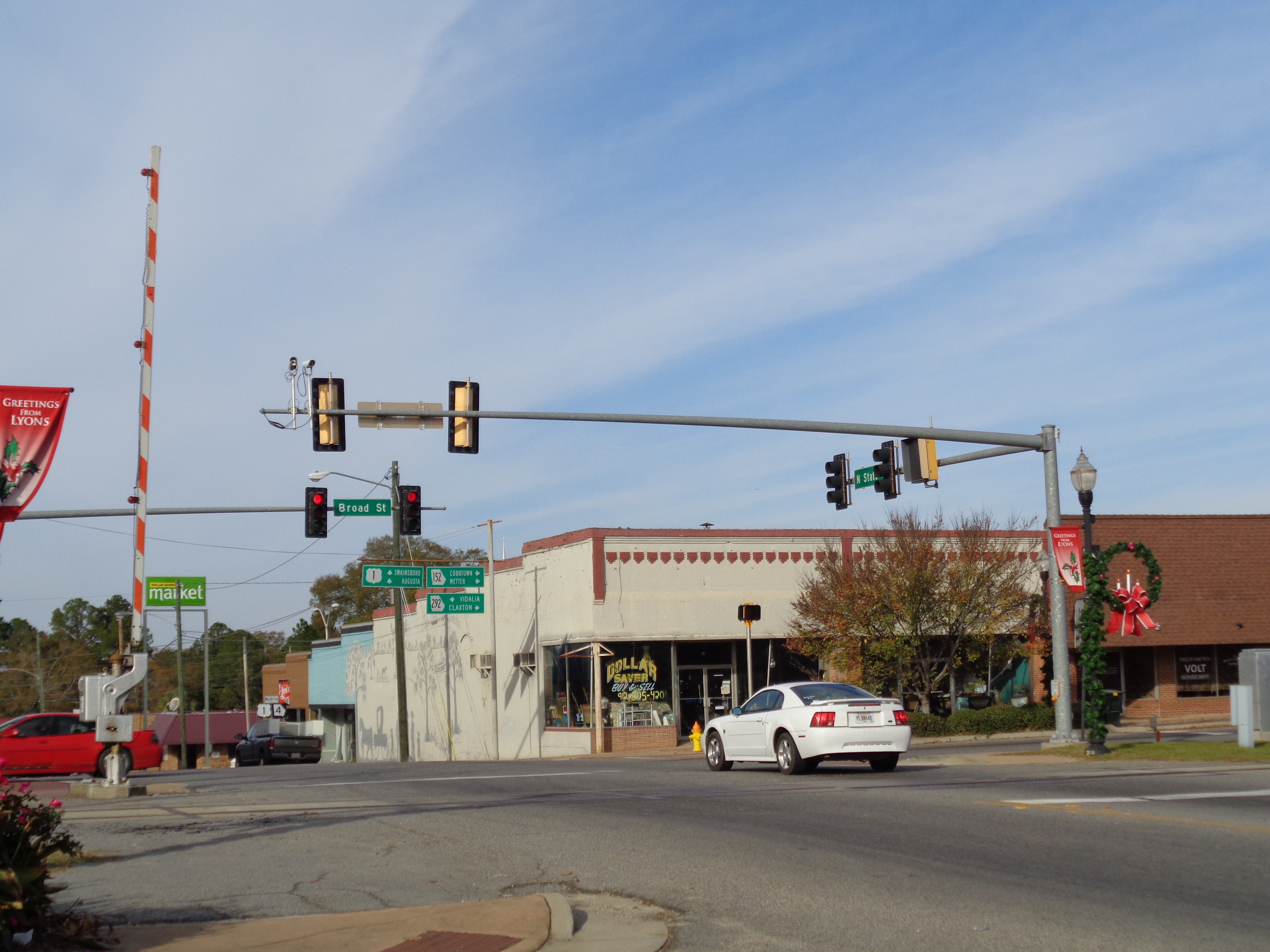
US 1 intersecting SR 152/SR 292 (Broad Street) adjacent to a railroad crossing

US 1, SR 4, and SR 15 continue to the northeast with four-lane construction progressing in the early 2020s. After crossing over Williams Creek, the route enters the unincorporated community of English Eddy. They curve to the northwest. Just before an intersection with SR 147 and Cedar Crossing Road, they curve to a more northern direction. After leaving English Eddy, they curve to the northeast. After crossing over Cobb Creek, a new section of four-lane road continues northeast, away from the old highway, bending back to the northwest to cross SR 56 on the West side of Toombs Central Elementary School and the Toombs County Recreation Department (which are accessed from the former highway) in the unincorporated community of Toombs Central. Shortly afterward, the new section of the highway rejoins the existing highway continuing northwest. In the unincorporated community of South Thompson, they begin a curve back to the northeast. They intersect SR 29. Here, SR 15 splits off onto SR 29. US 1 and SR 4 curve to the northeast and cross over Rocky Creek. They curve back to the northeast and cross over Little Rocky Creek. They then travel through Santa Claus. Approximately 0.7 miles (1.1 km) later, they enter Lyons. They pass Lyons Upper Elementary School and then curve to the northeast. They meet the west end of SR 178 (South Victory Drive). They begin a curve to the northwest. An intersection with South Washington Street leads to Partin Park and the Lyons Recreation Department. They intersect US 280/SR 30 (Liberty Avenue). Just after this intersection, US 1 and SR 4 enter downtown Lyons. They cross over some railroad tracks. Immediately afterward, they intersect SR 292 and SR 152 (Broad Street). After leaving downtown, they pass the Lyons Police Department. Intersections with Cleveland Avenue and Toombs Avenue lead to Toombs County High School's football stadium. Just after leaving Lyons, they cross over Swift Creek and curve to the northeast. They intersect SR 130 and Resmando Road. The roadway curves to the northeast and resumes their northeast direction. They cross over Pendleton Creek and travel through rural areas with agricultural land on both sides of the roadway before entering Emanuel County.

=== Emanuel County ===
US 1 and SR 4 immediately curve to the northwest. Just before Harrell Cemetery Road, they curve back to the northeast. They enter Oak Park. They begin a curve back to the northwest. Immediately after this curve begins, they cross over Reedy Creek. Then, they curve back to the northeast and intersect SR 46/SR 86. Here, SR 46 joins the concurrency. The three highways curve to the northeast and cross over the Ohoopee River. They curve back to the north-northeast and meet a former portion of SR 46. Then, they have an interchange with Interstate 16 (I-16; Jim Gillis Historic Savannah Parkway). Just past this interchange, SR 46 splits off to the east. As of this point, they are known as Bill English Highway. Just after beginning a curve to the northwest, they leave Oak Park. They have an intersection with SR 192 and New Hope Church Road. The concurrency curves back to the northeast and crosses over Jacks Creek. Just south of Ivy W. Rountree Road, they curve back to the north-northeast. Just before curving to the northwest, SR 57 joins the concurrency and then intersect SR 297. Here, they take on the Larry J. "Butch" Parrish Parkway name. They intersect US 1 Bus./SR 4 Bus., which leads to Swainsboro. They briefly enter the city limits of Swainsboro. There, they intersect Empire Expressway and travel on a bridge over some railroad tracks. Just after this, they cross over Crooked Creek. They intersect SR 56 and curve to the northwest. After an intersection with US 80/SR 26 on the southwestern edge of the city, US 1, SR 4, and SR 56 travel just to the west of Holloways Pond. They curve to the northwest, very briefly reentering the city, and then travel just to the west of Emanuel County Airport. They curve back to the northeast and intersect Kight Road, a former segment of SR 57. At this intersection, SR 57 splits off to the northwest. They then meet US 1 Bus./SR 4 Bus. The highways curve back to the northwest. They meet a former portion of US 1 that travels through Dellwood just before intersecting Dellwood Connector, which leads to Dellwood. On the northern side of Dellwood, they meet this former portion of the highway. They curve to a due north direction and then back to the northeast. They travel through the unincorporated community of Blundale. The highways curve to the northwest and then back to the north-northwest. Then, they cross over Rocky Creek to enter Jefferson County.

=== Jefferson County ===
US 1 and SR 4 curve to the northeast and intersect US 1 Bus./SR 4 Bus. and Kennedy Road. They cross over the Williamson Swamp Creek and enter Wadley. Just after a curve to the northwest, they travel on a bridge over some railroad tracks and intersect SR 78 and US 319 (East Calhoun Street). The two highways curve back to the northeast then, back to the northwest, just south of an intersection Martin Luther King Jr. Boulevard and Lincoln Park Road. Just after this curve, they intersect US 1 Bus./SR 4 Bus. They head northeast and cross over Boggy Gut Creek. They intersect Moxley–Bartow Road and Pete Smith Road, the latter of which leads to the unincorporated community of Moxley. In Aldreds, the intersection with Walden Brett Road leads to the unincorporated community of Pine Hill. The concurrency curves due north and meets the northern end of a former portion of US 1 before crossing over the Ogeechee River. They curve to the northwest and enter Louisville. Immediately, they have an intersection with US 1 Bus./SR 4 Bus. and Bob Culvern Road. This intersection is just west of Louisville Municipal Airport. They have an intersection with SR 17 and Midville Road. Here, SR 17 joins the concurrency. They travel just east of Lake Marion and intersect SR 24 (Mulberry Street). Then an intersection with School Street leads to Louisville Middle School. Just before an intersection with Walnut Street and Middleground Road, the roadway begins a curve to the northwest and intersect US 221 and US 1 Bus./SR 4 Bus. (Peachtree Street). Here, US 221 joins the concurrency. The four highways travel due north between the Jefferson County Jail and Law Enforcement Facility and the Louisville Golf Club, passing Thomas Jefferson Academy. They then pass the Jefferson County Health Center and curve to the northwest, intersect Clark Mill By-Pass, which leads to the Jefferson County Landfill. Just north of this intersection, the roadway leaves Louisville. They bend to a northern direction and pass Jones Pond. They curve northeast and intersect SR 296. They pass Jefferson County High School just before intersecting Warrior Trail, which also leads to the Jefferson County Landfill. They pass Adams Lake and then curve to the northeast before crossing over Big Creek. They curve to the north-northwest and then back to a northern direction. They enter Wrens and curve to the northeast. Immediately, they intersect SR 88/SR 540 (Fall Line Freeway), which both join the concurrency. The six highways head into the main part of the city. They cross over some railroad tracks, curve to the northeast and cross over Brushy Creek. They curve to the north-northeast and intersect with Howard Street and Thomson Highway. Here, SR 17 splits off onto Thomson Highway. Then, they intersect SR 80 (Broad Street). Here, SR 88 splits off to the right. The four highways continue northeast and pass Wrens Middle School. The concurrency intersects Quaker Road, which functions as a northern bypass of the city. A short distance later, they intersect SR 47. Here, US 221 splits off to the northwest. US 1, SR 4, and SR 540 cross over Reedy Creek on the Floyd L. Norton Memorial Bridge. An intersection with Woodland Academy Road and Camp Ground Road leads to WCES TV 20. They parallel the southeastern edge of Fort Gordon, then cross over Brier Creek and enter Richmond County and the city limits of Augusta.

=== Richmond County ===
US 1, SR 4, and SR 540 curve to the northeast and cross over Boggy Gut Creek. After curving back to the northeast, they cross over Sandy Run Creek. Then, they curve to the east, before curving to the northeast. The highways leave Augusta, enter the city limits of Blythe, and temporarily leave the edge of Fort Gordon. They intersect Church Street, which leads to Blythe city hall, a U.S. Post Office, and Blythe Elementary School. They begin a curve to the northeast. On this curve, they intersect SR 88 and Hoods Chapel Road. They leave Blythe and reenter Augusta. They curve to the north-northeast and cross over South Prong Creek. The concurrency begins to parallel the southeastern edge of Fort Gordon again and begins to curve back to the northeast. On this curve, they cross over Spirit Creek. This crossing is just south of Gordon Lakes Golf Course. They intersect Willis Foreman Road, which is a connector to US 25/SR 121. This is before an interchange with Tobacco Road, which leads to Fort Gordon's Gate 5. Just after this interchange, they have an intersection with a former portion of US 1. They cross over Butler Creek, meet another former portion of US 1, and curve to the east-northeast to an intersection with Meadowbrook Drive and Barton Chapel Road. The roadway begins a curve back to the northeast. At an interchange with I-520 (Bobby Jones Expressway; and its unsigned companion designation SR 415), both SR 540 and the Fall Line Freeway end. US 1 and SR 4 pass Augusta Technical College and then intersect Lumpkin Road, which functions as a bypass south of the main part of Augusta. They then meet Wheeless Road, which helps connect the southern and central parts of the city. They pass Hillcrest Memorial Cemetery before meeting Richmond Hill Road. They cross over Rocky Creek just before intersecting US 78/US 278/SR 10 (Gordon Highway). Here, US 1 turns right onto Gordon Highway, while SR 4 continues into the heart of the city. The four highways curve slightly to the east-northeast to an interchange with US 25/SR 121 (Peach Orchard Road), which both join the concurrency. The six highways take Gordon Highway to the northeast and intersect Doug Barnard Parkway (former SR 56 Spur) and Molly Pond Road. Gordon Highway curves to the north-northeast and intersects Laney Walker Boulevard, entering downtown. It travels just to the northwest of Magnolia Cemetery, Cedar Grove Cemetery, and May Park and southeast of James Brown Arena. A short distance later, they travel to the east of Old Medical College and the Old Government House, then have an interchange with US 25 Bus./SR 28 (Broad Street). Here, US 25 Bus. meets its end. Just after this interchange, the highway crosses over the Savannah River into South Carolina. At the state line, SR 10, and Gordon Highway end, while US 1, US 25, US 78, and US 278, concurrent with South Carolina Highway 121 (SC 121) travel on the Jefferson Davis Highway to the northeast toward North Augusta.

=== National Highway System ===
The entire length of US 1 is part of the National Highway System, a system of routes determined to be the most important for the nation's economy, mobility, and defense.

== History ==
=== 1920s ===
The roadway that would eventually become US 1/SR 4 was designated at least as early as 1919 as part of SR 15 from the Florida state line to Alma, an unnumbered road from Alma to Baxley, part of SR 17 from Swainsboro to Louisville, and another unnumbered road from Louisville to Augusta. By the end of 1921, SR 32 was proposed on the Alma–Baxley segment. SR 17 was proposed on the Baxley–Swainsboro segment. The portion of SR 24 east of Louisville was shifted northwestward on the previously unnumbered road from Louisville to Augusta. Also, the portion of SR 17 north of Louisville was shifted eastward onto that same road from Louisville to Wrens. By the end of 1926, US 1 was designated on the entire Florida-to-Augusta path. SR 32 was designated from a point north-northeast of Alma to Lyons. SR 17 was designated from Baxley to Wrens. US 78/SR 10/SR 12 was designated from a point west-southwest of Augusta into that city. Three segments of US 1 had a "completed hard surface": a segment south-southeast of the Charlton–Brantley county line, from a point southeast of Waycross into that city, and from a point southwest of Augusta into that city. Two segments had a "completed semi hard surface": from the Florida state line to a point south-southeast of the Charlton–Brantley county line and from just south-southeast of this county line to southeast of Waycross. Two segments had a "sand clay or top soil" surface: from just south of the Ware–Bacon county line to Alma and from the Emanuel–Jefferson county line to Louisville. Four segments were indicated to be under construction: from Waycross to just south of the Ware–Bacon county line, from Alma to Baxley, from Swainsboro to the Emanuel–Jefferson county line, and from Louisville to southwest of Augusta. By the end of 1929, SR 4 was designated from Florida to Augusta. SR 32 was truncated off of US 1 at Alma. SR 24's portion east of Louisville was shifted back to its former routing, off of US 1. SR 17 was truncated off of US 1 at Wrens.

=== 1930s and 1940s ===
By the middle of 1930, SR 15 was truncated to a point north-northeast of Alma. The entire highway, from the Florida state line to Augusta, had a completed hard surface. In January 1932, SR 17 was placed on a concurrency with US 1/SR 4 from Louisville to a point about halfway between Louisville and Wrens. In 1937, the entire segment from the Florida state line to Waycross was indicated to be under construction. By the end of the year, US 1/US 78/SR 4/SR 10/SR 12 were indicated to have entered the main part of Augusta on Milledgeville Road; they intersected US 25/SR 121 (Savannah Road); all seven highways traveled on Twiggs Street and 7th Street to an intersection with SR 28 (Broad Street); US 1/US 78/SR 4/SR 10/SR 12/SR 28 traveled east-southeast on Broad Street to an intersection with 5th Street; and US 1/US 78/SR 4/SR 10/SR 12 traveled on 5th Street to the South Carolina state line. By the end of 1939, SR 57 was placed on a concurrency with US 1/SR 4 from north of Oak Park to Swainsboro. In 1940, the northern end of the SR 17 concurrency was shifted northward to Wrens. By February 1948, US 301 was placed on a concurrency from the Florida state line to Folkston.

=== 1950s ===
By August 1950, US 23 was placed on a concurrency from the Florida state line to a point north of Alma. Between September 1953 and June 1954, US 221 was placed on a concurrency from Louisville to Wrens. By June 1955, Gordon Highway was established around the southwest side of Augusta and proposed to the 5th Street/Gwinnett Street intersection. It began on US 78/SR 10/SR 12 (with US 278 newly designated on it) west-southwest of Augusta to US 25/SR 121 south of the city. No numbered highways were indicated to be designated on it, so US 1/SR 4 remained on its previous path. It had an interchange with US 25/SR 21. US 1/US 78/SR 4/SR 10/SR 12 split off of the US 78/US 278/SR 10/SR 12 concurrency just north-northeast of Gwinnett Street, where US 278 reached its eastern terminus. It traveled north-northeast to Calhoun Street, east-southeast to 5th Street, and resumed its 5th Street path, albeit on a more southern starting point. By the middle of 1957, Gordon Highway was completed around the southern and eastern sides of Augusta to 5th Street just north-northeast of Gwinnett Street in the city. US 1/US 25/US 78/US 278 was shifted onto the highway, with SR 4/SR 12 and possibly SR 10 remaining on Milledgeville Road, Twiggs Street, 7th Street, and Broad Street.

=== 1960s ===
By June 1960, SR 15 was shifted eastward, onto a completely different alignment. It had two different concurrencies with US 1/SR 4: from the Florida state line to Racepond and from Baxley to South Thompson. In Augusta, SR 10 was shifted off of SR 4 and onto Gordon Highway. SR 21 was extended onto the SR 4/SR 12 concurrency on Twiggs Street and 7th Street. SR 21 reached its northern terminus at Broad Street. US 25 was shifted off of Broad Street and onto Gordon Highway, which was extended to the South Carolina state line. Its former path was redesignated as part of US 25 Bus. By June 1963, SR 121 was placed on a concurrency from Folkston to Racepond. By the end of 1965, a western bypass of Waycross was built from US 82/SR 50 west-northwest of the city to US 1/US 23/SR 4 northwest of it. SR 21 was extended west-northwest on US 25 Bus./SR 28 (Broad Street) and followed the business route to the South Carolina state line. SR 121 was extended on Gordon Highway from the US 25/SR 21/SR 121 interchange to the state line. Also, the intersection of Gordon Highway and Broad Street was converted into an interchange.

=== 1970s to present ===
In 1976, SR 4 Spur was extended around the southwestern and southern edges of Alma to US 1/SR 4 in the southern part of the city. In 1978, a southern bypass of Waycross, designated as SR 714, was established with a "topsoil or gravel" surface from SR 122 west-southwest of the city to US 84/SR 38 southwest of it. It was also proposed from that intersection southeast, east, and northeast to US 1/US 23/SR 4 east-southeast of the city. In 1980, SR 4 Spur was redesignated as SR 4 Alt. The next year, SR 12's eastern terminus was truncated to Thomson. SR 21's northern terminus was truncated to Millen. SR 4's Milledgeville Road portion was truncated to the 15th Street intersection. It was routed on 15th Street and Walton Way and then resumed its 13th Street path, just with a more southerly starting point. In 1982, SR 714 was proposed to be extended west-northwest just north of the path of US 82/SR 50. In 1985, US 82/SR 50 through Waycross were rerouted, replacing all of SR 714's actual and proposed segments. In 1992, a western bypass of Waycross, designated as SR 896, was proposed from US 82/SR 520 west-northwest of the city to US 1/US 23/SR 4 northwest of it. In 1996, US 1/US 23/SR 4 was rerouted in the southern part of Waycross and north-northwest on the path of SR 896. Their former path became US 1 Bus./US 23 Bus./SR 4 Bus. In 2003, a western bypass of Swainsboro was proposed. The next year, US 1/SR 4 was shifted onto this bypass. Their former path through the city became US 1 Bus./SR 4 Bus.

== Future ==
The portion from the southern part of Wrens to the central part of Augusta is part of the Fall Line Freeway, a highway that connects Columbus and Augusta. This portion may eventually be incorporated into the proposed eastern extension of I-14, which is currently entirely within Central Texas and may be extended into Augusta.

=== Widening project (Wadley to Wrens) ===
The Georgia Department of Transportation (GDOT) will widen 21 miles (34 km) of US 1/SR 4 from north of Wadley to Wrens and will be a total of $17 million in budget. This project will widen US 1/SR 4 from two lanes to a four-lane road (each having 11 feet [3.4 m] in width). Currently, GDOT has an ongoing plan to widen all of US 1/SR 4 to four lanes (with bypasses) with more than half of it complete. In a few years, it will be complete, and they will move on to the next phase. This project will be completed on September 30, 2022.

== Major intersections ==
County	Location	mi	km	Destinations	Notes
St. Marys River		0.000	0.000	US 1 south / US 23 south / US 301 south (SR 15 south) / SR 4 begins – Hilliard, Jacksonville	Southern end of SR 4 concurrency; GA SR 15 continues as FL SR 15 at the state line; continuation into Florida
Charlton		2.666	4.291	Third Street north	Southern terminus of Third Street; former US 1 north
Charlton	Folkston	4.201	6.761	SR 40 east (Main Street) to I-95 – Kingsland, Okefenokee National Wildlife Refuge	Western terminus of SR 40
Charlton	Folkston	4.275	6.880	Love Street	Former SR 252 east
Charlton	Folkston	4.678	7.529	SR 23 south / SR 121 south – St. George	Southern end of SR 23 and SR 121 concurrencies
Charlton	Folkston	5.044	8.118	SR 40 Conn. east (Indian Trail) – Kingsland, White Oak, Charlton County High School, D. Ray James Prison	Western terminus of SR 40 Conn.; provides access to Charlton Family Care
Charlton	Homeland	6.772	10.898	US 301 north / SR 23 north – Jesup	Northern end of US 301 and SR 23 concurrencies; interchange
Charlton		12.367	19.903	Crews Road north / Old Dixie Highway south	Southern terminus of Crews Road; northern terminus of Old Dixie Highway; former US 1 south
Charlton	Racepond	18.755	30.183	SR 15 north / SR 121 north – Blackshear	Northern end of SR 15 and SR 121 concurrencies
Ware		30.924	49.767	SR 177 – Okefenokee Swamp Park, Laura S. Walker State Park and Golf Course	
Ware	Waycross	37.742	60.740	US 82 east / SR 520 east (South Georgia Parkway) / US 1 Bus. north / US 23 Bus. north / SR 4 Bus. north (Memorial Drive) – Alma, Brunswick	Southern end of US 82/SR 520 concurrency; southern terminus of US 1 Bus./US 23 Bus./SR 4 Bus.
Ware	Waycross	39.219	63.117	US 84 / SR 38	
Ware	Waycross	39.418	63.437	US 84 east / SR 38 east (McDonald Street) – Blackshear, Jesup, Savannah	Eastern end of US 84/SR 38 concurrency
Ware	Waycross	40.584	65.314	US 84 west / SR 38 west (Victory Drive) – Valdosta, Coastal Pines Technical College, Ware County High School	Western end of US 84/SR 38 concurrency
Ware		42.691	68.705	SR 122 west (Carswell Avenue) – Lakeland	Eastern terminus of SR 122
Ware		45.005	72.429	US 82 west / SR 520 west – Pearson	Northern end of US 82/SR 520 concurrency
Ware		49.069	78.969	US 1 Bus. south / US 23 Bus. south / SR 4 Bus. south (Alma Highway) – Waycross–Ware County Airport	Northern terminus of US 1 Bus./US 23 Bus./SR 4 Bus.
Bacon	Alma	66.727	107.387	SR 4 Alt. north (South Dixon Street)	Southern terminus of SR 4 Alt.
Bacon	Alma	67.164	108.090	SR 32 (16th Street) – Douglas, Patterson	
Bacon	Alma	68.275	109.878	SR 4 Alt. south (North Dixon Street) / Camellia Drive east	Northern terminus of SR 4 Alt.; western terminus of Camellia Drive
Bacon		73.499	118.285	US 23 north / SR 19 north – Hazlehurst	Northern end of US 23 concurrency; southern terminus of SR 19
Appling	Baxley	84.903	136.638	SR 15 south / Second Street west – Bristol	Southern end of SR 15 concurrency; eastern terminus of Second Street
Appling	Baxley	85.961	138.341	US 341 / SR 27 (Parker Street) – Hazlehurst, Jesup, Coastal Pines Technical College	
Appling	Baxley	86.182	138.696	North Main Street north – Glennville	Southern terminus of North Main Street; former SR 144 east
Altamaha River		97.314	156.612	Joseph Simmons Alexander Sr. Memorial Bridge	
Toombs	English Eddy	99.432	160.020	SR 147 east / Cedar Crossing Road west – Reidsville	Western terminus of SR 147; eastern terminus of Cedar Crossing Road
Toombs	Toombs Central	105.101	169.144	SR 56 – Uvalda, Reidsville, Gordonia-Alatamaha State Park & Golf Course	
Toombs	South Thompson	109.381	176.032	SR 15 north / SR 29 north – Vidalia	Northern end of SR 15 concurrency; southern terminus of SR 29
Toombs	Lyons	115.851	186.444	SR 178 east (South Victory Drive) – Georgia State Prison	Western terminus of SR 178
Toombs	Lyons	116.753	187.896	US 280 / SR 30 (Liberty Avenue) – Vidalia, Reidsville, Southeastern Tech	Provides access to Meadows Regional Medical Center
Toombs	Lyons	116.851	188.053	SR 152 east / SR 292 (Broad Street) – Vidalia, Cobbtown, Metter, Claxton	Western terminus of SR 152
Toombs	Lyons	119.848	192.877	SR 130 west / Resmando Road east – Vidalia	Eastern terminus of SR 130; western terminus of Resmando Road
Emanuel	Oak Park	129.308	208.101	SR 46 west / SR 86 – Ohoopee, Soperton	Southern end of SR 46 concurrency
Emanuel	Oak Park	131.319	211.337	Old Highway 46 east	Western terminus of Old Highway 46; former SR 46 east
Emanuel	Oak Park	131.743	212.020	I-16 (Jim L. Gillis Highway / SR 404) – Macon, Savannah	I-16 exit 90
Emanuel	Oak Park	131.951	212.355	SR 46 east – Metter	Northern end of SR 46 concurrency
Emanuel		134.416	216.322	SR 192 east / New Hope Church Road north – Stillmore	Western terminus of SR 192; southern terminus of New Hope Church Road
Emanuel		140.561	226.211	SR 57 east – Stillmore	Southern end of SR 57 concurrency
Emanuel		141.691	228.030	SR 297 south – Nunez	Northern terminus of SR 297
Emanuel		142.063	228.628	US 1 Bus. north / SR 4 Bus. north – Swainsboro, East Georgia State College	Southern terminus of US 1 Bus./SR 4 Bus.
Emanuel		145.556	234.250	SR 56 – Soperton, Swainsboro	
Emanuel	Swainsboro	146.382	235.579	US 80 / SR 26 – Dublin, Swainsboro	Provides access to Emanuel Medical Center
Emanuel		149.074	239.911	SR 57 west / Kight Road south – Wrightsville, Swainsboro, Swainsboro Tech	Northern end of SR 57 concurrency; northern terminus of Kight Road; provides access to Emanuel County Airport
Emanuel		150.813	242.710	US 1 Bus. south / SR 4 Bus. south – Swainsboro	Northern terminus of US 1 Bus./SR 4 Bus.
Jefferson		165.489	266.329	US 1 Bus. north / SR 4 Bus. north / Kennedy Road south – Wadley	Southern terminus of US 1 Bus./SR 4 Bus.; northern terminus of Kennedy Road
Jefferson	Wadley	167.172	269.037	US 319 south / SR 78 (East Calhoun Street) – Bartow, Midville	Northern terminus of US 319
Jefferson		168.921	271.852	US 1 Bus. south / SR 4 Bus. south – Wadley	Northern terminus of US 1 Bus./SR 4 Bus.
Jefferson	Louisville	175.533	282.493	US 1 Bus. north / SR 4 Bus. north – Louisville	Southern terminus of US 1 Bus./SR 4 Bus.
Jefferson	Louisville	176.191	283.552	SR 17 south – Midville	Southern end of SR 17 concurrency; provides access to Louisville Municipal Airport
Jefferson	Louisville	176.731	284.421	SR 24 (Mulberry Street) – Louisville, Waynesboro	
Jefferson	Louisville	177.619	285.850	US 1 Bus. south / US 221 south / SR 4 Bus. south (Peachtree Street) – Louisville, Bartow	Southern end of US 221 concurrency; northern terminus of US 1 Bus./SR 4 Bus.; provides access to intercity bus station and Jefferson Hospital
Jefferson		181.336	291.832	SR 296 north – Stapleton	Southern terminus of SR 296
Jefferson	Wrens	190.323	306.295	SR 540 west (Fall Line Freeway west) – Sandersville	Southern end of SR 540 concurrency
Jefferson	Wrens	191.502	308.193	SR 17 north (Thomson Highway) / Howard Street east – Thomson	Northern end of SR 17 concurrency; western terminus of Howard Street
Jefferson	Wrens	191.762	308.611	SR 80 / SR 88 east (Broad Street) to SR 17 / SR 102 – Warrenton, Waynesboro, Matthews, Keysville, Blythe, Avera, Thomson	Western terminus of SR 88
Jefferson	Wrens	192.751	310.203	US 221 north / SR 47 west – Harlem, Appling	Northern end of US 221 concurrency; eastern terminus of SR 47; provides access to Wrens Municipal Airport
Richmond	Blythe	205.355	330.487	SR 88 / Hoods Chapel Road north – Blythe, Hephzibah	Southern terminus of Hoods Chapel Road
Richmond	Augusta	213.171	343.065	Tobacco Road – Fort Gordon, Signal Corps Museum, Bush Field	Interchange
Richmond	Augusta	217.253	349.635	I-520 (Bobby Jones Expressway / SR 415) / SR 540 ends (Fall Line Freeway) – Columbia, Atlanta	Eastern terminus of SR 540; northern end of SR 540 concurrency; I-520 exit 5; Henry L. Howard Memorial Interchange
Richmond	Augusta	219.549	353.330	US 78 west / US 278 west / SR 10 west (Gordon Highway) / SR 4 north (Deans Bridge Road) – Augusta, Fort Gordon, Thomson	Northern end of SR 4 concurrency; southern end of US 78, US 278, and SR 10 concurrencies
Richmond	Augusta	220.776	355.305	US 25 south / SR 121 south (Peach Orchard Road) – Waynesboro	Southern end of US 25 and SR 121 concurrencies; interchange
Richmond	Augusta	222.088	357.416	Molly Pond Road north / Doug Barnard Parkway south – Augusta Regional Airport	Southern terminus of Molly Pond Road; northern terminus of Doug Barnard Parkway; former SR 56 Spur south
Richmond	Augusta	224.618	361.488	US 25 Bus. north / SR 28 (Broad Street) – Downtown Augusta, Fort Discovery	Interchange; southern terminus of US 25 Bus.; also serves Bay Street; eastbound lanes have access via Bay Street.
Savannah River		224.861	361.879	US 1 north / US 25 north / US 78 east / US 278 east / SC 121 north (Jefferson Davis Highway) / SR 10 ends – Aiken, Edgefield	Northern end of SR 10 concurrency; continuation into South Carolina
1.000 mi = 1.609 km; 1.000 km = 0.621 mi: Concurrency terminus

== State Route 4 ==
SR 4 is completely concurrent with US 1 from the Florida state line to the main part of Augusta. There, it is one of the main highways through the Medical District. It provides access to T. W. Josey High School, Paine College, the Medical College of Georgia, Augusta University Medical Center, the VA Medical Center, the Augusta University Annex building, and John S. Davidson Fine Arts Magnet School. It helps connect downtown Augusta with the western part of North Augusta, South Carolina.

== See also ==
- Special routes of U.S. Route 1

U.S. Route 1
Previous state: Florida	Georgia	Next state: South Carolina
