= Georgia State Route 110 =

State highway in Georgia, United States

State Route 110
- SR 110 highlighted in red

Route information
- Maintained by GDOT
- Length: 46.2 mi (74.4 km)

Major junctions
- South end: SR 40 east of Folkston
- US 17 / SR 25 in Woodbine; SR 252 in White Oak; US 17 / SR 25 in Waverly; US 82 / SR 520 in Atkinson
- North end: SR 32 east of Hortense

Location
- Country: United States
- State: Georgia
- Counties: Camden, Brantley

Highway system
- Georgia State Highway System; Interstate; US; State; Special
← SR 109	→ SR 111

State Route 110 (SR 110) is a state highway in the southeast part of the U.S. state of Georgia. The highway runs 46.2 miles (74.4 km) from a point east of Folkston, northeast to Woodbine, north to Waverly, and northwest to a point east of Hortense.

== Route description ==
SR 110 begins at an intersection with SR 40 about 5 miles (8.0 km) east of Folkston, in Camden county. The route heads northeast to an intersection with US 17/SR 25 in Woodbine. The three routes begin a concurrency to the north. Just after leaving the city, it crosses the Satilla River. In White Oak, SR 110 intersects SR 252. In Waverly, SR 110 departs the concurrency to the northwest. Just before Atkinson, the route has a very brief concurrency with US 82/SR 520. The route leaves Atkinson to the north and curves to the northwest to its northern end, at an intersection with SR 32, east of Hortense.

Note: SR 110 is unsigned for its concurrency with US 17/SR 25.

== Major intersections ==
County	Location	mi	km	Destinations	Notes
Camden		0.0	0.0	SR 40 – Folkston, Kingsland	Southern terminus
Camden	Woodbine	14.4	23.2	US 17 south (Bedell Avenue) / SR 25 south	Southern end of US 17/SR 25 concurrency
Camden	Satilla River via the J. Edwin Godley Memorial Bridge at mile 14.8				
Camden	White Oak	18.9	30.4	SR 252 (Burnt Ford Road) – Folkston	
Camden	Waverly	23.2	37.3	US 17 north / SR 25 north (Ocean Highway)	Northern end of US 17/SR 25 concurrency
Brantley		36.8	59.2	US 82 east / SR 520 east	Southern end of US 82/SR 520 concurrency
Brantley	Atkinson	37.2	59.9	US 82 west / SR 520 west (South Georgia Parkway)	Northern end of US 82/SR 520 concurrency
Brantley		46.2	74.4	SR 32	Northern terminus
1.000 mi = 1.609 km; 1.000 km = 0.621 mi: Concurrency terminus
