= Georgia State Route 40 =

Highway in Georgia

State Route 40
- SR 40; mainline in red, spur routes in blue

Route information
- Maintained by GDOT
- Length: 30.46 mi (49.02 km)
- Existed: 1919–present

Major junctions
- West end: US 1 / US 23 / US 301 / SR 4 / SR 15 in Folkston
- SR 110 in Colerain; US 17 / SR 25 in Kingsland; I-95 east of Kingland; SR 40 Spur northwest of St. Marys
- East end: Church Street in St. Marys

Location
- Country: United States
- State: Georgia
- Counties: Charlton, Camden

Highway system
- Georgia State Highway System; Interstate; US; State; Special
← SR 39	→ US 41

State Route 40 (SR 40) is a 30.46-mile-long (49.02 km) state highway in the southeast part of the U.S. state of Georgia. The highway travels from Third Street in Folkston east to Church Street in St. Marys. SR 40 is the primary east–west highway of eastern Charlton County and southern Camden County. The highway connects Folkston and St. Marys with Kingsland, where the highway meets Interstate 95 (I-95) and US 17/SR 25. SR 40 also serves as the majority of the route from I-95 to Naval Submarine Base Kings Bay and Cumberland Island National Seashore. SR 40 has a pair of auxiliary routes: a connector route in Folkston and a spur route in St. Marys that provides access to the submarine base and Crooked River State Park.

SR 40 was assigned to the Folkston–St. Marys highway in the early 1920s. The highway was first improved in the mid-1920s and paved in the mid-1930s from Kingsland to St. Marys. SR 40 was paved from Folkston east to the Charlton–Camden county line in the late 1930s and from the county line to Kingsland in the early 1940s. The highway was extensively relocated between Folkston and Kingsland in the mid-1960s. SR 40 was expanded to four lanes, much of it divided highway, east of Kingsland in the 1980s. The Georgia Department of Transportation (GDOT) has long-term plans to expand the state highway to a four-lane divided highway from Folkston to Kingsland. The first portion of this project was completed east of Folkston in the mid-2000s.

== Route description ==
SR 40 has a pair of similarly named official designations west of Kingsland. The Georgia General Assembly designated part of the Okefenokee Parkway from Folkston to I-95, which was then under construction, in 1968. SR 40 from Folkston to Kingsland became one of ten stretches of highway designated part of the Okefenokee Trail by the state legislature in 2006. The highway is a part of the National Highway System for its entire length.

=== Folkston to Kingsland ===
SR 40 begins at Second Street (US 1/US 23/US 301/SR 4/SR 15) in the city of Folkston. The road runs along Main Street for one block until the intersection with Third Street, where it turns south for one block and then east again at Kingsland Drive around the southern edge of the historic Charlton County Courthouse. Between Folkston and Kingsland, the highway crosses several streams that feed into the parallel St. Marys River.

SR 40 at the west end, leaves Folkston as a two-lane road traveling east. The road expands to a four-lane divided highway for about 2 miles (3.2 km) before reverting to two lanes shortly before crossing the Charlton–Camden county line. SR 40 enters Kingsland on King Avenue, which has a grade crossing of the First Coast Railroad and intersects US 17/SR 25 (Lee Street). Here, the state highway expands to a four-lane undivided street. SR 40 expands again to a five-lane road with center turn lane in the vicinity of the Kingsland Fire-Rescue headquarters and then a six-lane divided highway as it begins to closely parallel the St. Marys Railroad through a commercial area just west of its partial cloverleaf interchange with I-95.

=== Kingsland to St. Marys ===
Near the east end of the commercial area on either side of I-95, SR 40 becomes a five-lane road with center turn lane. SR 40 gains a median again at its intersection with Kings Bay Road, one of several highways that lead to Naval Submarine Base Kings Bay. Another main highway to the naval base is St. Marys Road, which the highway meets at a partial cloverleaf interchange on the boundary between the cities of Kingsland and St. Marys. SR 40 intersects a branch of the railroad that heads into the naval base, crosses a bridge over Dark Entry Creek before meeting the southern end of SR 40 Spur (Charlie Smith Sr. Highway), which heads north along the western edge of the naval base on its way to Crooked River State Park.

SR 40 continues through St. Marys along Osborne Road, which is a five-lane road with center turn lane until after it passes to the south of St. Marys Airport. SR 40 reduces to four lanes and then two as it curves south onto Osborne Street in the center of St. Marys. The highway intersects the St. Marys Railroad near the line's eastern terminus before reaching its own eastern end at the intersection of Osborne Street and Church Street. Osborne Street continues south past the historic home Orange Hall and into the St. Marys Historic District, at the southern end of which is the passenger ferry to Cumberland Island and its national seashore.

== History ==
SR 40 was assigned to the highway from Folkston to St. Marys via Kingsland by 1920. However, the route from Folkston to what became US 17/SR 25 in Kingsland was not marked on maps between 1921 and January 1932. The highway that was to become SR 40 followed most of its present alignment from Folkston to the Charlton–Camden county line in 1919 but had a significantly different route in western Camden County, following what are now Colerain Road, Forestry Road, Marr Cemetery Road, Oakhill Church Road, Willies Loop, Old Folkston Road, Arizona Avenue, and several sections of abandoned highway. East of Kingsland, the highway followed most of its present alignment but crossed the parallel railroad several times.

By 1926, the Kingsland–St. Marys highway was a sand or dirt road. When the Folkston–Kingsland stretch of SR 40 reappeared on maps in February 1932, the highway was recorded as an unimproved but maintained road. SR 40 was under construction along its present alignment from US 17 in Kingsland to the south end of Osborne Street in St. Marys by October 1934; the highway was completed as a paved road by January 1936. The highway from Folkston to the Charlton–Camden county line was under construction by October 1936. The construction was extended east from the county line to the highway's original SR 110 junction in July 1937. When construction concluded in October 1937, there was a paved highway from Folkston to the county line and a graded but otherwise unimproved highway from there to SR 110. SR 40 between Colerain and the western edge of Kingsland was under construction by July 1939 and paving was completed in January 1941. The gap in Kingsland was placed under construction by April 1941 but was not completed until the beginning of 1943.

The first major rerouting of SR 40 occurred between 1963 and 1966 when the highway was moved to its present alignment between the Charlton–Camden county line and Kingsland. By 1982, the highway had been expanded to a divided highway around its interchange with I-95 and to a four-lane undivided highway from there to St. Marys. The divided highway section was extended west toward downtown Kingsland in 1984. SR 40's interchange with St. Marys Road was built and the highway was expanded to a divided highway from Kings Bay Road to SR 40 Spur by 1986. The entire length of the highway was designated a Governor's Road Improvement Program (GRIP) corridor in 1989. GDOT plans to expand the entire highway west of I-95 to a four-lane divided highway. The first new section of the highway to be expanded to a four-lane divided highway was the 2-mile (3.2 km) stretch west of the Charlton–Camden county line, which was completed in 2004.

== Major intersections ==
County	Location	mi	km	Destinations	Notes
Charlton	Folkston	0.00	0.00	US 1 / US 23 / US 301 / SR 4 / SR 15 – Waycross, Nahunta, Saint George, Jacksonville	Western terminus
Charlton	Folkston	1.10	1.77	SR 40 Conn. west (Cross Street) to SR 252 – White Oak	Eastern terminus of SR 40 Conn.
Camden	Colerain	7.46	12.01	SR 110 north – Woodbine	Southern terminus of SR 110
Camden	Kingsland	19.89	32.01	US 17 / SR 25 (Lee Street) – Woodbine, Jacksonville	
Camden	Kingsland	21.97	35.36	I-95 (SR 405) – Savannah, Jacksonville	I-95 exit 3
Camden	St. Marys	25.89	41.67	St. Marys Road – Naval Submarine Base Kings Bay	Partial cloverleaf interchange
Camden	St. Marys	27.78	44.71	SR 40 Spur north (Charlie Smith, Sr., Highway) – Naval Submarine Base Kings Bay, Crooked River State Park	Southern terminus of SR 40 Spur
Camden	St. Marys	30.46	49.02	Church Street / Osborne Street south	Eastern terminus
1.000 mi = 1.609 km; 1.000 km = 0.621 mi

== Special routes ==
=== SR 40 Connector ===
State Route 40 Connector
- Location: Folkston
- Length: 1.33 mi (2.14 km)
- Existed: 2005–present

State Route 40 Connector (SR 40 Connector) is a 1.33-mile (2.14 km) connector route of SR 40 in Folkston. The route follows Indian Trail from US 1/US 23/US 301/SR 4/SR 15/SR 23/SR 121 on the north side of town southeast to SR 40 east of Folkston. SR 40 Connector heads east from the U.S. highways as a two-lane road that passes Charlton County High School. The highway continues southeast and intersects SR 252, which heads west towards downtown Folkston and east towards White Oak in northern Camden County. SR 40 Connector remainder of its course to SR 40 (Kingsland Drive). SR 40 CONN was designated along Indian Trail.

=== SR 40 Spur ===
State Route 40 Spur
- Location: St. Marys
- Length: 6.58 mi (10.59 km)
- Existed: 1941–present

State Route 40 Spur (SR 40 Spur) is a 6.58-mile (10.59 km) spur route of SR 40 in St. Marys. The route is officially named Charlie Smith Sr. Highway based on a 1994 Georgia Transportation Board resolution honoring a local politician from Camden County; the highway is also known as Crooked River Road. SR 40 Spur begins at an intersection with SR 40 (Osborne Road) northwest of downtown St. Marys and heads north as a five-lane road with center turn lane through a mixed commercial and residential area. North of its oblique intersection with Colerain Road and Douglas Drive, the spur route expands to a controlled-access divided highway and serves as the western boundary of Naval Submarine Base Kings Bay. Access to the base is provided at intersections with USS Benjamin Franklin Drive opposite St. Marys Road and USS Henry L. Stimson Drive opposite Kings Bay Road. North of the latter junction, SR 40 Spur reduces to two lanes and has a grade crossing with the branch of the St. Marys Railroad that enters the naval base. Further north, the highway has a pair of intersections with USS Andrew Jackson Drive and USS Proteus Boulevard, which serve the northern part of the military reservation. SR 40 Spur leaves the edge of the base as it enters Crooked River State Park. The highway reaches its northern terminus at the park gate a short distance south of the Crooked River. SR 40 Spur was designated by the beginning of 1941 and was under construction later that year. The paved road was completed in 1942. SR 40 Spur was expanded to four lanes from SR 40 to Kings Bay Road around 1986.
