= Bryan Neck Presbyterian Church =

Historic church in Georgia, United States

- U.S. National Register of Historic Places
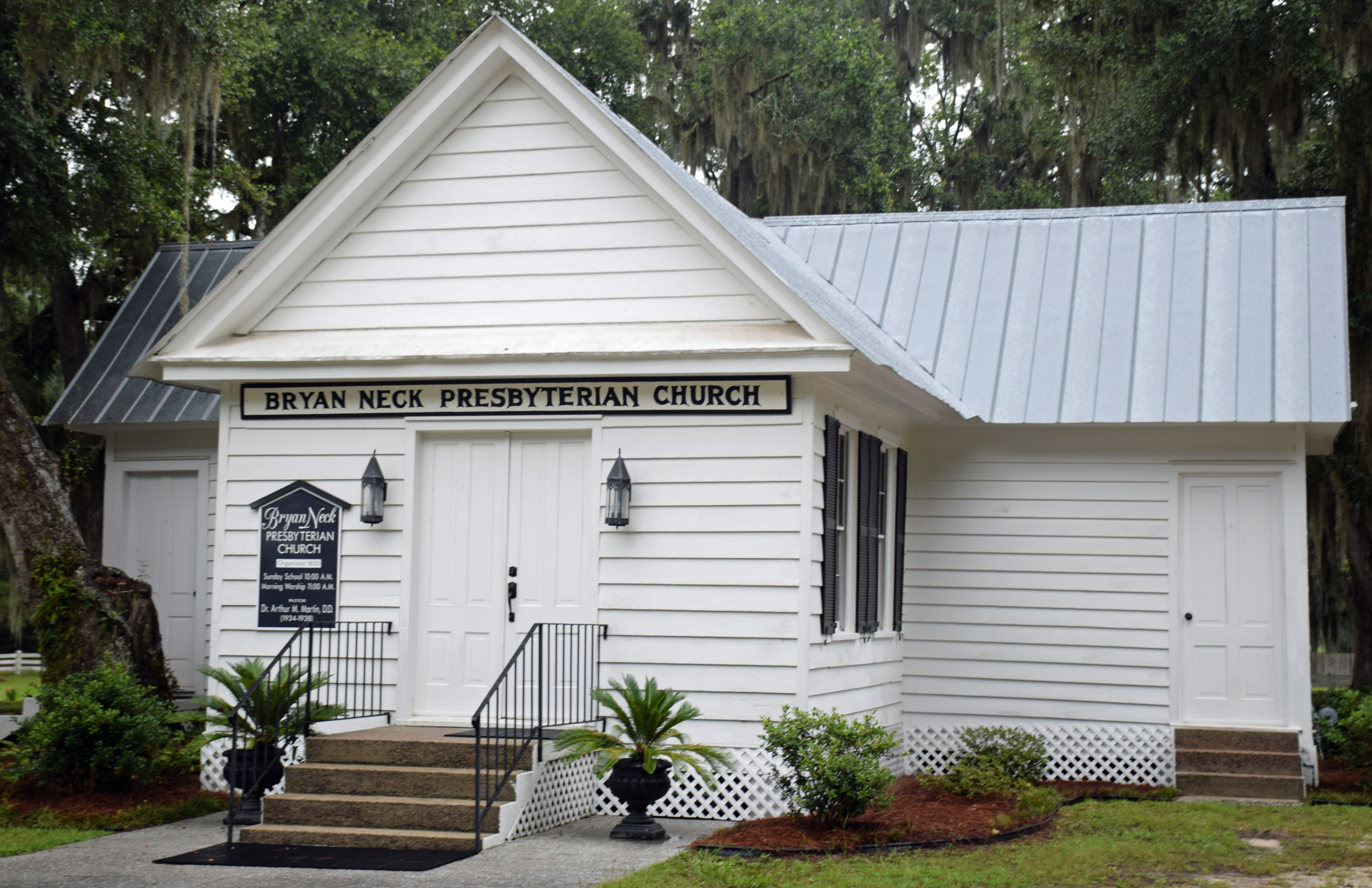

- Location within Georgia Location within the United States
- Location: Belfast Keller Rd., Keller, Georgia
- Coordinates: 31°50′30″N 81°15′40″W
- Area: 2 acres (0.81 ha)
- Built: 1885
- Architectural style: Colonial Revival, Bungalow/craftsman
- NRHP reference No.: 00000193
- Added to NRHP: March 15, 2000

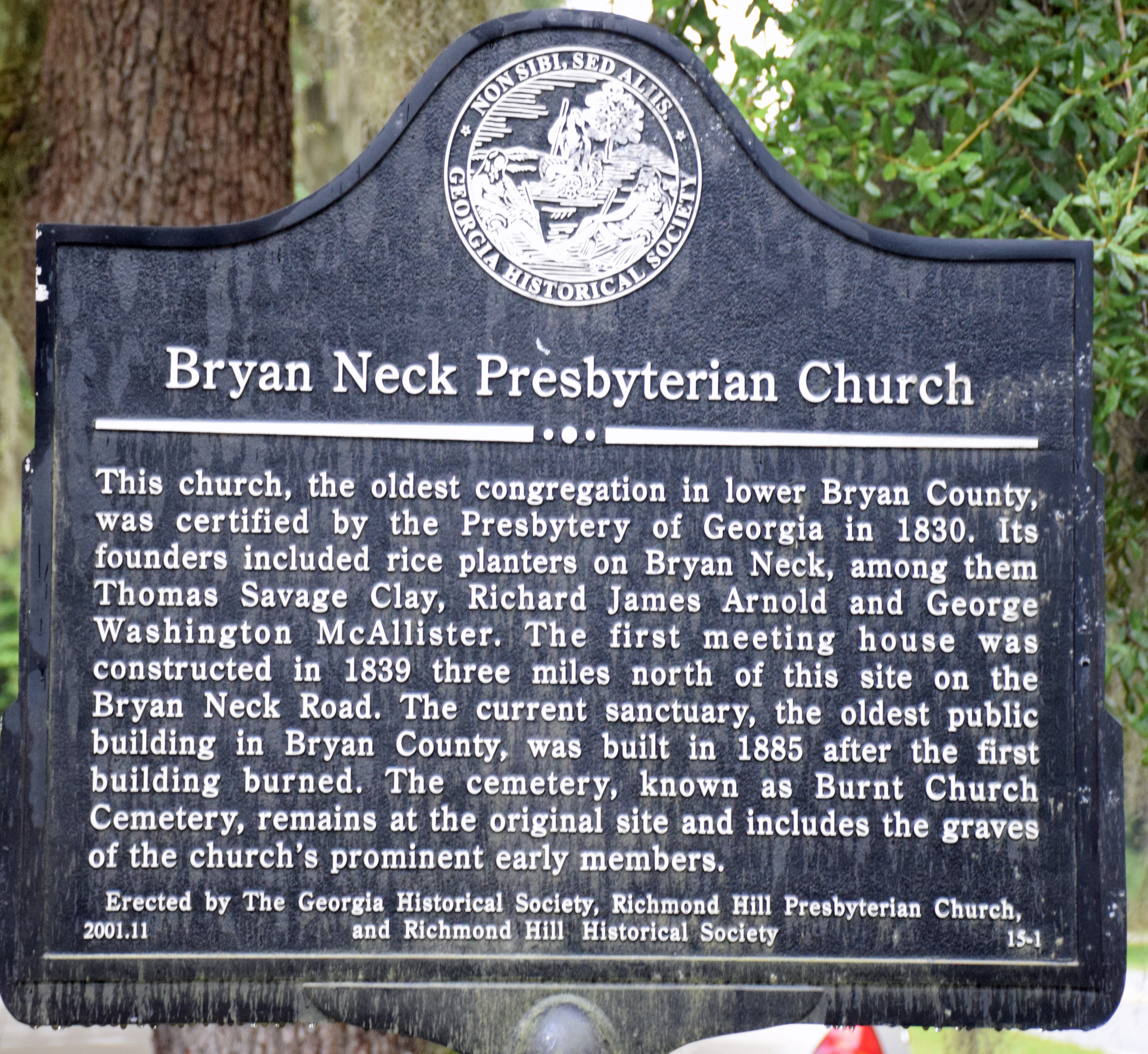
Historical marker

Bryan Neck Presbyterian Church is a historic Presbyterian church on a 2-acre tract on Belfast Keller Road in Keller, Georgia. The historic district includes a manse (built in 1939) and a cemetery. The inside of the church has varnished tongue-and-grove wood paneling in different orientations to form decorative patterns. Many of the interior furnishings are original. It was built in 1885 and was added to the National Register of Historic Places in 2000.

== See also ==
- National Register of Historic Places listings in Bryan County, Georgia
