= Fort McAllister =

Historic fort in the US

- U.S. National Register of Historic Places
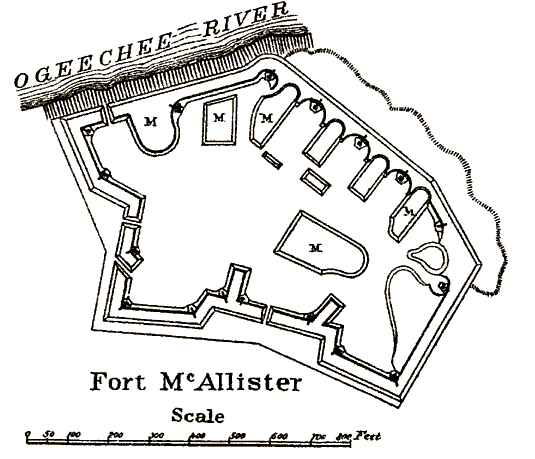
- Plan of the fort

- Location within Georgia Location within the United States
- Location: Near Midway, Georgia
- Nearest city: Richmond Hill, Georgia
- Coordinates: 31°53′28″N 81°11′46″W
- Area: 30 acres (12 ha)
- Built: 1861
- Architect: Capt. John McCrady
- NRHP reference No.: 70000197
- Added to NRHP: May 13, 1970

Fort McAllister was a Confederate earthen-work fort used to defend Savannah, Georgia during the American Civil War. It was the southernmost of the forts defending Savannah and was involved in the most battles. It was located on the Ogeechee River in Bryan County. It is listed on the National Register of Historic Places (#70000197). Fort McAllister was one of three forts protecting Savannah, the others being Fort Pulaski and Fort James Jackson standing in Confederate defiance of the Union naval blockade. The southeast coast of the United States was the place where both combatants tested the latest in naval artillery and coastal defenses. Fort McAllister was the key to unlocking the defenses around Savannah, one of the most important Confederate ports on the Atlantic Ocean.

== History ==
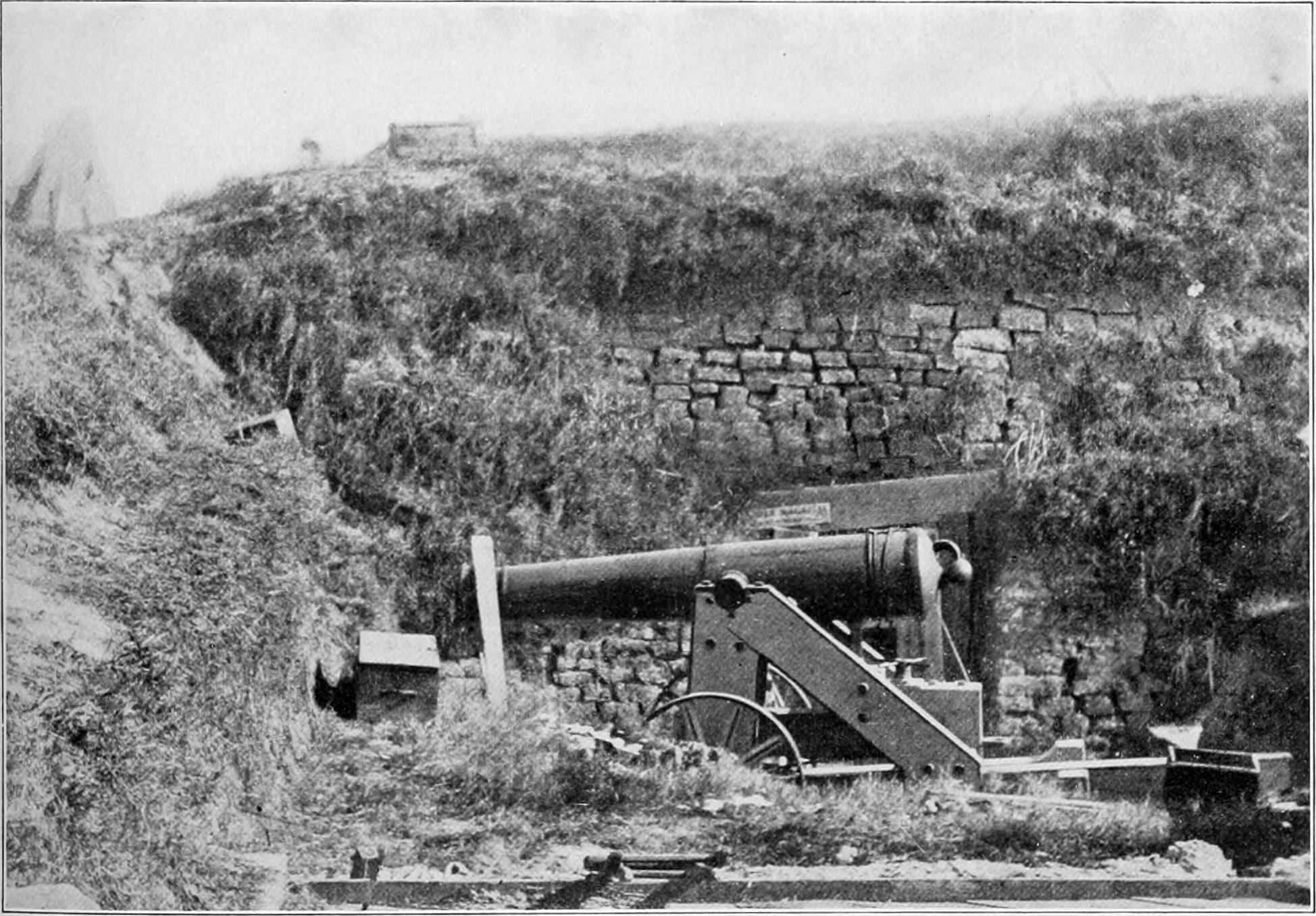
After the siege of the fort

The fort was designed by Capt. John McCrady. In 1861 Gen. Robert E. Lee inspected the fort and recommended making it stronger. McCrady made the changes recommended by Lee and the earthen walls were better able to withstand bombardment from artillery fire. The fort had seven cannon emplacements. The bombproof area in the center housed a hospital, supply area, barracks, officer's quarters, gun power, and additional guns. A 10-inch mortar was kept outside the fort to keep it from shaking the dirt off the walls when it was fired.

The fort was attacked seven times by ships over the next two years. The fort withstood all of these attacks with only minimal damage and few casualties. There were four naval attacks in 1862. Union ironclad monitors began to attack the fort on January 27, 1863, starting with the Montauk and later with the Passaic, Nahant, and Patapsco. The Montauk had an 11-inch and a 15-inch cannon, the largest size used in the war. The ironclad bombarded the fort for 5 hours but caused no casualties and little damage because the earth absorbed the artillery shells and the damage was easily repaired. Similarly, the fort's cannons hit the ironclad 15 times but caused no significant damage. The Montauk made another unsuccessful attack on February 1, except that fort commander Maj. John B. Gallie was killed. A 7-hour bombardment on March 3 also failed to damage the fort.

The fort was the site of the sinking of the CSS Nashville on February 28, 1863.

On December 13, 1864, Gen. William T. Sherman reached the fort on his March to the Sea. Gen. William B. Hazen's infantry division attacked the fort, defended by Maj. George Wayne Anderson and some 230 troops. The Union force overpowered the fort's defenders in about 15 minutes of battle. Fort McAllister was the last fort defending Savannah. After it fell, Gen. William J. Hardee withdrew his 10,000 troops that were defending Savannah and Sherman captured the city without resistance. Sherman's army abandoned the fort and burned its bunkers.

During the evening that the fort fell, Anderson was being held at the McAllister family home, the new headquarters of General William Babcock Hazen. General Hazen and Lt. Col. Strong invited General Sherman to dinner, to celebrate their victory. In a kind gesture of respect, General Hazen also invited Major Anderson to attend the meal, after clearing the request with Sherman. The discussion was surely lively - during the meal Anderson engaged in a heated exchange with General Sherman about the tactics employed to defend the fort and the bravery of all who fought there. Cigars were exchanged and smoked, and tributes were made to the fallen. However, Sherman remained greatly upset at Anderson's use of land mines in the defense of the fort, and ordered the Major to personally join his fellow captured Confederates on mine-clearing detail.

== After the war ==
In the late 1930s, Henry Ford bought the property and began restoring it. The International Paper Company purchased the property from Ford's estate and gave it to the State of Georgia in 1958. The Georgia Historical Commission continued to restore the fort to its 1863-64 appearance. The museum displays many artifacts. The fort was listed on the National Register of Historic Places in 1970. The fort site was combined with the adjacent Richmond Hill State Park to create the Fort McAllister State Historic Park.

== Gallery ==
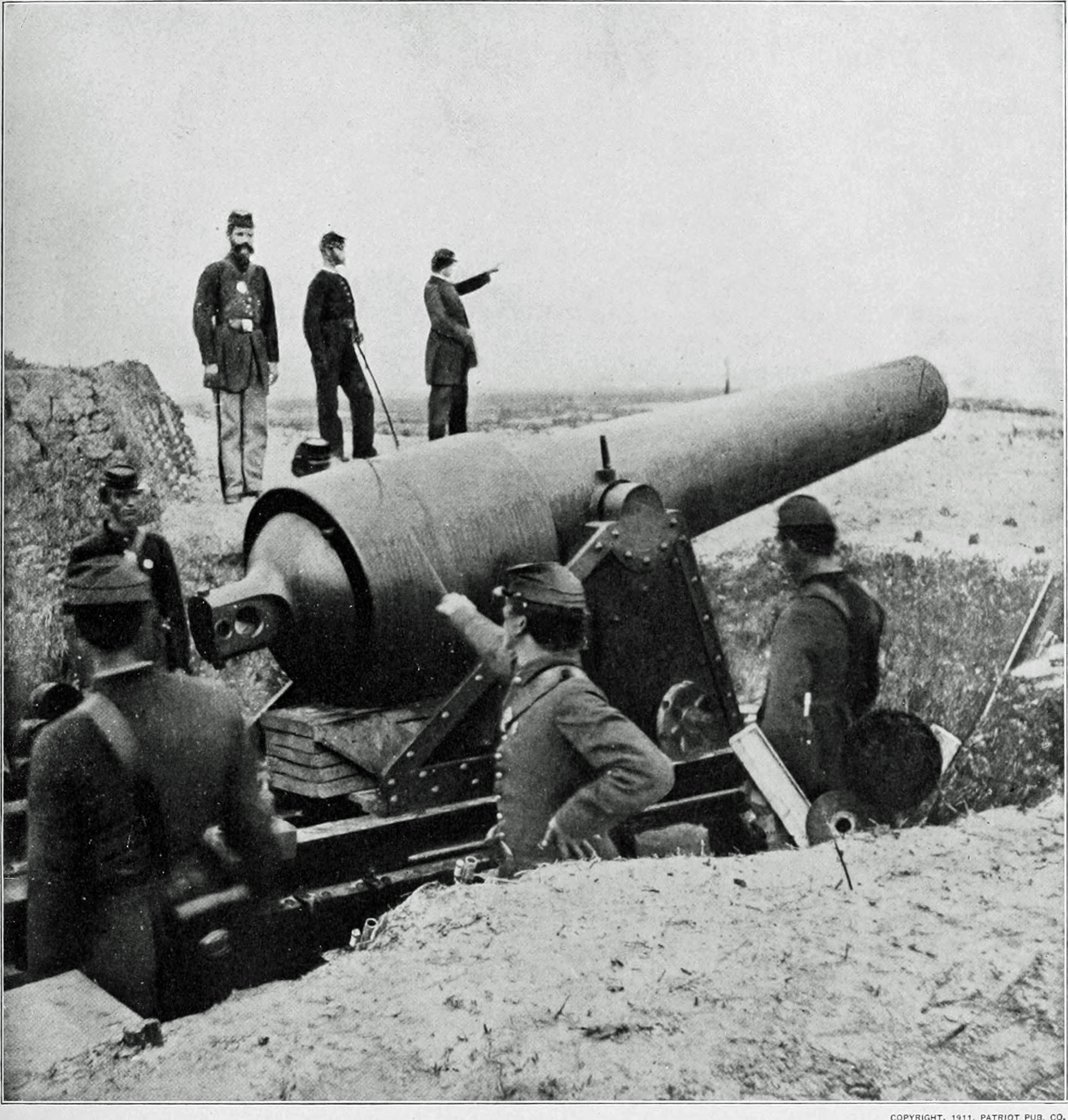
Fort McAllister Captured

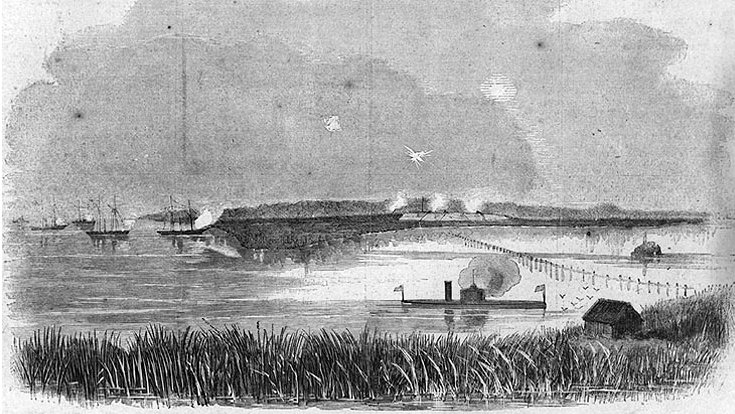
USS Montauk Attacks Fort McAllister

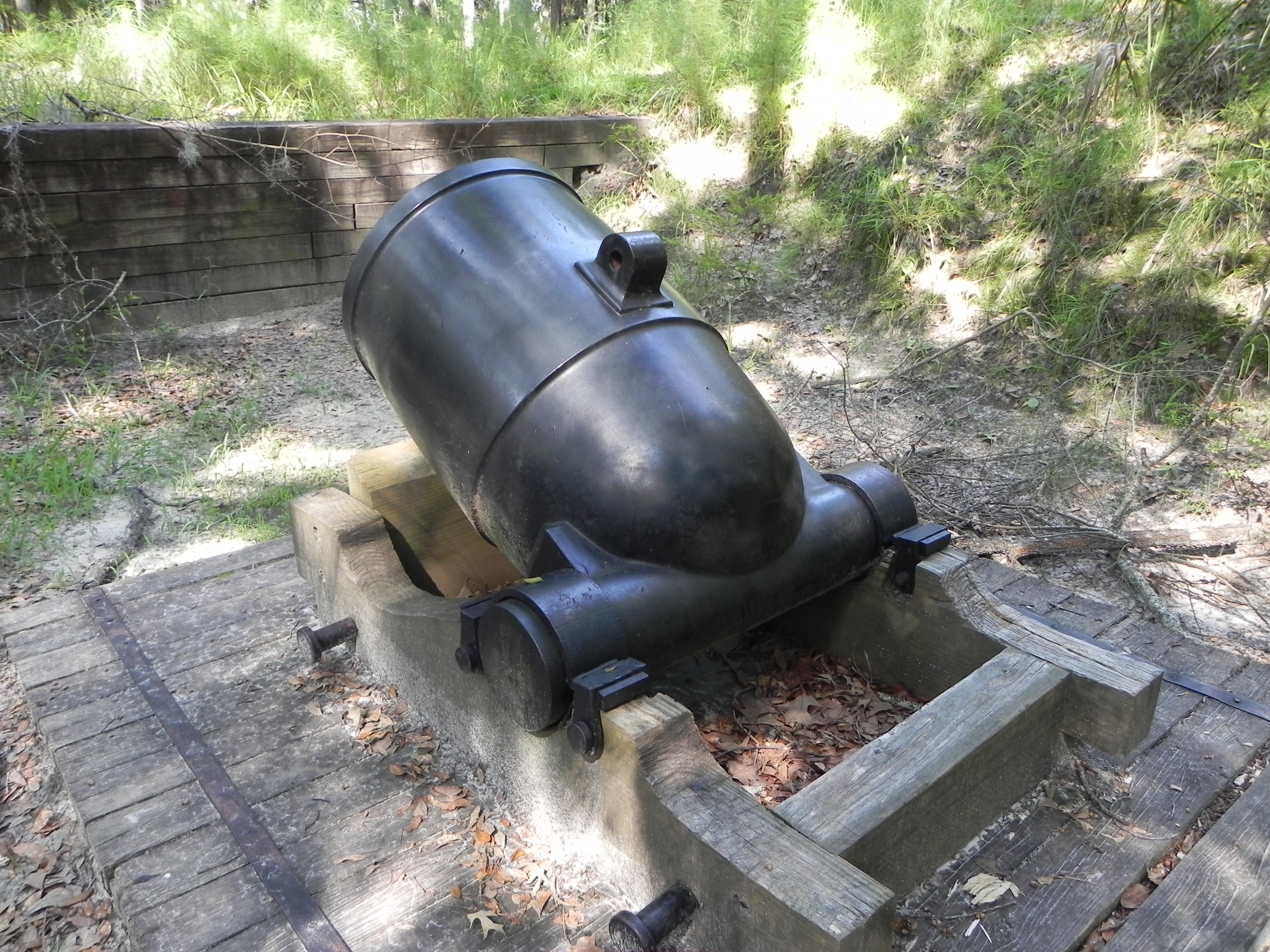
Mortar at Fort McAllister

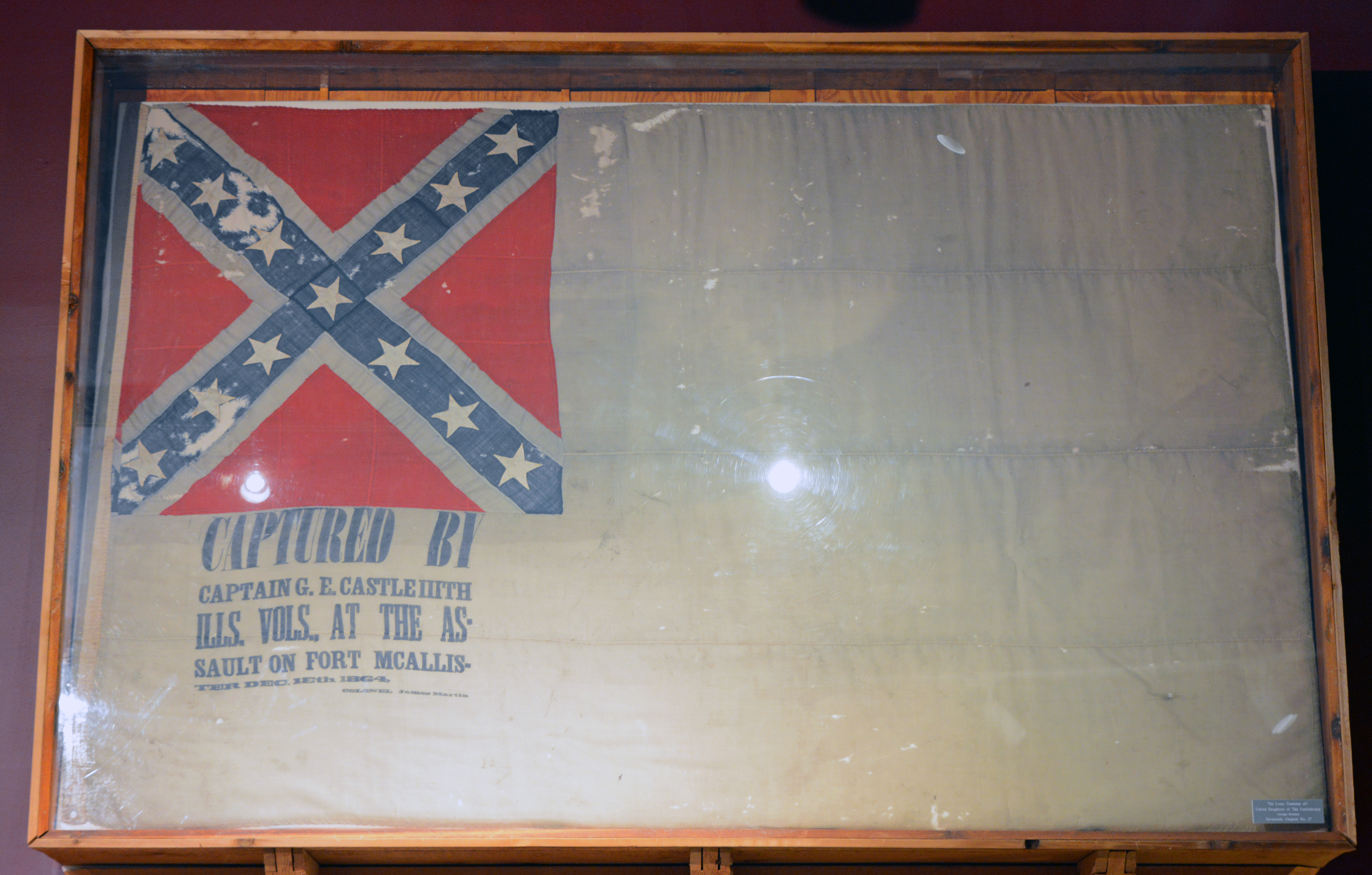
Confederate National Flag captured from Fort McAllister

== See also ==
- Fort McAllister Historic Park, a Georgia state park located near Keller and Richmond Hill
- First Battle of Fort McAllister, naval attacks which took place from January 27 to March 3, 1863
- Second Battle of Fort McAllister, Union capture of the Fort on December 13, 1864
