= Georgia State Route 147 =

State highway in Georgia, United States

State Route 147
- Rogers Road
- SR 147 highlighted in red

Route information
- Maintained by GDOT
- Length: 19.2 mi (30.9 km)

Major junctions
- West end: US 1 / SR 4 / SR 15 near Cedar Crossing
- East end: US 280 / SR 30 in Reidsville

Location
- Country: United States
- State: Georgia
- Counties: Toombs, Tattnall

Highway system
- Georgia State Highway System; Interstate; US; State; Special
← SR 146	→ SR 148

State Route 147 (SR 147) is a 19.2-mile-long (30.9 km) state highway that runs west-to-east through portions of Toombs and Tattnall counties in the east-central part of the U.S. state of Georgia.

== Route description ==
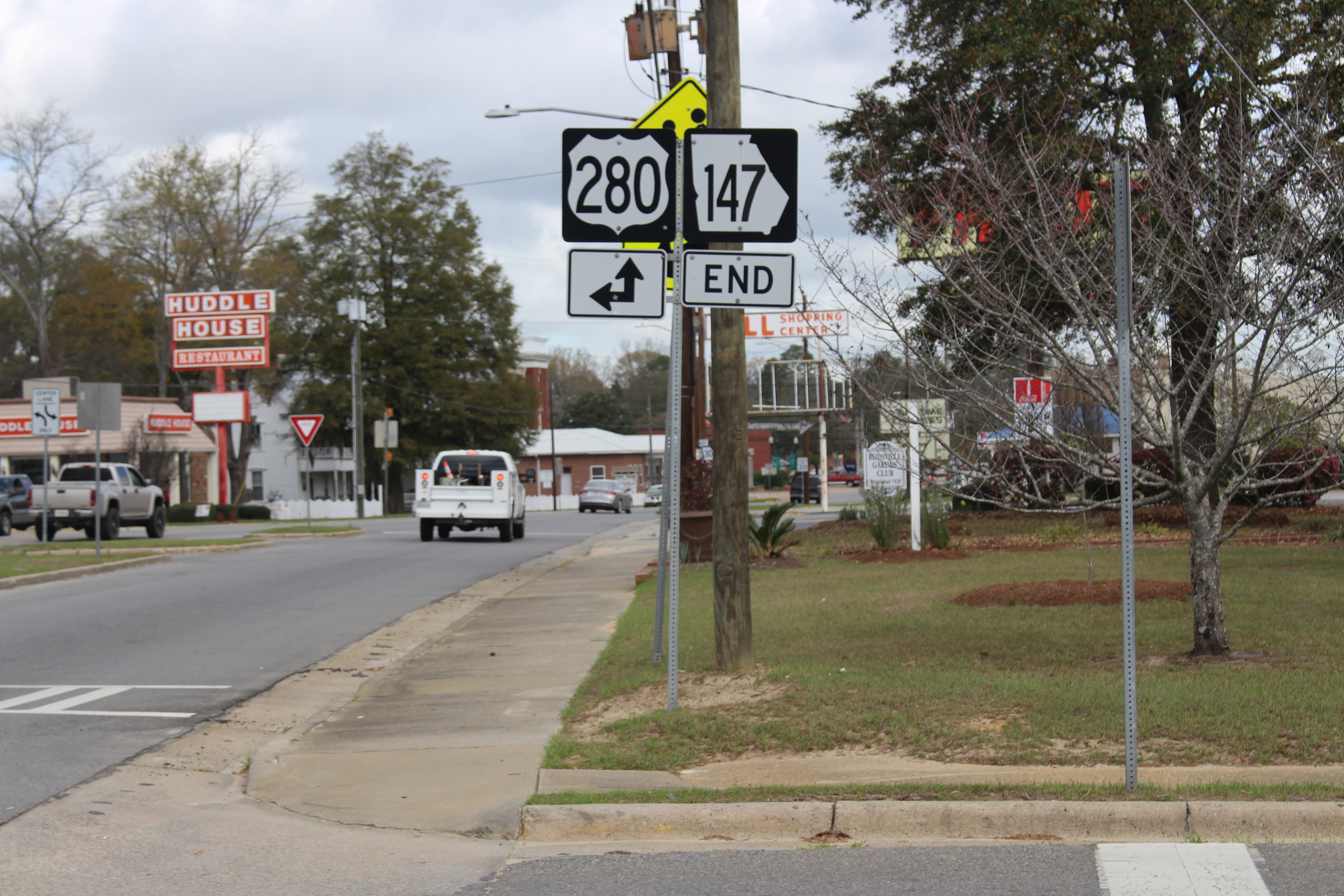
Eastern terminus in Reidsville

SR 147 begins at an intersection with U.S. Route 1 (US 1)/SR 4/SR 15 north of its crossing of the Altamaha River in southern Toombs County. The road heads to the northeast to an intersection with SR 178. The two highways run concurrent for 4.1 miles (6.6 km). It then heads northeast to its eastern terminus an intersection with US 280/SR 30 in Reidsville.

SR 147 is not part of the National Highway System.

== Major intersections ==
County	Location	mi	km	Destinations	Notes
Toombs		0.0	0.0	US 1 / SR 4 / SR 15	Western terminus
Toombs		8.5	13.7	SR 178 north – Vidalia	Western end of SR 178 concurrency
Tattnall		12.6	20.3	SR 178 south – Glennville	Eastern end of SR 178 concurrency
Tattnall		13.5	21.7	Ohoopee River	
Tattnall	Reidsville	19.2	30.9	US 280 / SR 30 (West Brazell Street)	Eastern terminus
1.000 mi = 1.609 km; 1.000 km = 0.621 mi: Concurrency terminus
