= Georgia State Route 178 =

State highway in Georgia, United States

State Route 178
- Georgia State Route 178 highlighted in red

Route information
- Maintained by GDOT
- Length: 29.4 mi (47.3 km)

Major junctions
- West end: US 1 / SR 4 in Lyons
- SR 56 west of Reidsville; SR 147 southwest of Reidsville
- East end: SR 121 / SR 144 / SR 169 southwest of Glennville

Location
- Country: United States
- State: Georgia
- Counties: Toombs, Tattnall

Highway system
- Georgia State Highway System; Interstate; US; State; Special
← SR 177	→ SR 179

State Route 178 (SR 178) is a 29.4-mile-long (47.3 km) state highway in the east-central part of the U.S. state of Georgia. It is routed northwest-to-southeast through portions of Toombs and Tattnall counties.

== Route description ==
SR 178 begins at an intersection with US 1/SR 4 (South State Street) in Lyons, in Toombs County. It heads southeast through rural areas until it intersects SR 56, west of Reidsville. The highway continues to the southeast and meets SR 147, near the Georgia State Prison. The two routes head concurrent into Tattnall County. Just prior to crossing over the Ohoopee River, SR 178 curves to the east and continues in that orientation until it meets its eastern terminus, an intersection with SR 121/SR 144/SR 169 southwest of Glennville.

SR 178 is not part of the National Highway System, a system of roadways important to the nation's economy, defense, and mobility.

== Major intersections ==
County	Location	mi	km	Destinations	Notes
Toombs	Lyons	0.0	0.0	US 1 / SR 4 (South State Street)	Western terminus
Toombs		9.0	14.5	SR 56 – Uvalda, Reidsville	
Toombs		14.0	22.5	SR 147 west – Uvalda	Western end of SR 147 concurrency
Tattnall		18.0	29.0	SR 147 east – Reidsville	Eastern end of SR 147 concurrency
Tattnall		25.1	40.4	Ohoopee River	
Tattnall		29.4	47.3	SR 121 / SR 144 / SR 169	Eastern terminus
1.000 mi = 1.609 km; 1.000 km = 0.621 mi: Concurrency terminus
