= Georgia State Route 144 =

State highway in Georgia, United States

State Route 144
- Georgia State Route 144 highlighted in red

Route information
- Maintained by GDOT
- Length: 83.0 mi (133.6 km)

Major junctions
- West end: US 341 / SR 27 in Baxley
- SR 23 / SR 57 in Glennville; US 25 / US 301 / SR 73 in Glennville; I-95 in Richmond Hill; US 17 / SR 25 in Richmond Hill
- East end: Fancy Hall Drive & Brown Road in southeastern in Fancy Hall

Location
- Country: United States
- State: Georgia
- Counties: Appling, Tattnall, Long, Liberty, Bryan

Highway system
- Georgia State Highway System; Interstate; US; State; Special
← SR 143	→ SR 145

State Route 144 (SR 144) is an 83.0-mile-long (133.6 km) state highway that travels in a west-to-east direction through portions of Appling, Tattnall, Long, Liberty, Bryan counties in the east-central of the U.S. state of Georgia. It connects Baxley with southeastern Bryan County.

== Route description ==
SR 144 begins at an intersection with US 341/SR 27 just east of Baxley, within Appling County. It heads north on Industrial Park Dr approximately 1.5 miles to an intersection with Lanes Bridge Rd, where SR 144 turns east and resumes its old alignment, through rural areas of the county, until it meets an intersection with SR 121/SR 169. The three routes run concurrent to the northeast, across the Altamaha River into Tattnall County. Just before the concurrency ends is an intersection with SR 178 (Dewey D. Rush Highway). The highway heads northeast into Glennville. It meets SR 23/SR 57 (West Barnard Street). The three routes head concurrent into the main part of town, where they intersect with US 25/US 301/SR 73 (Veterans Boulevard). At this intersection, SR 73 ends, and SR 23/SR 57 split from SR 144 and form a concurrency with US 25/US 301 to the south. After leaving Glennville, the highway crosses into Long County and the boundaries of Fort Stewart. In the fort, it crosses into Liberty County, and has a very brief concurrency with SR 119. It heads northeast through the fort and enters Bryan County. A little ways after the county line, the route curves to the southeast. Immediately after leaving the fort, in Richmond Hill, is an interchange with Interstate 95 (I-95). Farther in town, SR 144 has an intersection with US 17/SR 25. After leaving town, it continues to the southeast and curves to the south to meet SR 144 Spur (Fort McAllister Road), which leads to Fort McAllister Historic Park. The road continues in a southerly direction, through Keller, and on to meet its eastern terminus, on Bryan Neck Road, just north of the intersection of Fancy Hall Drive & Brown Road in the southeastern part of the county.

The only section of SR 144 that is part of the National Highway System, a system of roadways important to the nation's economy, defense, and mobility, is the section between SR 119 and I-95.

== Major intersections ==
County	Location	mi	km	Destinations	Notes
Appling	Baxley	0.0	0.0	US 341 / SR 27	Western terminus
Appling		14.7	23.7	SR 121 south / SR 169 south – Surrency, Jesup	Western end of SR 121/SR 169 concurrency
Altamaha River		15.5	24.9	Unnamed bridge over the Altamaha River; marking the Appling–Tattnall county line	
Tattnall		20.4	32.8	SR 178 west (Dewey D. Rush Highway)	Eastern terminus of SR 178
Tattnall		21.5	34.6	SR 121 north / SR 169 north – Reidsville, Bellville	Eastern end of SR 121/SR 169 concurrency
Tattnall	Glennville	27.5	44.3	SR 23 north / SR 57 north (West Barnard Street)	Western end of SR 23/SR 57 concurrency
Tattnall	Glennville	28.1	45.2	US 25 / US 301 / SR 73 north / SR 23 south / SR 57 south (Veterans Boulevard) – Ludowici, Claxton	Eastern end of SR 23/SR 57 concurrency; southern terminus of SR 73
Long	No major junctions				
Liberty	Fort Stewart	46.8	75.3	SR 119 north – Pembroke	Western end of SR 119 concurrency
Liberty	Fort Stewart	47.6	76.6	SR 119 south (Gulick Avenue) – Hinesville	Eastern end of SR 119 concurrency
Bryan	Richmond Hill	67.6	108.8	I-95 (SR 405) – Brunswick, Savannah	I-95 exit 90
Bryan	Richmond Hill	68.8	110.7	US 17 / SR 25	
Bryan		74.1	119.3	SR 144 Spur east (Fort McAllister Road) – Fort McAllister Historic Park	Western terminus of SR 144 Spur
Bryan	Fancy Hall	83.0	133.6	Fancy Hall Drive south / Brown Road north	Eastern terminus
1.000 mi = 1.609 km; 1.000 km = 0.621 mi: Concurrency terminus

== Spur route ==
State Route 144 Spur
- Location: West of Fort McAllister Historic Park
- Length: 3.7 mi (6.0 km)

State Route 144 Spur (SR 144 Spur) is a 3.7-mile (6.0 km) spur route that exists entirely within the southern part of Bryan County.

Route description

It begins southeast of Richmond Hill, at an intersection with the SR 144 mainline. The highway heads east, south of the Ogeechee River until it meets its eastern terminus, the entrance to Fort McAllister Historic Park.

SR 144 Spur is not part of the National Highway System, a system of roadways important to the nation's economy, defense, and mobility.

Major intersections

The entire route is in Bryan County.

Location	mi	km	Destinations	Notes
	0.0	0.0	SR 144 (Bryan Neck Road) – Richmond Hill, Keller	Western terminus
Fort McAllister Historic Park	3.7	6.0	Entrance road	Eastern terminus
1.000 mi = 1.609 km; 1.000 km = 0.621 mi

== See also ==
- Georgia State Route 63 (1921–1967)
