= Keller, Georgia =

Unincorporated community in Georgia, U.S.

Coordinates: 31°50′36″N 81°15′13″W

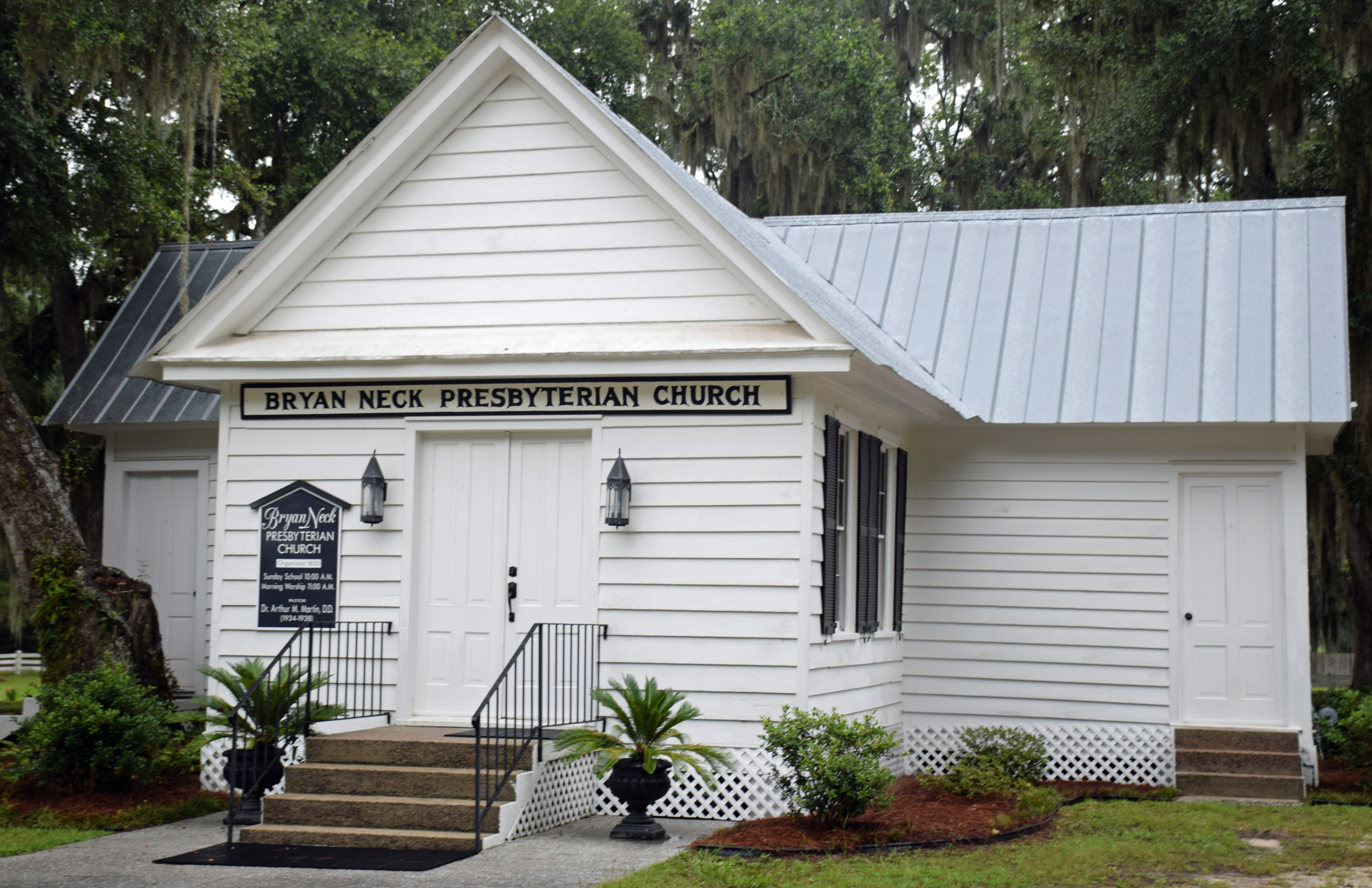
Bryan Neck Presbyterian Church

Keller is a small unincorporated community located in southern Bryan County, Georgia, United States, east of Richmond Hill. Its boundaries are ill-defined, but the community could be said to be centered on the intersection of S.R. 144 and Belfast-Keller Road. Currently the area, like most of South Bryan, is an unincorporated community of extensive residential development with a number of planned neighborhoods. However, Keller also has a significant historical aspect. It is near Fort McAllister Historic Park, an earthen Civil War installation captured by General William Sherman on his March to the Sea. Bryan Neck Presbyterian Church, established in 1839 and rebuilt in 1885, is listed on the National Register of Historic Places, and is located on Belfast-Keller Road about a mile from the S.R. 144 intersection. A number of antebellum plantation houses or sites exist along the marshes and waterfront areas of extreme south Bryan County, though none are in public hands or are preserved as historic sites.

The community is part of the Savannah Metropolitan Statistical Area.
