= Fort McAllister Historic State Park =

Heritage site in Richmond Hill, Georgia, US

Fort McAllister State Park
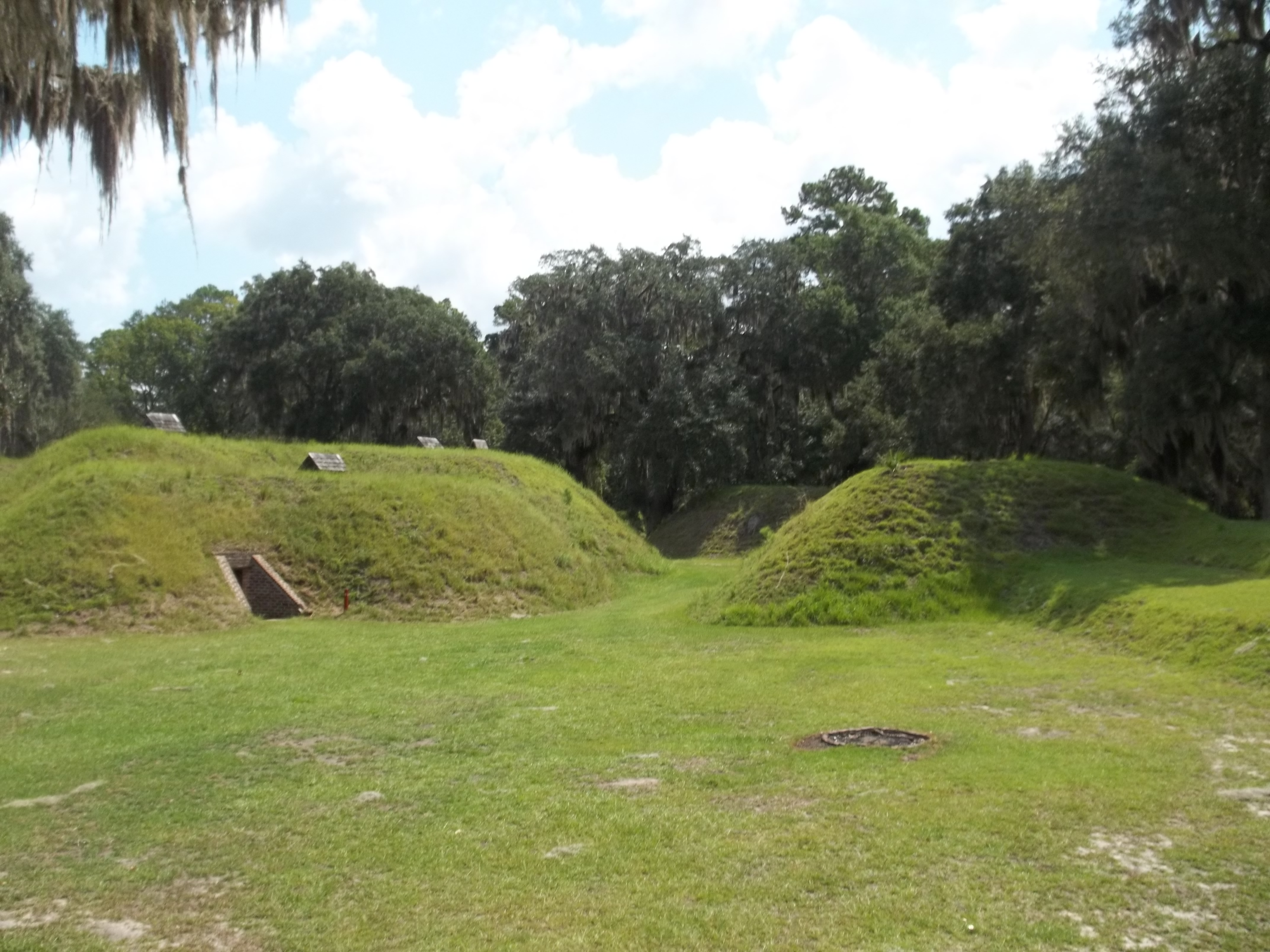
- Inside the fort

- Location within Georgia Location within the United States
- Location: Bryan County, Georgia, USA
- Nearest city: Richmond Hill, Georgia
- Coordinates: 31°53′28″N 81°11′46″W
- Website: Official website
- Fort McAllister Historic State Park
- U.S. National Register of Historic Places
- Area: 30 acres (12 ha)
- Built: 1861
- Architect: Captain John McCrady
- NRHP reference No.: 70000197

Fort McAllister State Park is a 1,725-acre (698 ha) Georgia state park located near Keller and Richmond Hill in south Bryan County, Georgia and on the south bank of the Ogeechee River (some parts of the park border the Atlantic Ocean). It is roughly ten miles south of Savannah. The park is home to Fort McAllister, the best-preserved earthwork fortification of the Confederacy. Though the earthworks were attacked unsuccessfully seven times by Union soldiers, it did not fall until it was taken by General Sherman in 1864 during his March to the Sea. The park, located on the coast, is nestled among giant live oaks and a large salt marsh. In addition, the park contains a museum specializing in Civil War artifacts. The fort was added to the National Register of Historic Places in 1970.

== Facilities ==
- 56 tent/trailer/RV Campsites
- 2 Backcountry Campsites
- 7 Cottages
- 2 Picnic Shelters
- 2 Pioneer Campgrounds
- 1 Group Shelter
- Hiking trail - 4.3 miles (6.9 km) of trails - One is 3.1 miles (5.0 km) long and the other 1.2 miles (1.9 km) long
- Boat ramps
- Dock
- Fishing pier
- Civil War museum
- Playground
- Outdoor fitness park

== Annual events ==
- 4th of July Barbecue, Picnic and Craft Show (July)
- Fort tours
- Labor Day and Winter Musters
- Super Sundays

== Photos ==
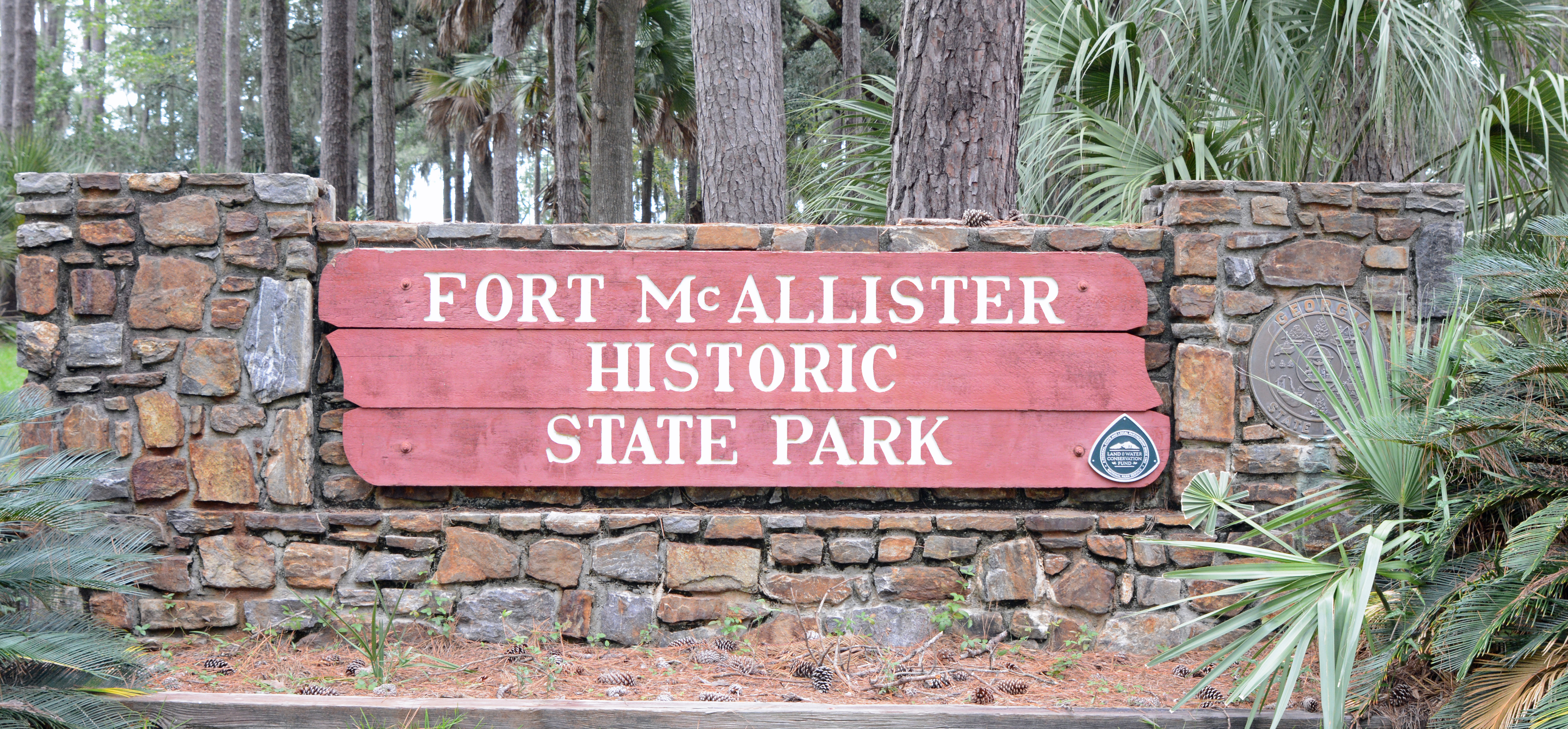
Sign at the entrance of the park

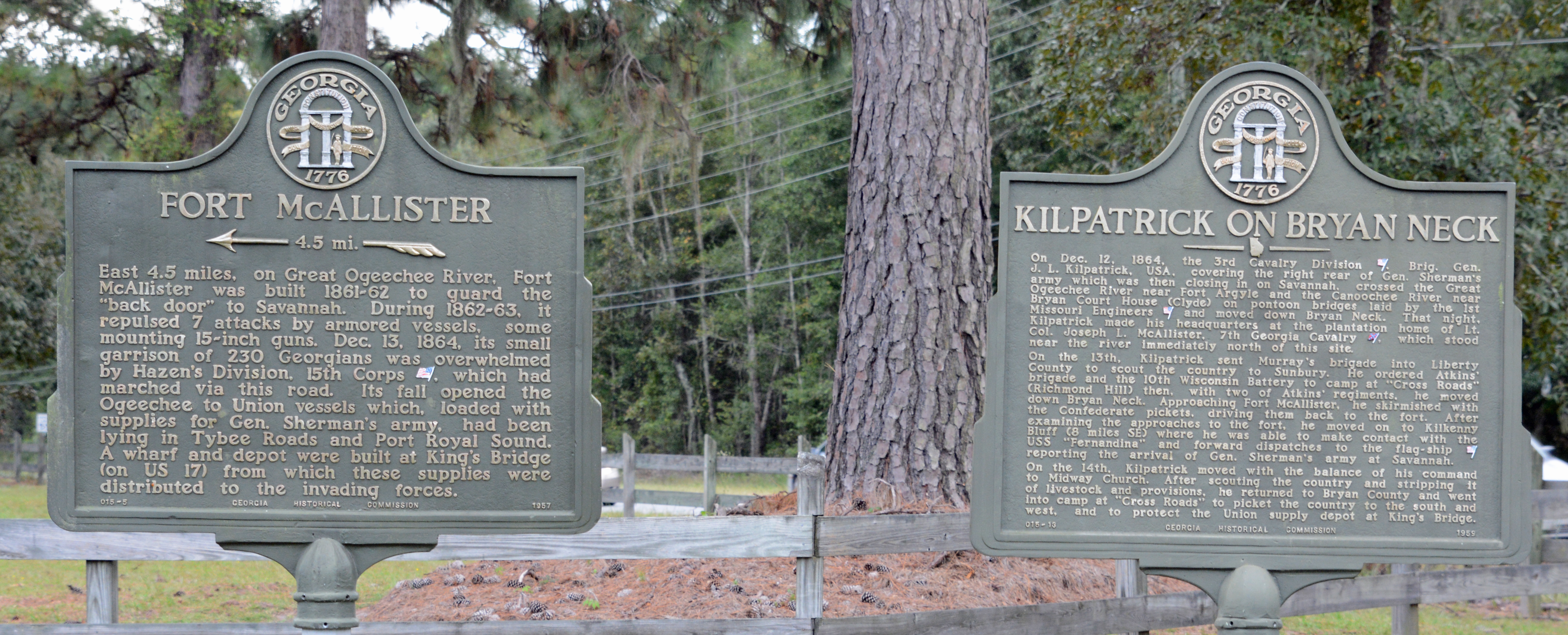
Historical markers a few miles away

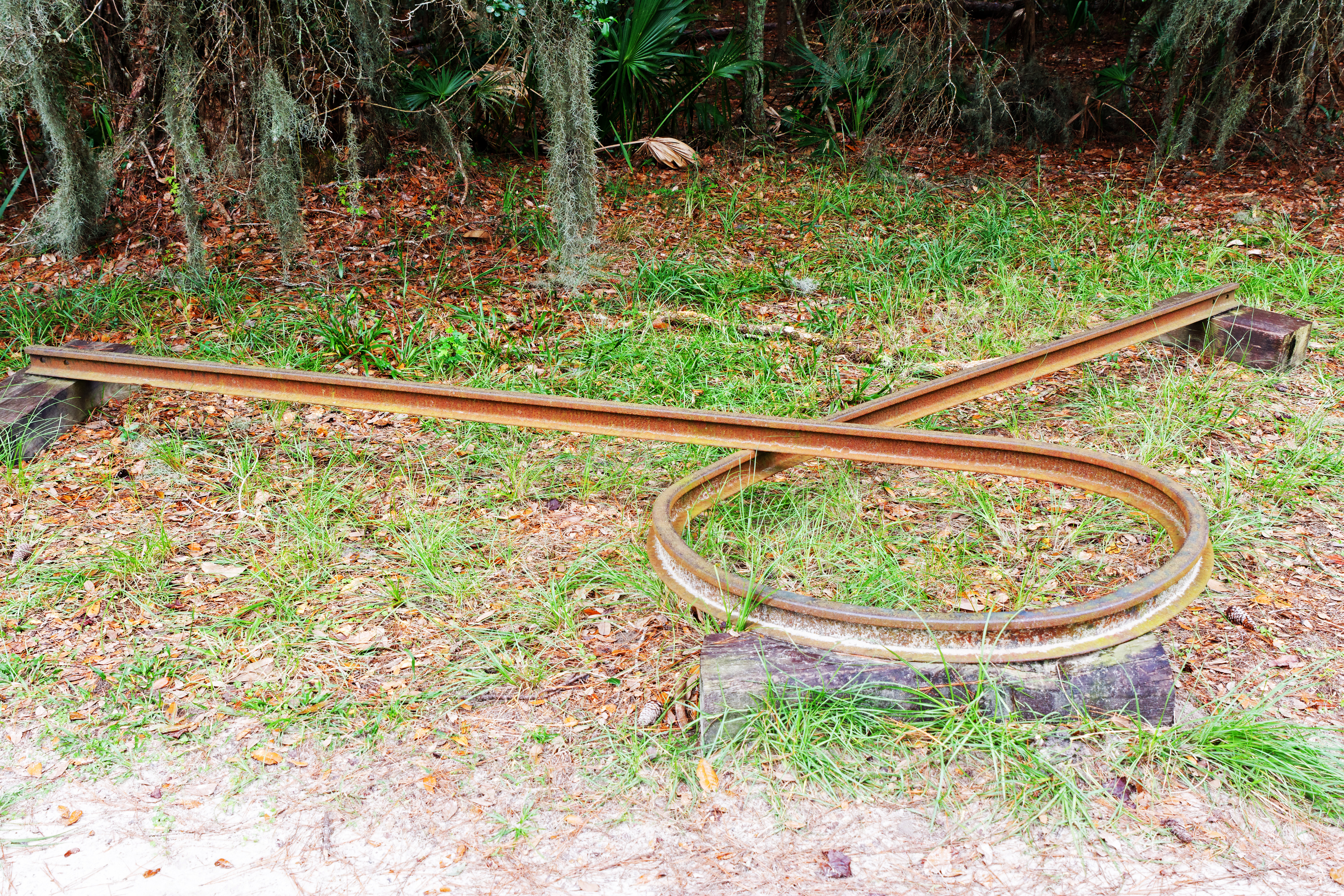
A Sherman necktie, mutilated railroad track

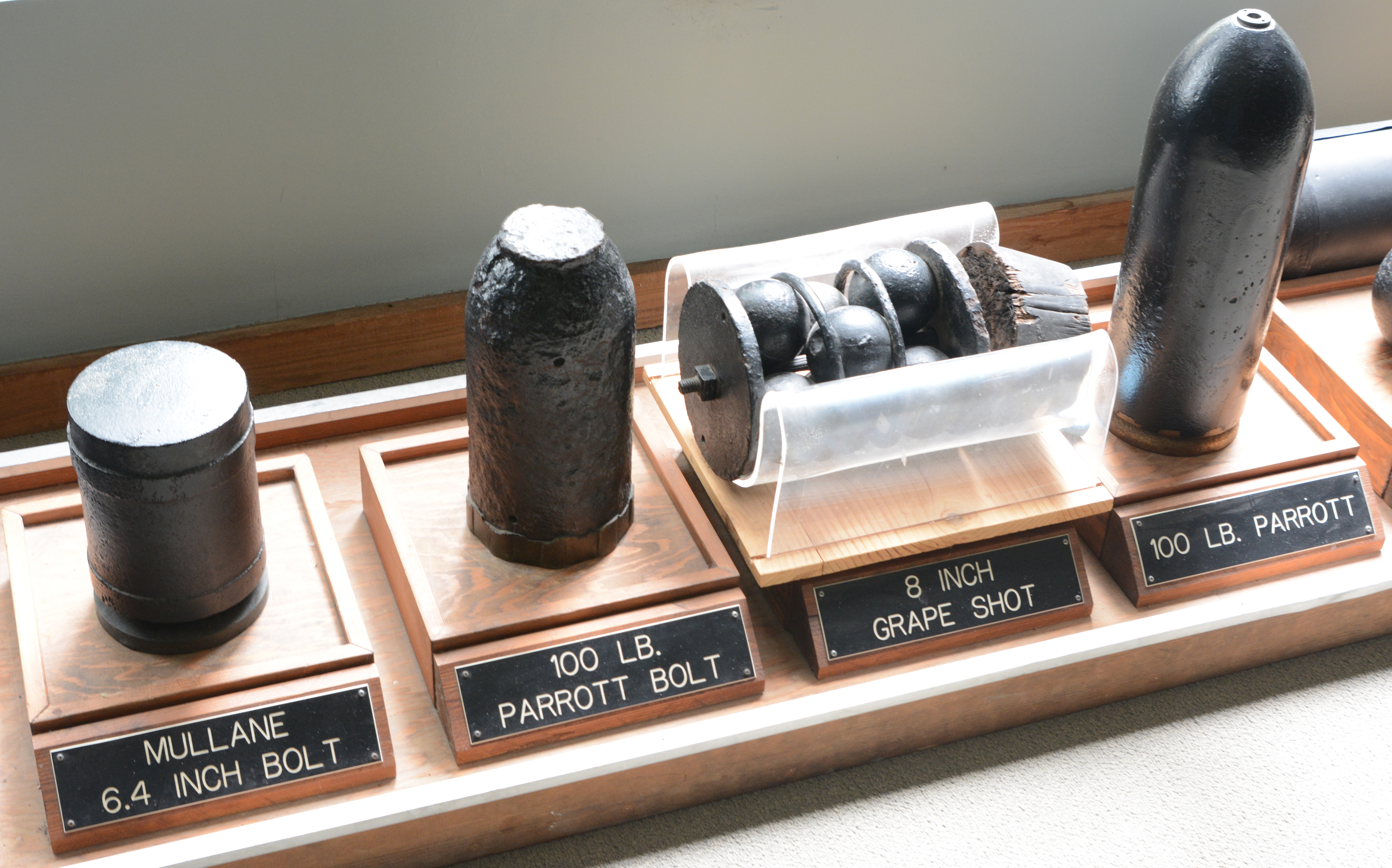
Some munitions on display in the museum

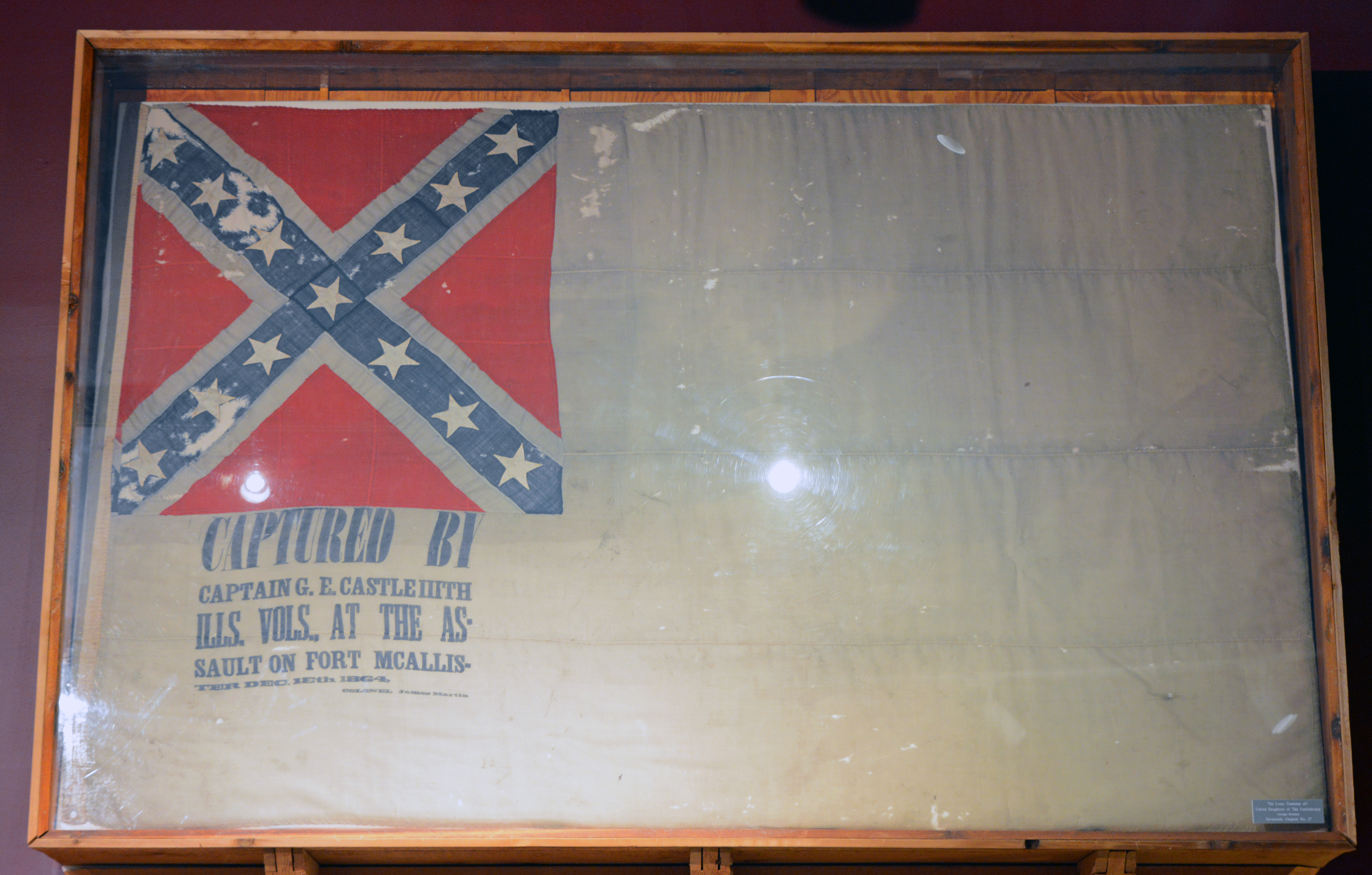
Captured Fort McAllister flag

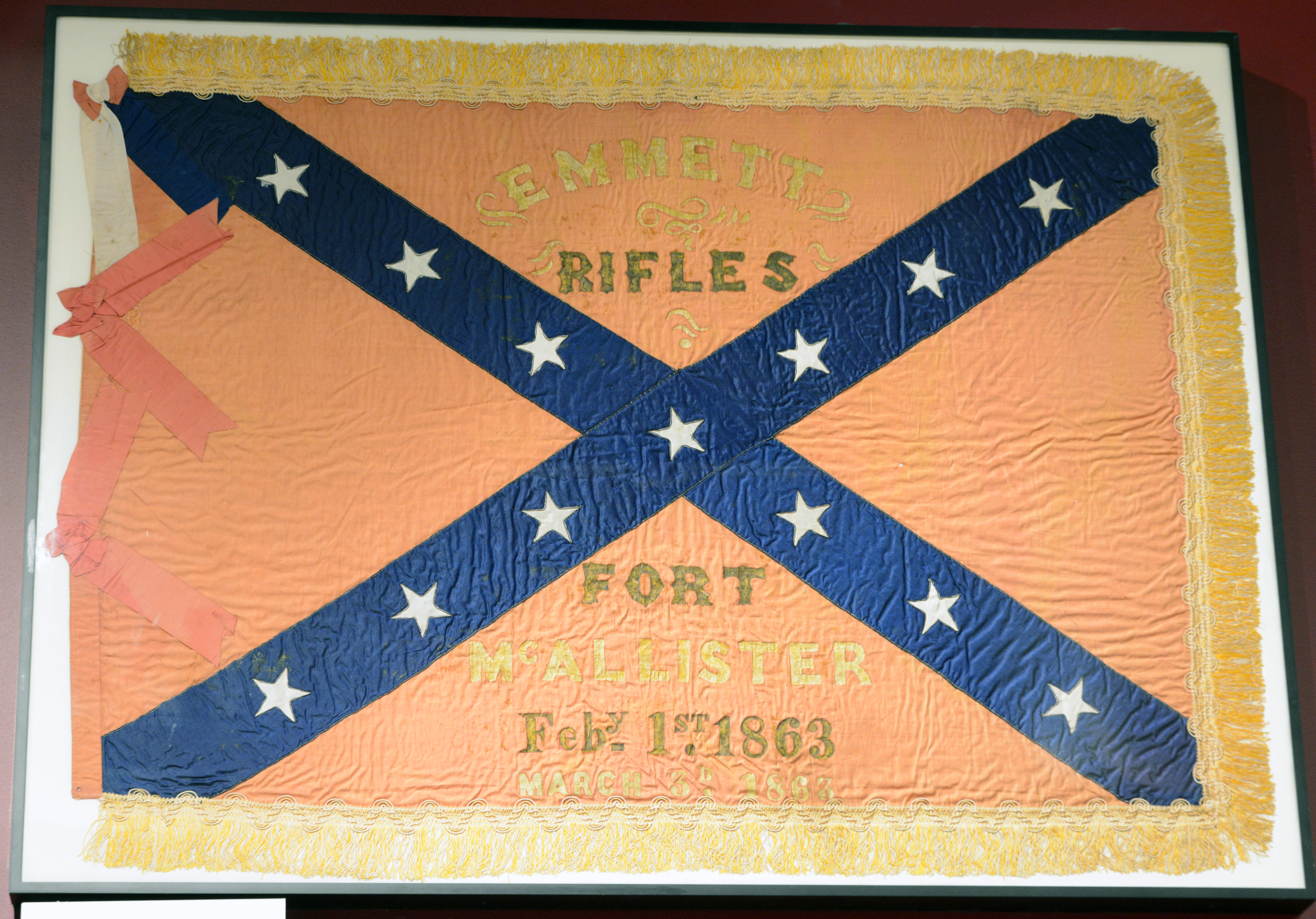
Flag of the Emmett Rifles

== See also ==
- Battle of Fort McAllister (1863)
- Battle of Fort McAllister (1864)
- Battle of Fort Pulaski
- National Register of Historic Places in Bryan County, Georgia
