= Georgia State Route 252 =

State highway in Georgia, United States

State Route 252
- Georgia State Route 252 highlighted in red

Route information
- Maintained by GDOT
- Length: 23.4 mi (37.7 km)

Major junctions
- West end: SR 40 Conn. in Folkston
- East end: US 17 / SR 25 / SR 110 in White Oak

Location
- Country: United States
- State: Georgia
- Counties: Charlton, Camden

Highway system
- Georgia State Highway System; Interstate; US; State; Special
← SR 251	→ SR 253

State Route 252 (SR 252) is a southwest–northeast state highway located in the southeastern part of the U.S. state of Georgia. It starts in Folkston and winds its way to White Oak.

== Route description ==
From the route's western start at SR 40 Conn in Folkston, the route runs east, through rural areas, to its eastern end at US 17/SR 25/SR 110 in White Oak. Known as MLk Dr in Folkston and Burnt Fort Road in Camden county, SR 252 runs past the D. Ray James Prison and provides the most direct route between Folkston and Brunswick, via US 17.

== History ==
The original western terminus of Georgia State Road 252 was on Love Street at US Routes 1/US 23/301 in Downtown Folkston and then moved onto Burnt Ford Road. Love Street continues west of that route as a local city street at Georgia State Routes 121 and 23.

== Major intersections ==
County	Location	mi	km	Destinations	Notes
Charlton	Folkston	0.0	0.0	SR 40 Conn. (Indian Trail) – Homeland	Western terminus
Camden	White Oak	23.4	37.7	US 17 / SR 25 / SR 110 – Woodbine, Kingsland, Brunswick	Eastern terminus
1.000 mi = 1.609 km; 1.000 km = 0.621 mi
