= Wadley, Georgia =

- City
- Location in Jefferson County and the state of Georgia
- Coordinates: 32°52′14″N 82°24′14″W
- Country: United States
- State: Georgia
- County: Jefferson

Area
  - Total: 4.60 sq mi (11.91 km^{2})
  - Land: 4.56 sq mi (11.80 km^{2})
  - Water: 0.042 sq mi (0.11 km^{2})
- Elevation: 253 ft (77 m)

Population (2020)
  - Total: 1,643
  - Density: 360.6/sq mi (139.23/km^{2})
- Time zone: UTC-5 (Eastern (EST))
  - Summer (DST): UTC-4 (EDT)
- ZIP code: 30477
- Area code: 478
- FIPS code: 13-79864
- GNIS feature ID: 0356616
- Website: https://wadleyga.gov/

Wadley is a city in Jefferson County, Georgia, United States. The population was 1,643 in 2020.

== History ==
The community was named for William Morill Wadley, a railroad official.

The Georgia General Assembly incorporated Wadley as a town in 1876. It was incorporated as a city in 1970.

== Geography ==
Wadley is located at 32°52′14″N 82°24′14″W (32.870491, -82.403756).

According to the United States Census Bureau, the city has a total area of 4.6 square miles (12 km^{2}), of which 4.6 square miles (12 km^{2}) is land and 0.1 square miles (0.26 km^{2}) (1.09%) is water.

== Demographics ==
Historical population
Census	Pop.	Note	%±
1880	281		—
1890	522		85.8%
1900	630		20.7%
1910	872		38.4%
1920	1,126		29.1%
1930	1,055		−6.3%
1940	1,133		7.4%
1950	1,624		43.3%
1960	1,898		16.9%
1970	1,989		4.8%
1980	2,438		22.6%
1990	2,473		1.4%
2000	2,088		−15.6%
2010	2,061		−1.3%
2020	1,643		−20.3%
U.S. Decennial Census; 1850-1870 1870-1880; 1890-1910 1920-1930; 1940 1950 1960; 1970 1980 1990; 2000 2010

=== 2020 census ===
As of the 2020 census, Wadley had a population of 1,643. The median age was 47.0 years. 20.1% of residents were under the age of 18 and 24.2% of residents were 65 years of age or older. For every 100 females there were 78.8 males, and for every 100 females age 18 and over there were 75.8 males age 18 and over.

0.0% of residents lived in urban areas, while 100.0% lived in rural areas.

There were 675 households in Wadley, of which 28.6% had children under the age of 18 living in them. Of all households, 26.8% were married-couple households, 17.2% were households with a male householder and no spouse or partner present, and 49.6% were households with a female householder and no spouse or partner present. About 35.4% of all households were made up of individuals and 17.5% had someone living alone who was 65 years of age or older. There were 381 families residing in the city.

There were 809 housing units, of which 16.6% were vacant. The homeowner vacancy rate was 1.2% and the rental vacancy rate was 2.8%.

Wadley racial composition as of 2020
Race	Num.	Perc.
White (non-Hispanic)	262	15.95%
Black or African American (non-Hispanic)	1,281	77.97%
Native American	1	0.06%
Asian	8	0.49%
Other/Mixed	29	1.77%
Hispanic or Latino	62	3.77%

== See also ==
- Central Savannah River Area
