= White Oak, Georgia =

Unincorporated community in Georgia, U.S.

White Oak
- Unincorporated community
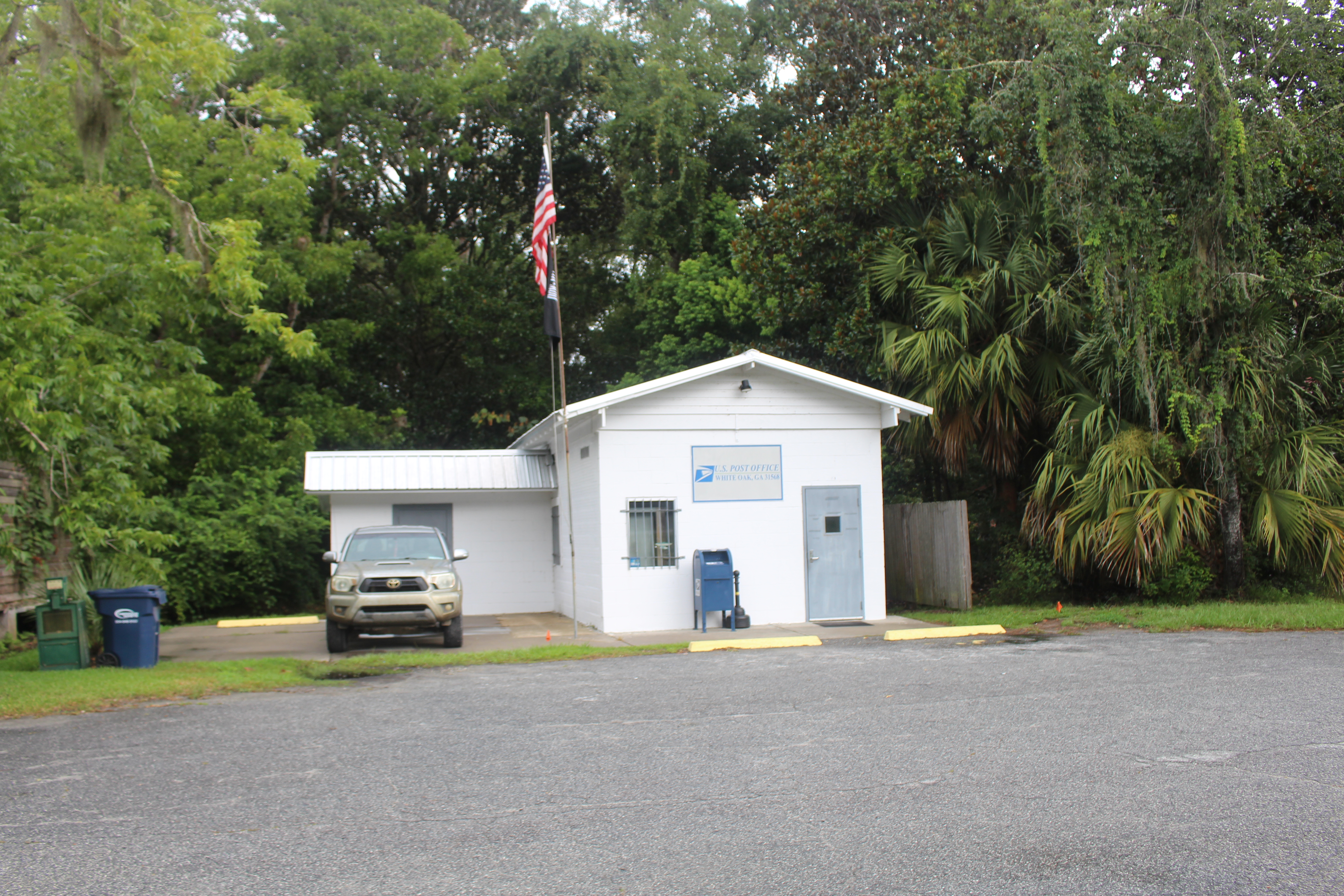
- White Oak Post Office

- Location in the State of Georgia
- Coordinates: 31°01′55″N 81°43′51″W
- Country: United States
- State: Georgia
- County: Camden
- Post office established: 1894
- Elevation: 13 ft (4.0 m)

Population
  - Total: 719 (ZCTA 31,568)
- ZIP Code: 31568
- Area code: 912

White Oak is an unincorporated community in Camden County, Georgia, United States. It is located along the coastal highway corridor in the southeastern corner of the state and forms part of the Brunswick Metropolitan Statistical Area. The ZIP Code for White Oak is 31568.

== History ==
The community took its name from nearby White Oak Creek. A post office called White Oak was established in 1894 and remained in operation for over a century. In 1924, local businessman Edgar Allen Poe McCarthy constructed the Tarboro Mercantile Company Warehouse along U.S. Route 17. The building remains a prominent local landmark and historic visual staple of the Georgia coastal highway.

=== Shaker Community (1898–1902) ===
In 1898, Joseph Slingerland, an elder from the Union Village Shaker community in Ohio, purchased 6,995 acres of land in White Oak to establish a southern Shaker colony. Shaker leadership intended to leverage the warmer coastal climate to benefit elderly members and diversify their agricultural output with crops such as rice, sweet potatoes, corn, and pumpkins. A secondary branch was briefly established at a plantation house in neighboring Glynn County, but financial constraints forced its sale, consolidating all regional operations to the White Oak headquarters.

The White Oak colony was the last Shaker community ever founded in the United States, as well as the shortest-lived. Because the Shakers practiced strict celibacy, the community relied entirely on external converts and the adoption of orphans to grow. Local residents proved unreceptive to Shaker theology and communal living practices. Unable to expand their membership or secure long-term financial stability, the remaining Shakers abandoned the property and returned to Ohio in 1902.

== Geography ==
White Oak is situated in northern Camden County just south of White Oak Creek, a tidal waterway flowing roughly 19 miles through the Satilla River Basin. It is positioned roughly midway between the incorporated cities of Woodbine to the south and Waverly to the north.

== Transportation ==
The community centers primarily around the commercial corridor of U.S. Route 17 (concurrent with Georgia State Route 25). White Oak also serves as the eastern terminus for Georgia State Route 252 (Burnt Fort Road), which travels due west toward Folkston.

== Demographics ==
Because White Oak is unincorporated, the United States Census Bureau does not track its population data as a standalone municipality; instead, metrics are gathered via the 31568 Zip Code Tabulation Area (ZCTA). According to census estimates, the ZCTA has a population of 719 residents with a median age of 55.4 years.

The racial makeup of the community is outlined below:

Race / Ethnicity	Percentage
White	72.2%
Black or African American	24.3%
Asian	2.8%
Two or more races	0.7%

== Education ==
Public education for White Oak residents is administered by the Camden County School District. Students living in the community are primarily zoned to Woodbine Elementary School in nearby Woodbine for grades K–5, before attending middle and high schools within the consolidated county system.
