= Georgia State Route 56 =

State highway in Georgia, United States

State Route 56
- Georgia State Route 56 highlighted in red

Route information
- Maintained by GDOT
- Length: 140.41 mi (225.97 km)

Major junctions
- South end: US 280 / SR 30 in Reidsville
- US 1 / SR 4 / SR 15 in Toombs Central; US 221 / SR 135 in Uvalda; US 280 / SR 30 in Mt. Vernon; I-16 northeast of Soperton; US 221 / SR 171 in Gillis Springs; US 1 / SR 4 / SR 57 in Swainsboro; US 80 / SR 26 in Swainsboro; US 25 / SR 24 / SR 80 / SR 121 in Waynesboro; I-520 in Augusta
- North end: US 25 / SR 121 in Augusta

Location
- Country: United States
- State: Georgia
- Counties: Tattnall, Toombs, Montgomery, Treutlen, Emanuel, Burke, Richmond

Highway system
- Georgia State Highway System; Interstate; US; State; Special
← SR 55	→ SR 57

State Route 56 (SR 56) is a 140.41-mile-long (225.97 km) inverted question mark-shaped state highway that travels south-to-north, with a western loop around Vidalia. It travels through portions of Tattnall, Toombs, Montgomery, Treutlen, Emanuel, Burke, and Richmond counties in the southeastern and east-central parts of the U.S. state of Georgia. The route connects the Reidsville and Augusta areas, via Swainsboro and Waynesboro.

== Route description ==
SR 56 begins at an intersection with US 280/SR 30 (West Brazell Street) in Reidsville, in Tattnall County. It travels to the west, crossing over the Ohoopee River, and enters Toombs County. A short distance after entering the county, the highway curves to the southwest. In New Branch, it intersects SR 178. In Toombs Central is US 1/SR 4. The highway continues to the southwest, before curving to the west-northwest. Then, it crosses into Montgomery County and enters Uvalda. In Uvalda, SR 56 intersects US 221/SR 135. South of this intersection, US 221/SR 135 run concurrent toward Hazlehurst. In Uvalda, SR 135 splits off, and US 221/SR 56 travel to the north-northwest to Mt. Vernon, where they have a second intersection with US 280/SR 30 (Spring Street). After leaving town, US 221/SR 56 travel north to an intersection with the southern terminus of SR 199. West of Tarrytown, they cross into Treutlen County, before entering Soperton. In town, they turn to the northeast. In the main part of town, they intersect SR 15/SR 29 (Main Street). At this intersection, SR 15 joins the concurrency for a short while. The three routes intersect SR 78 (Louisiana Street). Here SR 15/SR 78 head to the northwest, while SR 78 heads southeast. A short distance farther to the northeast, they intersect SR 46 (Metter Road). Just over 1 mile (1.6 km) after leaving town, they intersect the northern terminus of SR 227. Just before an interchange with Interstate 16 (I-16; Jim Gillis Historic Savannah Parkway), the two highways have an intersection with SR 86. They curve to the north-northeast and enter Gillis Springs, where US 221/SR 56 intersect the southern terminus of SR 171. Here, US 221/SR 171 head to the north, while SR 56 departs to the east. Then, it curves to the north-northeast and cross over the Ohoopee River for a second time, crossing into Emanuel County. It heads north, curves to the northeast, and crosses over the Little Ohoopee River. The highway continues to the northeast and intersects US 1/SR 4 (South Main Street), just before entering Swainsboro. There, it intersects US 80/SR 26 (West Main Street)/SR 57 (Kight Road). The four highways run concurrent to the northeast. At the intersection with US 1 Business/SR 4 Business (Main Street), SR 57 splits off to the southeast, along US 1 Business/SR 4 Business south. Approximately 1 mile (1.6 km) later, SR 56 splits off to the north-northeast. It passes through Modoc and meets SR 192 in Summertown. Farther to the northeast, it crosses over the Ogeechee River into Burke County and Midville. In town, it intersects SR 17 (Lee Street). A few blocks later, it meets the southern terminus of SR 305 (Jones Street). Leaving town, it heads north-northeast and curves to the northeast. SR 56 passes through rural areas of the county toward Waynesboro. Just before it enters town, it intersects SR 24/SR 80. The three routes head east-northeast into town and curve to the northeast to an intersection with US 25/SR 121 (Liberty Street). At this intersection, SR 24 departs to the south-southeast, while SR 56/SR 80 continue through town. Just before leaving Waynesboro, they meet US 25 Bypass/SR 121 Bypass. The two routes curve to the north-northeast, to the point where SR 56 and SR 80 split apart. SR 56 continues to the north-northeast and curves to the north-northwest. It curves back to the north-northeast and intersects the northern terminus of SR 23. Then, it curves around Southland Timber Lake, and meets the western terminus of SR 56 Spur (River Road). The highway crosses over McBean Creek into Richmond County and Augusta. It heads north and northwest, to meet the southern terminus of the now decommissioned SR 56 Spur (Tobacco Road), which leads to Augusta Regional Airport. North-northwest of here is an interchange with I-520 (Bobby Jones Expressway). The route continues to the north-northwest, and curves to the northwest, until it meets its northern terminus, a second intersection with US 25/SR 121 (Peach Orchard Road) in the southern part of Augusta.

The only portion of SR 56 that is part of the National Highway System, a system of routes determined to be the most important for the nation's economy, mobility, and defense, is the portion in Augusta that is north of Tobacco Road.

== Major intersections ==
County	Location	mi	km	Destinations	Notes
Tattnall	Reidsville	0.000	0.000	US 280 / SR 30 (West Brazell Street)	Southern terminus
Ohoopee River		2.693	4.334	W.A. Nail Bridge	
Toombs	New Branch	7.281	11.718	SR 178 – Lyons, State Prison	
Toombs	Toombs Central	13.259	21.338	US 1 / SR 4 / SR 15 – Baxley, Lyons	
Montgomery	Uvalda	23.858	38.396	US 221 south (South First Street) / SR 135 (First Street) – Hazlehurst, Vidalia	Southern end of US 221 concurrency
Montgomery	Mount Vernon	35.345	56.882	US 280 (Spring Street / SR 30) to I-16 – Glenwood, Vidalia	
Montgomery		40.540	65.243	SR 199 north / Hobson Wells Road south – Lothair	Southern terminus of SR 199; northern terminus of Hobson Wells Road
Treutlen	Soperton	49.539	79.725	SR 15 south / SR 29 (Main Street) to I-16 – Vidalia, Dublin	Southern end of SR 15 concurrency
Treutlen	Soperton	49.642	79.891	SR 15 north / SR 78 (Louisiana Avenue) – Adrian	Northern end of SR 15 concurrency
Treutlen	Soperton	50.016	80.493	SR 46 (Metter Road) – Metter	
Treutlen		53.160	85.553	SR 227 south – Metter	Northern terminus of SR 227
Treutlen		55.786	89.779	SR 86 – Adrian, Oak Park	
Treutlen		56.311	90.624	I-16 (Jim L. Gillis Highway / SR 404) – Macon, Savannah	I-16 exit 78
Treutlen	Gillis Springs	58.074	93.461	US 221 north / SR 171 north – Kite	Northern end of US 221 concurrency; southern terminus of SR 171
Emanuel		70.811	113.959	US 1 / SR 4 / SR 57 – Oak Park	Provides access to Emanuel Medical Center
Emanuel	Swainsboro	72.201	116.196	US 80 west (West Main Street / SR 26 west) / Kite Road north – Dublin, Wrightsville, Swainsboro Technical College	Southern end of US 80/SR 26 concurrency; southern terminus of Kite Road
Emanuel	Swainsboro	72.961	117.419	US 1 Bus. / SR 4 Bus. (Main Street) – Oak Park, Wadley	
Emanuel	Swainsboro	73.486	118.264	US 80 east (East Main Street / SR 26 east) – Statesboro, East Georgia State College	Northern end of US 80/SR 26 concurrency
Emanuel	Summertown	84.079	135.312	SR 192 east / Summertown Main Street west	Western terminus of SR 192; eastern terminus of Summertown Main Street
Burke	Midville	89.765	144.463	SR 17 (Lee Street) – Millen, Wadley	
Burke	Midville	89.922	144.715	SR 305 north (Jones Street) – Vidette	Southern terminus of SR 305
Burke		111.790	179.909	SR 24 west / SR 80 west – Louisville	Southern end of SR 24 and SR 80 concurrencies
Burke	Waynesboro	113.114	182.039	US 25 / SR 24 east / SR 121 (Liberty Street) – Millen, Statesboro, Augusta	Northern end of SR 24 concurrency
Burke	Waynesboro	114.411	184.127	US 25 Byp. / SR 121 Byp. (Burke Veterans Parkway) – Millen, Augusta, Burke County High School	
Burke		116.754	187.897	Frank M. Cates Bridge over Brier Creek	
Burke		117.683	189.392	SR 80 east – Plant Vogtle	Northern end of SR 80 concurrency
Burke		124.490	200.347	SR 23 south – Girard, Plant Vogtle	Northern terminus of SR 23
Burke		125.714	202.317	SR 56 Spur east (River Road)	Western terminus of SR 56 Spur
Richmond	Augusta	135.699	218.386	Tobacco Road	Former southern terminus of former SR 56 Spur
Richmond	Augusta	137.931	221.978	I-520 east (Bobby Jones Expressway east / SR 415 east) – Columbia S.C.	I-520 east exit 9
Richmond	Augusta	138.006	222.099	H.G. "T" Fulcher Memorial Bridge; crossing over I-520 (Bobby Jones Expressway / SR 415)	
Richmond	Augusta	138.130	222.299	I-520 west (Bobby Jones Expressway west / SR 415 west) – Atlanta	I-520 west exit 9
Richmond	Augusta	140.406	225.962	US 25 / SR 121 (Peach Orchard Road) / Tubman Home Road north	Northern terminus; southern terminus of northern segment of Tubman Home Road
1.000 mi = 1.609 km; 1.000 km = 0.621 mi: Concurrency terminus

== Special routes ==
=== Burke County spur route ===
State Route 56 Spur
- Location: Rural Burke County
- Length: 6.68 mi (10.75 km)

State Route 56 Spur (SR 56 Spur) is a 6.68-mile-long (10.75 km) spur route that exists entirely within the northeastern part of Burke County. It is known as River Road for its entire length.

It begins at an intersection with the SR 56 mainline, just southeast of McBean. It travels to the northeast for less than 1 mile (1.6 km). Then, it curves to the east-southeast for most of its route. It crosses over Boggy Gut Creek on an unnamed bridge. Finally, it heads southeast to meet its eastern terminus, an intersection with the eastern terminus of SR 80, northeast of Shell Bluff.

The entire route is in Burke County.

Location	mi	km	Destinations	Notes
	0.000	0.000	SR 56 – Waynesboro, Augusta	Western terminus
	6.680	10.750	SR 80 west – Waynesboro	Eastern terminus; eastern terminus of SR 80
1.000 mi = 1.609 km; 1.000 km = 0.621 mi

=== Augusta spur route ===
State Route 56 Spur
- Location: Augusta
- Length: 6.6 mi (10.6 km)
- Existed: 2014

State Route 56 Spur (SR 56 Spur) was a 6.6-mile-long (10.6 km) spur route of SR 56 that existed entirely within the southeastern part of Richmond County and the city limits of Augusta. Its west–east section was part of Tobacco Road. It was known as Doug Barnard Parkway for the rest of its length.

Its southern terminus was at an intersection with the SR 56 mainline (Mike Padgett Highway), where Tobacco Road continues past the spur's terminus. It traveled east on Tobacco Road. Then, at the eastern terminus of Tobacco Road, it turned north onto Doug Barnard Parkway. This was at the main entrance to Augusta Regional Airport. The highway paralleled the western edge of the airport before curving to the northwest. Then, it had an interchange with Interstate 520 (I-520; Bobby Jones Expressway). After a crossing over Rocky Creek, a curve to the northeast, and a crossing over Butler Creek, it had a curve to the northwest just before it met its northern terminus, an intersection with US 1/US 25/US 78/US 278/SR 10/SR 121 (Gordon Highway) in the central part of Augusta. Here, the roadway continues as Molly Pond Road.

The highway was decommissioned in 2014.

The entire route was in Augusta, Richmond County.

mi	km	Destinations	Notes
0.0	0.0	SR 56 (Mike Padgett Highway) / Tobacco Road west to I-20 / I-520 – Waynesboro, Augusta	Southern terminus; roadway continued as Tobacco Road.
3.6	5.8	I-520 (Bobby Jones Expressway / SR 415) to I-20 – Atlanta	I-520 exit 10
6.6	10.6	US 1 / US 25 / US 78 (US 278 / SR 10 / SR 121 / Gordon Highway) / Molly Pond Road north – Downtown Augusta, Medical District, Grovetown	Northern terminus of SR 56 Spur; roadway continued as Molly Pond Road.
1.000 mi = 1.609 km; 1.000 km = 0.621 mi
