= Georgia State Route 4 =

State highway in eastern Georgia

State Route 4

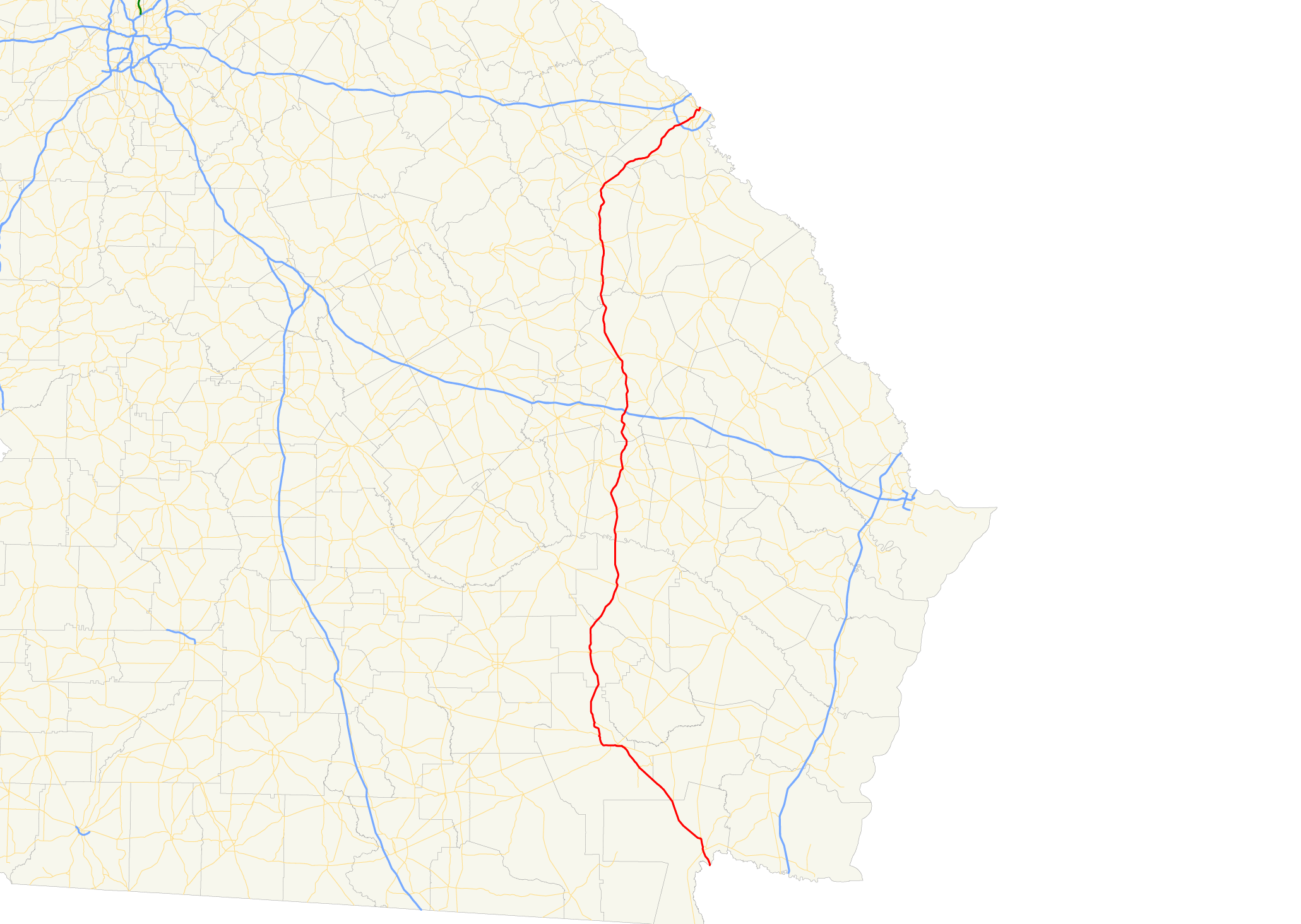

Route information
- Maintained by GDOT
- Existed: 1929–present

Major junctions
- South end: US 1 / US 23 / US 301 / SR 15 at the Florida state line northwest of Hilliard, FL
- US 301 / SR 23 on the Folkston–Homeland line; US 82 / SR 520 in Waycross; US 84 / SR 38 in Waycross; US 23 / SR 19 north of Alma; I-16 in Oak Park; US 221 / SR 47 in Wrens; I-520 / SR 540 in Augusta; US 1 / US 78 / US 278 / SR 10 in Augusta
- North end: US 25 Bus. at the South Carolina state line on the Augusta, GA–North Augusta, SC line

Location
- Country: United States
- State: Georgia
- Counties: Charlton, Ware, Bacon, Appling, Toombs, Emanuel, Jefferson, Richmond

Highway system
- Georgia State Highway System; Interstate; US; State; Special
← SR 3	→ SR 5

State Route 4 (SR 4) is a state highway in the eastern part of the U.S. state of Georgia. Except for its portion north of U.S. Route 78 (US 78), it is completely concurrent for its entire length with U.S. Route 1 (US 1). It traverses south-to-north through portions of Charlton, Ware, Bacon, Appling, Toombs, Emanuel, Jefferson, and Richmond counties in the southeastern and east-central parts of the state. The highway begins at the Florida state line, on US 1/US 23/US 301/SR 15 at the St. Marys River. It travels to its northern terminus at the South Carolina state line, on the Augusta–North Augusta, South Carolina city line, on US 25 Business (US 25 Bus.) at the Savannah River.

== Route description ==
=== Charlton County ===
SR 4 begins at the Florida state line, at a bridge over the St. Marys River, which is south-southeast of Folkston. This is where US 1/US 23/US 301 enter Georgia from Florida. US 1, US 23, US 301, SR 4, and SR 15 travel north as the Public Safety and Veterans Highway through rural parts of Charlton County. They curve to the northwest for a brief portion. Just before entering Folkston, where they use the Second Street name, they resume their north direction. They have an intersection with the southern end of Third Street, a former portion of US . They intersect with (Main Street). One block later is Love Street, a former portion of SR 252. Just north of Garden Street, they curve to the northeast. They then intersect SR 23/SR 121, which join the concurrency. This is one of a few seven-highway concurrencies in the state. The seven highways continue to the northeast. Just after curving back to the northwest, they intersect the western end of SR 40 Connector (SR 40 Conn.; Indian Trail). At this intersection, they pass the Charlton County Library. They then use the Okefenokee Trail as their path. They cross over Clay Branch just before intersecting Bowery Lane and Homeland Park Road. They leave Folkston and enter Homeland. US 301 and SR 23 split and continue to the north, while US 1, US 23, SR 4, SR 15, and SR 121 curve to the northwest on the Woodpecker Trail. They overpass railroad tracks, pass Dogwood Lane, leave Homeland and, resume through rural parts of the county. They cross over Little Spanish Creek and then Winding Branch. They intersect Crews Road and Old Dixie Highway, a former portion of US 1. Just after this intersection is a crossing over Spanish Creek. They curve to the northwest. They cross over Melton Branch. Then, in Racepond, SR 15/SR 121 splits off to the northeast, while US 1, US 23, and SR 4 continue to the northwest and enter Ware County.

=== Ware County ===
US 1, US 23, and SR 4 cross over Gum Slough and then curve more to the northwest. They travel through the Dixon Memorial State Forest. They curve to the north-northwest and then intersect SR 177. They cross over Mill Creek before entering the southeastern part of Waycross.

Immediately, they pass an office of the Georgia Department of Corrections. Just before an intersection with Osburn Road, they curve back to the northwest. Just past The Mall at Waycross, they curve to the west-northwest. Just before an intersection with City Boulevard, they curve back to the north. They intersect the southern end of US 1 Bus./US 23 Bus./SR 4 Bus. (Memorial Drive) and US 82/SR 520 (South Georgia Parkway). US 1/US 23/SR 4 turn left onto US 82/SR 520 and travel concurrently with them. The five-highway concurrency travels to the northwest. An intersection with Wilkerson Street leads to Memorial Stadium. The next street, Blackwell Street. Between an intersection of Amanda Street and Morton Avenue, they cross over the city's drainage canal. Pass an intersection with Lee Street leads to the downtown business district. Pass the intersection with Brunel Street which leads to Obediah's Okefenok and Swamp Road. At the intersection with Stephenson Street, the five highways curve to the northwest. On this curve, they travel on a bridge over Haines Avenue, some railroad tracks, and US 84/SR 38 (Plant Avenue). Immediately after this bridge, they curve back to the west-northwest. At McDonald Street, US 84 and SR 38 join the concurrency. The seven highways, US 1, US 23, US 82, US 84, SR 4, SR 38, and SR 520, continue to the northwest. At the intersection with Nicholls Street, they curve to the west-northwest and travel on a bridge over railroad tracks. Just pass this bridge, they curve to the northwest. At Victory Drive, US 84 and SR 38 depart. Past this intersection, there is one with South Augusta Avenue. Here, the highways pass South Georgia State College's Waycross campus. Between an intersection with University Boulevard and Anita Street, they leave the city limits of Waycross.

West of Anita Street, they curve back to the west-northwest. They cross over Kettle Creek. A short distance later, they curve north. They intersect SR 122 (Carswell Avenue). They curve to the northeast and travel on a bridge over some railroad tracks. Immediately afterward, they travel on a bridge over Albany Avenue. the highways curve to the northwest and come to an intersection with Scapa Road. Here, US 1, US 23, and SR 4 turn right to the northeast, while US 82 and SR 520 continue straight ahead. Almost immediately, they intersect with Fulford Road, which leads to the Ware County Sheriff's Office, the Southland Waste Transfer Station, the Ware County Emergency Management Agency, and the Waycross Regional Youth Detention Center. The three highways curve to the northwest and pass the Waycross–Ware County Industrial Park West. They curve to the west-northwest for a short distance and then curve northeast. They intersect US 1 Bus./US 23 Bus./SR 4 Bus. (Alma Highway). The mainline highways head to the northwest and cross over Cox Creek. Almost immediately, they cross over the Satilla River on the Charles Ray King Memorial Bridge. They curve due north. On a curve back to the northwest, they cross over Dryden Creek. They curve to the north and travel through Dixie Union. They curve to the northeast and travel on a bridge over Crawley Road and some railroad tracks. At an intersection with Jamestown Road and Alma–Waycross Highway, they enter Bacon County.

=== Bacon County ===
US 1, US 23, and SR 4 cross over Little Hurricane Creek on the PFC Clarence Loran Gaskins Memorial Bridge and curve to the northwest. Upon entering Alma, they pass Bacon County High School Just south of an intersection with Floyd Street and Radio Station Road, they begin a curve to the northeast. Just north of this intersection, they meet the former SR 4 Alternate (SR 4 Alt.; South Dixon Street). North of 17th Street, they pass the Alma campus of Coastal Pines Technical College. The next block is an intersection with SR 32 (16th Street). Just north of 11th Street, the concurrency passes the Alma/Bacon County Public Library. Between 8th Street and 6th Street, the highways begin a curve to the northwest and pass the Alma Bacon County Welcome Center. They cross over Bear Branch and meet Magnolia Drive. One block later, they intersect the former SR 4 Alt. (North Dixon Street) and Camellia Drive. Here, they curve to the north. An intersection with Cumberland Road leads to the Bacon County Primary School. A short distance later, they curve to the northeast. They leave the city limits of Alma and cross over Hurricane Creek on the Curtis Lee Marion Bridge. They curve due north and travel on the Jauquion R. "Rab" Tanner Bridge<!-. The highways curve back to the northeast just before an intersection with SR 19. Here, US 23 departs the concurrency on SR 19. US 1 and SR 4 continue northeast and cross over Big Satilla Creek and enter Appling County.

=== Appling County ===
US 1 and SR 4 continue to the northeast. Just before an intersection with Versie Aldridge Road and Cauley Road, they curve northeast. Just before an intersection with Buck Head Road, they continue northeast. An intersection with Airport Road which leads to the Baxley Municipal Airport. The highways cross over Blackwater Creek and then curve back to the north-northeast. They cross over Sweetwater Creek and enter Baxley. An intersection with Johns Lane leads to Appling County Elementary School. At an intersection with Second Street, they begin a second concurrency with SR 15. An intersection with Bay Street which leads to Lake Mayers Public Park. US 1, SR 4, and SR 15 cross over some railroad tracks just before intersecting US 341/SR 27 (Parker Street). Around an intersection with Ivey Street, the three highways curve to the northwest. At Brobston Street, they curve back to the northeast. At an intersection with Sursson Street, they temporarily leave the city limits of Baxley. At an intersection with Nails Ferry Road, they re-enter the city. After curving back to the northwest, they leave Baxley for the final time. They cross over Tenmile Creek. They curve due north and cross over Little Tenmile Creek. After crossing over Bay Creek, they cross over an industrial railway. An intersection with West River Road leads to Deen's Landing, an Altamaha River waterway public landing. They pass a picnic area just before crossing over the Altamaha River on the Joseph Simmons Alexander Sr. Memorial Bridge to enter Toombs County.

=== Toombs County ===
US 1, SR 4, and SR 15 continue northeast. After crossing over Williams Creek, they enter the unincorporated community of English Eddy. They curve to the northwest. Just before an intersection with SR 147 and Cedar Crossing Road, they curve to a more northern direction. After leaving English Eddy, they curve to the northeast. After crossing over Cobb Creek, they curve back to the northwest. After curving to the north, they enter the unincorporated community of Toombs Central. There, they intersect SR 56. Then, they pass Toombs Central Elementary School and the Toombs County Recreation Department. After leaving Toombs Central, they curve northwest. In the unincorporated community of South Thompson, they begin a curve back to the northeast. They intersect SR 29. Here, SR 15 splits off onto SR 29. US 1 and SR 4 curve to the northeast and cross over Rocky Creek. They curve back to the north and cross over Little Rocky Creek. They then travel through Santa Claus. Approximately 0.7 miles (1.1 km) later, they enter Lyons. They pass Lyons Upper Elementary School and then curve to the northeast. They meet SR 178 (South Victory Drive). They begin a curve northwest. An intersection with South Washington Street leads to Partin Park and the Lyons Recreation Department. They intersect US 280/SR 30 (Liberty Avenue). Just after this intersection, US 1 and SR 4 enter downtown Lyons. They cross over some railroad tracks. Immediately afterward, they intersect SR 292 and SR 152 (Broad Street). After leaving downtown, they pass the Lyons Police Department. Intersections with Cleveland Avenue and Toombs Avenue. After leaving Lyons, they cross over Swift Creek and curve to the northeast. They intersect SR 130 and Resmando Road. The roadway curves to the northeast for a short distance and then resume their north direction. They cross over Pendleton Creek, travel through rural areas with agricultural land on both sides of the roadway before entering Emanuel County.

=== Emanuel County ===
US 1 and SR 4 immediately curve northwest. Just before Harrell Cemetery Road, they curve back to the north. They enter Oak Park. They begin a curve back to the northwest. Immediately after this curve begins, they cross over Reedy Creek. Then, they curve back to the north and intersect SR 46/SR 86. Here, SR 46 joins the concurrency. The three highways curve to the northeast and cross over the Ohoopee River. They curve back to the north and meet a former portion of SR 46. Then, they have an interchange with Interstate 16 (I-16; Jim L. Gillis Highway). Just past this interchange, SR 46 splits off to the east. As of this point, they are known as Bill English Highway. Just after beginning a curve to the northwest, they leave Oak Park. They have an intersection with SR 192 and New Hope Church Road. The concurrency curves back to the north and crosses over Jacks Creek. Just south of Ivy W. Rountree Road, they curve back to the northeast. Just before curving back to the north, SR 57 joins the concurrency. They curve to the northwest and then intersect SR 297. Here, they take on the Larry J. "Butch" Parrish Parkway name. They intersect US 1 Bus./SR 4 Bus., which leads to Swainsboro. They briefly enter the city limits of Swainsboro. There, they intersect Empire Expressway and travel on a bridge over some railroad tracks. Just after this, they cross over Crooked Creek. They intersect SR 56 and curve to the north. After an intersection with US 80/SR 26 on the southwestern edge of the city, US 1, SR 4, and SR 56 travel just to the west of Holloways Pond. They curve to the north, very briefly re-enter the city, and then travel just to the west of Emanuel County Airport. They curve back to the northeast and intersect Kight Road, a former segment of SR 57. At this intersection, SR 57 splits off to the northwest. They then meet US 1 Bus./SR 4 Bus. The highways curve back to the north. They meet a former portion of US 1 that travels through Dellwood just before intersecting Dellwood Connector, which leads to Dellwood. On the northern side of Dellwood, they meet this former portion of the highway. They curve north direction and then back to the northeast. They travel through the unincorporated community of Blundale. The highways curve to the northwest and then back to the north. Then, they cross over Rocky Creek to enter Jefferson County.

=== Jefferson County ===
SR 4 curve to the northeast and intersect US 1 Bus./SR 4 Bus. and Kennedy Road. Cross over Williamson Swamp Creek and enter Wadley. Just after a curve northwest, travel on a bridge over some railroad tracks, and intersect SR 78 and US 319 (East Calhoun Street). The highway curves back to the north, then northwest, just south of an intersection with Martin Luther King Jr. Boulevard and Lincoln Park Road. Just after this curve, they intersect US 1 Bus./SR 4 Bus. And head to the north crossing over Boggy Gut Creek. Intersecting with Moxley–Bartow Road and Pete Smith Road, the latter of which leads to the unincorporated community of Moxley. In Aldreds, an intersection with Walden Brett Road leads to the unincorporated community of Pine Hill. The highway curves due north direction and meets the former portion of US 1 before crossing over the Ogeechee River. It curves to the northwest and enters Louisville. Immediately, has an intersection with US 1 Bus./SR 4 Bus. and Bob Culvern Road. This intersection is just west of Louisville Municipal Airport. Then an intersection with SR 17 and Midville Road. Here, SR 17 joins the concurrency. It travels east of Lake Marion and intersects SR 24 (Mulberry Street). An intersection with School Street, just before an intersection with Walnut Street and Middleground Road, the roadway curves to the northwest, then curves back to the north and intersect US 221 and US 1 Bus./SR 4 Bus. (Peachtree Street). Here, US 221 joins the concurrency. The four highways travel north between the Jefferson County Jail and Law Enforcement Facility and the Louisville Golf Club, passing the Thomas Jefferson Academy. They then pass the Jefferson County Health Center. They curve to the northwest and intersect Clark Mill By-Pass. Just north of this intersection, the roadway leaves Louisville. It bends to a more northern direction and passes Jones Pond. It curves to the northeast and intersects with SR 296. They pass Jefferson County High School just before intersecting Warrior Trail. It passes Adams Lake and curves to the northeast before crossing over Big Creek. It enters Wrens and curves to the north. Immediately, intersecting SR 88/SR 540 (Fall Line Freeway), which both join the concurrency. The six highways head into the main part of the city. They cross over some railroad tracks and curve to the northeast crossing over Brushy Creek. They curve to the north and intersect Howard Street and Thomson Highway. Here, SR 17 splits off onto Thomson Highway. Then, they intersect SR 80 (Broad Street). Here, SR 88 splits off to the right. The four highways continue to the northeast and pass Wrens Middle School. The concurrency curves to the northeast and intersects Quaker Road, which functions as a northern bypass of the city. A short distance later, they intersect SR 47. Here, US 221 splits off to the northwest. US 1, SR 4, and SR 540 cross over Reedy Creek on the Floyd L. Norton Memorial Bridge. An intersection with Woodland Academy Road and the Camp Ground Road leads to WCES TV 20. They parallel the southeastern edge of Fort Gordon, then cross over Brier Creek and enter Richmond County and the city limits of Augusta.

=== Richmond County ===
SR 4, curves to the northeast and crosses over Boggy Gut Creek. Curving back to the north, it crosses over Sandy Run Creek. The highway leaves Augusta, enter the city limits of Blythe, and temporarily leave the edge of Fort Gordon. It intersects Church Street and curves to the northeast. On this curve it intersects SR 88 and Hoods Chapel Road. Not actually an intersection, SR 88 is just an extremely short connector to it. SR4 leaves Blythe and re-enters Augusta. It curves to the north and crosses over South Prong Creek. The highway parallels the southeastern edge of Fort Gordon and begins to curve back to the northeast. On this curve, they cross over Spirit Creek. It intersects with Willis Foreman Road, which is a connector to US 25/SR 121. This is before an interchange with Tobacco Road, which leads to Fort Gordon's Gate 5. Just after this interchange, it has an intersection with a former portion of US 1. Crossing over Butler Creek, it meets another former portion of US 1, and curves to the north to an intersection with Meadowbrook Drive and Barton Chapel Road. The roadway begins a curve back to the northeast. At an interchange with I-520 (Bobby Jones Expressway; and its unsigned companion designation SR 415), both SR 540 and the Fall Line Freeway end. US 1 and SR 4 pass Augusta Technical College and then intersect Lumpkin Road, which functions as a bypass south of the main part of Augusta. They then meet Wheeless Road, which helps connect the southern and central parts of the city. They pass Hillcrest Memorial Cemetery before meeting Richmond Hill Road. The highway crosses over Rocky Creek just before intersecting US 78/US 278/SR 10 (Gordon Highway). Here, US 1 turns right onto US 78/US 278/SR 10, while SR 4 begins a curve to the northeast and takes on the Milledgeville Road name. It passes Wilkinson Gardens Elementary School. At an intersection with Olive Road, the local name changes to Martin Luther King Jr. Boulevard. At an intersection with 15th Avenue and 15th Street, SR 4 turns left onto 15th Street. Just past an intersection with Government Road and Carver Drive, there's a partial interchange with Poplar Street and Wrightsboro Road. There is no access from Poplar Street or Wrightsboro Road to SR 4 or from southbound SR 4 to the local streets. Then, the highway travels on the Rosa T. Beard Memorial Bridge over Poplar Street, Wrightsboro Road, and some railroad tracks. Here, it begins traveling along the southwestern edge of the Medical District. It intersects Central Avenue. It skirts along the eastern edge of Paine College. At an intersection with Laney Walker Boulevard, which leads to the college and the Health Sciences campus of Augusta University, the highway enters the Medical District proper. It intersects Pope Avenue and Harper Street. At an intersection with Walton Way, SR 4 turns right and follows Walton Way to the north. It meets St. Sebastian Way. An intersection with D'Antignac Street leads to the main and emergency entrances of University Hospital. The highway intersects 13th Street. Here, SR 4 turns left and follows that street north. Immediately, it crosses over Augusta Canal and leaves the Medical District. It intersects with Independence Drive, crosses over some railroad tracks and then passes the John S. Davidson Fine Arts Magnet School. It then crosses over Hawks Gully, a side tributary of Augusta Canal. Just after this crossing is an intersection with Telfair Street. It travels under a bridge that carries SR 28 (John C. Calhoun Expressway). An intersection with Greene Street leads to Sacred Heart Cultural Center and Augusta Canal Discovery Center. It intersects Ellis Street, which functions like an alternate route for most of the east–west streets in downtown. The highway then intersects US 25 Bus. (Broad Street), which leads to the city's visitor center. Here, US 25 Bus. joins SR 4 in a concurrency. The highways meet Jones Street, the eastbound lanes of SR 104. The next intersection is with Reynolds Street, the westbound lanes of SR 104. They cross over the Savannah River on the James U. Jackson Memorial Bridge. Here, SR 4 ends and US 25 Bus. enters North Augusta, South Carolina.

=== National Highway System ===
The entire length of SR 4 is part of the National Highway System, a system of routes determined to be the most important for the nation's economy, mobility, and defense.

== History ==
=== 1920s ===
The roadway that would eventually become SR 4 was established at least as early as 1919 as part of SR 15 from the Florida state line through Waycross and to Alma, an unnumbered road from Alma, SR 17 from Swainsboro to Louisville, and another unnumbered road from Louisville to Augusta. By September 1921, SR 32 was proposed on the Alma–Baxley segment. SR 17 was proposed from Baxley through Lyons to Swainsboro. It was also placed on the Louisville–Wrens segment. SR 24 was designated on the Louisville–Augusta segment, via Wrens. By October 1926, US 1 was designated on the current path. The route of SR 15 between Alma and Hazlehurst, including its concurrency with US 1, was shifted to the east-northeast. SR 32 was designated on the Alma–Baxley segment, with a concurrency with US 1/SR 15 from Alma north to a point southwest of Baxley. By October 1929, SR 4 was designated on the current path. The eastern terminus of SR 32 was truncated to Alma. SR 15's southern terminus was removed from US 1 and truncated to the northern end of its former concurrency with US 1 north of Alma, at what is the current northern end of the concurrency that US 1/SR 4 have with US 23. SR 24's Louisville–Augusta segment was shifted to the southeast to travel between Louisville and Waynesboro. SR 17's southern terminus was truncated to Wrens.

=== 1930s ===
In January 1932, the southern terminus of SR 17 was extended on US 1 and SR 4 from south-southeast of Wrens to Louisville and then to the southeast to Midville and then east-southeast to Millen. In the first third of 1937, SR 23 was extended west-southwest from Folkston to Saint George, but there was no indication of a concurrency with US 1/SR 4. The 1938 GDOT map was the first one that had an inset map of Augusta. It indicated that US 1 and SR 4 entered the main part of the city on Deans Bridge Road, like it currently does. It intersected US 78/SR 10/SR 12 (Milledgeville Road). This intersection was the eastern terminus of SR 12 at the time. US 1, US 78, SR 4, and SR 10 followed Milledgeville Road to the east-southeast. They intersected US 25/SR 21 (Savannah Road). This intersection was the northern terminus of SR 21 at the time. The five highways traveled northeast on Twiggs Street. They curved to the north-northeast onto 7th Street (listed as "Seventh Street" on the map). At SR 28 (Broad Street), US 25 turned left to the west-northwest, while US 1, US 78, SR 4, and SR 10 turned right to the east-southeast. At an intersection with 5th Street, the four highways split off of SR 28 to the north-northeast and traveled to the South Carolina state line. At the end of 1939, SR 57's eastern terminus was extended from Swainsboro to just north of Oak Park, forming a concurrency with US 1 and SR 4 between the two points.

=== 1940s and 1950s ===
In the first quarter of 1940, the northern end of the segment of SR 17 concurrent with US 1 and SR 4 north of Louisville was shifted north-northeast to Wrens. Between January 1945 and November 1946, SR 46 was placed on a concurrency with US 1/SR 4 in Oak Park. By March 1948, US 301 was placed on its concurrency with US 1/SR 4 between Florida and Homeland.

Between April 1949 and August 1950, US 23 was placed on its current concurrency with US 1/SR 4 and US 301. Between September 1953 and June 1954, US 221's northern terminus was extended from southwest of Louisville into South Carolina, including its concurrency with US 1/SR 4 and SR 17 from Louisville to Wrens. Between June 1954 and June 1955, US 1, US 78, and SR 4 were indicated to have split off from US 25 at the southern terminus of 7th Street to continue following Twiggs Street to the northeast. They turned right onto Calhoun Street (now part of Walton Way) and followed it to the east-southeast to 5th Street. From that intersection, they resumed their north-northeast direction. By July 1957, SR 4 was shifted off of US 1 and US 78 in Augusta. It was indicated to follow Deans Bridge Road, Milledgeville Road, and Twiggs Street like before, with US 1 and US 78, along with US 25, US 278, and SR 10 was shifted onto Gordon Highway. SR 4 was shown to follow 7th Street to Broad Street, but there was no indication as to whether if followed US 25 north/SR 28 west or US 25 south/SR 28 east. Between July 1957 and June 1960, SR 21 was extended along SR 4 from the meeting point of Milledgeville Road, Savannah Road, and Twiggs Street, and followed Twiggs Street and 7th Street to Broad Street, along with SR 4. US 25 was shifted off of Broad Street and followed US 1, US 78, US 278, and SR 10 along Gordon Highway to the state line. Its former path on Broad Street and 13th Street was redesignated as US 25 Bus.

=== 1960s ===
By June 1963, SR 15 was shifted to its current concurrency with US 1/US 23/SR 4 between Florida and Racepond and on US 1/SR 4 from Baxley to South Thompson. SR 121 was extended south-southeast along US 1/US 23/SR 4 (and SR 15) from Racepond to Folkston. By 1966, SR 88 was extended to the Sandersville area, thereby traveling on a concurrency with US 1/US 221/SR 4 and SR 17 in Wrens. The 1966 GDOT map was the first one with an inset map of Waycross. It indicated that US 1/US 23/SR 4 entered the city from the southeast on Memorial Drive. They began a concurrency with US 84/SR 50. At Plant Avenue, US 84 split off to the southwest. US 1, US 23, SR 4, SR 38, and SR 50 traveled to the northeast. At Albany Street, SR 50 split off to the west-northwest. At this intersection, US 82 joined the concurrency. At State Street, US 1, US 23, and SR 4 split off to the northwest. A northwestern bypass of Waycross, from US 82/SR 50 at the midway point between Waresboro and Waycross to US 1/US 23/SR 4 south-southeast of Dixie Union. In Augusta, SR 12 was extended along SR 4, along Milledgeville Road, where it ended at SR 21 (Savannah Road). From the 7th Street–Broad Street intersection, SR 21 was shown to have followed US 25 Bus./SR 28 to the west-northwest on Broad Street to 13th Street and then on 13th Street to the South Carolina state line. That year, SR 4 was removed from US 1 in the Wadley and Louisville areas. Its former path in each city was redesignated on US 1 and US 221 as SR 4 Bus. The next year, US 1 in both Wadley and Louisville was shifted eastward, onto SR 4. The former path on SR 4 Bus. was redesignated as US 1 Bus.

=== 1970s and 1980s ===
In 1978, a southern bypass of the main part of Waycross, designated as SR 714, was proposed from SR 122 west-southwest of the city to US 1/US 23/SR 4 southeast of it.

In 1980, SR 12's eastern terminus was truncated off SR 4 to end at its intersection with SR 4. The next year, SR 12's eastern terminus was further truncated to its current location, near Thomson, with the part of Milledgeville Road that is not part of SR 4 relinquished to local control. Also, the northern terminus of SR 21 was truncated to Millen. SR 4's path in Augusta was shifted to its current path. In 1982, a proposal to extend SR 714 was shown to have extended from just south of SR 122 north-northwest to US 82/SR 50 east-southeast of Waresboro (meeting the bypass road for the northwestern part of Waycross), and then west-northwest to another meeting point with US 82/SR 50 on the western edge of Waresboro. Between January 1984 and January 1986, the path of US 82 and SR 50 was shifted onto Reynolds Street, Jane Street, Francis Street, and the path of SR 714. US 84 was shifted onto Reynolds Street, as well. In 1988, the eastern terminus of SR 50 was truncated to Dawson. Its former path, on US 82 and US 84, was redesignated as SR 520.

=== 1990s to 2010s ===
In 1992, a northwestern bypass of Waycross, designated as SR 896, was proposed from US 82/SR 520 east-southeast of Waresboro to US 1/US 23/SR 4 north-northeast of Waresboro. In 1995, the path of US 1, US 23, and SR 4 through the Waycross, Georgia micropolitan area was shifted to the west, replacing the route of SR 896. The former path was redesignated as US 1 Bus., US 23 Bus., and SR 4 Bus. In 2002, a southwesterly bypass of Swainsboro was proposed from the intersection of US 1/SR 4 and SR 297 south-southeast of the city to US 1/SR 4 north-northwest of it. In 2004, the path of US 1 and SR 4 through the Swainsboro area was shifted to the west, onto the proposed bypass. Their former path was redesignated as US 1 Bus./SR 4 Bus. GDOT announced to the public that the portion of US 1/SR 4 between the southern part of Wrens and the interchange with I-520 was also designated as SR 540, as part of the Fall Line Freeway, on September 24, 2018.

== Future ==
The portion from the southern part of Wrens to the central part of Augusta is part of the Fall Line Freeway, a highway that connects Columbus and Augusta. This portion may eventually be incorporated into the proposed eastern extension of Interstate 14 (I-14), which is currently entirely within Central Texas and may be extended into Augusta.

=== Widening project (Wadley to Wrens) ===
The DOT will widen 21 miles (34 km) of US 1/SR 4 from north of Wadley to Wrens and will be a total of $17M in budget. This project will Widen US 1/SR 4 from two lanes to a four-lane road (each having 11 feet (3.4 m) in width). In a few years, it will be complete, and they'll move on to the next phase. This project will be completed on September 30, 2022.

== Major intersections ==
County	Location	mi	km	Destinations	Notes
St. Marys River		0.000	0.000	US 1 south / US 23 south / US 301 south (SR 15 south) – Hilliard, Jacksonville	Southern terminus; southern end of US 1, US 23, US 301, and SR 15 concurrencies; GA SR 15 continues as FL SR 15 at the state line; continuation into Florida
Charlton		2.666	4.291	Third Street north	Southern terminus of Third Street; former US 1 north
Charlton	Folkston	4.201	6.761	SR 40 east (Main Street) to I-95 – Kingsland, Okefenokee National Wildlife Refuge	Western terminus of SR 40
Charlton	Folkston	4.275	6.880	Love Street	Former SR 252 east
Charlton	Folkston	4.678	7.529	SR 23 south / SR 121 south – St. George	Southern end of SR 23 and SR 121 concurrencies
Charlton	Folkston	5.044	8.118	SR 40 Conn. east (Indian Trail) – Kingsland, White Oak, Charlton County High School, D. Ray James Prison	Western terminus of SR 40 Conn.; provides access to Charlton Family Care
Charlton	Homeland	6.772	10.898	US 301 north / SR 23 north – Jesup	Northern end of US 301 and SR 23 concurrencies; interchange
Charlton		12.367	19.903	Crews Road north / Old Dixie Highway south	Southern terminus of Crews Road; northern terminus of Old Dixie Highway; former US 1 south
Charlton	Racepond	18.755	30.183	SR 15 north / SR 121 north – Blackshear	Northern end of SR 15 and SR 121 concurrencies
Ware		30.924	49.767	SR 177 – Okefenokee Swamp Park, Laura S. Walker State Park and Golf Course	
Ware	Waycross	37.742	60.740	US 82 east / SR 520 east (South Georgia Parkway) / US 1 Bus. north / US 23 Bus. north / SR 4 Bus. north (Memorial Drive) – Alma, Brunswick	Southern end of US 82/SR 520 concurrency; southern terminus of US 1 Bus./US 23 Bus./SR 4 Bus.
Ware	Waycross	39.219	63.117	US 84 / SR 38	
Ware	Waycross	39.418	63.437	US 84 east / SR 38 east (McDonald Street) – Blackshear, Jesup, Savannah	Eastern end of US 84/SR 38 concurrency
Ware	Waycross	40.584	65.314	US 84 west / SR 38 west (Victory Drive) – Valdosta, Coastal Pines Technical College, Ware County High School	Western end of US 84/SR 38 concurrency
Ware		42.691	68.705	SR 122 west (Carswell Avenue) – Lakeland	Eastern terminus of SR 122
Ware		45.005	72.429	US 82 west / SR 520 west – Pearson	Northern end of US 82/SR 520 concurrency
Ware		49.069	78.969	US 1 Bus. south / US 23 Bus. south / SR 4 Bus. south (Alma Highway) – Waycross–Ware County Airport	Northern terminus of US 1 Bus./US 23 Bus./SR 4 Bus.
Bacon	Alma	66.727	107.387	SR 4 Alt. north (South Dixon Street)	Southern terminus of SR 4 Alt.
Bacon	Alma	67.164	108.090	SR 32 (16th Street) – Douglas, Patterson	
Bacon	Alma	68.275	109.878	SR 4 Alt. south (North Dixon Street) / Camellia Drive east	Northern terminus of SR 4 Alt.; western terminus of Camellia Drive
Bacon		73.499	118.285	US 23 north / SR 19 north – Hazlehurst	Northern end of US 23 concurrency; southern terminus of SR 19
Appling	Baxley	84.903	136.638	SR 15 south / Second Street west – Bristol	Southern end of SR 15 concurrency; eastern terminus of Second Street
Appling	Baxley	85.961	138.341	US 341 / SR 27 (Parker Street) – Hazlehurst, Jesup, Coastal Pines Technical College	
Appling	Baxley	86.182	138.696	North Main Street north – Glennville	Southern terminus of North Main Street; former SR 144 east
Altamaha River		97.314	156.612	Joseph Simmons Alexander Sr. Memorial Bridge	
Toombs	English Eddy	99.432	160.020	SR 147 east / Cedar Crossing Road west – Reidsville	Western terminus of SR 147; eastern terminus of Cedar Crossing Road
Toombs	Toombs Central	105.101	169.144	SR 56 – Uvalda, Reidsville, Gordonia-Alatamaha State Park & Golf Course	
Toombs	South Thompson	109.381	176.032	SR 15 north / SR 29 north – Vidalia	Northern end of SR 15 concurrency; southern terminus of SR 29
Toombs	Lyons	115.851	186.444	SR 178 east (South Victory Drive) – Georgia State Prison	Western terminus of SR 178
Toombs	Lyons	116.753	187.896	US 280 / SR 30 (Liberty Avenue) – Vidalia, Reidsville, Southeastern Tech	Provides access to Meadows Regional Medical Center
Toombs	Lyons	116.851	188.053	SR 152 east / SR 292 (Broad Street) – Vidalia, Cobbtown, Metter, Claxton	Western terminus of SR 152
Toombs	Lyons	119.848	192.877	SR 130 west / Resmando Road east – Vidalia	Eastern terminus of SR 130; western terminus of Resmando Road
Emanuel	Oak Park	129.308	208.101	SR 46 west / SR 86 – Ohoopee, Soperton	Southern end of SR 46 concurrency
Emanuel	Oak Park	131.319	211.337	Old Highway 46 east	Western terminus of Old Highway 46; former SR 46 east
Emanuel	Oak Park	131.743	212.020	I-16 (Jim L. Gillis Highway / SR 404) – Macon, Savannah	I-16 exit 90
Emanuel	Oak Park	131.951	212.355	SR 46 east – Metter	Northern end of SR 46 concurrency
Emanuel		134.416	216.322	SR 192 east / New Hope Church Road north – Stillmore	Western terminus of SR 192; southern terminus of New Hope Church Road
Emanuel		140.561	226.211	SR 57 east – Stillmore	Southern end of SR 57 concurrency
Emanuel		141.691	228.030	SR 297 south – Nunez	Northern terminus of SR 297
Emanuel		142.063	228.628	US 1 Bus. north / SR 4 Bus. north – Swainsboro, East Georgia State College	Southern terminus of US 1 Bus./SR 4 Bus.
Emanuel		145.556	234.250	SR 56 – Soperton, Swainsboro	
Emanuel	Swainsboro	146.382	235.579	US 80 / SR 26 – Dublin, Swainsboro	Provides access to Emanuel Medical Center
Emanuel		149.074	239.911	SR 57 west / Kight Road south – Wrightsville, Swainsboro, Swainsboro Tech	Northern end of SR 57 concurrency; northern terminus of Kight Road; provides access to Emanuel County Airport
Emanuel		150.813	242.710	US 1 Bus. south / SR 4 Bus. south – Swainsboro	Northern terminus of US 1 Bus./SR 4 Bus.
Jefferson		165.489	266.329	US 1 Bus. north / SR 4 Bus. north / Kennedy Road south – Wadley	Southern terminus of US 1 Bus./SR 4 Bus.; northern terminus of Kennedy Road
Jefferson	Wadley	167.172	269.037	US 319 south / SR 78 (East Calhoun Street) – Bartow, Midville	Northern terminus of US 319
Jefferson		168.921	271.852	US 1 Bus. south / SR 4 Bus. south – Wadley	Northern terminus of US 1 Bus./SR 4 Bus.
Jefferson	Louisville	175.533	282.493	US 1 Bus. north / SR 4 Bus. north – Louisville	Southern terminus of US 1 Bus./SR 4 Bus.
Jefferson	Louisville	176.191	283.552	SR 17 south – Midville	Southern end of SR 17 concurrency; provides access to Louisville Municipal Airport
Jefferson	Louisville	176.731	284.421	SR 24 (Mulberry Street) – Louisville, Waynesboro	
Jefferson	Louisville	177.619	285.850	US 1 Bus. south / US 221 south / SR 4 Bus. south (Peachtree Street) – Louisville, Bartow	Southern end of US 221 concurrency; northern terminus of US 1 Bus./SR 4 Bus.; provides access to intercity bus station and Jefferson Hospital
Jefferson		181.336	291.832	SR 296 north – Stapleton	Southern terminus of SR 296
Jefferson	Wrens	190.323	306.295	SR 540 west (Fall Line Freeway west) – Sandersville	Southern end of SR 540 concurrency
Jefferson	Wrens	191.502	308.193	SR 17 north (Thomson Highway) / Howard Street east – Thomson	Northern end of SR 17 concurrency; western terminus of Howard Street
Jefferson	Wrens	191.762	308.611	SR 80 / SR 88 east (Broad Street) to SR 17 / SR 102 – Warrenton, Waynesboro, Matthews, Keysville, Blythe, Avera, Thomson	Western terminus of SR 88
Jefferson	Wrens	192.751	310.203	US 221 north / SR 47 west – Harlem, Appling	Northern end of US 221 concurrency; eastern terminus of SR 47; provides access to Wrens Municipal Airport
Richmond	Blythe	205.355	330.487	SR 88 / Hoods Chapel Road north – Blythe, Hephzibah	Southern terminus of Hoods Chapel Road
Richmond	Augusta	213.171	343.065	Tobacco Road – Fort Gordon, Signal Corps Museum, Bush Field	Interchange
Richmond	Augusta	217.253	349.635	I-520 (Bobby Jones Expressway / SR 415) / SR 540 ends (Fall Line Freeway) – Columbia, Atlanta	Eastern terminus of SR 540; northern end of SR 540 concurrency; I-520 exit 5; Henry L. Howard Memorial Interchange
Richmond	Augusta	219.549	353.330	US 1 north / US 78 / US 278 / SR 10 (Gordon Highway) – Augusta, Fort Gordon, Thomson	Northern end of US 1 concurrency
Richmond	Augusta	224.059	360.588	US 25 Bus. south (Broad Street) – Augusta Central Business District	Southern end of US 25 Bus. concurrency
Richmond	Augusta	224.104	360.660	SR 104 east (Jones Street)	Eastern terminus of eastbound lanes of SR 104; one-way Jones Street
Richmond	Augusta	224.156	360.744	SR 104 west (Reynolds Street) to I-20 – Martinez	Eastern terminus of westbound lanes of SR 104; one-way Reynolds Street
Savannah River		224.344	361.047	US 25 Bus. north (Georgia Avenue) – North Augusta	Northern terminus; northern end of US 25 Bus. concurrency; continuation into South Carolina over the James U. Jackson Memorial Bridge
1.000 mi = 1.609 km; 1.000 km = 0.621 mi: Concurrency terminus

== Special routes ==
=== Waycross business loop ===
State Route 4 Business
- Location: Waycross, Georgia
- Length: 9.622 mi (15.485 km)
- Existed: 1996–present

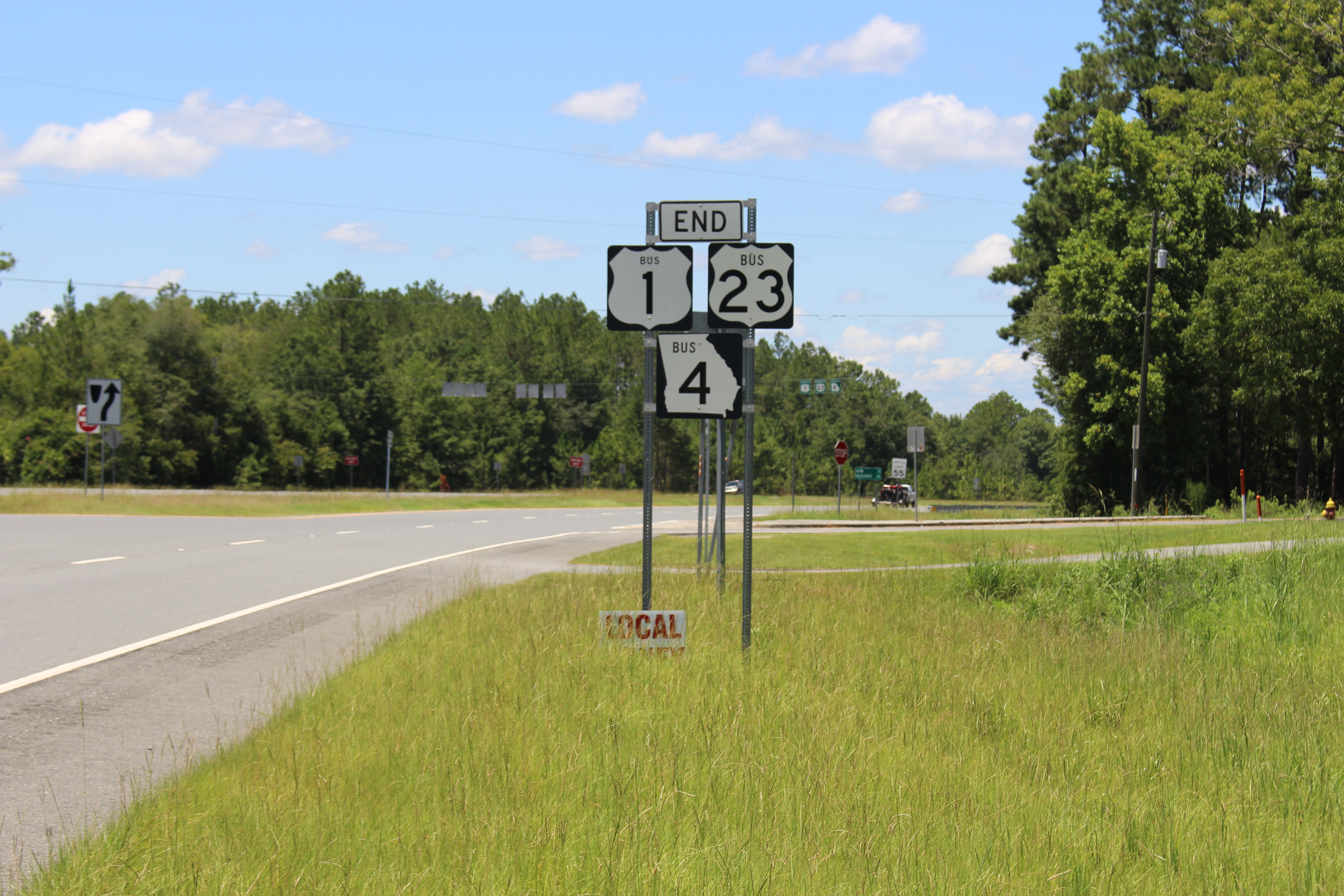
SR 4 Bus.'s northern terminus with US 1/US 23/SR 4

State Route 4 Business (SR 4 Bus.) is a 9.622-mile-long (15.485 km) business route of SR 4 partially in the city limits of Waycross. It is concurrent with US 1 Bus. and US 23 Bus. for its entire length. US 1 Bus./SR 4 Bus. was established in 1996, replacing the old mainline US 1/SR 4 through Waycross, via Memorial Drive, Plant Avenue, State Street, and Alma Highway. Except for the far northern end, the entire length of SR 4 Bus. is part of the National Highway System, a system of routes determined to be the most important for the nation's economy, mobility, and defense.

=== Alma spur route ===
State Route 4 Spur
- Location: Alma, Georgia
- Existed: 1946–1980

State Route 4 Spur (SR 4 Spur) was a spur route of SR 4 that existed in the Alma area. It was established between the beginning of 1945 and the end of 1946, from SR 32 just west of the city to US 1/US 23/SR 4 north of it. In 1953, a local road was established from US 1/US 23/SR 4 south of Alma to SR 4 Spur/SR 32 just west of the city. In 1976, SR 4 Spur was extended around the southwestern and southern edges of the city. In 1980, it was redesignated as SR 4 Alt.

=== Alma alternate route ===
State Route 4 Alternate
- Location: Alma, Georgia
- Length: 1.613 mi (2.596 km)
- Existed: 1980–2017

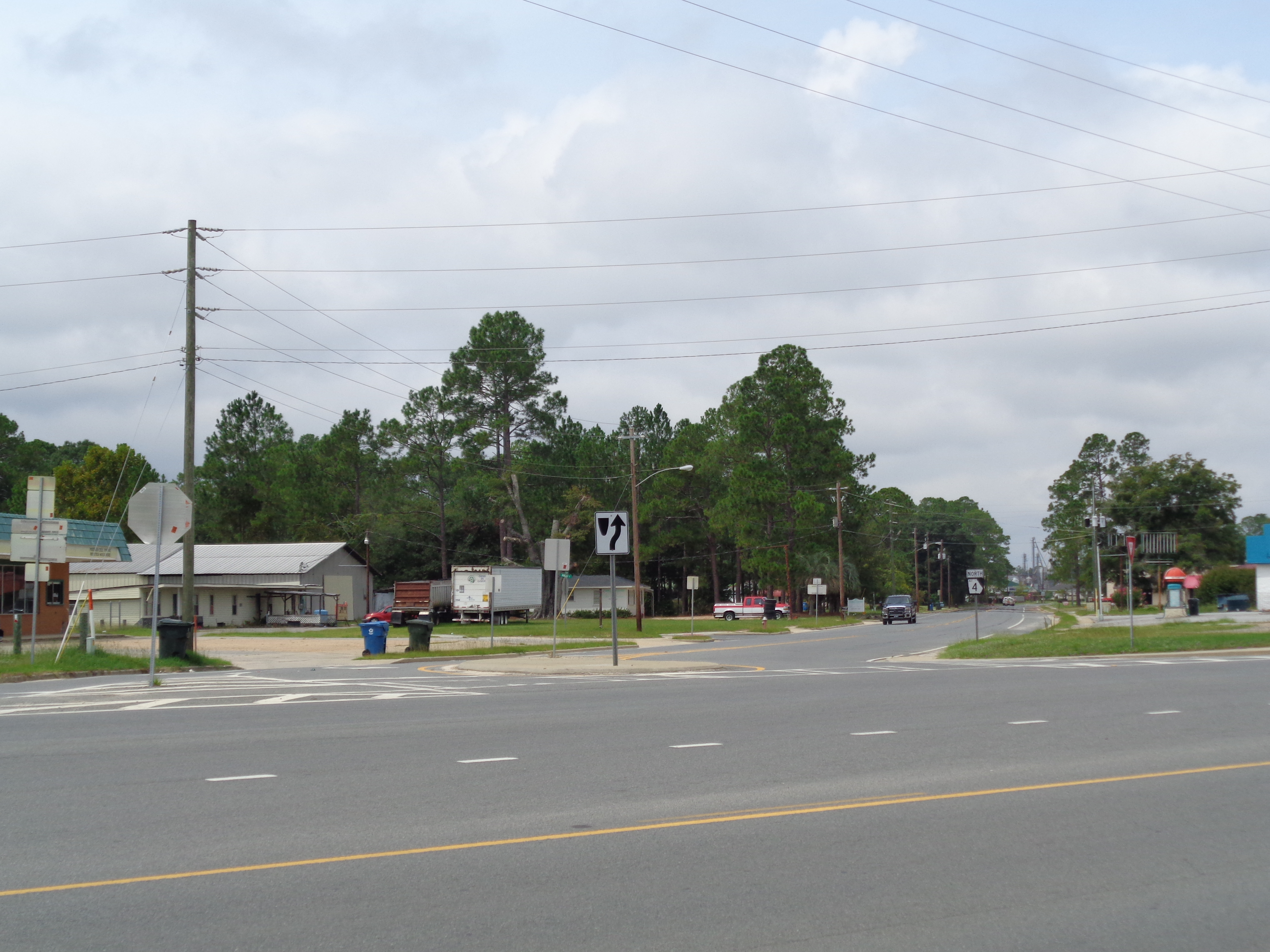
SR 4 Alt.'s southern terminus at US 1/US 23/SR 4

State Route 4 Alternate (SR 4 Alt.) was a 1.613-mile-long (2.596 km) alternate route of SR 4 in Alma that traveled south-to-north through the western part of the city.

It began at an intersection with the US 1/US 23/SR 4 mainline (Pierce Street) just south of the main part of Alma, although US 23 is not signed here. It traveled to the west-northwest on South Dixon Street and immediately curved to the northwest. Just past an intersection with the eastern terminus of Oak Street and the southern terminus of South Thomas Street, SR 4 Alt. began to gradually curve to the north-northwest. Just past an intersection with South Church Street, it passed an office of the Bacon County Department of Family and Children Services. It then intersected SR 32 (West 16th Street). At an intersection with the western terminus of West 15th Street, the alternate route curved to the north-northeast. At an intersection with 12th Street, it passed the Bacon County Courthouse and its local name changed to North Dixon Street.

Just south of Wall Street, it curved to the north-northwest for nearly one block. At an intersection with West 11th Street, it curved back to the north-northeast. An intersection with 6th Street led to the Alma, Bacon Co., GA Historical Society. Just north of an intersection with the northern terminus of Mercer Street, it began a curve to a nearly due north direction. The highway crossed over Bear Branch. It then curved to the east-northeast and intersected US 1/US 23/SR 4 (North Pierce Street). Here, SR 4 Alt. ended, and the roadway continues as Camellia Drive.

In the mid-1940s, SR 4 Spur was established on this same highway, but only on the part north of SR 32. In 1976, SR 4 Spur was extended to its southern terminus. In 1980, it was redesignated as SR 4 Alt.

SR 4 Alt. was removed from the Georgia state route system on August 17, 2017, per Order of the Commissioner 3639.

=== Swainsboro business loop ===
State Route 4 Business
- Location: Swainsboro, Georgia
- Length: 7.876 mi (12.675 km)
- Existed: 2004–present

State Route 4 Business (SR 4 Bus.) is a 7.876-mile-long (12.675 km) business route of SR 4 that is partially within the city limits of Swainsboro. It is concurrent with U.S. Route 1 Business (US 1 Bus.) for its entire length. The entire length of SR 4 Bus. is part of the National Highway System, a system of routes determined to be the most important for the nation's economy, mobility, and defense.

In 2003, a western bypass of Swainsboro was proposed. The next year, US 1/SR 4 were shifted onto this bypass. Their former path through the city was redesignated as US 1 Bus./SR 4 Bus.

=== Wadley business loop ===
State Route 4 Business
- Location: Wadley, Georgia
- Length: 3.645 mi (5.866 km)
- Existed: 1966 (SR 4 Bus.); 1967 (US 1 Bus.)–present

State Route 4 Business (SR 4 Bus.) is a 3.645-mile-long (5.866 km) business route of SR 4 that is mostly within the city limits of Wadley. It is concurrent with U.S. Route 1 Business (US 1 Bus.) for its entire length. It travels north through the heart of downtown, while the main route of US 1/SR 4 heads through the eastern part of the city. In 1966, SR 4 Bus. was established from US 1/SR 4 south-southeast of Wadley to US 1/SR 4 north of it. The next year, US 1 Bus. was established on the route of SR 4 Bus.

=== Louisville business loop ===
State Route 4 Business
- Location: Louisville, Georgia
- Length: 2.900 mi (4.667 km)
- Existed: 1966 (SR 4 Bus.); 1967 (US 1 Bus.)–present

State Route 4 Business (SR 4 Bus.) is a 2.900-mile-long (4.667 km) business route of SR 4 completely within the city limits of Louisville. It is concurrent with U.S. Route 1 Business (US 1 Bus.) for its entire length. In 1966, SR 4 through the city was shifted off of US 1. Its former path became SR 4 Bus. The next year, US 1 was shifted off of SR 4 Bus. and onto SR 4. Its former path was redesignated as US 1 Bus.
