= Georgia State Route 23 =

State highway in Georgia

State Route 23
- SR 23 highlighted in red

Route information
- Maintained by GDOT
- Length: 239.11 mi (384.81 km)
- Existed: 1919–present
- Tourist routes: Millen–Jenkins County Scenic Byway

Major junctions
- South end: SR 121 / SR 121 at the Florida state line southwest of Saint George
- US 1 / US 23 / US 301 / SR 4 / SR 15 in Folkston; US 1 / US 23 / SR 4 / SR 15 / SR 121 in Homeland; US 82 / SR 520 in Nahunta; US 25 / US 84 / US 341 / SR 27 / SR 38 in Jesup; US 84 / SR 38 / SR 57 in Ludowici; US 25 / US 301 / SR 73 / SR 144 in Glennville; I-16 in Metter; US 80 / SR 26 / SR 192 in Twin City; US 25 / SR 67 / SR 121 southwest of Millen; US 25 / SR 17 Byp. / SR 121 in Millen
- North end: SR 56 south of Augusta

Location
- Country: United States
- State: Georgia
- Counties: Charlton, Brantley, Wayne, Long, Tattnall, Candler, Emanuel, Jenkins, Burke

Highway system
- Georgia State Highway System; Interstate; US; State; Special
← US 23	→ I-24

State Route 23 (SR 23) is a 239.11-mile-long (384.81 km) state highway that travels south-to-north through portions of Charlton, Brantley, Wayne, Long, Tattnall, Candler, Emanuel, Jenkins, and Burke counties in the southeastern and east-central parts of the U.S. state of Georgia. The highway connects the Florida state line, south-southwest of Saint George with the southern part of the Augusta metropolitan area, via Folkston, Nahunta, Jesup, Ludowici, Glennville, Reidsville, Metter, Twin City, and Millen.

SR 23's original segment was from Statesboro to Millen. It was shifted westward and was incrementally extended in both directions to each of its current termini.

== Route description ==
=== Florida to Reidsville ===
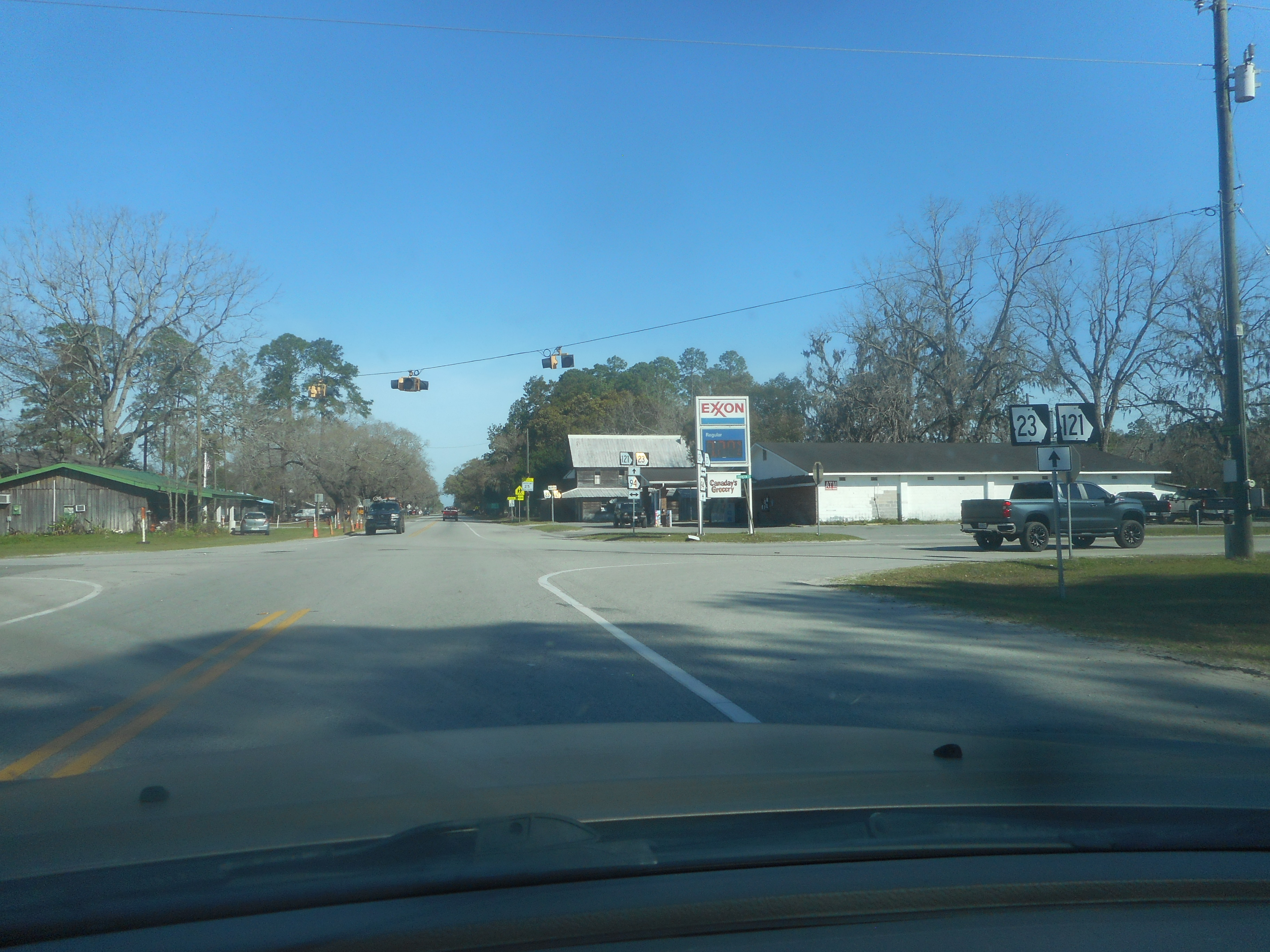
Georgia State Route 23 and 121 just before the intersection with GA 94 in Saint George, Georgia.

SR 23 begins at the Florida state line west-northwest of the southernmost point in the state, in Charlton County. South-southeast of here, the roadway continues as State Road 121, which travels to Macclenny, Florida. North of here, SR 23 travels concurrent with SR 121 on Okefenokee Parkway. Almost immediately, they meet the southern end of SR 185. A short distance later, the two highways curve to the northeast. Then, they curve to the north-northwest and enter Saint George. In town, they have an intersection with SR 94 (Moniac Road). The concurrent highways continue to the north, through rural areas of the county and then curve to the northeast. After that, they enter Folkston, to an intersection with US 1/US 23/US 301/SR 4/SR 15 (2nd Street North). The seven highways travel to the north concurrently. Along the Folkston–Homeland city line, which travels through the large intersection, US 301/SR 23 continue straight ahead, while US 1/US 23/SR 4/SR 15 travel to the northwest. Then, US 301/SR 23 gradually curve to the north and enter Brantley County. The concurrency enters Nahunta, where it intersects US 82/SR 520 (Cleveland Street). Then, they intersect SR 32 in Hortense, just before entering Wayne County. Just before entering Jesup, they pass by Jesup–Wayne County Airport and Pine Forest Country Club. In town, they intersect US 25/US 341/SR 27 (East Cherry Street). At this intersection, US 25 joins the concurrency. The three highways curve to the northwest and intersect US 84/SR 38 (North 1st Street), which join the concurrency. Immediately, the five highways travel north and then leave town. Just under 3 miles (4.8 km) later, they curve to the northeast. Then, they pass by an industrial waste pond of Rayonier just before crossing over the Altamaha River into Long County. In Ludowici, they intersect SR 57 (Mc Donald Street). At this intersection, US 84/SR 38 split off to the northeast on Cypress Street, while US 25/US 301/SR 23/SR 57 travel to the northwest. The concurrent highways begin a curve to the north and cross over Beards Creek into Tattnall County. After they meet the western end of SR 196, they curve to the northeast and enter Glennville. At Barnard Street, they intersect SR 144, and SR 23/SR 57 split off to the northwest. A little over 2,000 feet (610 m) later, SR 144 splits off to the west on Hencart Road, while SR 23/SR 57 pass by Kicks Playland and leave town. To the northwest, they intersect SR 169. A little farther along, SR 121 rejoins the concurrency. The three highways enter Reidsville.

=== Reidsville to northern end ===
In Reidsville, SR 23/SR 57/SR 121 intersect US 280/SR 30 (Brazell Street). Before leaving town, they curve north. After that, they curve to the northeast and enter Collins, where they intersect SR 292 (Manassas Street). SR 23/SR 57/SR 121 curve to the north and enter Cobbtown. In town, they meet the eastern end of SR 152 (New Cobbtown Road). Approximately 400 feet (120 m) later, SR 57 continues straight ahead, while SR 23/SR 121 curve to the northeast and leave town just before entering Candler County. In Metter, they have an interchange with Interstate 16 (I-16; Jim Gillis Historic Savannah Parkway). In the main part of town, they intersect SR 46 (Broad Street). At this intersection, SR 23 splits off to the west, concurrent with SR 46 for a few blocks, while SR 121 continues straight ahead. At College Street, SR 23 splits off to the north and gradually curves to the northwest. It passes Candler County Hospital. Just after leaving town, it passes Willow Lake Golf Club and Byrd Cemetery. Farther to the northwest, the highway enters Emanuel County and crosses into the city limits of Twin City. In town, is an intersection with SR 192. At this intersection, SR 23 turns to the right and travels to the northeast. Then, it intersects US 80/SR 26. Just before leaving town, the route passes by Twin City Cemetery. After traveling through Garfield, it enters Jenkins County. The highway passes through rural areas of the county, curves to the east, and intersects US 25/SR 67/SR 121. The four highways head concurrently to the north. Then, they curve to the northeast and cross over the Ogeechee River just before entering Millen. In town, they intersect SR 17 Byp. (South Gray Street), which joins the concurrency. The five highways curve north and intersect SR 17 (West Winthrope Avenue). At this intersection, SR 17 Byp. meets its northern end and US 25/SR 121 continue straight ahead, while SR 23/SR 67 turn right and follow SR 17 south. At Masonic Street, SR 17 and SR 23 split off to different directions, while SR 67 continues to the east. At Jordan Avenue, SR 23 curves to the northeast. Just after leaving town, it intersects SR 21 (Millen Bypass). Farther to the north, it crosses over Beaverdam Creek into Burke County. In Sardis, it intersects SR 24 (Charles Perry Avenue). In Girard, the highway begins a northwesterly routing. The highway enters Shell Bluff, where it intersects SR 80. Then, it passes Hagler Lake before meeting its northern end, an intersection with SR 56, just south of Augusta.

=== National Highway System ===
The following portions of SR 23 part of the National Highway System, a system of routes determined to be the most important for the nation's economy, mobility, and defense:

- The Folkston–Homeland segment (concurrent with US 1/US 23/US 301/SR 4/SR 15)
- The Jesup–Ludowici segment (mostly concurrent with US 84/US 301/SR 38)
- The section concurrent with US 25/SR 67/SR 121 southwest of Millen and into the city

== History ==
=== 1920s ===
SR 23 was established at least as early as 1919 on a different alignment than it travels today. It extended from SR 26 in Statesboro to SR 21 in Millen. At this time, SR 38 was established on SR 23's current path from Jesup to Ludowici. Also, an unnumbered road was established from SR 30 in Reidsville to SR 26 in Metter. By the end of September 1921, the original path of SR 23 from Statesboro to Millen was shifted westward, to travel from SR 26 in Metter to SR 21 in Millen; this placed SR 23 on a concurrency with SR 26 from Metter to Graymont, the old name of Twin City. SR 23's former path was redesignated as portions of SR 46 and SR 67. SR 23 was extended southward to SR 30 in Reidsville, with a very brief concurrency with SR 30 there, then southeast to SR 25 in Darien. By October 1926, SR 38's crossing over the Altamaha River, between Jesup and Ludowici, was indicated to have "no bridge or ferry". Also, US 17 was designated on SR 25 in Darien.

=== 1930s ===
In the second half of 1930, US 25 designated on SR 23 south-southwest of Millen. By the beginning of 1932, SR 38's crossing over Altamaha River was indicated to have a bridge. US 280 was designated on the portion of SR 23 in Reidsville. In April 1932, the path of SR 23 from Darien to Ludowici was shifted southwestward. SR 23 then extended southwest on SR 38 from Ludowici to Jesup, then on a sole path south-southwest to US 1/SR 4 in Folkston. The former path of SR 23 was redesignated as SR 99. In the first quarter of 1937, the southern terminus of SR 23 was extended west-southwest from Folkston and south to Saint George. At the end of the year, it was extended again: south-southwest to the Florida state line. The next year, SR 23 was truncated to SR 94 in Saint George. By the middle of 1939, US 25 designated on the Jesup–Glennville segment. Also, the northern terminus of SR 23 was extended northeast to SR 24 in Sardis. At least as early as 1939, an unnumbered road was established northeast from Sardis to Girard, then northwest to SR 56 north-northeast of Waynesboro.

=== 1940s to 1980s ===
At the end of 1940, SR 23's southern terminus was re-extended south-southwest to the Florida state line. Between November 1946 and February 1948, US 301 was designated on the Folkston–Glennville segment. Between July 1957 and June 1960, SR 23 was extended on this road. At this time, the entire length of the highway was paved. By June 1963, SR 121 was extended on the path of SR 23 from Homeland to the Florida state line. SR 121 was also designated on SR 23 from southeast of Reidsville to Metter. In 1985, SR 57 was designated on SR 23 from Ludowici to Cobbtown.

== Major intersections ==
County	Location	mi	km	Destinations	Notes
St. Marys River		0.000	0.000	SR 121 south / SR 121 begins – Macclenny	Southern terminus; southern end of SR 121 concurrency; continuation into Florida as FL SR 121
Charlton		0.414	0.666	SR 185 north – Moniac	Southern terminus of SR 185
Charlton	Saint George	13.165	21.187	SR 94 (Moniac Road) – Moniac, Fargo, Crawford	
Charlton	Folkston	36.525	58.781	US 1 south / US 23 south / US 301 south / SR 4 south / SR 15 south – Hilliard, Jacksonville	Southern end of US 1/US 23/SR 4/SR 15 and US 301 concurrencies
Charlton	Folkston	36.890	59.369	SR 40 Conn. east (Cross Street) – Kingsland, White Oak, D. Ray James Prison	Western terminus of SR 40 Conn.
Charlton	Folkston–Homeland line	38.619	62.151	US 1 north / US 23 north / SR 4 north / SR 15 north / SR 121 north – Waycross	Northern end of US 1/US 23/SR 4/SR 15 and SR 121 concurrencies; interchange
Brantley	Nahunta	61.980	99.747	US 82 / SR 520 (South Georgia Parkway) to I-95 (SR 405) – Waycross, Brunswick, Laura S. Walker State Park	
Brantley	Hortense	71.349	114.825	SR 32 – Patterson, Brunswick	
Wayne	Jesup	89.962	144.780	US 25 south / US 341 / SR 27 (Cherry Street) to I-95 (SR 405) – Downtown Jesup, Brunswick, Altamaha Tech	Southern end of US 25 concurrency
Wayne	Jesup	92.431	148.753	US 84 west / SR 38 west – Business District	Southern end of US 84/SR 38 concurrency; no northbound exit; interchange
Altamaha River		95.796	154.169	Dr. J. Alvin Leaphart Sr. Memorial Bridge	
Long	Ludowici	102.128	164.359	US 84 east / SR 38 east / SR 57 south (McDonald Street) to I-95 (SR 405) – Hinesville, Darien, Ludowici Well Pavilion Historic Site	Northern end of US 84/SR 38 concurrency; southern end of SR 57 concurrency
Tattnall		121.299	195.212	SR 196 east – Hinesville	Western terminus of SR 196
Tattnall	Glennville	123.119	198.141	US 25 north / US 301 north / SR 73 north (Veterans Boulevard) / SR 144 east (Barnard Street) – Claxton, Fort Stewart	Northern end of US 25 and US 301 concurrencies; southern end of SR 144 concurrency; southern terminus of SR 73
Tattnall	Glennville	123.697	199.071	SR 144 west (Hencart Road) – Baxley	Northern end of SR 144 concurrency
Tattnall		127.115	204.572	SR 169 (Mendes Highway) – Jesup, Bellville	
Tattnall		134.887	217.080	SR 121 south – Jesup, Blackshear	Southern end of SR 121 concurrency
Tattnall	Reidsville	138.353	222.658	US 280 / SR 30 (Brazell Street) – Lyons, Claxton	
Tattnall	Collins	145.043	233.424	SR 292 (Manassas Street) – Lyons, Claxton	
Tattnall	Cobbtown	152.210	244.958	SR 152 west (New Cobbtown Road) – Lyons	Eastern terminus of SR 152
Tattnall	Cobbtown	152.325	245.143	SR 57 north – Stillmore, Swainsboro	Northern end of SR 57 concurrency
Candler	Metter	160.094	257.646	I-16 (Jim L. Gillis Historic Savannah Parkway / SR 404) – Macon, Savannah	I-16/SR 404 exit 104
Candler	Metter	161.792	260.379	SR 46 east (Broad Street) / SR 121 north (Lewis Street) – Statesboro, Millen	Northern end of SR 121 concurrency; southern end of SR 46 concurrency
Candler	Metter	162.040	260.778	SR 46 west (Broad Street) – Soperton	Northern end of SR 46 concurrency
Emanuel	Twin City	176.208	283.579	SR 23 Spur north (Fifth Avenue) – Summertown, Swainsboro	Southern terminus of SR 23 Spur
Emanuel	Twin City	176.705	284.379	US 80 / SR 26 – Swainsboro, Statesboro	
Jenkins		193.455	311.336	US 25 south / SR 67 south / SR 121 south – Metter, Statesboro	Southern end of US 25/SR 121 and SR 67 concurrencies
Jenkins	Millen	196.294	315.905	SR 17 Byp. east (South Gray Street) – Scarboro	Southern end of SR 17 Byp. concurrency
Jenkins	Millen	196.926	316.922	US 25 north / SR 121 north (Statesboro Road) / SR 17 west (West Winthrope Avenue) – Waynesboro, Midville, Magnolia Springs State Park	Northern end of US 25/SR 121 and SR 17 Byp. concurrencies; southern end of SR 17 concurrency
Jenkins	Millen	197.613	318.027	SR 17 east (Masonic Street) – Rocky Ford, Savannah	Northern end of SR 17 concurrency
Jenkins	Millen	197.626	318.048	SR 67 north (East Winthrope Avenue) – Sylvania	Northern end of SR 67 concurrency
Jenkins		199.133	320.473	SR 21 – Waynesboro, Sylvania	
Burke	Sardis	214.066	344.506	SR 24 (Charles Perry Avenue) – Waynesboro, Sylvania	
Burke	Sardis	214.113	344.581	SR 24 Conn. south	Northern terminus of SR 24 Conn.
Burke	Shell Bluff	233.429	375.668	SR 80 – Waynesboro	
Burke		239.110	384.810	SR 56 – Waynesboro, Augusta	Northern terminus
1.000 mi = 1.609 km; 1.000 km = 0.621 mi: Concurrency terminus

== Special routes ==
=== Glennville connector route ===
State Route 23 Connector
- Location: Glennville
- Existed: 1949–1985

State Route 23 Connector (SR 23 Conn.) was a connector route of SR 23 that existed entirely within the city limits of Glennville. Between February 1948 and April 1949, it was established from SR 23 in the northwestern part of the city to US 25/US 301/SR 73 in the northern part of the city. In 1985, this connector was decommissioned.

The entire route was in Glennville, Tattnall County.

mi	km	Destinations	Notes
		SR 23	Western terminus
		US 25 / US 301 / SR 73	Eastern terminus
1.000 mi = 1.609 km; 1.000 km = 0.621 mi

=== Twin City spur route ===
State Route 23 Spur
- Location: Twin City
- Length: 0.089 mi (143 m)
- Existed: 1952–present

State Route 23 Spur (SR 23 Spur) is a 472-foot-long (144 m) spur route of SR 23 that exists entirely within the southeastern part of Emanuel County and travels completely within the city limits of Twin City. The highway is known as 5th Avenue for its entire length.

It begins at an intersection with the SR 23 mainline in the southwestern part of town. It travels one block to meet its northern terminus, an intersection with SR 192.

SR 23 Spur is not part of the National Highway System, a system of roadways important to the nation's economy, defense, and mobility.

Between the beginning of 1940 and the beginning of 1953, SR 23 Spur was established from SR 23 at what is its current southern terminus to US 80/SR 26. By the beginning of 1975, it was truncated to its current length. Its former path was redesignated as a western rerouting of SR 192. The former path of SR 192 was redesignated as SR 192 Spur.

The entire route is in Twin City, Emanuel County.

mi	km	Destinations	Notes
0.000	0.000	SR 23 (5th Avenue south / Elm Street east) – Metter, Millen	Southern terminus; SR 23 takes on the 5th Avenue name.
0.089	0.143	SR 192 (South Railroad Avenue south / 5th Avenue north) – Stillmore, Summertown, Swainsboro	Northern terminus; SR 192 takes on the 5th Avenue name.
1.000 mi = 1.609 km; 1.000 km = 0.621 mi

== See also ==
- Central Savannah River Area
