= Georgia State Route 192 =

State highway in Georgia, United States

State Route 192
- Olive Collins Road
- Georgia State Route 192 highlighted in red

Route information
- Maintained by GDOT
- Length: 30.3 mi (48.8 km)

Major junctions
- South end: US 1 / SR 4 north of Oak Park
- US 80 / SR 26 in Twin City
- North end: SR 56 in Summertown

Location
- Country: United States
- State: Georgia
- Counties: Emanuel

Highway system
- Georgia State Highway System; Interstate; US; State; Special
← SR 191	→ SR 193

State Route 192 (SR 192) is a 30.3-mile-long (48.8 km) state highway that runs south-to-north in an eastern arc around Swainsboro through portions of Emanuel County in the east-central part of the U.S. state of Georgia.

== Route description ==
SR 192 begins at an intersection with US 1/SR 4 just north of Oak Park. It heads east into Stillmore, where it intersects SR 57 (2nd Street). The route continues east for about two blocks. Then, it turns north and curves to the northeast until it enters Twin City. There, it meets SR 23, and then US 80/SR 26. SR 192 continues to the north and curves to the northwest until it meets its southern terminus at SR 56 (Covena Road) in Summertown.

== Major intersections ==
The entire route is in Emanuel County.

Location	mi	km	Destinations	Notes
	0.0	0.0	US 1 / SR 4 – Lyons, Swainsboro	Southern terminus
Stillmore	5.1	8.2	SR 57 (2nd Street) – Cobbtown, Swainsboro	
Twin City	15.6	25.1	SR 23 (5th Avenue/North Railroad Avenue) – Metter, Garfield	
Twin City	16.2	26.1	US 80 / SR 26 – Swainsboro, Statesboro	
Summertown	30.3	48.8	SR 56 (Covena Road) – Swainsboro, Midville	Northern terminus
1.000 mi = 1.609 km; 1.000 km = 0.621 mi

== Special routes ==
=== Twin City spur route ===
State Route 192 Spur
- Location: Twin City
- Existed: 1974–2010

State Route 192 Spur (SR 192 Spur) was a spur route of SR 192 that existed partially in the city limits of Twin City. At least as early as 1940, this roadway was established as part of the SR 192 mainline. Between the beginning of 1953 and the beginning of 1975, SR 192 was shifted off this road, and onto a more western routing through the city. All of its former path that was not concurrent with SR 23 was redesignated as SR 192 Spur. Between the beginning of 1995 and the beginning of 2011, this spur route was decommissioned.

The entire route was in Emanuel County.

Location	mi	km	Destinations	Notes
Twin City			SR 23	Southern terminus
			SR 192	Northern terminus
1.000 mi = 1.609 km; 1.000 km = 0.621 mi
