= Dante Brown =

American football player (born 1980)

No. 46
- Position: Running back

Personal information
- Born: July 28, 1980 (age 46); Cincinnati, Ohio, U.S.
- Listed height: 6 ft 1 in (1.85 m)
- Listed weight: 218 lb (99 kg)

Career information
- High school: Swainsboro (Swainsboro, Georgia)
- College: Memphis
- NFL draft: 2003: undrafted

Career history
- Pittsburgh Steelers (2003–2004); Cleveland Browns (2004)*; Buffalo Bills (2004); Seattle Seahawks (2005)*
- * Offseason or practice squad member only
- Stats at Pro Football Reference

Dante Brown (born July 28, 1980) is an American former professional football running back who played one season with the Pittsburgh Steelers of the National Football League (NFL). He played college football at Middle Georgia College and the University of Memphis. Brown was also a member of the Cleveland Browns, Buffalo Bills and Seattle Seahawks.

== Early life and college ==
Dante Brown was born on July 28, 1980, in Cincinnati, Ohio. He attended Swainsboro High School in Swainsboro, Georgia.

Brown first played college football at Middle Georgia College from 1999 to 2000. He was a two-year letterman for the Memphis Tigers of the University of Memphis from 2001 to 2002.

== Professional career ==
Brown was rated as the 31st best running back in the 2003 NFL draft by NFLDraftScout.com.

On April 29, 2003, Brown signed with the Pittsburgh Steelers after going undrafted in the 2003 NFL draft. He made his NFL debut on November 14, 2004 against the Cleveland Browns, with a notable record of two rushing yards in one attempt. He was released by the Steelers on November 24, 2004.

Brown was signed to the Cleveland Browns practice squad on November 30, 2004.

After his time with the Browns practice squad, he was signed to the Buffalo Bills active roster on December 23, 2004. He was released by the Bills on May 17, 2005.

Brown signed with the Seattle Seahawks on August 10, 2005. He was released by the Seahawks on August 29, 2005.
