= Emanuel County School District =

American school district

Address
- 201 North Main Street Swainsboro, Georgia, 30401-3500; United States
- Coordinates: 32.598163°N 82.335136°W

District information
- Grades: Pre-school - 12
- Superintendent: Dr. Kevin Judy
- Accreditation(s): Southern Association of Colleges and Schools; Georgia Accrediting Commission

Students and staff
- Enrollment: 4,382
- Faculty: 293

Other information
- Telephone: (478) 237-6674
- Fax: (478) 419-1102
- Website: www.emanuel.k12.ga.us

The Emanuel County School District is a public school district in Emanuel County, Georgia, United States, based in Swainsboro. It serves the communities of Adrian, Garfield, Nunez, Oak Park, Stillmore, Summertown, Swainsboro, and Twin City.

== Schools ==
The Emanuel County School District has four elementary schools, two middle schools, and two high schools.

=== Elementary schools ===
- Twin City Elementary School
- Swainsboro Elementary School
- Swainsboro Primary School

=== Middle schools ===
- Emanuel County Institute
- Swainsboro Middle School

=== High school ===
- Emanuel County Institute ((ECI)
- Swainsboro High School

ECI was preceded by Graymont Academy. Bulldogs are the school mascot
