= Savannah and Statesboro Railway =

American rail company (founded 1897)

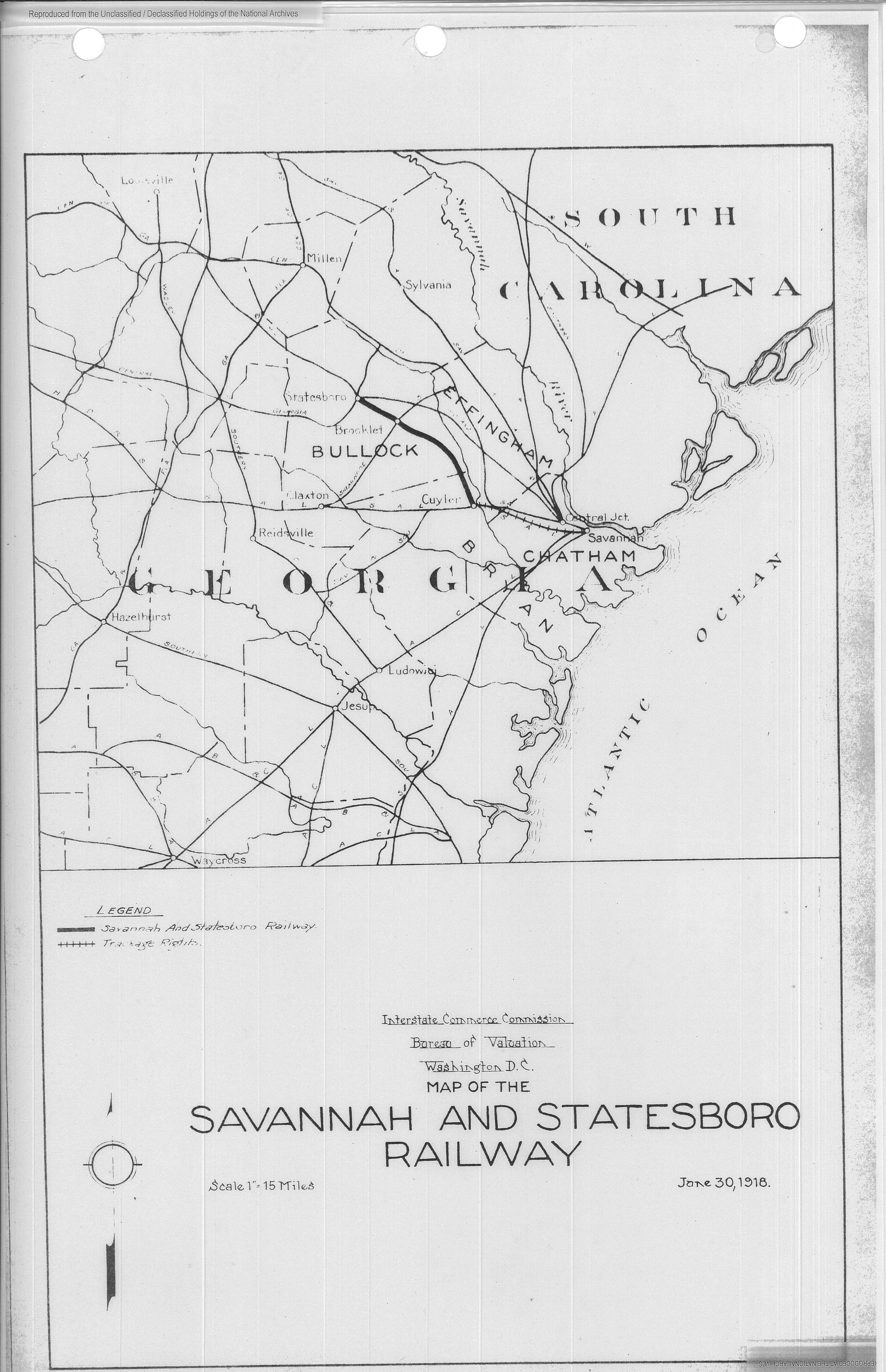
Map of the Savannah and Statesboro

The Savannah and Statesboro Railway (S&S) began in 1897 through a reorganization of the Cuyler and Woodburn Railroad (C&W). By 1899, it operated about 33 miles (53 km) of track between Cuyler and Statesboro, Georgia, United States. The S&S also controlled the Savannah, Augusta and Northern Railway from 1911 until 1916 when the SA&N was taken over by the Midland Railway.

The S&S lasted until 1933 when it was abandoned; a stub at Statesboro became the Statesboro Terminal Company, leased by the Georgia and Florida Railroad (through the Statesboro Northern Railway) until its abandonment in 1950.
