= Savannah, Augusta and Northern Railway =

Historical Georgia railroad

The Savannah, Augusta and Northern Railway began operations around 1908, running from Statesboro, Georgia to Garfield, Georgia. It was in the process of building from Garfield to Stevens Crossing, Georgia when in went into receivership and was sold to new owners around 1910. Apparently, the line retained the name under the new ownership however the line was being operated by the Savannah and Statesboro Railway from 1911 to 1915.

In 1909, a case involving the company was decided in the Supreme Court of Georgia (Savannah, Augusta & Northern Railway Co v. Williams).

On September 1, 1915, the railroad was merged into the Midland Railway.
