= Demello Jones =

American football player

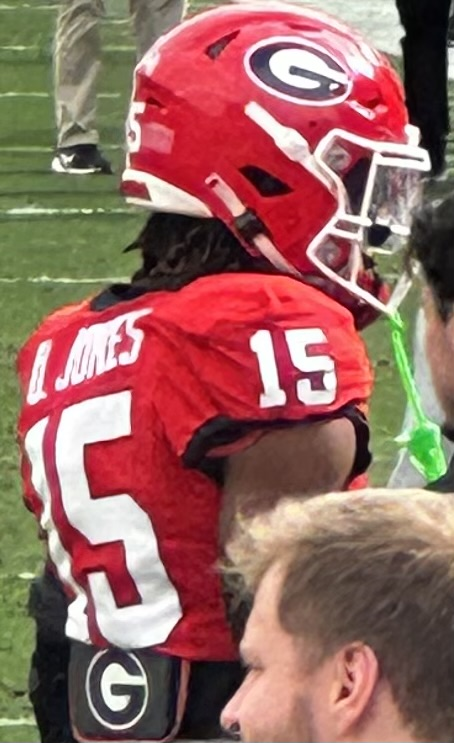
- Jones in 2025

No. 8 – Georgia Bulldogs
- Position: Cornerback
- Class: Junior

Personal information
- Listed height: 6 ft 1 in (1.85 m)
- Listed weight: 185 lb (84 kg)

Career information
- High school: Swainsboro (Swainsboro, Georgia)
- College: Georgia (2024–present)
- Stats at ESPN

Demello Jones is an American college football cornerback for the Georgia Bulldogs of the Southeastern Conference (SEC).

== Early life ==
Jones attended Swainsboro High School in Swainsboro, Georgia. In addition to football, he also played basketball and won a state championship in track and field. As a junior, playing running back and safety, he rushed for 1,279 yards and 20 yards and made 44 tackles. A four-star recruit, he committed to play college football at the University of Georgia.

== College career ==
Jones played sparingly in 2024, recording a tackle in six games. The following season, his playing time increased, earning a starting role in the Bulldogs' defense.
