= Sardis Creek =

Stream in Georgia, U.S.

Coordinates: 32°39′9.59″N 82°28′22.47″W

Sardis Creek is a stream in the U.S. state of Georgia. It is a tributary to the Ohoopee River.

Sardis Creek derives its name from James Sartain, an early landowner. Many variant names have been recorded, including: "Sardins Creek", "Sartains Creek", "Sartian Creek", "Sartins Creek", "Sartium Creek", and "Sertains Creek".
