= Blundale, Georgia =

Unincorporated community in Georgia, U.S.

Coordinates: 32°44′54″N 82°23′28″W

Blundale is an unincorporated community in Emanuel County, in the U.S. state of Georgia.

== History ==
A post office called Blundale was established in 1901, and remained in operation until 1951. The community had a depot on the Stillmore Air Line Railroad.
