= Rufus Hannah =

American activist (1954–2017)

- Born: November 27, 1954
- Died: October 4, 2017 (aged 62); Swainsboro, Georgia, U.S.
- Occupations: Construction worker and manager, homeless rights advocate
- Known for: Advocate for Homeless Rights; Appearances in Bumfights
- Children: 4
- Military career
- Allegiance: United States
- Branch: United States Army
- Service years: 1981
- Rank: Private

Rufus Hannah (November 27, 1954 – October 4, 2017), also known as Roofus the Stunt Bum, was an American advocate for homeless rights who became known for his role in the early Bumfights videos: in 2000, while himself a homeless alcoholic, he was paid $5 to be filmed running headfirst into an intermodal container.

== Biography ==
Hannah was raised in Swainsboro, Georgia. He started drinking at 14, despite having a "good family." He was a construction worker until the age of 27, when he joined the U.S. Army. He was soon discharged after injuring himself during basic training. After his injury, he started drinking heavily, leading to his homelessness and alcoholism. In the early 1990s, he moved to California, where he was approached by Ryan McPherson to appear in Bumfights.

== Bumfights ==
"I just wanted some money to get drunk, so I did what he told me to. I never had any idea the stuff he was filming would become what it did."

— Rufus Hannah, quoted in a 2006 New York Times report

He subsequently was filmed performing other "stunts" for the Bumfights videos, including riding a shopping cart down a flight of stairs, ramming his head into steel doors so hard that he had seizures, and beating up Donald "Donnie" Brennan, another homeless man, so badly that Brennan's leg was broken in two places and required surgical intervention. Brennan, an army veteran, and Hannah (who was injured in basic training), were paid an average of $10 per stunt. Both men were also paid to get Bumfights tattoos: Hannah's tattoo was across his knuckles and Brennan's was on his forehead.

In 2002, Hannah and Brennan testified in the criminal trials of the producers of Bumfights on several charges, including the soliciting of felonies; the defendants were acquitted on the majority of charges and sentenced to community service for conspiring to stage an illegal fight (in 2005, they were sentenced to 6 months in prison for having failed to complete the community service).

Hannah and Brennan also filed a civil suit against the producers; the producers agreed to pay an unspecified amount in damages, and to no longer use Hannah and Brennan's images for promotional purposes.

== After Bumfights ==
Hannah remained sober from 2003 until his death. He worked as a property manager, and spent 40 hours a week performing such duties as painting apartments and constructing fences. He married his wife in 2005 and together they had 4 children. He hoped to one day get the 'Bum Fights' tattoo removed from his knuckles. In 2010 he released a book co-written with Barry Soper entitled A Bum Deal: An Unlikely Journey from Hopeless to Humanitarian detailing his ordeal from becoming a homeless alcoholic, his time during the filming of Bumfights, and his struggle to get sober. In addition, he worked with the National Coalition for the Homeless.

=== Death ===
On October 4, 2017, Hannah was killed in Swainsboro when the car he was riding in as a passenger was hit by a truck.
