= Stillmore, Georgia =

- City
- Location in Emanuel County and the state of Georgia
- Coordinates: 32°26′28″N 82°12′53″W
- Country: United States
- State: Georgia
- County: Emanuel

Area
  - Total: 3.20 sq mi (8.29 km^{2})
  - Land: 3.09 sq mi (8.01 km^{2})
  - Water: 0.11 sq mi (0.28 km^{2})
- Elevation: 260 ft (80 m)

Population (2020)
  - Total: 439
  - Density: 142.0/sq mi (54.83/km^{2})
- Time zone: UTC-5 (Eastern (EST))
  - Summer (DST): UTC-4 (EDT)
- ZIP code: 30464
- Area code: 912
- FIPS code: 13-73620
- GNIS feature ID: 0356564

Stillmore is a city in Emanuel County, Georgia, United States. The population was 439 in 2020.

== History ==
An early variant name was "Kea's Mill". According to tradition, the town's present name stems from the offer by postal officials to supply "still more" names if their list of suitable names for the post office was not satisfactory.

== Geography ==
Stillmore is located in southeastern Emanuel County at 32°26′28″N 82°12′53″W (32.441176, -82.214637). Georgia State Route 57 passes through the town, leading northwest 14 miles (23 km) to Swainsboro, the county seat, and southeast 5 miles (8 km) to Interstate 16 at Exit 98. Georgia State Route 192 crosses GA 57 in the center of Stillmore, leading northeast 11 miles (18 km) to Twin City and west 5 miles (8 km) to U.S. Route 1.

According to the United States Census Bureau, Stillmore has a total area of 3.2 square miles (8.3 km^{2}), of which 3.1 square miles (8.0 km^{2}) is land and 0.1 square miles (0.3 km^{2}), or 3.39%, is water.

== Demographics ==
Historical population
| Census | Pop. | Note | %± |
|---|---|---|---|
| 1900 | 741 | | — |
| 1910 | 645 | | −13.0% |
| 1920 | 916 | | 42.0% |
| 1930 | 618 | | −32.5% |
| 1940 | 493 | | −20.2% |
| 1950 | 420 | | −14.8% |
| 1960 | 354 | | −15.7% |
| 1970 | 522 | | 47.5% |
| 1980 | 527 | | 1.0% |
| 1990 | 615 | | 16.7% |
| 2000 | 730 | | 18.7% |
| 2010 | 532 | | −27.1% |
| 2020 | 439 | | −17.5% |
U.S. Decennial Census

As of the census of 2000, there were 730 people, 220 households, and 159 families residing in the town. By 2020, its population declined to 439.

== Education ==
Stillmore is home to the David Emanuel Academy (DEA), a Christian school. Local public school students are zoned to attend Emanuel County School District schools, including Swainsboro High School.

== Notable residents ==
- George L. Smith, former Speaker of the Georgia House of Representatives

== In the media ==
The town is the setting for Stillmore, Georgia, a play written, produced, and directed by Brad Ogden.
