= Modoc, Georgia =

Unincorporated community in Georgia, U.S.

Coordinates: 32°39′21″N 82°18′33″W

Modoc is an unincorporated community in Emanuel County, in the U.S. state of Georgia. Modoc is located approximately 4.5 miles (7 km) northeast of the Emanuel County seat of Swainsboro.

== History ==
A post office called Modoc was established in 1888, and remained in operation until 1929. The community was named after the Modoc Indians.

The Georgia General Assembly incorporated Modoc as a town in 1912. The town's municipal charter was repealed in 1995.
