= Statesboro Northern Railway =

United States rail company (founded 1924)

The Statesboro Northern Railway began operating in 1924 on 44 miles of former Midland Railway between Statesboro, Georgia and Stevens Crossing, Georgia. It was immediately leased by the Georgia and Florida Railway, and was completely abandoned in 1950.
