= McBean, Georgia =

Unincorporated community in Georgia, U.S.

Coordinates: 33°14′37″N 81°57′02″W

McBean is an unincorporated community in Richmond County, in the U.S. state of Georgia.

== History ==
The community takes its name from nearby McBean Creek. A variant name is "McBean Depot". A post office was established at McBean in 1846, and remained in operation until 1962.
