= Cuyler and Woodburn Railroad =

The Cuyler and Woodburn Railroad (C&W) was a former railroad in the state of Georgia, United States. The 13-mile (21 km) line was built in 1894 by James and William Woods. The tram railroad ran between the town Cuyler and the Wood's sawmill in Woodburn, Georgia. The railroad built an additional line to Statesboro, Georgia. The railroad was sold under foreclosure in 1897 and was reorganized as the Savannah and Statesboro Railway (S&S).
