= Emanuel County, Georgia =

County in Georgia, United States

- County
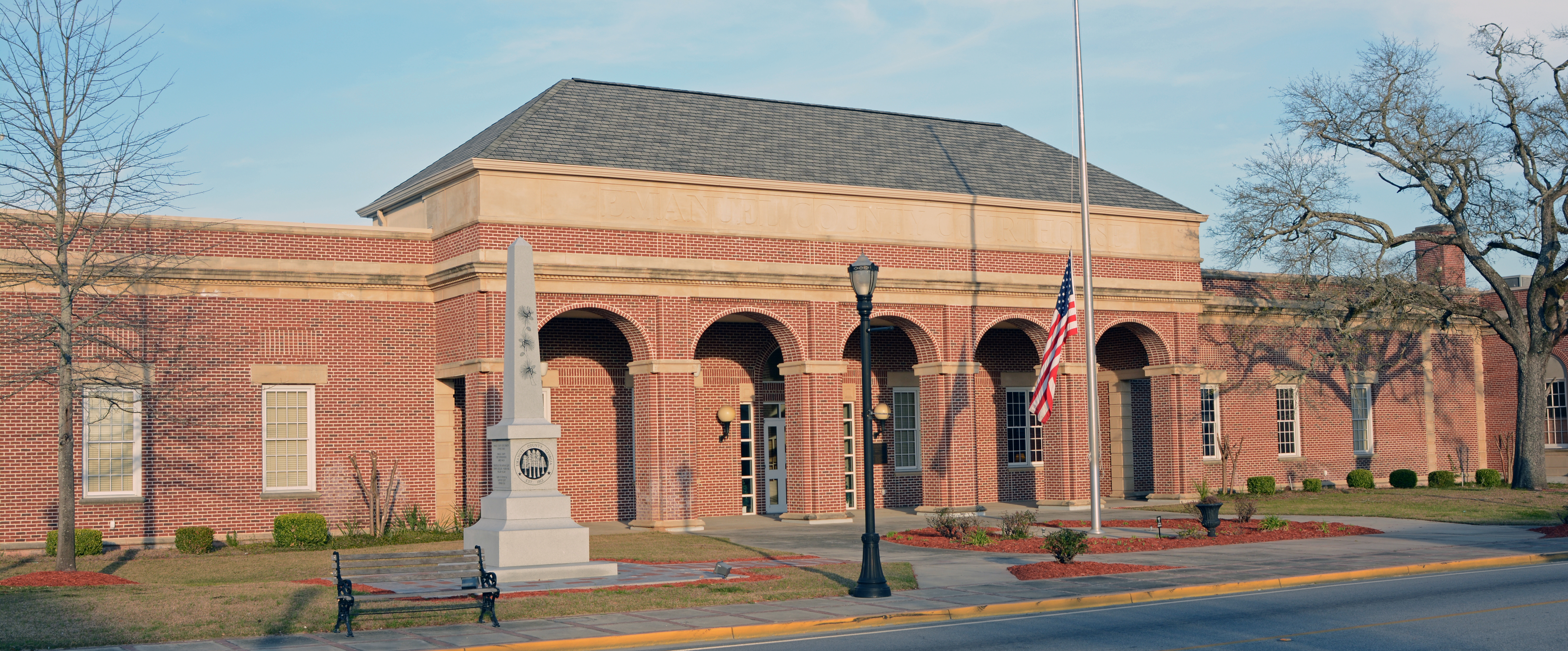
- Emanuel County Courthouse

- Seal

- Location within the U.S. state of Georgia
- Coordinates: 32°35′N 82°18′W
- Country: United States
- State: Georgia
- Founded: 1812; 214 years ago
- Named for: David Emanuel
- Seat: Swainsboro
- Largest city: Swainsboro

Area
  - Total: 690 sq mi (1,800 km^{2})
  - Land: 681 sq mi (1,760 km^{2})
  - Water: 9.6 sq mi (25 km^{2}) 1.4%

Population (2020)
  - Total: 22,768
  - Estimate (2025): 23,147 ▲
  - Density: 33/sq mi (13/km^{2})
- Time zone: UTC−5 (Eastern)
  - Summer (DST): UTC−4 (EDT)
- Congressional district: 12th
- Website: Emanuel County, Georgia

Emanuel County is a county located in the eastern portion, or "Classic South" region of the U.S. state of Georgia. As of the 2020 census, the population was 22,768. The county seat is Swainsboro.

== History ==
The county was created on December 10, 1812, by an act of the Georgia General Assembly from land originally in parts of Bulloch and Montgomery counties. Emanuel County is named in honor of former Governor of Georgia David Emanuel.

Portions of Johnson (1858), Jenkins (1905), Toombs (1905), Candler (1914), and Treutlen (1918) counties were taken from Emanuel's original borders.

=== Courthouses ===
Emanuel County has had seven courthouses in its over 200 years of existence. In the county's early years, the court met at Steven Rich's home. Emanuel County's first courthouse was erected in 1814 and burned in 1841. It wasn't until 1854, the same time that the city of Swainsboro was formally incorporated, that the county was allowed to build a replacement. In a string of bad luck, this new courthouse burned in 1855 and was replaced by another courthouse, which burned in 1857. Emanuel County's fourth courthouse burned in 1919 and was replaced by a three-story brick structure which, characteristically, burned in 1938. The next courthouse, a two-story marble structure, was built in 1940 and was the first courthouse in Emanuel County's history not to be destroyed by fire. However, by the 1990s, the courthouse's cramped and deteriorating condition caused several county offices to vacate the courthouse and move into vacant office space surrounding the courthouse square. The courthouse was demolished in the spring of 2000, leaving only the sheriff's office annex. In the late 1990s, the Emanuel County commissioners purchased the former U.S. Post Office building, which was built in 1936, to serve as an interim courthouse. In 2000, the county commission acquired land adjacent to the old Post Office to build a new courthouse and sheriff's office. Emanuel County's current courthouse, a large, single-story brick structure incorporating the old Post Office building, was completed in 2002, and a city square was built on the former courthouse site with the old sheriff's office renovated to serve as the city's visitors' center as well as the office for Swainsboro-Emanuel County Chamber of Commerce.

== Geography ==
According to the U.S. Census Bureau, the county has a total area of 690 square miles (1,800 km^{2}), of which 681 square miles (1,760 km^{2}) is land and 9.6 square miles (25 km^{2}) (1.4%) is water.

The northern portion of Emanuel County, centered on Summertown and defined by a southern border heading from Garfield east-northeast and running north of Modoc, is located in the Upper Ogeechee River sub-basin of the Ogeechee River basin. The eastern portion of the county, east of Swainsboro, is located in the Canoochee River sub-basin of the same Ogeechee River basin. The western and southern portions of Emanuel County are located in the Ohoopee River sub-basin of the Altamaha River basin.

=== Major highways ===
- I-16 / SR 404 (Jim Gillis Historic Savannah Parkway) – SR 404 is the unsigned designation for I-16
- US 1 / SR 4
  - US 1 Bus. / SR 4 Bus. (Swainsboro)
- US 80 / SR 26
- US 221 / SR 171
- SR 15
- SR 23
  - SR 23 Spur (Twin City)
- SR 46
- SR 56
- SR 57
- SR 78
- SR 86
- SR 121
- SR 192
- SR 297

=== Adjacent counties ===
- Jefferson County - north
- Jenkins County - northeast
- Burke County - northeast
- Candler County - east
- Tattnall County - southeast
- Bulloch County - southeast
- Toombs County - south
- Johnson County - west
- Treutlen County - west

== Communities ==
=== Cities ===
- Adrian
- Garfield
- Nunez
- Oak Park
- Stillmore
- Summertown
- Swainsboro
- Twin City

=== Census-designated places ===
- Canoochee
- Norristown

=== Unincorporated communities ===
- Five Points, Georgia
- Stevens Crossing, Georgia

== Demographics ==
Historical population
Census	Pop.	Note	%±
1820	2,928		—
1830	2,673		−8.7%
1840	3,129		17.1%
1850	4,577		46.3%
1860	5,081		11.0%
1870	6,134		20.7%
1880	9,759		59.1%
1890	14,703		50.7%
1900	21,279		44.7%
1910	25,140		18.1%
1920	25,862		2.9%
1930	24,101		−6.8%
1940	23,517		−2.4%
1950	19,789		−15.9%
1960	17,815		−10.0%
1970	18,189		2.1%
1980	20,795		14.3%
1990	20,546		−1.2%
2000	21,837		6.3%
2010	22,598		3.5%
2020	22,768		0.8%
2025 (est.)	23,147	▲	1.7%
U.S. Decennial Census; 1790-1880 1890-1910; 1920-1930 1930-1940; 1940-1950 1960-1980; 1980-2000 2010

=== Racial and ethnic composition ===
Emanuel County, Georgia – Racial and ethnic composition Note: the US Census treats Hispanic/Latino as an ethnic category. This table excludes Latinos from the racial categories and assigns them to a separate category. Hispanics/Latinos may be of any race.
Race / Ethnicity (NH = Non-Hispanic)	Pop 1980	Pop 1990	Pop 2000	Pop 2010	Pop 2020	% 1980	% 1990	% 2000	% 2010	% 2020
White alone (NH)	14,119	13,738	13,663	13,733	13,815	67.90%	66.86%	62.57%	60.77%	60.68%
Black or African American alone (NH)	6,491	6,665	7,253	7,541	7,246	31.21%	32.44%	33.21%	33.37%	31.83%
Native American or Alaska Native alone (NH)	7	20	27	46	33	0.03%	0.10%	0.12%	0.20%	0.14%
Asian alone (NH)	16	41	44	154	141	0.08%	0.20%	0.20%	0.68%	0.62%
Native Hawaiian or Pacific Islander alone (NH)	x	x	1	3	2	x	x	0.00%	0.01%	0.01%
Other race alone (NH)	4	0	12	33	40	0.02%	0.00%	0.05%	0.15%	0.18%
Mixed race or Multiracial (NH)	x	x	92	167	498	x	x	0.42%	0.74%	2.19%
Hispanic or Latino (any race)	158	82	745	921	993	0.76%	0.40%	3.41%	4.08%	4.36%
Total	20,795	20,546	21,837	22,598	22,768	100.00%	100.00%	100.00%	100.00%	100.00%

=== 2020 census ===
As of the 2020 census, the county had a population of 22,768, with 8,644 households and 5,683 families; the median age was 39.5 years, 23.9% of residents were under the age of 18, and 18.0% of residents were 65 years of age or older. 31.8% of residents lived in urban areas, while 68.2% lived in rural areas.

For every 100 females there were 90.7 males, and for every 100 females age 18 and over there were 86.5 males age 18 and over.

The racial makeup of the county was 61.6% White, 31.9% Black or African American, 0.3% American Indian and Alaska Native, 0.6% Asian, 0.0% Native Hawaiian and Pacific Islander, 2.5% from some other race, and 3.1% from two or more races. Hispanic or Latino residents of any race comprised 4.4% of the population.

Of the 8,644 households, 32.2% had children under the age of 18 living with them and 33.2% had a female householder with no spouse or partner present. About 29.4% of all households were made up of individuals and 13.8% had someone living alone who was 65 years of age or older.

There were 9,962 housing units, of which 13.2% were vacant. Among occupied housing units, 63.4% were owner-occupied and 36.6% were renter-occupied. The homeowner vacancy rate was 1.2% and the rental vacancy rate was 7.4%.

== Politics ==
As of the 2020s, Emanuel County is a Republican stronghold, voting 72% for Donald Trump in 2024. Since 1964, the only times the county has failed to back a Republican candidate in a presidential election were when southern Democrats Jimmy Carter and Bill Clinton were on the ballot.

For elections to the United States House of Representatives, Emanuel County is part of Georgia's 12th congressional district, currently represented by Rick Allen. For elections to the Georgia State Senate, Emanuel County is part of District 23. For elections to the Georgia House of Representatives, Emanuel County is part of district 158.

United States presidential election results for Emanuel County, Georgia
Year	Republican		Democratic		Third party(ies)	
Year	No.	%	No.	%	No.	%
1912	22	2.54%	715	82.56%	129	14.90%
1916	28	1.56%	1,500	83.61%	266	14.83%
1920	190	11.63%	1,444	88.37%	0	0.00%
1924	39	5.04%	710	91.73%	25	3.23%
1928	355	24.81%	1,076	75.19%	0	0.00%
1932	33	1.34%	2,420	98.49%	4	0.16%
1936	125	6.01%	1,943	93.37%	13	0.62%
1940	81	5.36%	1,428	94.51%	2	0.13%
1944	317	16.23%	1,635	83.72%	1	0.05%
1948	717	29.90%	1,436	59.88%	245	10.22%
1952	661	20.01%	2,642	79.99%	0	0.00%
1956	678	22.22%	2,373	77.78%	0	0.00%
1960	1,120	30.83%	2,513	69.17%	0	0.00%
1964	3,311	59.23%	2,279	40.77%	0	0.00%
1968	1,297	21.22%	1,508	24.67%	3,307	54.11%
1972	3,684	80.09%	916	19.91%	0	0.00%
1976	1,493	24.49%	4,603	75.51%	0	0.00%
1980	2,199	35.18%	3,971	63.53%	81	1.30%
1984	3,920	61.46%	2,458	38.54%	0	0.00%
1988	3,530	58.95%	2,387	39.86%	71	1.19%
1992	2,662	41.43%	2,951	45.93%	812	12.64%
1996	2,451	41.73%	2,947	50.18%	475	8.09%
2000	3,343	53.38%	2,835	45.27%	85	1.36%
2004	4,666	62.44%	2,774	37.12%	33	0.44%
2008	5,110	61.92%	3,068	37.18%	74	0.90%
2012	5,100	63.05%	2,927	36.18%	62	0.77%
2016	5,335	67.57%	2,435	30.84%	126	1.60%
2020	6,553	68.93%	2,886	30.36%	68	0.72%
2024	6,919	71.93%	2,673	27.79%	27	0.28%

United States Senate election results for Emanuel County, Georgia2
Year	Republican		Democratic		Third party(ies)	
Year	No.	%	No.	%	No.	%
2020	6,513	69.52%	2,720	29.04%	135	1.44%
2020	5,807	69.51%	2,547	30.49%	0	0.00%

United States Senate election results for Emanuel County, Georgia3
Year	Republican		Democratic		Third party(ies)	
Year	No.	%	No.	%	No.	%
2020	3,061	33.30%	1,692	18.41%	4,438	48.29%
2020	5,787	69.26%	2,569	30.74%	0	0.00%
2022	5,329	70.64%	2,157	28.59%	58	0.77%
2022	5,033	70.65%	2,091	29.35%	0	0.00%

Georgia Gubernatorial election results for Emanuel County
Year	Republican		Democratic		Third party(ies)	
Year	No.	%	No.	%	No.	%
2022	5,505	72.80%	2,024	26.77%	33	0.44%

== Education ==
The Emanuel County School District has seven schools,including the Swainsboro High School.

== See also ==
- National Register of Historic Places listings in Emanuel County, Georgia
- List of counties in Georgia
