= Ohoopee River =

River in the United States of America

Coordinates: 31.90159°N 82.11512°W

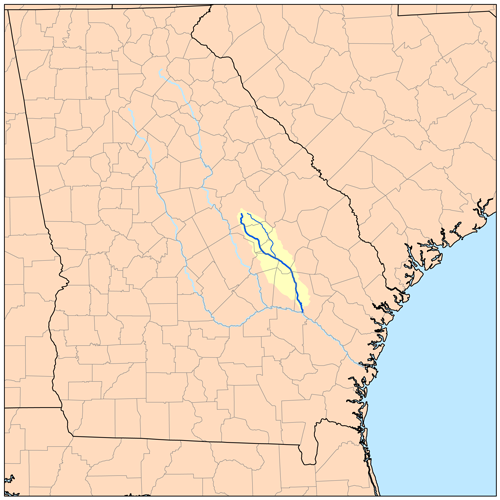

The Ohoopee River is a 119-mile-long (192 km) river in east-central Georgia in the United States. It is a tributary of the Altamaha River, which flows to the Atlantic Ocean.

== Course ==
The Ohoopee River rises in Washington County, about 2 miles (3 km) south of Tennille, and flows generally southeastwardly, through or along the boundaries of Johnson, Emanuel, Treutlen, Candler, Toombs and Tattnall Counties. It joins the Altamaha River 13 miles (21 km) south of Reidsville.

In Emanuel County, it collects the Little Ohoopee River, about 54 miles (87 km) long, which rises in Washington County and flows generally southeastwardly through Johnson and Emanuel Counties, past Kite.

== In popular culture ==
The Ohoopee River is referenced in Larry Jon Wilson's song, "Ohoopee River Bottomland", which appears on Wilson's 1975 album, New Beginnings. Wilson also sings the song in the 1980 documentary, Heartworn Highways. Wilson was born in Swainsboro, just north of the Ohoopee River.

The river valley has recently become the site of a yearly music festival known as "Curly Fest" featuring regional artists.

Local people pronounce the double o as short, not long. That is, more like "foot," than "boot." They also call it the 'Hoopee for short.

== Tributaries ==
- Sardis Creek

== See also ==
- List of Georgia rivers
