= Kettle Creek (Satilla River tributary) =

Stream in Georgia, U.S.

Coordinates: 31°15′50.78″N 82°21′30.46″W

Kettle Creek is a stream in the U.S. state of Georgia. It is a tributary to the Satilla River.

Kettle Creek was named from an incident when an iron kettle was found by soldiers along its banks.
