= Moxley, Georgia =

Community in Georgia

Coordinates: 32°55′11″N 82°23′28″W

Moxley is an unincorporated community in Jefferson County, in the U.S. state of Georgia.

== History ==
A post office called Moxley was established in 1881, and remained in operation until 1914. The community was named after B. J. Moxley, the proprietor of a local gristmill and country store.
