= Midland Railway (Georgia) =

The Midland Railway was founded in 1915 by George M. Brinson. The railroad had planned to build a line from Savannah to Stevens Crossing, Georgia, USA to connect with the Georgia and Florida Railway. By the start of 1916, the railroad had built from Savannah to Statesboro and later purchased the Savannah, Augusta and Northern Railway to complete the line. In 1922 the railroad was facing bankruptcy and the line from Statesboro to Savannah was abandoned the next year. The remainder of the Midland Railway line was leased by the Georgia and Florida Railway in 1924. The company also was reorganized as the Statesboro Northern Railway in 1924.
