= Bumfights =

Video series showing various fights between people

Bumfights is an American video series produced by Indecline Films. The debut release titled Bumfights Vol. 1: A Cause for Concern (2001) features primarily high school student fights caught on tape and homeless men (most notably Rufus Hannah and Donnie Brennan) in the San Diego, San Francisco, Los Angeles, and Las Vegas metropolitan areas attempting amateur stunts in a style similar to the MTV series Jackass, and in one case, a fight between two homeless men resulting in severe injuries. It was produced by Ryen McPherson, Zachary Bubeck, Daniel J. Tanner, and Michael Slyman.

The video series immediately received widespread criticism. In 2002, two of the homeless men depicted filed a lawsuit against the producers alleging they were paid to hurt themselves and beat each other. In April 2006, the four original filmmakers surrendered rights to produce any more Bumfights videos or distribute videos already made, and were obliged to pay compensation to three of the homeless men depicted in the videos, under a settlement announced shortly before the 2002 lawsuit was due to go to trial.

== Production ==
The videos were originally produced in the early 2000s. The videos had gained such popularity that, by 2002, there were large volumes of sales and merchandise. Around that time, the four original founders sold the business to two Las Vegas businessmen, who went by the pseudonyms Ty Beeson and Ray Leticia, for $1.5 million USD. Beeson and Leticia released the three following videos, volumes 2– 4, including footage that was provided as part of their purchase of the business.

== Reception ==
By June 2002, 250,000 copies of the first volume of the series were reported sold for $22 each, according to Wired magazine. Community complaints led to the police investigating whether any laws were broken by producers. Advocacy groups were critical of the video.

== Series overview ==
- Bumfights Vol. 1: A Cause for Concern (2002)
- Bumfights Vol. 2: Bumlife (2003)
- Bumfights Vol. 3: The Felony Footage (2004)
- Bumfights Vol. 4: Return of Ruckus (2006)

Ryen McPherson moved on to produce a similar reality video called Indecline: Vol. 1—It's Worse Than You Think. Though controversial for its fight footage and acts of elaborate graffiti art, legal troubles did not hinder the sales of this video, although the website went offline in June 2008. The Indecline web site went back online in November 2008.

== Appearance on Dr. Phil ==
Phil McGraw, host of the talk show Dr. Phil, invited "Beeson" to guest on the show on December 12, 2006. "Beeson" attended the interview dressed in a Dr. Phil costume and a shaved head in imitation of Dr. Phil himself. After some Bumfights clips were previewed to the audience, Dr. Phil immediately declined to interview Beeson with security menacing the Bumfights representative to be escorted from the stage. While briefly onstage, "Beeson" criticized Dr. Phil's hypocrisy; being outraged over their exploitation of the poor while he himself exploited people in distress for entertainment on his show. Dr. Phil revealed in the next segment he himself had been homeless. McPherson and Slyman later claimed that the man who appeared on the show was not the actual person who usually uses the Beeson alias, but in fact a stand-in. The whole setup was organized by the "real" Beeson and Leticia.
