= Shell Bluff, Georgia =

Unincorporated community in Georgia, U.S.

Coordinates: 33°08′53″N 81°53′52″W

Shell Bluff is an unincorporated community in Burke County, in the U.S. state of Georgia.

== History ==
A post office called Shell Bluff was established in 1889, and remained in operation until 1913. The community was named for a nearby fossil bed on the Savannah River. The Vogtle Electric Generating Plant is located near the area.
