= Boggy Gut Creek =

Stream in Georgia, U.S.

Coordinates: 33°13′45″N 81°49′45″W

Boggy Gut Creek is a stream in the U.S. state of Georgia. It is a tributary to the Savannah River.

Boggy Gut Creek was so named on account of the boggy soil near its course.
