= Summertown, Georgia =

- City
- Location in Emanuel County and the state of Georgia
- Coordinates: 32°44′48″N 82°16′34″W
- Country: United States
- State: Georgia
- County: Emanuel

Area
  - Total: 0.79 sq mi (2.05 km^{2})
  - Land: 0.79 sq mi (2.04 km^{2})
  - Water: 0.0039 sq mi (0.01 km^{2})
- Elevation: 253 ft (77 m)

Population (2020)
  - Total: 121
  - Density: 154/sq mi (59.4/km^{2})
- Time zone: UTC-5 (Eastern (EST))
  - Summer (DST): UTC-4 (EDT)
- ZIP code: 30401
- Area code: 478
- FIPS code: 13-74348
- GNIS feature ID: 0323743

Summertown is a city in Emanuel County, Georgia, United States. The population was 121 in 2020.

== History ==
Summertown was originally built up as a summer retreat, hence the name. The Georgia General Assembly incorporated Summertown as a town in 1906.

== Geography ==
Summertown is located in northern Emanuel County at 32°44′48″N 82°16′34″W (32.746532, -82.276182). Georgia State Route 56 passes through the east side of the city limits, leading north 5 miles (8 km) to Midville and south 11 miles (18 km) to Swainsboro, the county seat.

According to the United States Census Bureau, Summertown has a total area of 0.77 square miles (2.0 km^{2}), of which 0.004 square miles (0.01 km^{2}), or 0.54%, is water.

== Demographics ==
Historical population
Census	Pop.	Note	%±
1970	159		—
1980	215		35.2%
1990	153		−28.8%
2000	140		−8.5%
2010	160		14.3%
2020	121		−24.4%
U.S. Decennial Census

As of the census of 2000, there were 140 people, 48 households, and 34 families residing in the town. By 2020, its population declined to 121.
