= Stevens Crossing, Georgia =

Unincorporated settlement in Emanuel County, Georgia, US

Coordinates: 32°46′22″N 82°15′16″W

Stevens Crossing, is a small rural community in Emanuel County, Georgia, United States.

== History ==
The community of Stevens Crossing was named after the junction of the Midland Railway with the Georgia and Florida Railroad mainline that was constructed on the land of Ben B. Stevens in the early 20th century. A United States Post Office at Stevens Crossing, and a Georgia & Florida depot at Stevens Crossing began operations in 1914, as did the Sutton and Stevens saw mill. The post office ceased operations in March 1939; the Stevens Crossing to Statesboro line was abandoned in 1950, and the depot and the old Midland Railway tracks removed several years later.

In 2004, the Heart of Georgia Railroad subleased the portion of the old Georgia & Florida mainline that ran from Midville to Vidalia. Today, several descendants of the Stevens and Coleman families live in the community, and the community is also home to the Stevens Crossing Dove Club, owned and operated by a grandson of Ben B. Stevens.

== Geography ==
The Stevens Family Cemetery is located about one half mile west of the actual old crossing on Stevens Cemetery Road.
