= Bobby Jones Expressway =

The Bobby Jones Expressway is a roadway in the U.S. state of Georgia that is named for golfer Bobby Jones. It follows:

- Georgia State Route 232's easternmost 1.1 miles (1.8 km) (from its intersection with SR 104 and Old Evans Road in Martinez to its eastern terminus in Augusta
- Interstate 520 in Georgia's entire portion within the state of Georgia, completely within Augusta.
