= Swainsboro High School =

Location
- 689 South Main Street; Swainsboro, Georgia 30401; United States; 32.577669°N 82.317062°W

Information
- School district: Emanuel County School District
- Principal: Brandon Andrews
- Teaching staff: 62.30 FTE
- Grades: 9–12
- Enrollment: 813 (2023–2024)
- Student to teacher ratio: 13.05
- Colors: Black and gold
- Athletics: GHSA
- Athletics conference: 3B AA
- Mascot: Tiger
- Team name: Tigers
- Accreditation: Southern Association of Colleges and Schools; Georgia Accrediting Commission
- Feeder schools: Swainsboro Middle School
- Telephone: (478) 237-2267
- Fax: (478) 237-3810
- Website: https://shs.emanuel.k12.ga.us/

Swainsboro High School is a public high school located in Swainsboro, Georgia, United States. The school is part of the Emanuel County School District, which serves Emanuel County.

== Notable alumni ==
- Jane Grier Durden, president general of the United Daughters of the Confederacy
- Demello Jones, football player
