= McBean Creek =

Stream in Georgia, United States

Coordinates: 33°14′50.53″N 81°51′8.41″W

McBean Creek is a stream in the U.S. state of Georgia. It is a tributary to the Savannah River.

McBean Creek was named after one Mr. McBean, a pioneer settler in the 18th century.
