= Garfield, Georgia =

- City
- Location in Emanuel County and the state of Georgia
- Coordinates: 32°39′2″N 82°5′47″W
- Country: United States
- State: Georgia
- County: Emanuel

Area
  - Total: 0.80 sq mi (2.06 km^{2})
  - Land: 0.79 sq mi (2.04 km^{2})
  - Water: 0.0077 sq mi (0.02 km^{2})
- Elevation: 279 ft (85 m)

Population (2020)
  - Total: 257
  - Density: 326.0/sq mi (125.88/km^{2})
- Time zone: UTC-5 (Eastern (EST))
  - Summer (DST): UTC-4 (EDT)
- ZIP code: 30425
- Area code: 478
- FIPS code: 13-32188
- GNIS feature ID: 0331791

Garfield is a city in Emanuel County, Georgia, United States. The population was 257 in 2020.

== History ==
The Georgia General Assembly incorporated the place as the Town of Garfield in 1905.

== Geography ==
Garfield is located in eastern Emanuel County. Georgia State Route 23 passes through the city.

According to the United States Census Bureau, Garfield has a total area of 0.81 square miles (2.1 km^{2}), of which 0.01 square miles (0.02 km^{2}), or 0.86%, is water.

== Demographics ==
Historical population
Census	Pop.	Note	%±
1910	319		—
1920	416		30.4%
1930	342		−17.8%
1940	291		−14.9%
1950	213		−26.8%
1960	225		5.6%
1970	214		−4.9%
1980	222		3.7%
1990	255		14.9%
2000	152		−40.4%
2010	201		32.2%
2020	257		27.9%
U.S. Decennial Census

As of the census of 2000, there were 152 people, 65 households, and 46 families residing in the town. By the 2020 census, its population increased to 257.
