= Swainsboro, Georgia =

- City
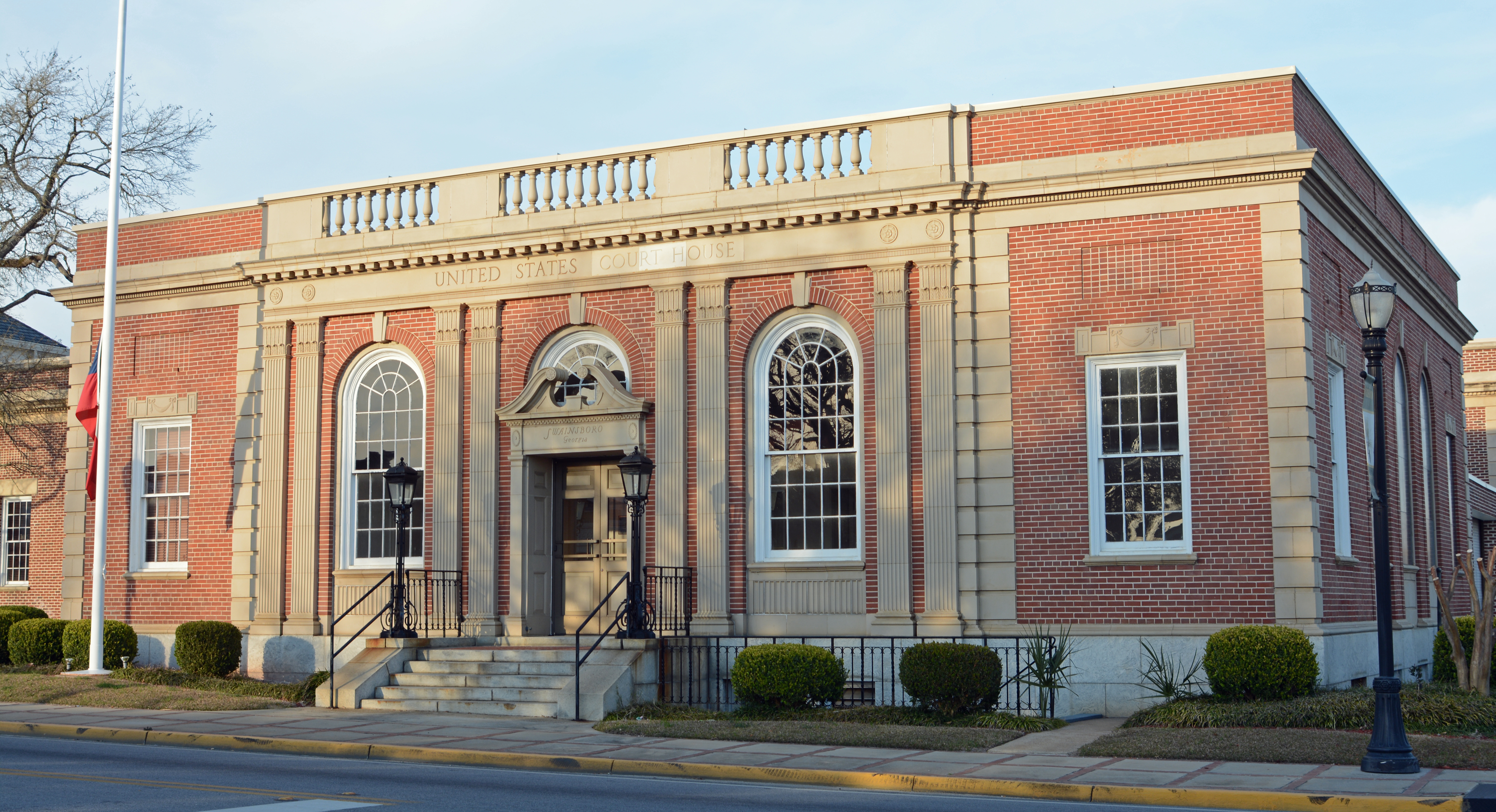
- United States Courthouse in Swainsboro

- Flag Seal Logo
- Nickname: "Crossroads of the Great South"
- Location in Emanuel County and the state of Georgia
- Coordinates: 32°35′37″N 82°19′56″W
- Country: United States
- State: Georgia
- County: Emanuel

Government
  - Mayor: Lillian Brown

Area
  - Total: 12.94 sq mi (33.52 km^{2})
  - Land: 12.58 sq mi (32.58 km^{2})
  - Water: 0.36 sq mi (0.94 km^{2})
- Elevation: 325 ft (99 m)

Population (2020)
  - Total: 7,425
  - Density: 590.3/sq mi (227.91/km^{2})
- Time zone: UTC-5 (Eastern (EST))
  - Summer (DST): UTC-4 (EDT)
- ZIP code: 30401
- Area code: 478
- FIPS code: 13-74964
- GNIS feature ID: 0356574
- Website: cityofswainsboro.org

Swainsboro is a city in Emanuel County, Georgia, United States. As of the 2020 census, the city had a population of 7,425. The city is the county seat of Emanuel County.

== History ==
In 1822, the Georgia state legislature established "Swainsborough" as the seat of Emanuel County. The town was named in recognition of Stephen Swain, the state senator who introduced the bill for the county's creation in 1812. The town's name was changed to "Paris" at its incorporation on February 18, 1854, but three years later reverted to its current name, Swainsboro.

=== Transportation ===
Early in its corporate life, much like other rural Georgia towns, Swainsboro depended on railroads for transportation. However, in the 1930s, many of the town's streets and sidewalks were paved, and Swainsboro found itself at the intersection of two major national highways, U.S. 1 and U.S. 80, thus earning its city motto: "Crossroads of the Great South". U.S. 1 was the principal highway from Maine to Key West, and U.S. 80, at that time, ran from Tybee Island, Georgia, to San Diego.

== Geography ==
Swainsboro is located near the center of Emanuel County at 32°35'37" North, 82°19'56" West (32.593743, -82.332146). U.S. Route 80 passes through the center of the city, and U.S. Route 1 bypasses it to the west. US 80 leads east 36 miles (58 km) to Statesboro and west 36 miles (58 km) to Dublin, while US 1 leads north 62 miles (100 km) to Augusta and south 106 miles (171 km) to Waycross. Interstate 16 is 14 miles (23 km) south of Swainsboro via US 1.

According to the United States Census Bureau, the city has a total area of 12.9 square miles (33.5 km^{2}), of which 12.6 square miles (32.6 km^{2}) is land and 0.35 square miles (0.9 km^{2}), or 2.81%, is water.

== Demographics ==
Historical population
| Census | Pop. | Note | %± |
|---|---|---|---|
| 1870 | 108 | | — |
| 1880 | 186 | | 72.2% |
| 1890 | 395 | | 112.4% |
| 1900 | 895 | | 126.6% |
| 1910 | 1,313 | | 46.7% |
| 1920 | 1,578 | | 20.2% |
| 1930 | 2,442 | | 54.8% |
| 1940 | 3,575 | | 46.4% |
| 1950 | 4,300 | | 20.3% |
| 1960 | 5,943 | | 38.2% |
| 1970 | 7,325 | | 23.3% |
| 1980 | 7,602 | | 3.8% |
| 1990 | 7,361 | | −3.2% |
| 2000 | 6,943 | | −5.7% |
| 2010 | 7,277 | | 4.8% |
| 2020 | 7,425 | | 2.0% |
U.S. Decennial Census

=== 2020 census ===
As of the 2020 census, Swainsboro had a population of 7,425. There were 2,697 households and 1,783 families residing in the city.

The median age was 35.7 years. 25.2% of residents were under the age of 18 and 16.5% of residents were 65 years of age or older. For every 100 females there were 74.3 males, and for every 100 females age 18 and over there were 65.4 males age 18 and over.

85.8% of residents lived in urban areas, while 14.2% lived in rural areas.

Of all households, 34.6% had children under the age of 18 living in them. 27.7% were married-couple households, 19.2% were households with a male householder and no spouse or partner present, and 45.6% were households with a female householder and no spouse or partner present. About 33.6% of all households were made up of individuals, and 15.7% had someone living alone who was 65 years of age or older.

There were 3,061 housing units, of which 10.3% were vacant. The homeowner vacancy rate was 2.2% and the rental vacancy rate was 5.7%.

Swainsboro racial composition as of 2020
| Race | Num. | Perc. |
|---|---|---|
| White (non-Hispanic) | 2,684 | 36.15% |
| Black or African American (non-Hispanic) | 4,180 | 56.3% |
| Native American | 8 | 0.11% |
| Asian | 91 | 1.23% |
| Pacific Islander | 1 | 0.01% |
| Other/Mixed | 183 | 2.46% |
| Hispanic or Latino | 278 | 3.74% |

== Education ==
=== Emanuel County School District ===
The Emanuel County School District, run by the Emanuel County Board of Education, holds pre-school to grade twelve, and consists of three elementary schools, a middle school, a high school, and two academies. The district has 293 full-time teachers and over 4,664 students.

- Adrian School of Performing Arts (Closed)
- David Emanuel Academy (DEA)
- Swainsboro Elementary School (SES)
- Swainsboro Primary School (SPS)
- Twin City Elementary School (TCE)
- Swainsboro Middle School (SMS)
- Emanuel County Institute (ECI)
- Swainsboro High School (SHS)

=== Higher education ===
- East Georgia State College - Swainsboro Campus
- Southeastern Technical College - Swainsboro Campus

== Notable people ==
- Jane Grier Durden, president general of the United Daughters of the Confederacy
- Luck Flanders Gambrell, philanthropist and wife of former United States senator David Gambrell
- Ray Guy, NFL Hall of Famer, retired punter, three-time Super Bowl champion
- Dwight Howard, NBA Player (born in Swainsboro, raised in Atlanta)
- Rufus Hannah, aka "Rufus the Stunt Bum", born and raised in Swainsboro, famous for his role in the controversial Bumfights series
- Doug Johnson, record producer, songwriter, record label executive, born in Swainsboro
- Pat Mitchell, media personality and businesswoman
- Tony Mitchell, professional basketball player for the Fort Wayne Mad Ants, former Milwaukee Bucks player
- George L. Smith II, member of the Georgia House of Representatives (1944–1973) and Speaker of the same body (1959–1962, 1967–1973)
- Ben Troupe, born in Swainsboro, played high school football in Augusta, former University of Florida football standout
- Larry Jon Wilson, singer-songwriter, born in Swainsboro
