= Charlton County School District =

School district in Georgia (U.S. state)

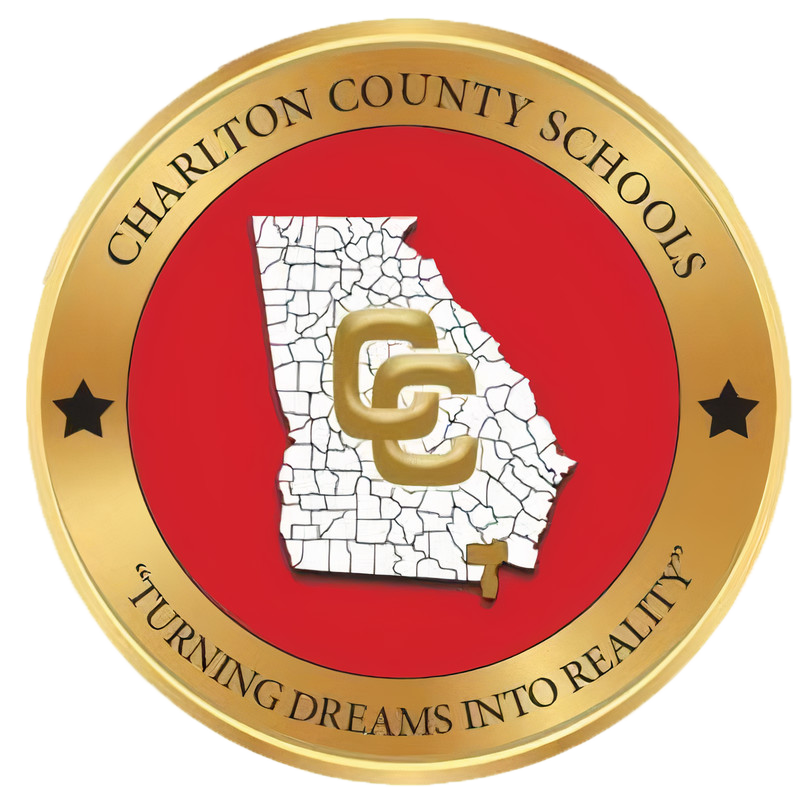

Address
- 37 Touchdown Lane Folkston, Georgia, 31537-8901; United States
- Coordinates: 30.8456°N 82.0050°W

District information
- Grades: Pre-kindergarten – 12
- Superintendent: Brent Tilley
- School board: John Canaday; Brian Kern; Deborah Young; Wesley Green
- Chair of the board: Curtis Nixon
- Accreditation: Southern Association of Colleges and Schools; Georgia Accrediting Commission

Students and staff
- Enrollment: 1,686 (2022–23)
- Faculty: 119.90 (FTE)

Other information
- Website: charlton.k12.ga.us

The Charlton County School District is a public school district in Charlton County, Georgia, United States, based in Folkston. It serves the communities of Folkston, Homeland, Moniac, and Saint George.

== Schools ==
The Charlton County School District has three elementary schools and one high school.

=== Elementary schools ===
- Bethune Middle School: Fifth Grade - Eighth Grade
- Folkston Elementary School: Pre-Kindergarten - Fourth Grade
- St. George Elementary School: Pre-Kindergarten - Sixth Grade

=== High school ===
- Charlton County High School
