= Georgia State Route 94 =

State highway in Georgia

State Route 94
- Georgia State Route 94 highlighted in red

Route information
- Maintained by GDOT
- Length: 65.2 mi (104.9 km)

Western section
- Length: 52.3 mi (84.2 km)
- West end: US 41 / SR 7 / SR 31 southeast of Valdosta
- Major intersections: US 129 / SR 11 in Statenville; US 441 / SR 89 from Fargo to southeast of Fargo
- East end: SR 2 southeast of Fargo

Eastern section
- Length: 12.9 mi (20.8 km)
- West end: SR 2 southwest of Moniac
- Major intersections: SR 185 in Moniac; SR 23 / SR 121 in St. George
- East end: CR 2 east of St. George

Location
- Country: United States
- State: Georgia
- Counties: Lowndes, Echols, Clinch, Charlton

Highway system
- Georgia State Highway System; Interstate; US; State; Special
| ← SR 93 | → I-95 |

State Route 94 (SR 94) is a 65.2-mile-long (104.9 km) state highway in the southeastern part of the U.S. state of Georgia. It exists in two distinct sections, split by the Florida state line, traveling west–east within portions of Lowndes, Echols, Clinch, and Charlton counties. It connects U.S. Route 41 (US 41) in Valdosta with Saint George, via Statenville, Needmore, and Fargo.

== Route description ==
The only portion of SR 94 that is part of the National Highway System, a system of routes determined to be important for the nation's economy, mobility, and defense, is the entire length of the US 441/SR 89 concurrency in the Fargo area.

=== Western segment ===
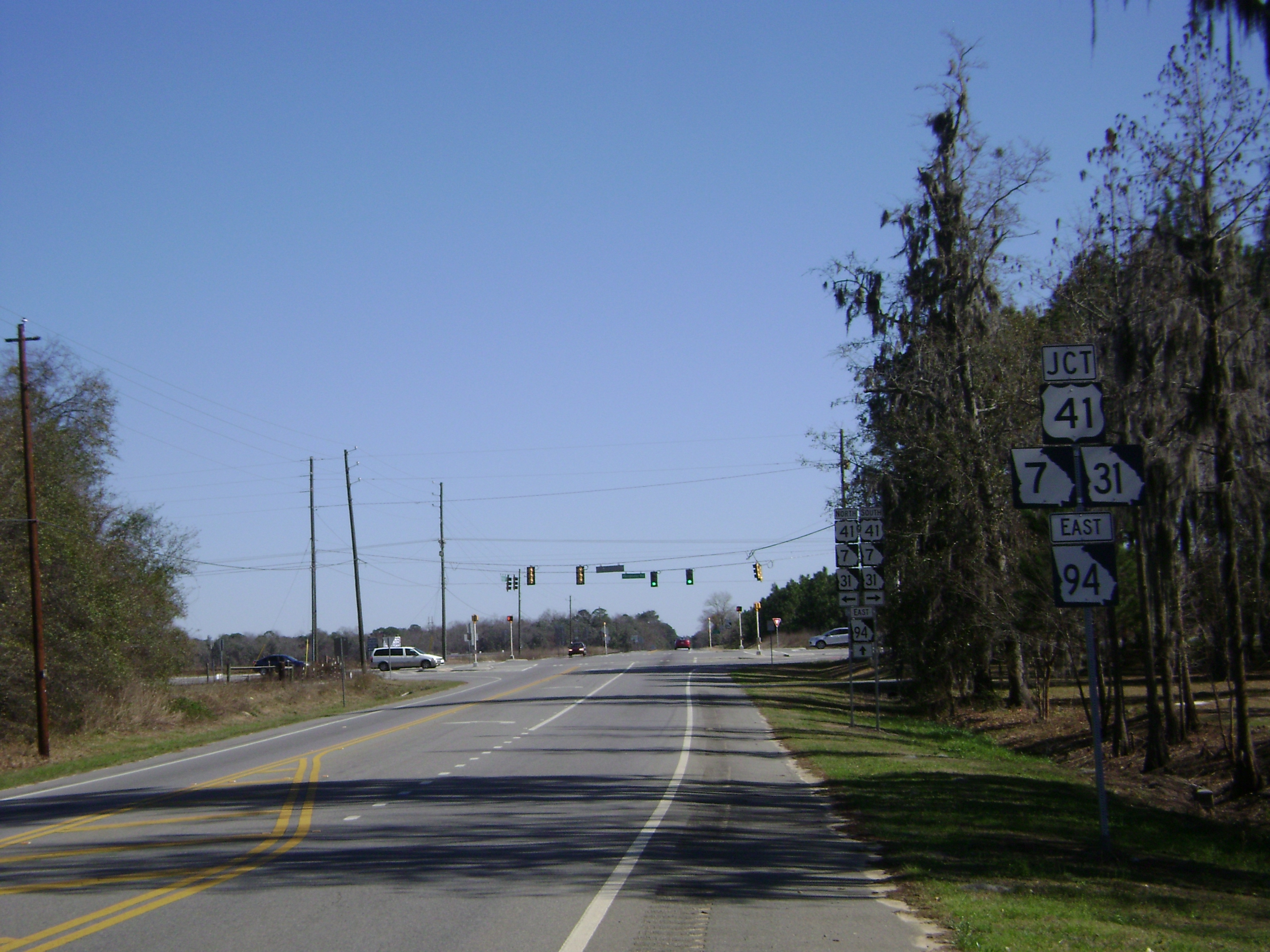
The Western terminus of SR 94 southeast of Valdosta

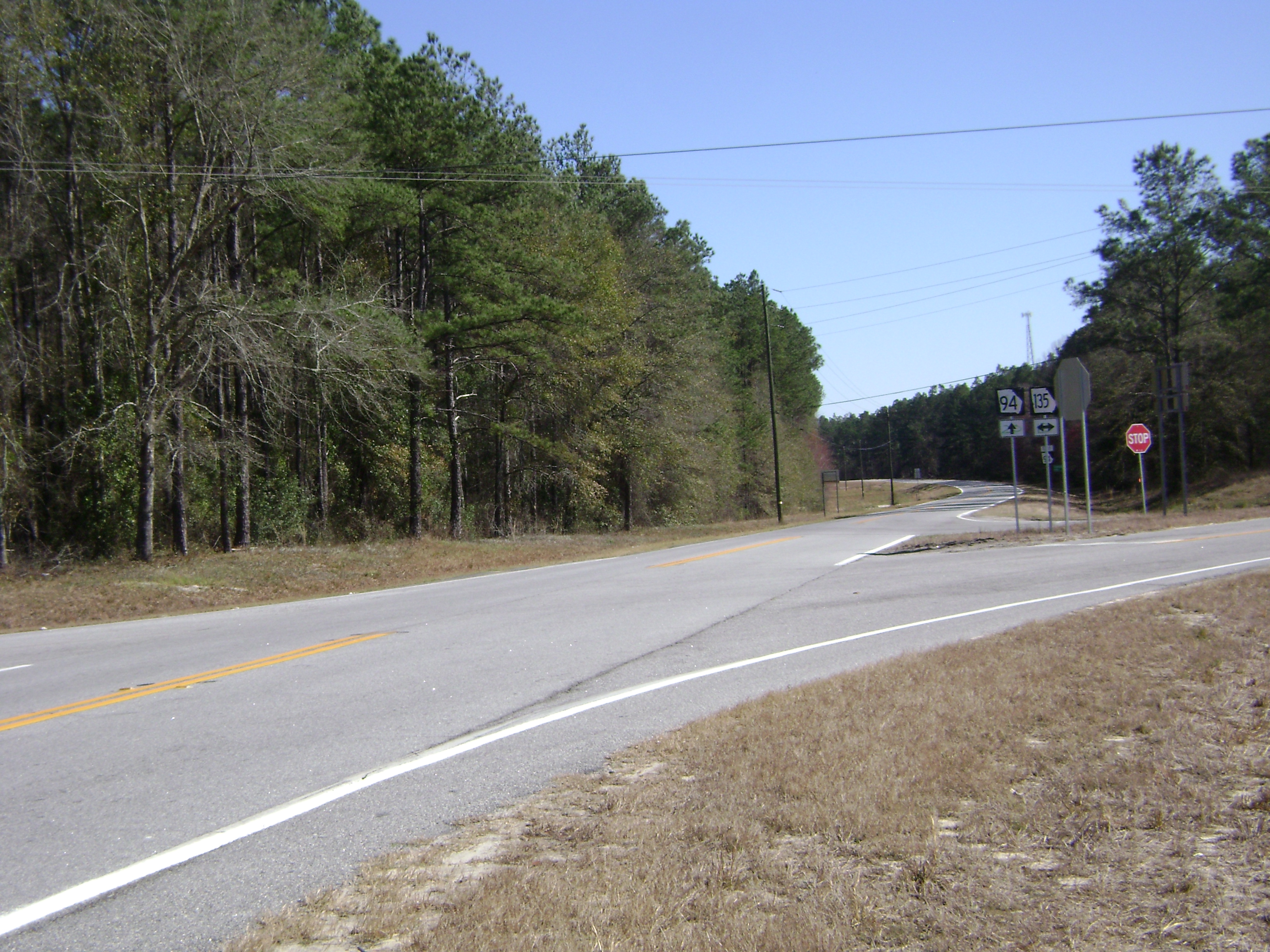
The intersection of SR 94 and SR 135 near Statenville

SR 94 begins at an intersection with US 41/SR 7/SR 31 (Inner Perimeter Road, which serves as a bypass of most of Valdosta) at a point southeast of downtown Valdosta, in the central part of Lowndes County. The highway travels to the east-southeast and crosses over Knights Creek. Upon crossing over Grand Bay Creek, it enters Echols County. The highway curves to the southeast and intersects SR 135. It curves back to the east-southeast and crosses over the Alapaha River on the western edge of Statenville. In Statenville, it curves to the east and meets US 129/SR 11. On the northwestern corner of the intersection of Walker Circle, it passes the U.S. Post Office for the community. Just west of an intersection with the western terminus of Wildcat Circle and the southern terminus of Anderson Street, it begins a curve back to the east-southeast. On the southeastern corner of this intersection is the headquarters of the Echols County School District. On the southeastern corner of the intersection with the eastern terminus of Wildcat Circle and the southern terminus of Church of God Street is the Echols County Community Park. Just to the east of this intersection is the Echols County Volunteer Fire Department. The highway leaves Statenville and curves to the east. Just to the east of an intersection with West Boundary Road, it curves back to the east-southeast. Just west of an intersection with the southern terminus of High Creek Road, it curves to the east-northeast. Just west of an intersection with the northern terminus of Barnes Road, it curves back to the east-southeast. A short distance after an intersection with the southern terminus of Will Rewis Road, it curves to the southeast. Just west of an intersection with the southern terminus of Harrison Ford Road, it curves to the south-southeast. It curves back to the east-southeast and then crosses over Toms Creek. It travels just south of Tiger Bay. After winding through rural areas, it curves to the east-northeast. The highway crosses over Wolf Bay Drain. It travels through Needmore. It travels just to the north of Pierce Camp Bay. It then crosses over Suwannoochee Creek on the PFC Don Manac Memorial Bridge into Clinch County. Immediately, it enters the city limits of Fargo. It begins a very gradual curve to the east-southeast. It then turns right onto US 441/SR 89. The three highways travel concurrently to the south. They pass the Suwannee River Visitor Center. Almost immediately, they curve to the southeast. They cross over the Suwannee River and then leave Fargo. A short distance later, US 441/SR 89 splits off to the south-southeast just before an intersection with the southern terminus of SR 177 (Okefenokee Trail). This intersection is unique, in that drivers on SR 177 that want to head south on US 441/SR 89 have to turn east on SR 94 and immediately turn right onto US 441/SR 89. SR 94 continues to the southeast, curves to the south-southeast, and crosses over Cypress Creek. It curves to the east-southeast and cuts across the southwestern corner of the Okefenokee National Wildlife Refuge, and reaches the eastern terminus of its western segment, the Florida state line, where the roadway continues as State Road 2 (SR 2).

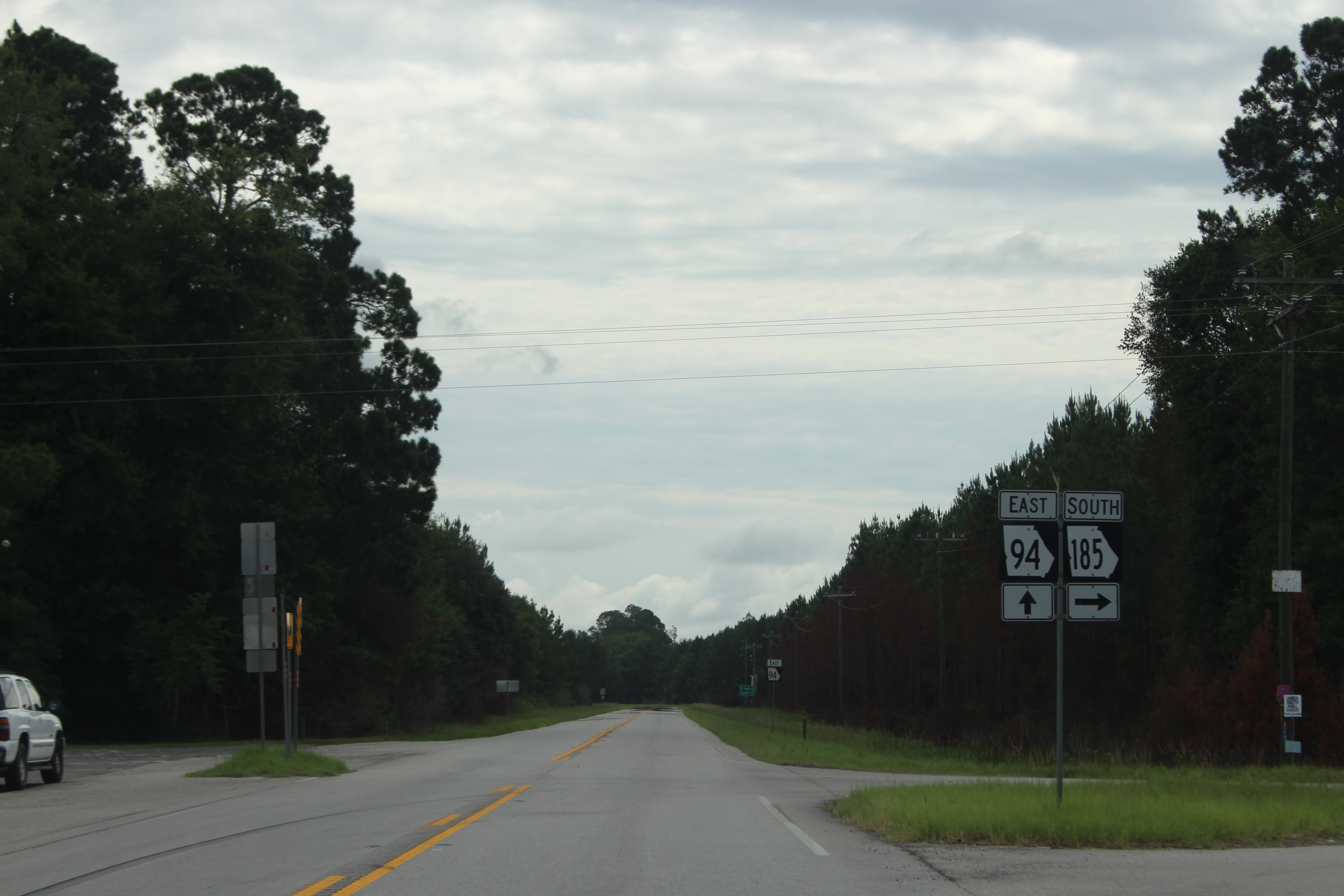
Eastbound view of SR 94 at the intersection with SR 185 in Moniac

=== Eastern segment ===
The route resumes at the spot where SR 2 meets the Georgia state line, west of Moniac, on the southeastern edge of the Okefenokee National Wildlife Refuge, at a crossing over the St. Marys River within Charlton County. The highway travels to the east-northeast and immediately enters Moniac. There, it intersects the northern terminus of SR 185. The highway curves to the east-southeast and travels just north of Roberts Bay. It winds through rural areas of the county and crosses over River Styx. It continues generally to the east until just before it enters St. George. On the southwestern corner of an intersection with the northern terminus of Cherokee Way is the Charlton County – St. George Recreation Department. The appropriately-named Cherokee Way leads to the Cherokees of Georgia Tribal Grounds. The highway then curves back to the east-northeast. In St. George, it intersects SR 23/SR 121. It continues to the east-northeast and leaves St. George just before it reaches its eastern terminus, a second instance with the Florida State line. Here, the roadway continues as County Road 2 (CR 2), over a second crossing of the St. Marys River.

== Major intersections ==
Mileage resets at the gap.

| County | Location | mi | km | Destinations | Notes |
|---|---|---|---|---|---|
| Lowndes | | 0.00 | 0.00 | US 41 / SR 7 / SR 31 (Perimeter Road) to I-75 | Western terminus; continues as New Statenville Road (former SR 94 west) |
| Grand Bay Creek | | | | Bridge | |
| Echols | | 12.5 | 20.1 | SR 135 – Jennings Fla, Howell, Naylor, Lakeland | |
| Echols | Statenville | 14.5 | 23.3 | US 129 (SR 11) – Jasper Fla., Lakeland | |
| Suwannoochee Creek | | 41.9– 42.0 | 67.4– 67.6 | PFC Don Manac Memorial Bridge | |
| Clinch | Fargo | 43.2 | 69.5 | US 441 north / SR 89 north – Homerville, Pearson | Western end of US 441/SR 89 concurrency |
| Clinch | | 44.0– 44.03 | 70.8– 70.86 | SR 177 north (Okefenokee Trail) / US 441 south / SR 89 south – Stephen C. Foster State Park, Okefenokee National Wildlife Refuge, Lake City | Eastern end of US 441/SR 89 concurrency; southern terminus of SR 177 (southern segment) |
| Clinch | | 52.3 | 84.2 | SR 2 east | Continuation into Florida |
FL 2 travels through Florida
| North Prong St. Marys River | | 0.00– 0.03 | 0.00– 0.048 | SR 2 west | Continuation into Florida |
| North Prong St. Marys River | | 0.00– 0.03 | 0.00– 0.048 | Florida–Georgia line | |
| Charlton | Moniac | 0.3 | 0.48 | SR 185 south – Macclenny | Northern terminus of SR 185 |
| Charlton | Saint George | 11.7 | 18.8 | SR 121 / SR 23 – Macclenny, Folkston, McKinney Community Health Center | |
| St. Marys River | | 12.9 | 20.8 | A.E. Bell Bridge; Georgia–Florida line | |
| St. Marys River | | 12.9 | 20.8 | CR 2 east – Crawford | Continuation into Florida |
1.000 mi = 1.609 km; 1.000 km = 0.621 mi: Concurrency terminus
