= Billys Lake =

Swamp in Georgia, United States

- Location in Georgia Billys Lake (the United States)
- Location: Charlton County, Georgia
- Coordinates: 30°50′03″N 82°21′37″W
- Type: Swamp
- Basin countries: United States
- Surface area: 60 acres (24 ha)
- Surface elevation: 115 ft (35 m)

Billys Lake is a swamp in the U.S. state of Georgia. It is located within the Okefenokee Swamp in Charlton County and is part of the Okefenokee National Wildlife Refuge.

Billys Lake covers approximately 60 acres (24 ha). It features waterways initially 100 to 150 feet (30 to 46 m) wide, narrowing to 35 feet (11 m) near its western end, with average depths ranging from 2 to 10 feet (0.61 to 3.05 m). Most of the 13-foot (4 m) drop in the swamp's surface elevation between east and west occurs between Billys Lake and Mixons Ferry.

The swamp is lined with cypress trees draped in Spanish moss, spatterdock, shining fetterbush, and holly.

Billys Lake was named after Billy Bowlegs (Holata Micco), a leader of the Seminoles who led a community in the swamp during the early 19th century.

The swamp has experienced significant droughts, drying up in 1860 and 1943. Water levels in Billys Lake are influenced by the Suwannee River Sill, a structure built to stabilize water during dry periods, affecting a 10,000–15,000-acre area.

== Ecology ==
Billys Lake features abundant vegetation such as Spanish moss, spatterdock, shining fetterbush (the principal understory species), and holly. The swamp supports a diverse wildlife population, with an estimated 10,000–13,000 American alligators in the surrounding area. It provides habitat for wildlife including large American alligators, herons, egrets, and barred owls.

== Access ==
Billys Lake is accessible by boat from Stephen C. Foster State Park, via a 1,700-foot (520 m) canal. The paddle across the swamp is approximately 2 miles (3.2 km) one way, part of marked trails in the refuge. It is an open area suitable for fishing and observing wildlife.
