= Georgia State Route 177 =

State highway in Georgia, United States

State Route 177
- Georgia State Route 177 highlighted in red

Route information
- Maintained by GDOT
- Length: 29.5 mi (47.5 km)

Southern section
- Length: 17.7 mi (28.5 km)
- South end: US 441 / SR 89 / SR 94 southeast of Fargo
- North end: Stephen C. Foster State Park

Northern section
- Length: 11.8 mi (19.0 km)
- South end: North entrance to Okefenokee Swamp Park south-southeast of Waycross
- Major intersections: US 1 / US 23 / SR 4 southeast of Waycross
- North end: US 82 / SR 520 north of Laura S. Walker State Park

Location
- Country: United States
- State: Georgia
- Counties: Clinch, Ware, Charlton, Brantley

Highway system
- Georgia State Highway System; Interstate; US; State; Special
← SR 176	→ SR 178

State Route 177 (SR 177) is a 29.5-mile (47.5 km) state highway in the southeastern part of the U.S. state of Georgia. It exists in two distinct sections, split by the Okefenokee National Wildlife Refuge, Okefenokee Swamp, and Okefenokee Wilderness, that travels south-to-north through portions of Clinch, Ware, Charlton, and Brantley counties.

== Route description ==
=== Southern segment ===
SR 177 begins at an intersection with US 441/SR 89/SR 94 just southeast of Fargo, in Clinch County. It heads northeast, through portions of Ware and Charlton counties. SR 177 enters the Okefenokee Swamp and then the Okefenokee National Wildlife Refuge. Farther to the northeast it enters Stephen C. Foster State Park and ends at a dead end in the northern end of the park.

=== Northern segment ===
The route resumes at the northern entrance of Okefenokee Swamp Park. It travels to the north and then to the northeast and has an intersection with US 1/US 23/SR 4 west of Laura S. Walker State Park, which is located southeast of Waycross, in Ware County. It travels along the southern edge of the park, and very briefly enters Brantley County. SR 177 re-enters Ware County, and enters the park. The highway heads to the north-northwest of US 82/SR 520, north of the park.

=== National Highway System ===
SR 177 is not part of the National Highway System, a system of roadways important to the nation's economy, defense, and mobility.

== Major intersections ==
County	Location	mi	km	Destinations	Notes
Clinch		0.0	0.0	US 441 / SR 89 / SR 94 – Lake City, Homerville	Southern terminus of southern segment
Ware	No major junctions				
Charlton	Stephen C. Foster State Park	17.7	28.5	Northern terminus of northern segment	
Gap in route
Ware	Okefenokee Swamp Park	0.0	0.0	Northern entrance	Southern terminus of northern segment
Ware		5.1	8.2	US 1 / US 23 / SR 4 (Jacksonville Highway) – Jacksonville, Waycross	
Brantley	No major junctions				
Ware		11.8	19.0	US 82 / SR 520 (Brunswick Highway) – Waycross, Brunswick	Northern terminus of northern segment
1.000 mi = 1.609 km; 1.000 km = 0.621 mi
