= Georgia State Route 185 =

Highway in Georgia

State Route 185
- SR 185 highlighted in red

Route information
- Maintained by GDOT
- Length: 12.90 mi (20.76 km)

Major junctions
- South end: SR 23 / SR 121 southwest of St. George
- North end: SR 94 in Moniac

Location
- Country: United States
- State: Georgia
- Counties: Charlton

Highway system
- Georgia State Highway System; Interstate; US; State; Special
← I-185	→ SR 186

State Route 185 (SR 185) is a 12.90-mile (20.76 km) state highway located in the southeastern part of the U.S. state of Georgia. It lies entirely within Charlton County.

== Route description ==
The highway begins at an intersection with SR 23/SR 121 at a point just north of the Florida state line (and near their southernmost point in the state). It heads northwest, skirting the nearby Florida state line to its west. County Road 120 (CR 120) is accessible via Reynolds Bridge Road. SR 185 continues to the northwest, through rural areas, until its northern end, an intersection with SR 94. Geographically, it is the second-southernmost state highway in the state, after SR 23/SR 121, which have their southern ends just a little further south than SR 185.

== Major intersections ==
The entire route is in Charlton County.

Location	mi	km	Destinations	Notes
	0.0	0.0	SR 23 / SR 121	Southern terminus
Moniac	13.0	20.9	SR 94 – St. George	Northern terminus
1.000 mi = 1.609 km; 1.000 km = 0.621 mi
