= Stephen Foster State Park =

Stephen Foster State Park may refer to:

- Stephen Foster Folk Culture Center State Park in White Springs, Florida
- Stephen C. Foster State Park in Georgia
