= Charlton County High School =

Public high school in Folkston, Georgia, United States

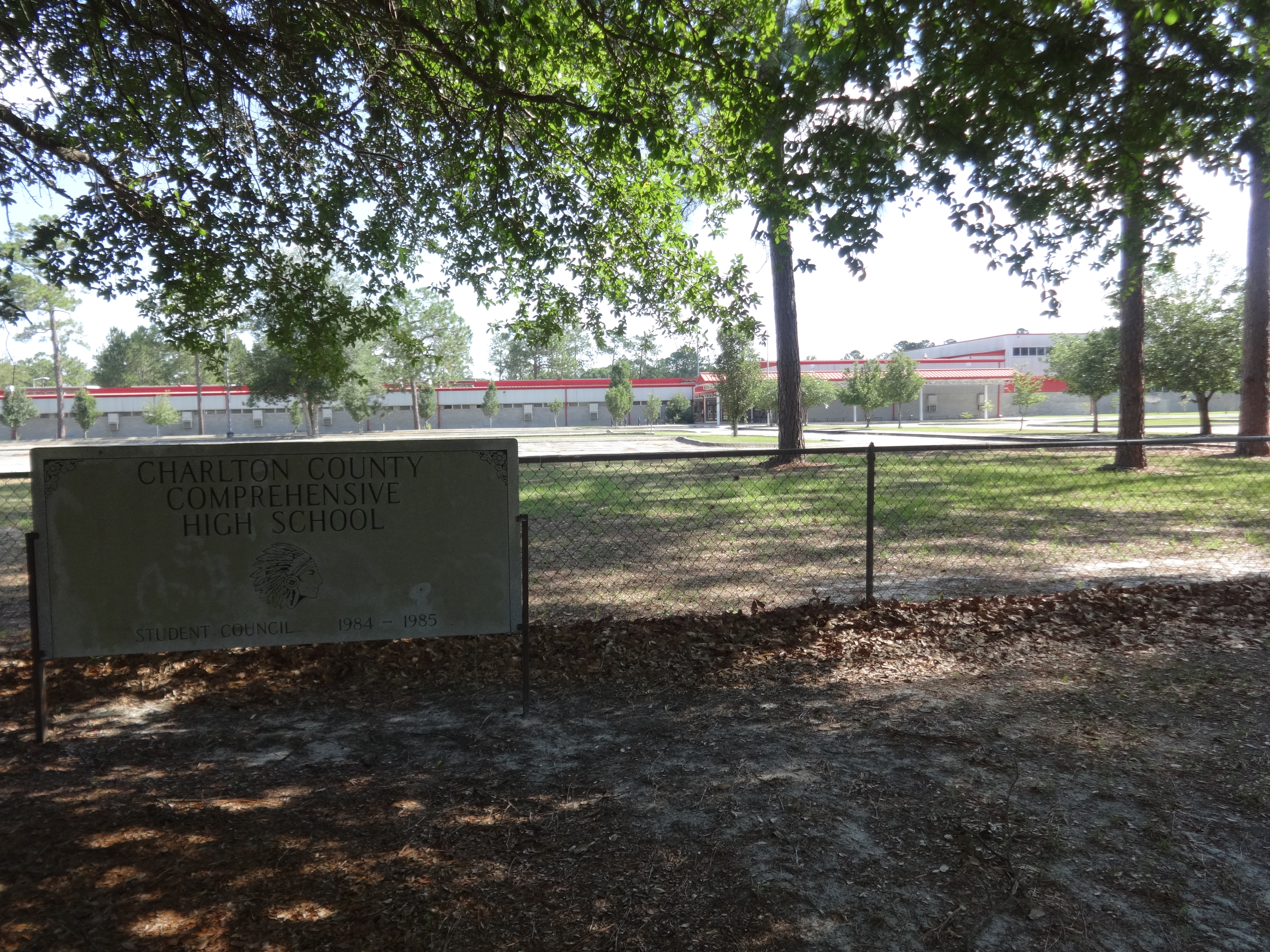
- Charlton County High School in 2015

Location
- 994 Indian Trail; Folkston, Georgia 31537-3122; United States; 30°50′44″N 82°00′07″W

Information
- School type: Public high school
- School district: Charlton County School District
- Superintendent: Kelly Murray
- CEEB code: 111300
- Principal: Tommy Harris
- Teaching staff: 31.50 (FTE)
- Grades: 9–12
- Gender: Co-education
- Enrollment: 417 (2024–2025)
- Student to teacher ratio: 13.24
- Colors: Black and red
- Sports: Baseball, basketball, cheerleading, cross-country, football, golf, softball, tennis, track and field, wrestling, Marching Band, Color guard, Dance line
- Mascot: Indians & Maidens
- Team name: Charlton County Indians & Maidens
- Rival: Clinch County High School
- Accreditation: Southern Association of Colleges and Schools
- Yearbook: Shilofohaw
- Website: charlton.k12.ga.us/o/cchs

Charlton County High School is a public high school located in Folkston, Georgia, United States. The school is part of the Charlton County School District, which serves Charlton County.

== Athletics ==
Charlton County has won four state championships in football (1999, 2004, 2005, and 2006).

It won its first state championship in Class A Baseball in 2013, and won a second in 2014. CCHS won its third state championship in Class 2A Division 2 in 2023.

Charlton County Indians won three state championships in track, in 1995, 2005, and 2006. Charlton County Maidens won their first State Championship in Track in 2024.

== Notable alumni ==
- Boss Bailey, former NFL linebacker
- Champ Bailey, former NFL cornerback
- Christopher Milton, NFL cornerback for the Indianapolis Colts
- David Pender, former NFL cornerback
- Courtney Williams, professional basketball player
