= Toledo, Georgia =

Unincorporated community in Georgia, US

Coordinates: 30°38′10″N 82°03′09″W

Toledo is an unincorporated community in Charlton County, in the U.S. state of Georgia. It is located along the vicinity of Georgia State Routes 121 and 23 north of Saint George, Georgia.

== History ==
A post office called Toledo was established in 1895, and remained in operation until 1930. The community's name is a transfer from Toledo, Spain but is pronounced "Ta-lee'-dough".
