= Fargo, Georgia =

- City
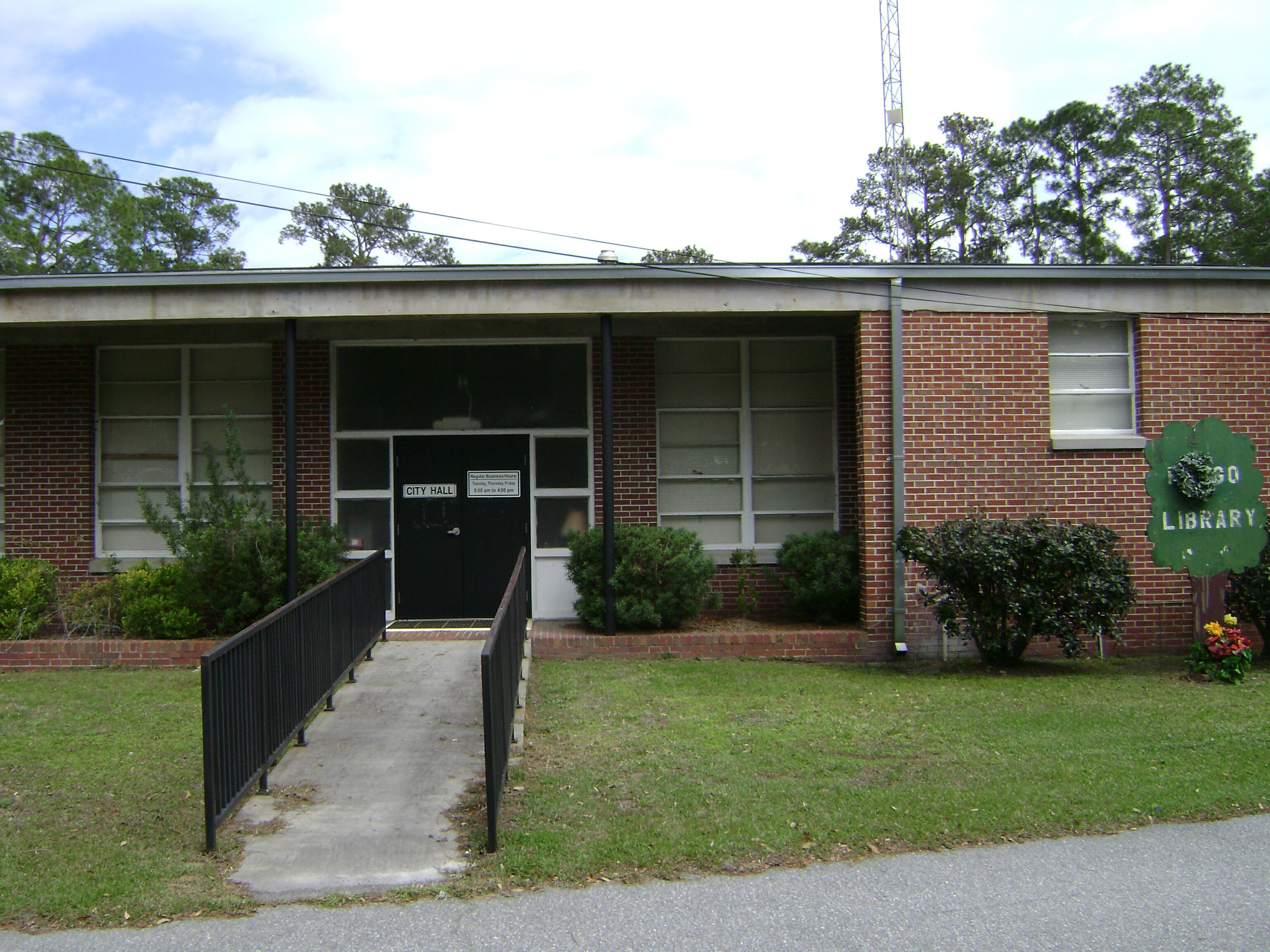
- Fargo City Hall

- Location in Clinch County and the state of Georgia
- Coordinates: 30°41′12″N 82°34′1″W
- Country: United States
- State: Georgia
- County: Clinch

Area
  - Total: 2.76 sq mi (7.14 km^{2})
  - Land: 2.75 sq mi (7.11 km^{2})
  - Water: 0.012 sq mi (0.03 km^{2})
- Elevation: 112 ft (34 m)

Population (2020)
  - Total: 250
  - Density: 91.1/sq mi (35.18/km^{2})
- Time zone: UTC-5 (Eastern (EST))
  - Summer (DST): UTC-4 (EDT)
- ZIP code: 31631
- Area code: 912
- FIPS code: 13-28744
- GNIS feature ID: 0314079

Fargo is a city in Clinch County, Georgia, United States. As of the 2020 census, the city had a population of 250. Formerly a town, it was incorporated by the Georgia state legislature in 1992, effective from April 1.

Fargo is one of the most remote cities in Georgia, with the only settlement in almost 20 miles being Williamsburg.

Fargo is located near the Okefenokee Swamp and is the western gateway to the Okefenokee National Wildlife Refuge. Also nearby is Okefenokee State Park.

The Bugaboo Fire threatened the city in April and May 2007.

== Geography ==
Fargo is located in southern Clinch County at 30°41′12″N 82°34′1″W (30.686698, −82.567076). Its western border is formed by Suwannoochee Creek, also the Echols County line. The Suwannee River forms the eastern border of the city.

U.S. Route 441 passes through the city's eastern side, leading north 28 miles (45 km) to Homerville, Georgia, and south 39 miles (63 km) to Lake City, Florida. Georgia State Route 177 leads northeast 17 miles (27 km) to its end in the Okefenokee Swamp at Stephen C. Foster State Park.

According to the United States Census Bureau, Fargo has a total area of 2.7 square miles (7.1 km^{2}), of which 0.01 square miles (0.03 km^{2}), or 0.46%, is water.

== Demographics ==
Historical population
Census	Pop.	Note	%±
2000	380		—
2010	321		−15.5%
2020	250		−22.1%
U.S. Decennial Census; 1850-1870 1870-1880; 1890-1910 1920-1930; 1940 1950 1960; 1970 1980 1990; 2000 2010

Fargo racial composition as of 2020
Race	Num.	Perc.
White (non-Hispanic)	208	83.2%
Black or African American (non-Hispanic)	31	12.4%
Native American	4	1.6%
Other/Mixed	4	1.6%
Hispanic or Latino	3	1.2%

As of the 2020 United States census, there were 250 people, 89 households, and 59 families residing in the city.
