= Saint George, Georgia =

Unincorporated community in Georgia, U.S.

Coordinates: 30°31′16″N 82°02′15″W

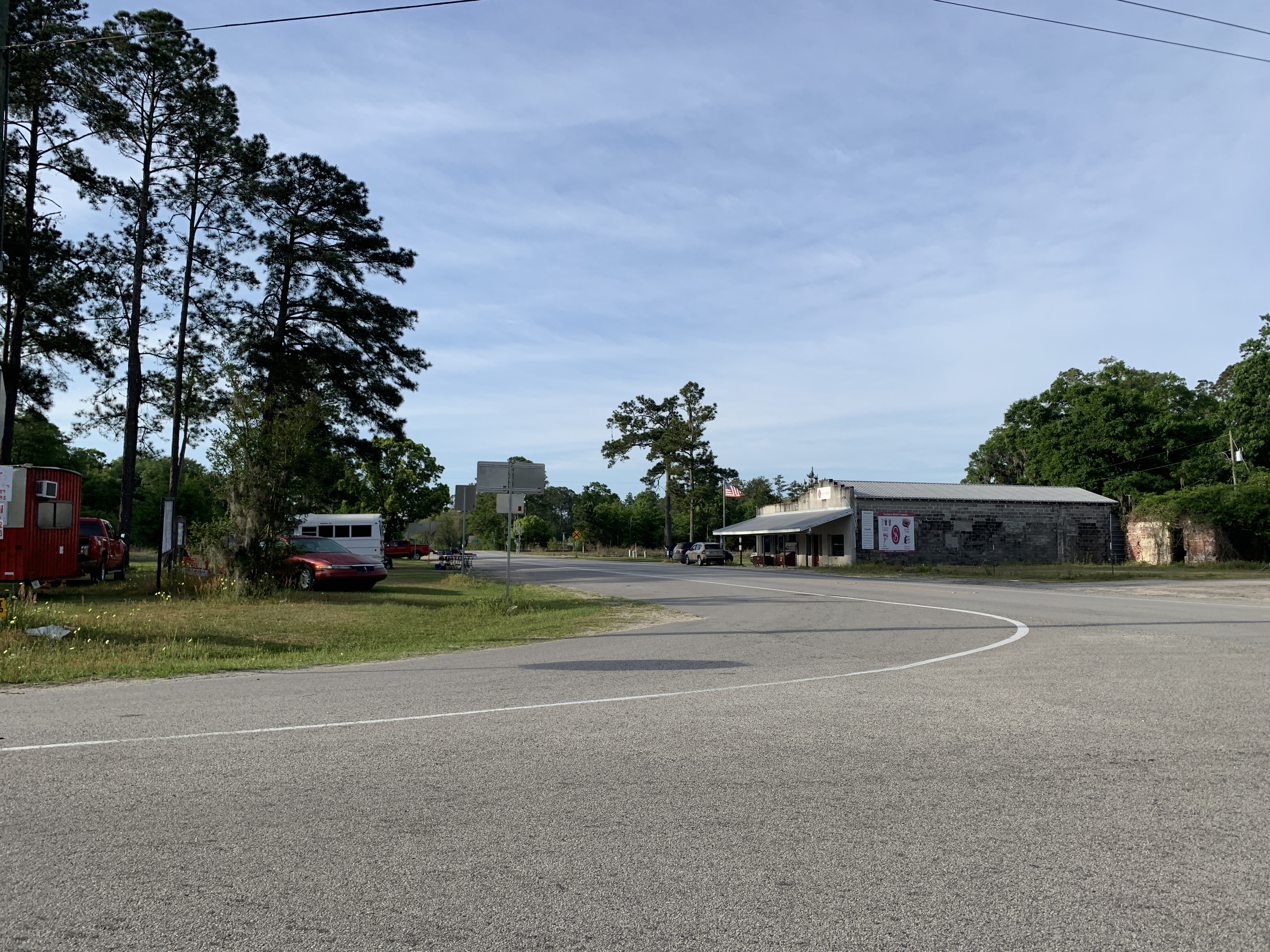
Saint George Post Office Building on GA 121-23 as seen from GA 94 in Saint George, Georgia

Saint George, an unincorporated community located in the "Georgia Bend" of the St. Mary's River, is the southernmost named settlement in Georgia. It is in Charlton County, south of Folkston. In 2020, the population of the St. George census county division (CCD) was 2,237. Most of this population is in the town of St. George, but the figure also includes rural areas not recognized by the Census Bureau, including communities like Moniac. The ZIP Code for Saint George is 31562.

== History ==
The Georgia General Assembly incorporated Saint George as a town in 1906. The town's municipal charter was repealed in 1924.

== Education ==
Students from St. George and the surrounding rural areas attend St. George Elementary School of the Charlton County School District. It serves students in grades Pre-Kindergarten through sixth. After sixth grade, students are taught at Bethune Middle School and Charlton County High School in Folkston.

== Transportation ==
The main roads through Saint George are Georgia State Route 94 which runs west to east through the Georgia Bend from two separate bridges of the Saint Mary's River, and Georgia State Routes 121 and 23 which run south to north from a bridge over the Saint Mary's River through Folkston, then branch off separately while being overlapped by US 1-23 and 301 in Homeland.

The sole railroad line through Saint George is the Norfolk Southern Railway's Valdosta District, which runs parallel to GA 94 and has been running through the community since 1899.
