= St. Marys River (Florida–Georgia) =

River in Florida and Georgia, United States

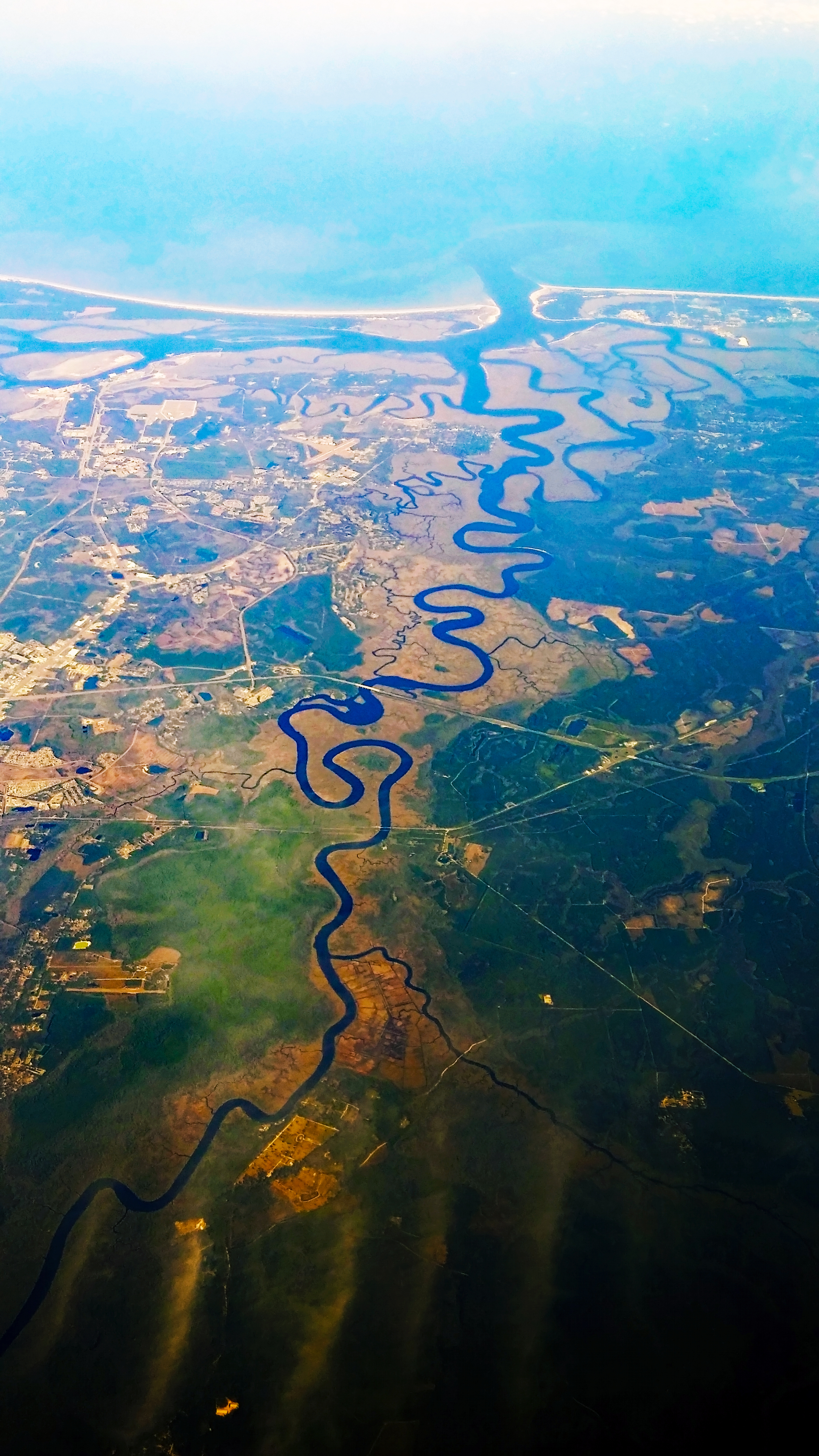
- Aerial photo of St. Marys River dividing border of Georgia (left) and Florida (right) from 26,000 feet altitude

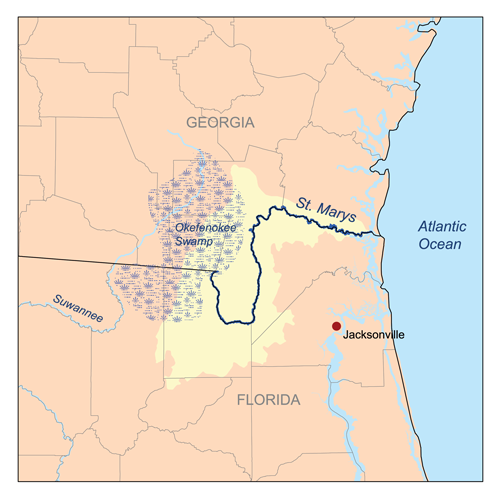
- St. Marys River watershed

- Location of mouth

Location
- Country: United States
- State: Florida, Georgia

Physical characteristics
- Mouth: Atlantic Ocean
  - coordinates: 30°43′23″N 81°29′41″W
- Length: 236 mi (380 km)

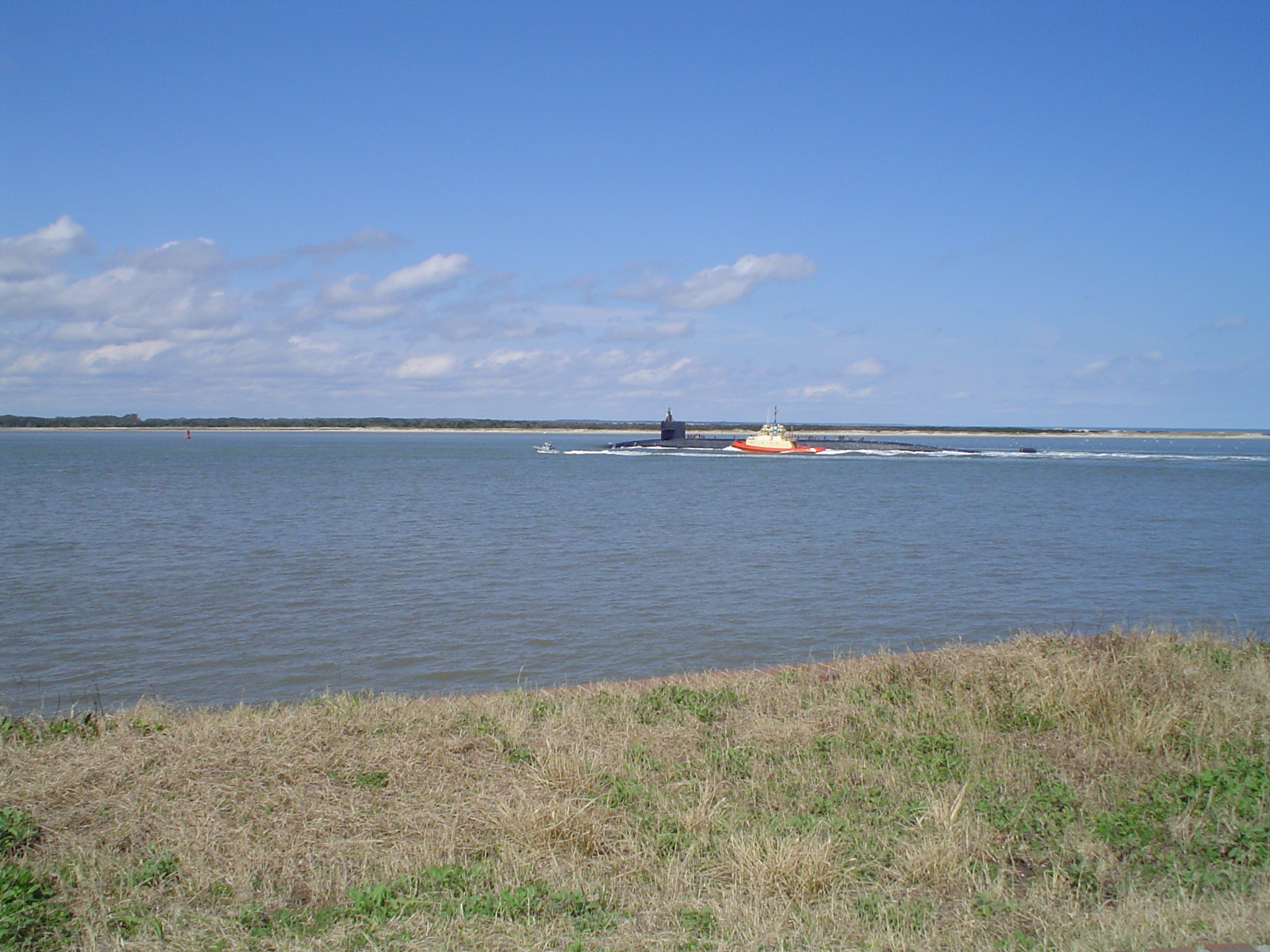
St. Marys River seen from Fort Clinch, Florida, with nuclear submarine returning to the sub base at Kings Bay, Georgia

The St. Marys River (named Saint Marys River by the United States Geological Survey,) is a 126-mile-long (203 km) river in the southeastern United States. The river was known to the Timucua as Thlathlothlaguphka, or Phlaphlagaphgaw, meaning "rotten fish". French explorer Jean Ribault named the river the Seine when he encountered it in 1562. From near its source in the Okefenokee Swamp, to its mouth at the Atlantic Ocean, it forms a portion of the border between the U.S. states of Georgia and Florida. Part of the river runs along the southernmost point in the state of Georgia.

The St. Marys River rises as a tiny stream flowing from the western edge of Trail Ridge, the geological relic of a barrier island/dune system, and into the southeastern Okefenokee Swamp. Arching to the northwest, it loses its channel within the swamp, then turns back to the southwest and reforms a stream, at which point it becomes the St. Marys River. Joined by another stream, Moccasin Creek, the river emerges from the Okefenokee Swamp at Baxter, Florida/Moniac, Georgia. It then flows south, then east, then north, then east-southeast intersecting I-95 near Yulee, and finally emptying its waters into the Atlantic, near St. Marys, Georgia and Fernandina Beach, Florida.

== Name ==
The U.S. Board on Geographic Names discourages the use of apostrophes in place names, including St. Marys River.

== 1805 incident ==
On 6 July 1805, Lieutenant Robert Pigot of HMS Cambrian arrived off the harbour in the French privateer schooner Matilda, which the British had captured three days earlier. On 7 July Pigot took Matilda twelve miles (nineteen kilometres) up the St Marys River to attack three vessels reported to be there. Along the way militia and riflemen fired on Matilda. Eventually the British reached the three vessels, which were lashed in a line across the river. They consisted of a Spanish privateer schooner and her two British prizes, the ship Golden Grove and the brig Ceres, which the Spanish privateer had captured some two months earlier. The Spaniards had armed Golden Grove with eight 6-pounder guns and six swivels, and given her a crew of 50 men. The brig too was armed with swivels and small arms. The Spanish schooner carried six guns and a crew of 70 men.

Pigot engaged the vessels for an hour, and then after Matilda had grounded, took his crew in her boats and captured Golden Grove. The British then captured the other two vessels. Lastly, Pigot fired on a group of 100 militia, with a field gun, dispersing them. The British had two men killed, and 14 wounded, including Pigot, who had received two bullet wounds to the head and one to a leg. A crowd of Americans on the Georgia side of the river watched the entire battle.

== War of 1812 ==
See Battle of Fort Peter

== Literature ==
Martin, Charles. Where the River Ends. New York, Broadway Books, 2008. ISBN 9780767926980. An artist and his dying wife fulfill her wish of one last canoe ride from the headwaters of the St. Marys to the sea.

== List of crossings ==
Crossing	Carries	Image	Location	Coordinates
Headwaters (Okefenokee National Wildlife Refuge)				
	SR 2 / SR 94		Baxter-Moniac	
NS Rail Bridge	Valdosta District		Baxter-Moniac	
	Reynolds Bridge Road (Abandoned)		Culyer-Moniac	
	SR 121 / US 90 / SR 121 / SR 23		Baker County-Charlton County	
Confluence with South Prong of the St. Mary's River			Baker County-Charlton County	
NS Rail Bridge	Valdosta District		Saint George-Kent	
A.E. Bell Bridge	SR 94 CR 2		Saint George-Kent	
Tracy's Ferry (Abandoned)	Tracy's Ferry Road-Tracey Road		Trader's Hill-Boulogne	
CSX Rail Bridge	Nahunta Subdivision		Boulogne-Folkston	
	US 1 / US 23 / US 301 / SR 15 / SR 4 / SR 15		Boulogne-Folkston	
Confluence with Little St. Mary's River			Gross-Kingsland	
	First Coast Railroad Seals Division (formerly CSX Kingsland Subdivision)		Gross-Kingsland	
Blue Bridge	US 17 / SR 5 / SR 25		Gross-Kingsland	
	I-95 / SR 9 / SR 405		Gross-Kingsland	
confluence with Bells River			Fernandina Beach-St. Mary's	
confluence with Jolly River (south) and Cumberland River (north)			Fernandina Beach-St. Mary's	
confluence with Amelia River			Fernandina Beach-St. Mary's	
Mouth (Atlantic Ocean)				

== See also ==
- List of rivers of Florida
- List of rivers of Georgia (U.S. state)
- List of rivers of the Americas by coastline
- South Atlantic-Gulf Water Resource Region
