= Christopher Milton =

American football player (born 1992)

No. 40, 28, 30, 35
- Position: Cornerback

Personal information
- Born: September 15, 1992 (age 34); Folkston, Georgia, U.S.
- Listed height: 5 ft 11 in (1.80 m)
- Listed weight: 190 lb (86 kg)

Career information
- High school: Charlton County (Folkston, Georgia)
- College: Georgia Tech
- NFL draft: 2016: undrafted

Career history
- Indianapolis Colts (2016–2018); Tennessee Titans (2019–2020); New York Giants (2021)*; Miami Dolphins (2021)
- * Offseason or practice squad member only

Career NFL statistics
- Total tackles: 36
- Pass deflections: 2
- Fumble recoveries: 2
- Stats at Pro Football Reference

Christopher Devon Milton (born September 15, 1992) is an American former professional football player who was a cornerback in the National Football League (NFL). He played college football for the Georgia Tech Yellow Jackets. He was a member of the Indianapolis Colts, Tennessee Titans, New York Giants and Miami Dolphins.

== College career ==
Milton played in 53 games with 33 starts at Georgia Tech, collecting 96 tackles, three tackles for loss, one forced fumble, 14 passes defensed and five interceptions.

== Professional career ==
=== Indianapolis Colts ===
Milton was signed by the Indianapolis Colts as an undrafted free agent on May 2, 2016. He was released on September 3, 2016, and was signed to the practice squad the next day. He was promoted to the active roster on November 19, 2016.

On March 12, 2019, Milton re-signed with the Colts. He was waived on September 1, 2019.

=== Tennessee Titans ===
On September 2, 2019, Milton was claimed off waivers by the Tennessee Titans. On November 26, 2019, Milton was placed on injured reserve.

On March 12, 2020, Milton was re-signed by the Titans. He was released during final roster cuts on September 5, 2020, but re-signed with the team the next day. On December 24, 2020, Milton was placed on injured reserve. Milton was released by the Titans on February 25, 2021.

=== New York Giants ===
On March 30, 2021, Milton was signed by the New York Giants. He was waived on August 17, 2021.

=== Miami Dolphins ===
On November 29, 2021, Milton was signed to the Miami Dolphins practice squad.
