= Trader's Hill, Georgia =

Ghost town

Coordinates: 30.780°N 82.029°W

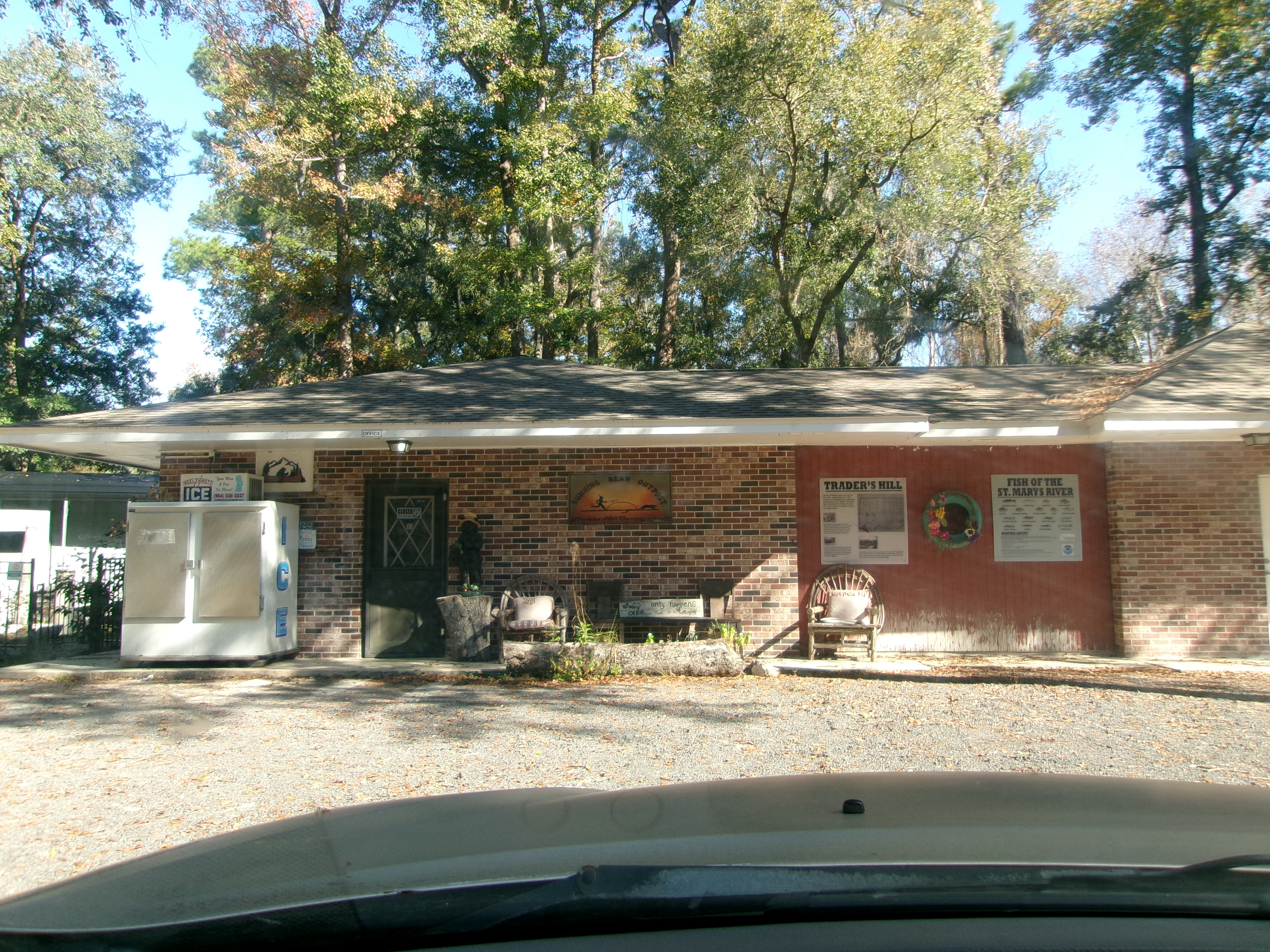
The Running Bear Outpost, the convenience store at the Trader's Hill Recreation Area and Campground.

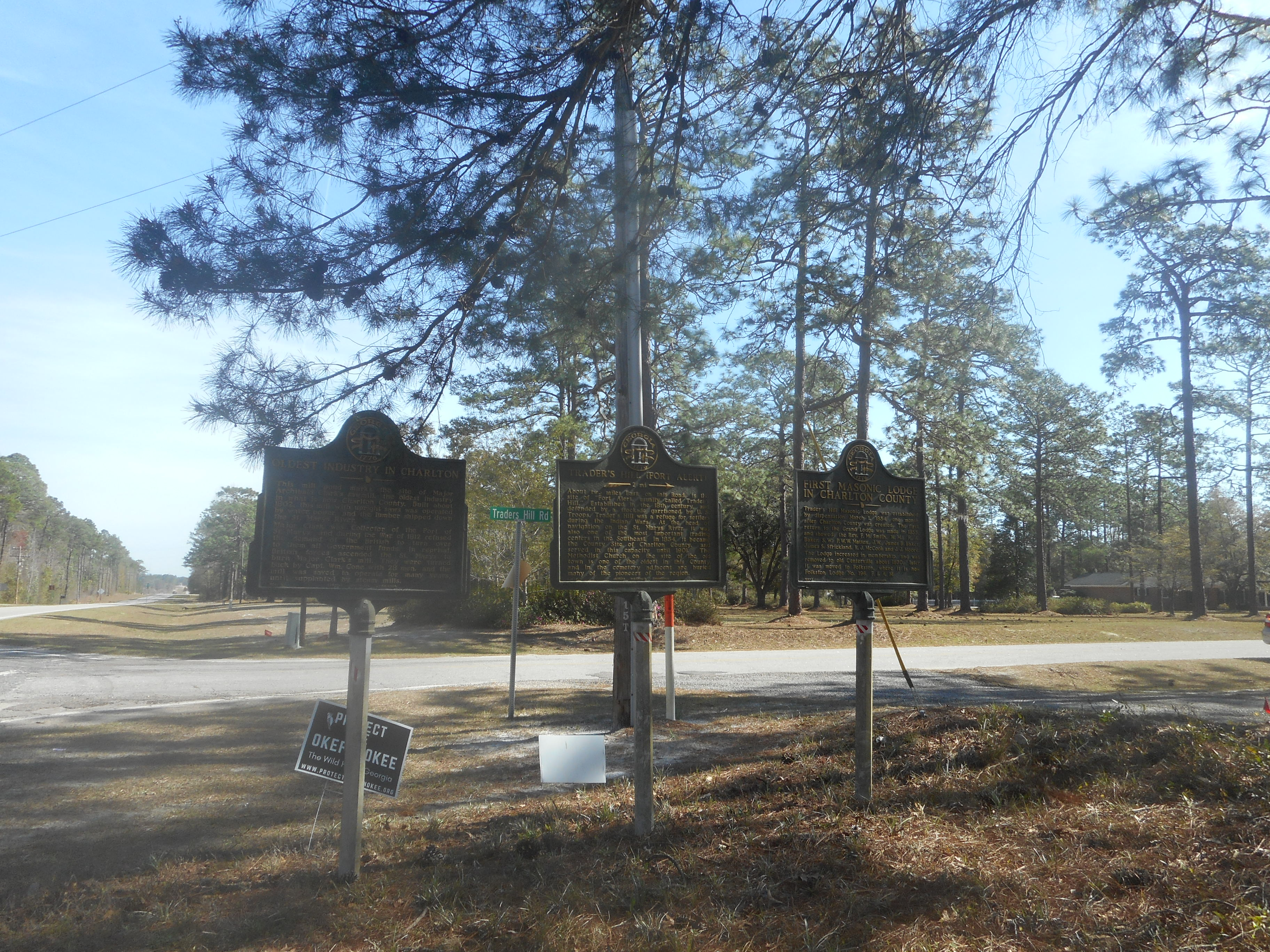
Three historic markers at the southeast corner of Georgia State Routes 121 and 23 and Trader's Hill Road.

Trader's Hill was a trading post and small settlement on the St. Marys River in Charlton County, Georgia.

== History ==
In 1793, Trader's Hill was the site of several murders by Creek Indians.

Fort Alert was constructed at Trader's Hill in 1812. After the War of 1812 ended, the fort was unmanned, but became active again from 1817 to 1819 during a time of heightened alarm mostly due to Creeks, but also due to the takeover of Fernandina by various rebel factions.

In 1854, Charlton County was created out of Camden County. Trader's Hill was selected as the first county seat. During the Civil War, Trader's Hill became a refugee site for local people, including residents of St. Marys, seeking to get away from the coast.

After the construction of the Savannah, Florida & Western Railway, the center of commerce in the area shifted from the river to the railway. In 1901, the county seat was moved to Folkston. Today, a group of Georgia Historical Markers two miles away from the site of old Trader's hill commemorates the commercial center. Trader's Hill itself is the site of a recreational vehicle campground and boat launching area.

== See also ==
- List of county seats in Georgia (U.S. state)
- List of ghost towns in Georgia (U.S. state)
