= Williamsburg, Clinch County, Georgia =

Unincorporated community in Georgia, U.S.

Coordinates: 30°46′58″N 82°30′45″W

Williamsburg is an unincorporated community in Clinch County, in the U.S. state of Georgia.

== History ==
It is unknown why the name "Williamsburg" was applied to this place.
