= Okefenokee Swamp Park =

Park in Waycross, Georgia, United States

Coordinates: 31.0568°N 82.2723°W

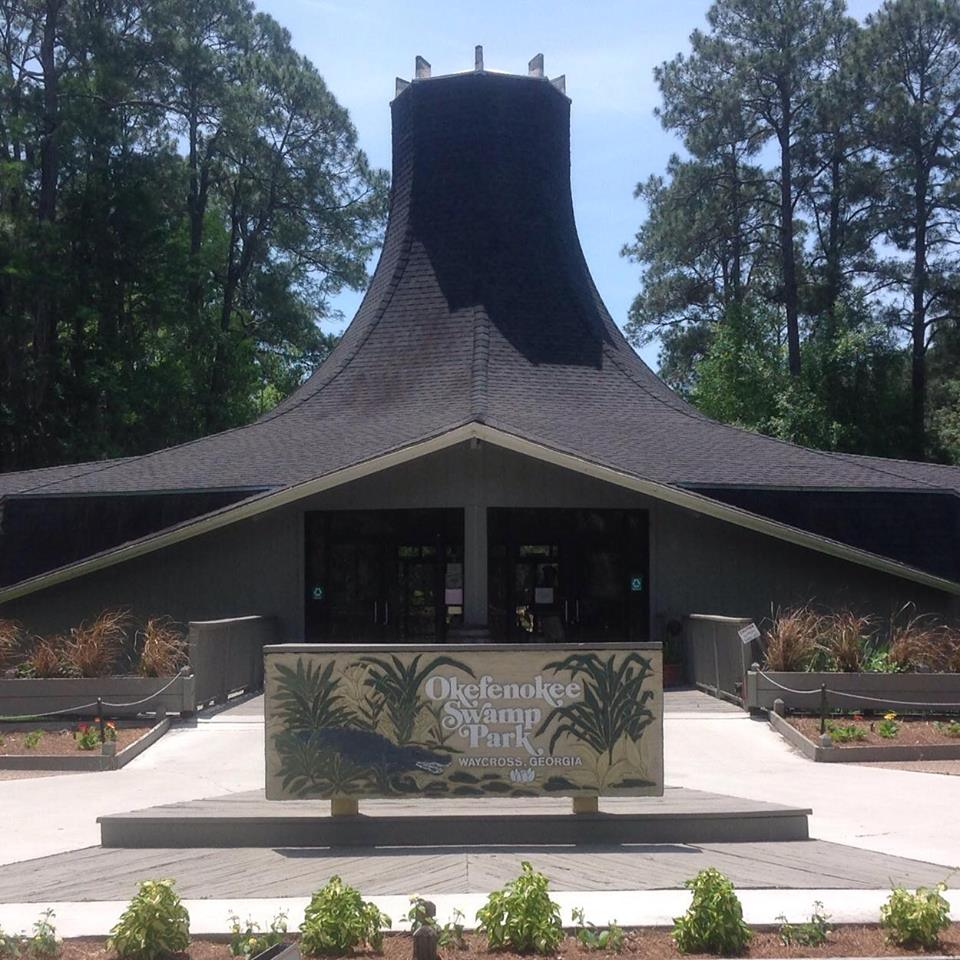
Okefenokee Swamp Park gift shop and ticket office

Okefenokee Swamp Park is located 12 miles south of Waycross, Georgia, United States. The park is accessed by taking the Vereen Bell Memorial Highway (Highway 177 South, Okefenokee Trail) to the southern side of the Cowhouse Island. This is the northernmost entry point to the Okefenokee National Wildlife Refuge. The Okefenokee Swamp is the most extensive blackwater swamp in North America and covers over 438,000 acres.

The Okefenokee Swamp Park is headquarters for its founding and administrative body, the Okefenokee Association, Inc., which was granted a sublease to Land Lot 20 in the Dixon Memorial Forest from the U.S. Department of Interior in 1945. The private nonprofit organization (501.c.3) has operated as a concession since 1946. In 1955, ownership of Georgia Coastal Flatwoods Upland Game Project property, including Waycross State Forest (Dixon Memorial State Forest), Laura S. Walker State Park and the Okefenokee Swamp Park, was transferred to the state of Georgia. The Association's current lease is with the Georgia Forestry Commission.

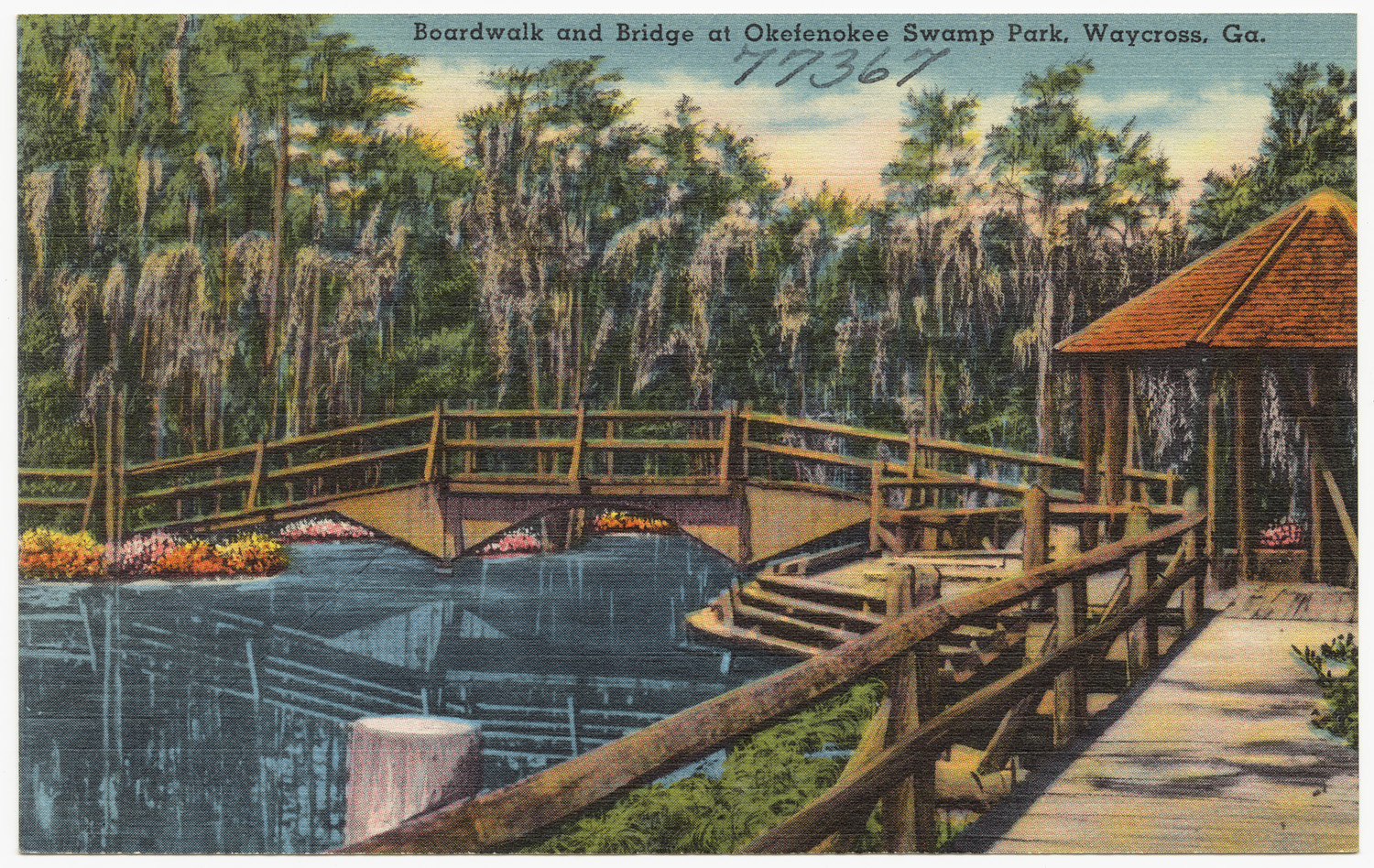
Boardwalk and bridge at Okefenokee Swamp Park, Waycross, Georgia

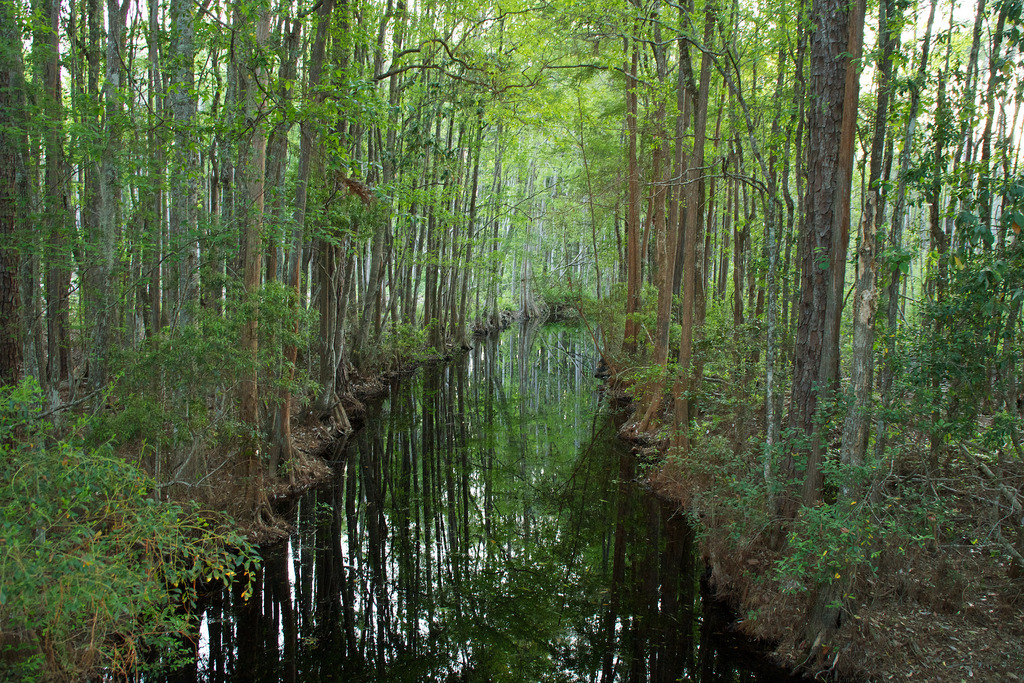
Tree canopy of Okefenokee Swamp

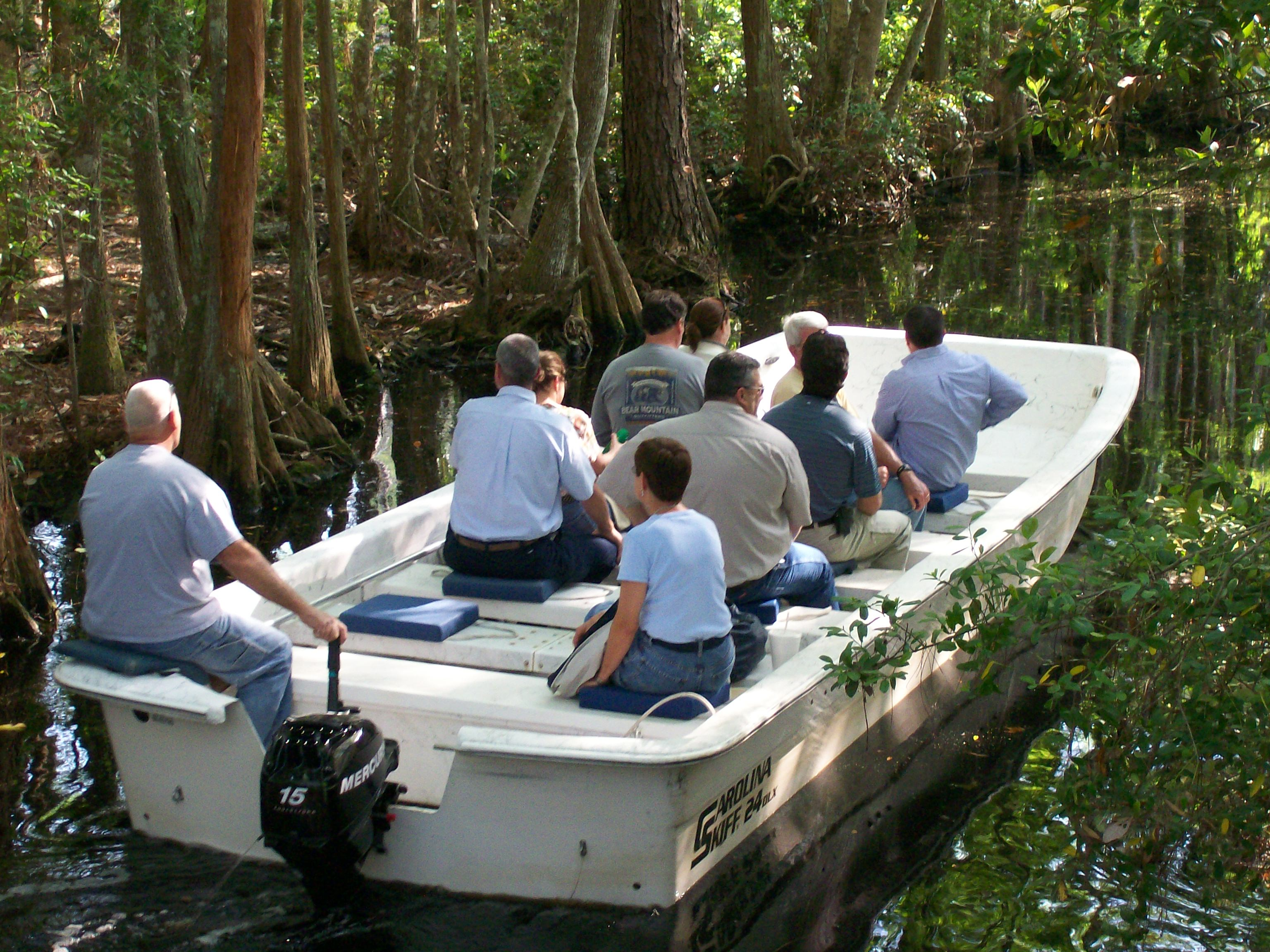
Boat tours aboard Carolina Skiff boats

"The park's mission is to promote ecological tourism and education by providing a convenient point of entry into the Okefenokee Swamp." Millions of visitors from all over the world have passed through the park's gates.

The Association utilized and improved access to already existing original Indian waterways; structures built by the Civilian Conservation Corp in 1937; a game corral built in 1938; and boardwalks built in 1940, leading to a 75-foot wooden observation tower. Skull Lake is within the park's 1200 acre property. Several million dollars’ worth of improvements are in the park.

The aerial view of the swamp was enhanced in 1965 by replacing the original tower with a 90-foot steel structure, making it the tallest observation point in the Okefenokee Swamp.

Visitors can experience the Okefenokee via boat tours, extensive nature boardwalks, wildlife (Eye on Nature) shows, live animal exhibits, and wildlife and cultural displays. Extensive renovations and the addition of structures occurred in the 1970s: new gift shop (1970); Pioneer Island (1971); new boat dock, Swamp Creation Building and Living Swamp Building (1972); Ole Roy & Swamp Creation exhibits (1973); Serpentarium/Nature Center (1974); and the Country Store (1975). The amphitheater stage and seating were added in 1981, and a Wetlands Exhibit in 1990. The only railroad system allowed to operate within the Okefenokee National Wildlife Refuge opened at the park in 1999, taking visitors on a 1.5-mile journey through the swamp. Its presence is reminiscent of a time during the late 19th and early 20th centuries when the voices of track layers, loggers and turpentine workers could be heard working to harvest the Okefenokee's resources for local and world markets.

A point of interest on the rail route is a stop at Pioneer Island. Featured is a recreated swamp homestead centered around an authentic swamp residence, the Highsmith Cabin, with essential outbuildings. The Country Store/Museum showcases photos and a bounty of artifacts chronicling some of the major events occurring in the Okefenokee Swamp and the Okefenokee Swamp Park. A replica of the Wildes Cabin on Pioneer Island is now a memorial to Maximillian Wildes and those who died with him at the hands of Seminole warriors in the 1838 Wildes Massacre. The structure was dedicated in 1988, marking the 150th anniversary of the last Indian massacre in the state of Georgia.

Oscar the alligator made his home at the Okefenokee Swamp Park until his death in 2007. His reconstructed skeleton is on display in the gift shop.

An admission charge goes towards operating and developing the park, as do donations of time and money by the members of the Osprey Society.

While overnight camping on the property is not allowed, nearby Laura S. Walker State Park has camping accommodations.
