= Needmore, Echols County, Georgia =

Unincorporated community in Georgia, U.S.

Coordinates: 30°40′45″N 82°42′41″W

Needmore is an unincorporated community in Echols County, in the U.S. state of Georgia.

== History ==
According to tradition, the community was so named because its country store "needed more" of everything.
