= Charlton County Courthouse =

- U.S. National Register of Historic Places
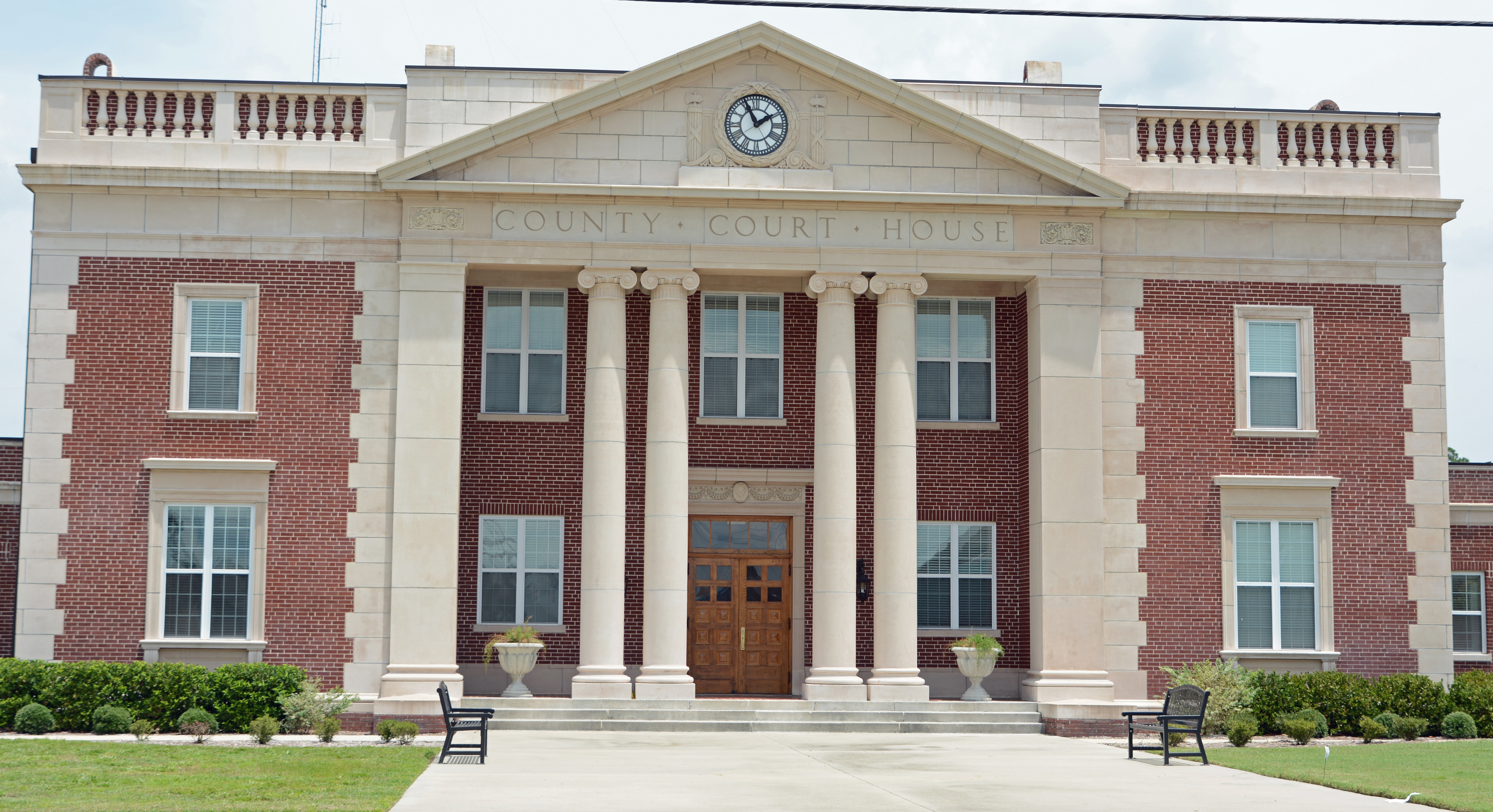
- The courthouse in 2015

- Location within Georgia Location within the United States
- Location: Off GA 40, Folkston, Georgia
- Coordinates: 30.83189°N 82.00486°W
- Area: 1 acre (0.40 ha)
- Built: 1928
- Built by: Basil P. Kennard
- Architect: Benjamin (further name not given)
- Architectural style: Classical Revival
- MPS: Georgia County Courthouses TR
- NRHP reference No.: 80000987
- Added to NRHP: September 18, 1980

The Charlton County Courthouse is located in Folkston, Georgia. It is in the Neoclassical style and was constructed in 1928 out of brick, stone, and concrete. The construction cost was $46,000 and the clock cost and additional $3,000. The total cost of the project was $54,000. It is the fourth courthouse built for this county and is built on the site of the previous courthouse, which was built in 1902 and burned in 1928.

The building was added to the National Register of Historic Places in 1980.
