= Moniac, Georgia =

Unincorporated community in Georgia, U.S.

Coordinates: 30°31′06″N 82°13′30″W

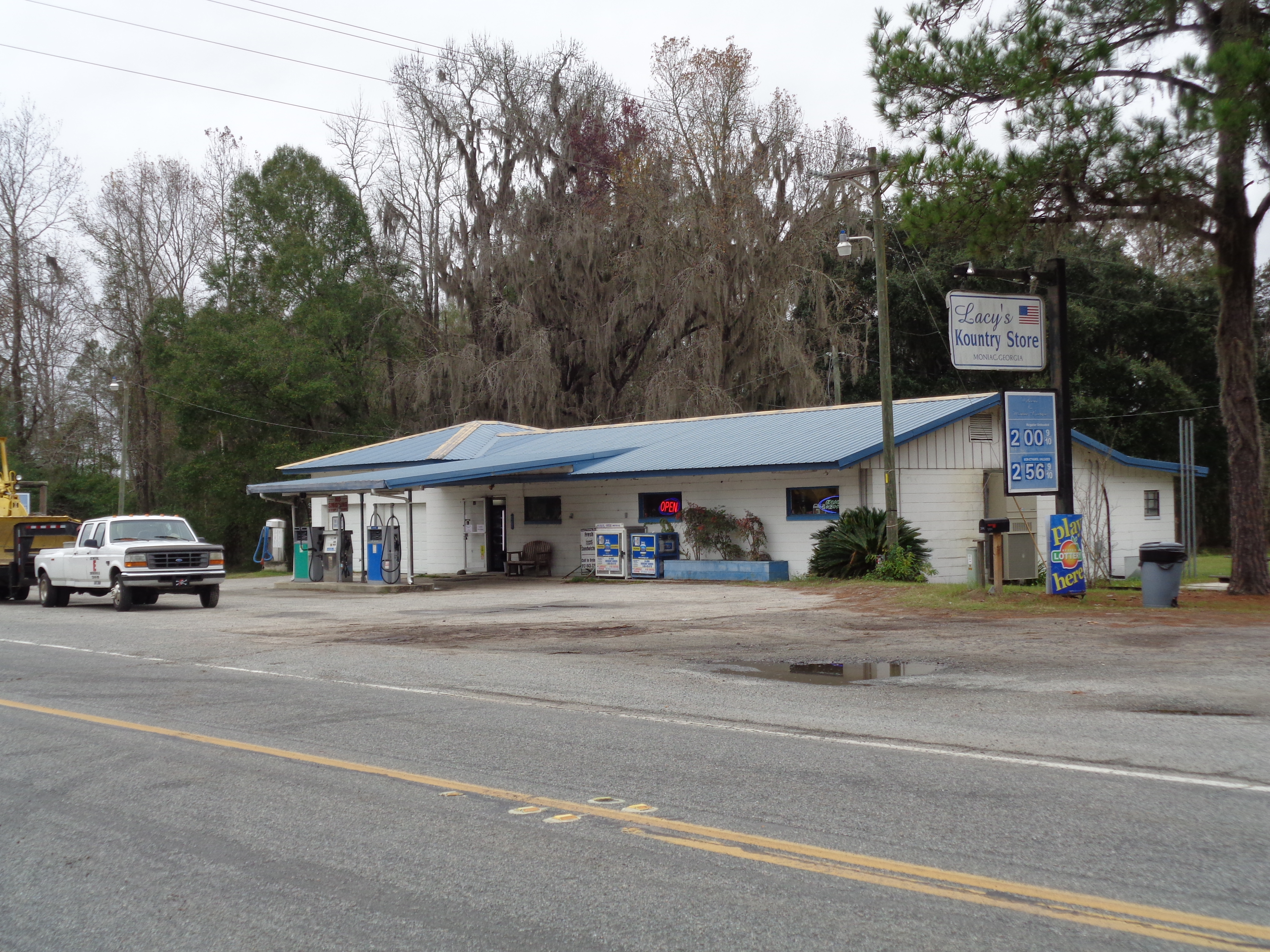
Lacy's County Store in Moniac on Georgia State Route 94 across from GA 185, 2016

Moniac is an unincorporated community situated along the St. Marys River, in southern Charlton County in the U.S. state of Georgia. Part of the "Georgia Bend" (the "tail" of Georgia that protrudes farther south than the rest of the state), the area was an early trading post in the 1820s as the last outpost before crossing into the Florida territory. The settlement's name comes from Colonel David Moniac, a Creek Indian and West Point graduate who was killed during the second Seminole Indian War. The fort was dismantled in 1842.

== Fort Moniac ==
To protect the settlement from Indian raids, a fort named Fort Moniac was built across the St. Marys from the settlement in 1838.

== Geography ==
Located near the Okefenokee Swamp, the area was evacuated in May 2007 during the Bugaboo Fire.
