= Homeland, Georgia =

City in Georgia, United States

- City
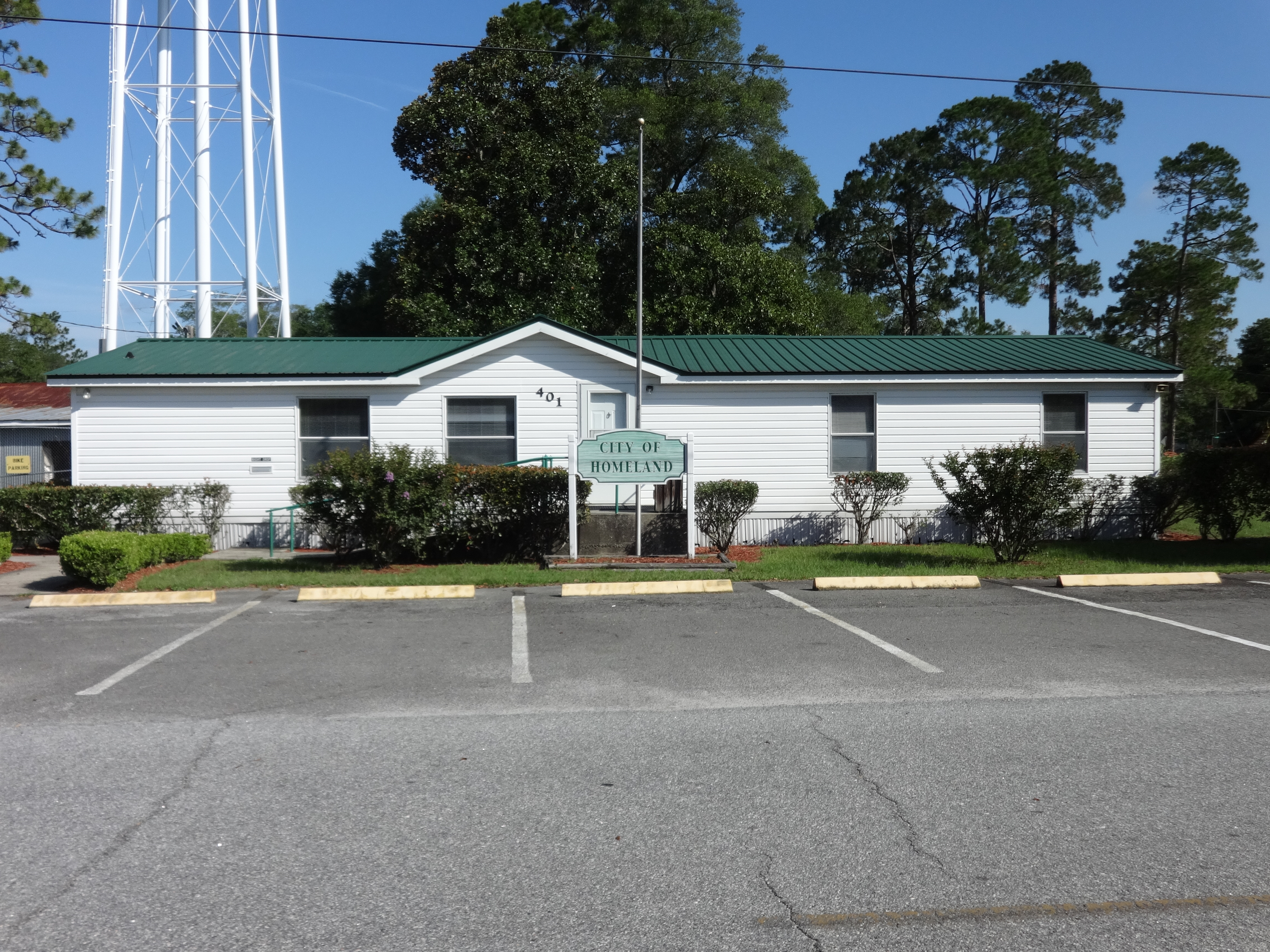
- Homeland City Hall

- Logo

- Location in Charlton County and the state of Georgia
- Coordinates: 30°51′34″N 82°1′19″W
- Country: United States
- State: Georgia
- County: Charlton

Government
  - Mayor: LC Guinn

Area
  - Total: 2.50 sq mi (6.47 km^{2})
  - Land: 2.50 sq mi (6.47 km^{2})
  - Water: 0 sq mi (0.00 km^{2})
- Elevation: 95 ft (29 m)

Population (2020)
  - Total: 886
  - Density: 354.5/sq mi (136.88/km^{2})
- Time zone: UTC-5 (Eastern (EST))
  - Summer (DST): UTC-4 (EDT)
- ZIP code: 31537
- Area code: 912
- FIPS code: 13-39692
- GNIS feature ID: 0315599
- Website: charltoncountyga.us/city-of-homeland

Homeland is a city in Charlton County, Georgia, United States. The population was 886 in 2020.

== History ==
Homeland was founded in 1906.

== Geography ==
Homeland is located in southeastern Georgia at 30°51′34″N 82°1′19″W (30.859445, -82.022074). It is bordered by Folkston, the Charlton County seat. Homeland is the location where U.S. Routes 1 znd 23, branch off from U.S. Route 301, serving as the northern termnus of a three-route U.S. Highway concurrency that extends as far south as Callahan, Florida. Route 1 and 23 lead northwest to Waycross, while Route 301 leads north to Nahunta.

According to the United States Census Bureau, the city has a total area of 2.5 square miles (6.4 km^{2}), all land.

== Demographics ==
Historical population
Census	Pop.	Note	%±
1910	114		—
1920	138		21.1%
1930	152		10.1%
1940	213		40.1%
1950	276		29.6%
1960	508		84.1%
1970	595		17.1%
1980	683		14.8%
1990	981		43.6%
2000	765		−22.0%
2010	910		19.0%
2020	886		−2.6%
U.S. Decennial Census; 1850-1870 1870-1880; 1890-1910 1920-1930; 1940 1950 1960; 1970 1980 1990; 2000 2010

In 2010, its population was 910, though by 2020, its population declined to 886.
