= Okefenokee State Park =

Park in Georgia, United States

- IUCN category V (protected landscape/seascape)
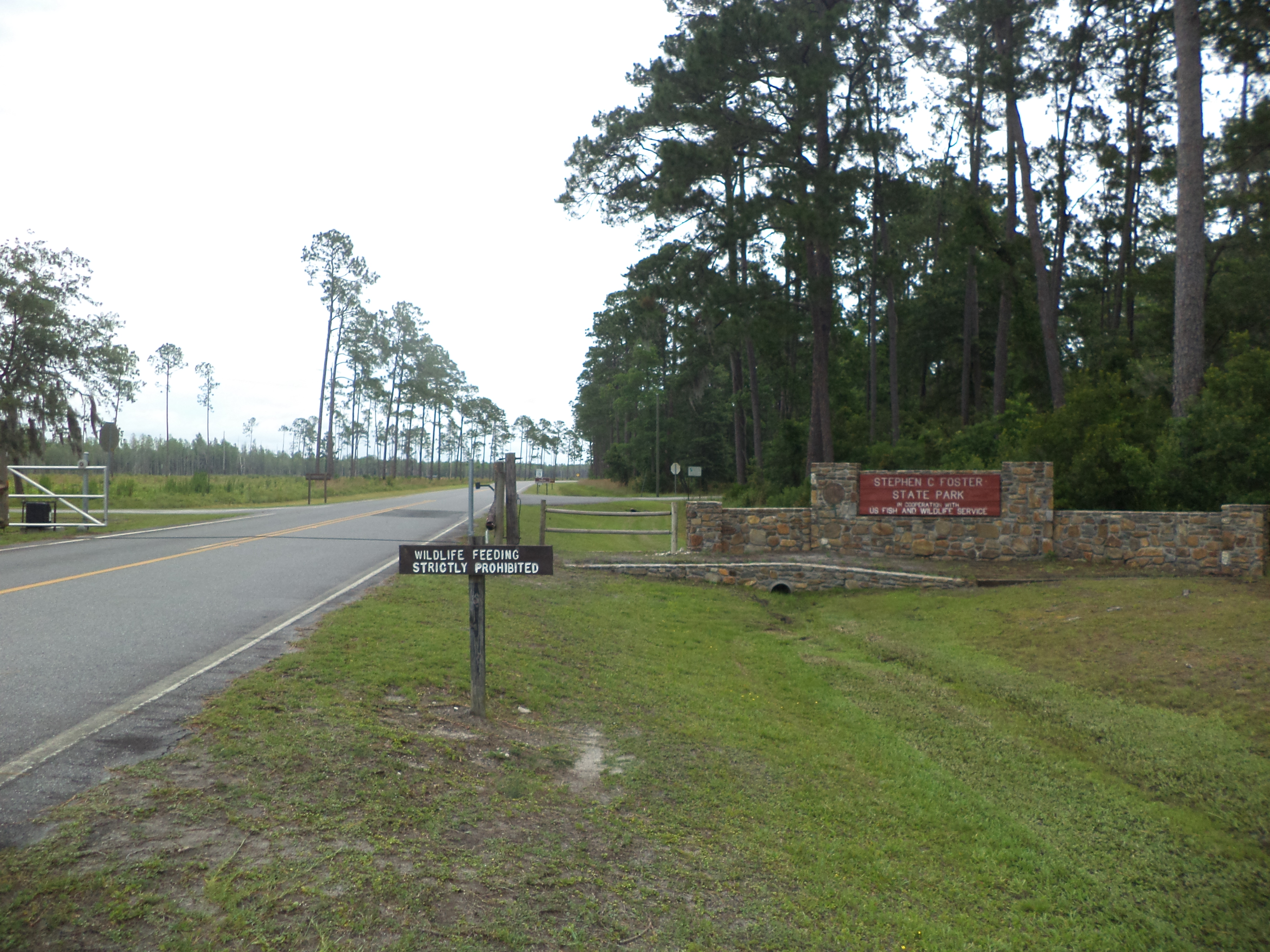
- Park entrance
- Interactive map of Okefenokee State Park
- Location: Charlton County, Georgia, U.S.
- Nearest city: Fargo
- Coordinates: 30°49′21″N 82°21′54″W
- Area: 120 acres (49 ha)
- Operator: Georgia State Parks & Historic Sites
- Website: gastateparks.org/Okefenokee

Okefenokee State Park (formerly Stephen C Foster State Park) is a 120-acre (49 ha) state park in the Okefenokee Swamp in Charlton County, Georgia. The park offers visitors several ways to explore the swamp's unique ecosystem.

In November 2016, the park was recognized as a Dark Sky park by the International Dark Sky Association.

In September 2026, Georgia Department of Natural Resources officially changed the name of the park to Okefenokee State Park. The park was previously named after Stephen Foster (1826–1864), the American songwriter who immortalized Georgia's Suwannee River in song.

== Facilities ==
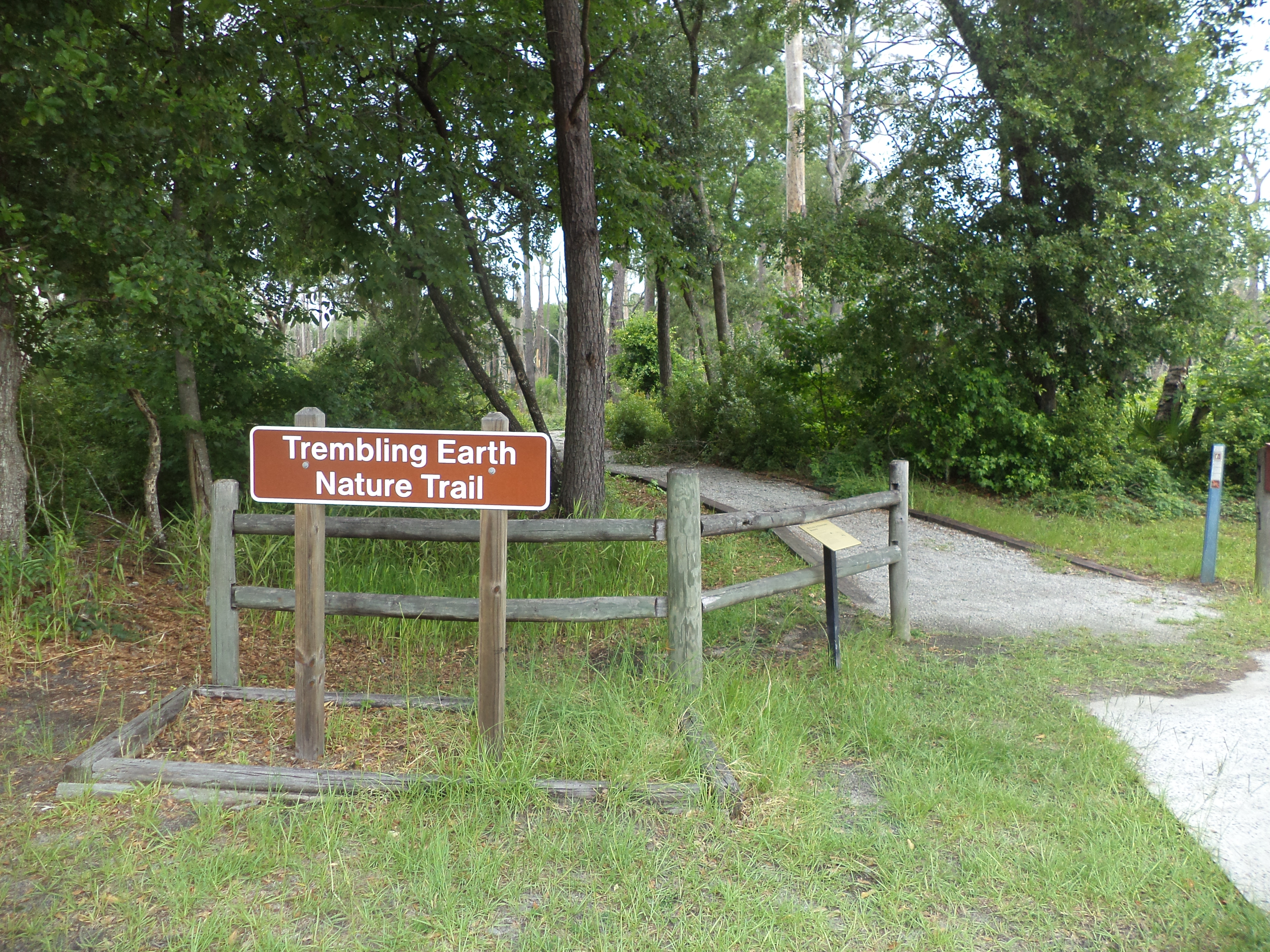
Trembling Earth Nature Trail

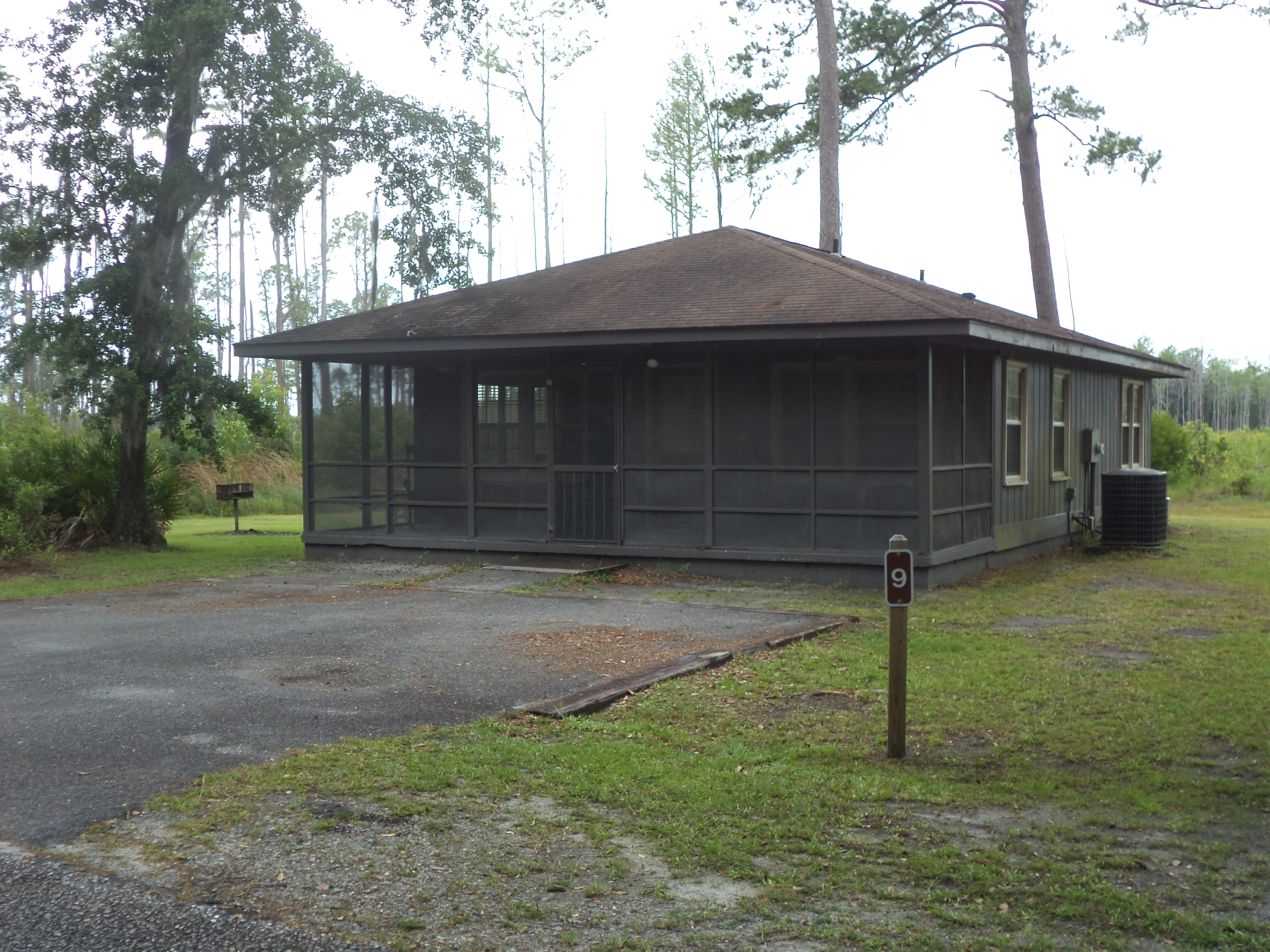
One of nine cottages for rent

The state park includes 64 tents, a trailer, RV campsites, nine cottages, an interpretive center, the 1.5-mile (2.5 km) Trembling Earth Nature Trail, 25 miles of day-use waterways, three picnic shelters and a pioneer campground

=== Suwannee River Visitor Center ===
Located 18 miles northeast of Fargo, the park's Suwannee River Visitor Center features exhibits about the animals, plants, and ecosystem of the Okefenokee Swamp and other environmental topics.

== Activities ==
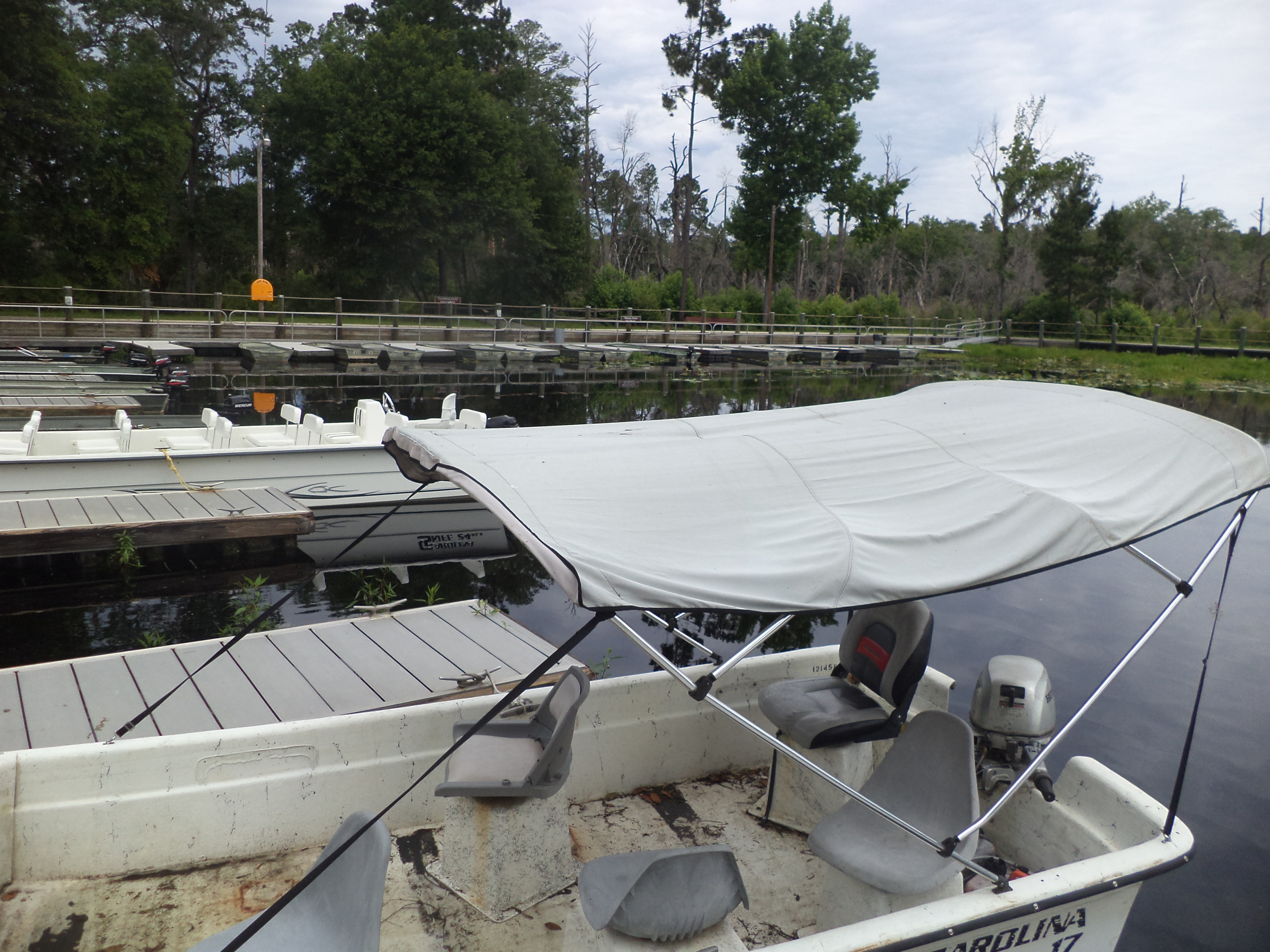
Fishing boat rentals

Activities at the state park include canoeing, kayaking, fishing boat rentals, guided boat tours, boating (ramp, 10 horsepower (7.5 kW) limit), fishing, and birdwatching.

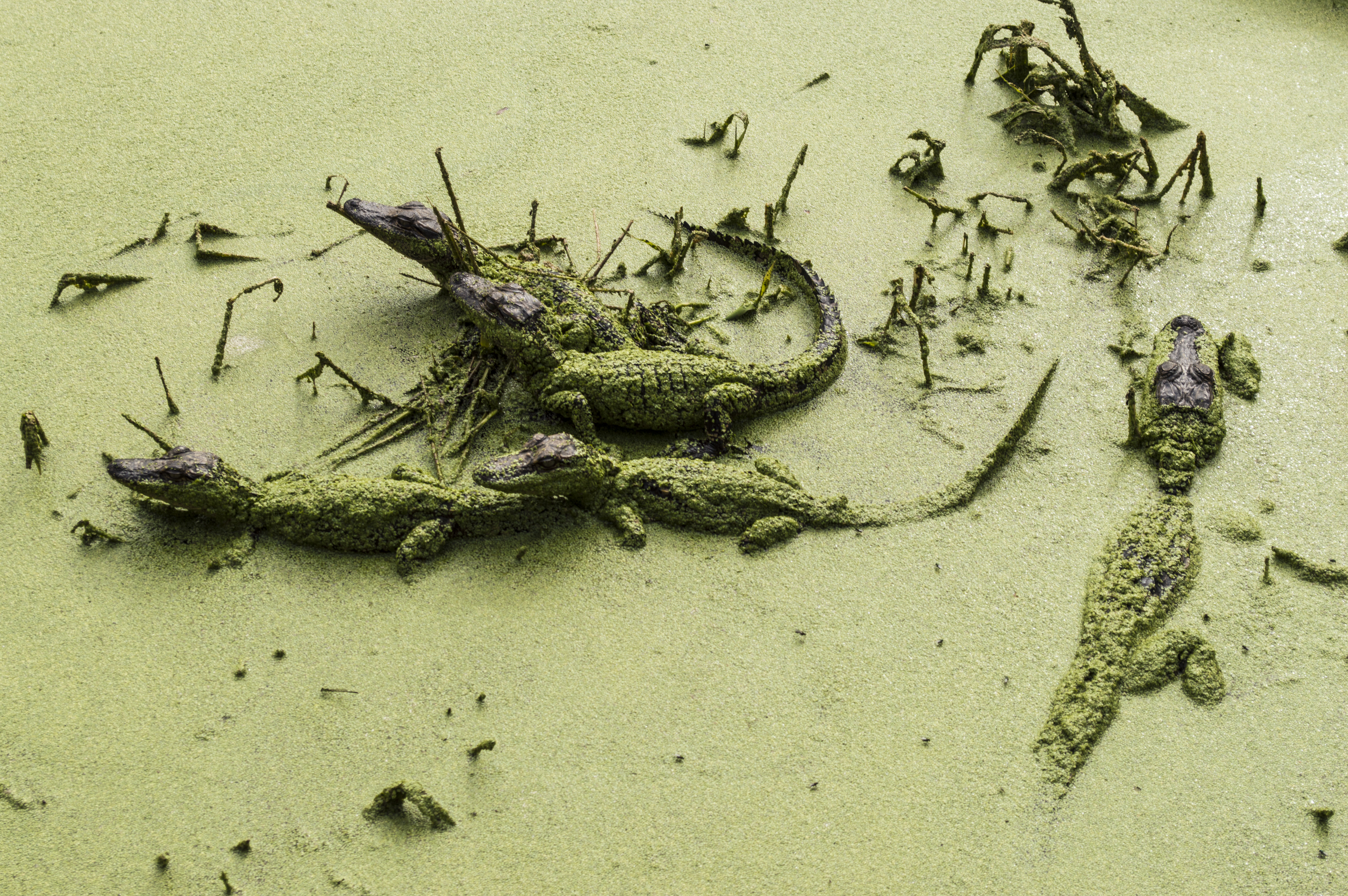
Baby gators sunning in duckweed after a cold December night in Okefenokee State Park.

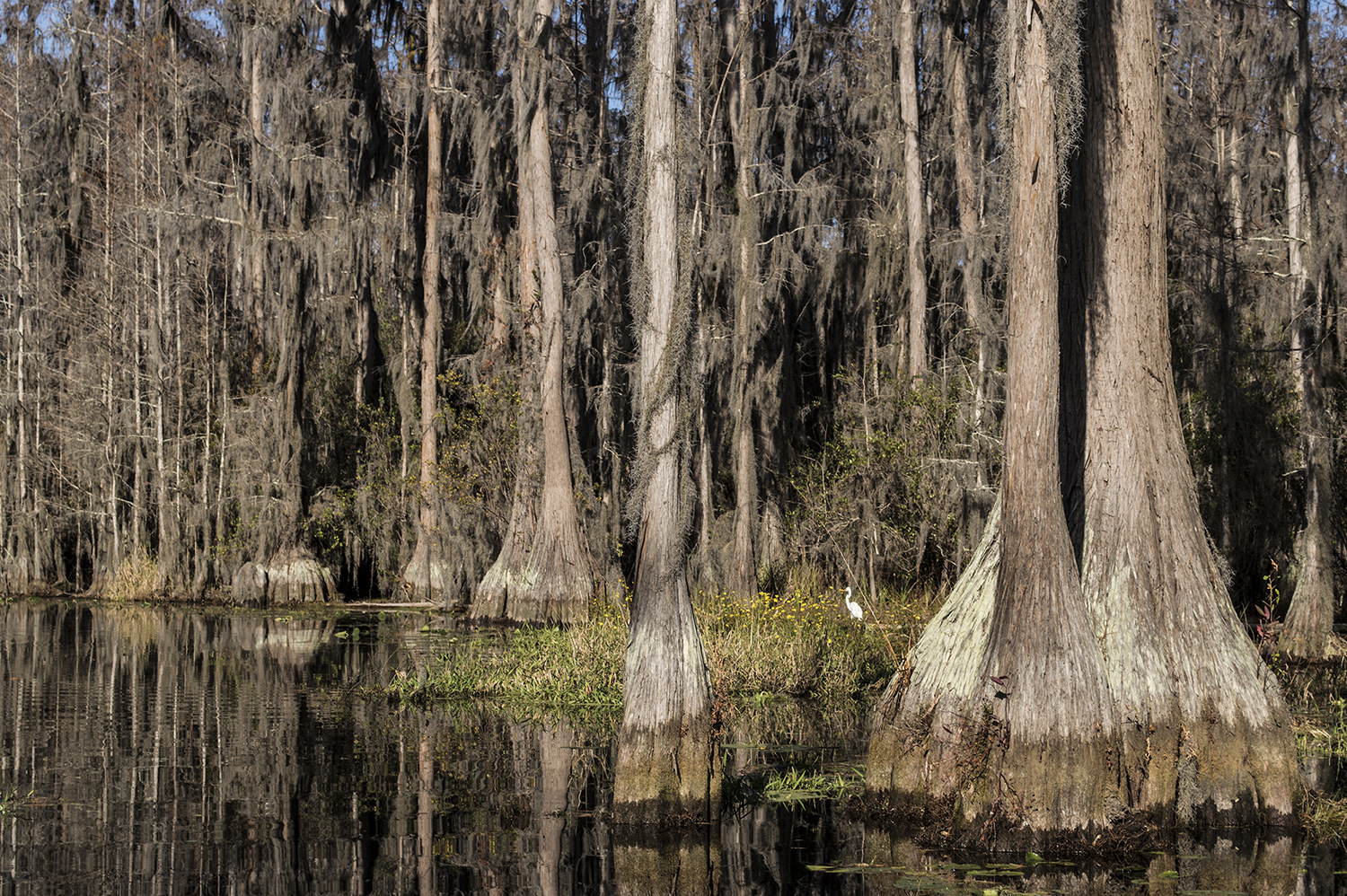
Cypresses on the water.
