= Charlton County, Georgia =

County in Georgia, United States

- County
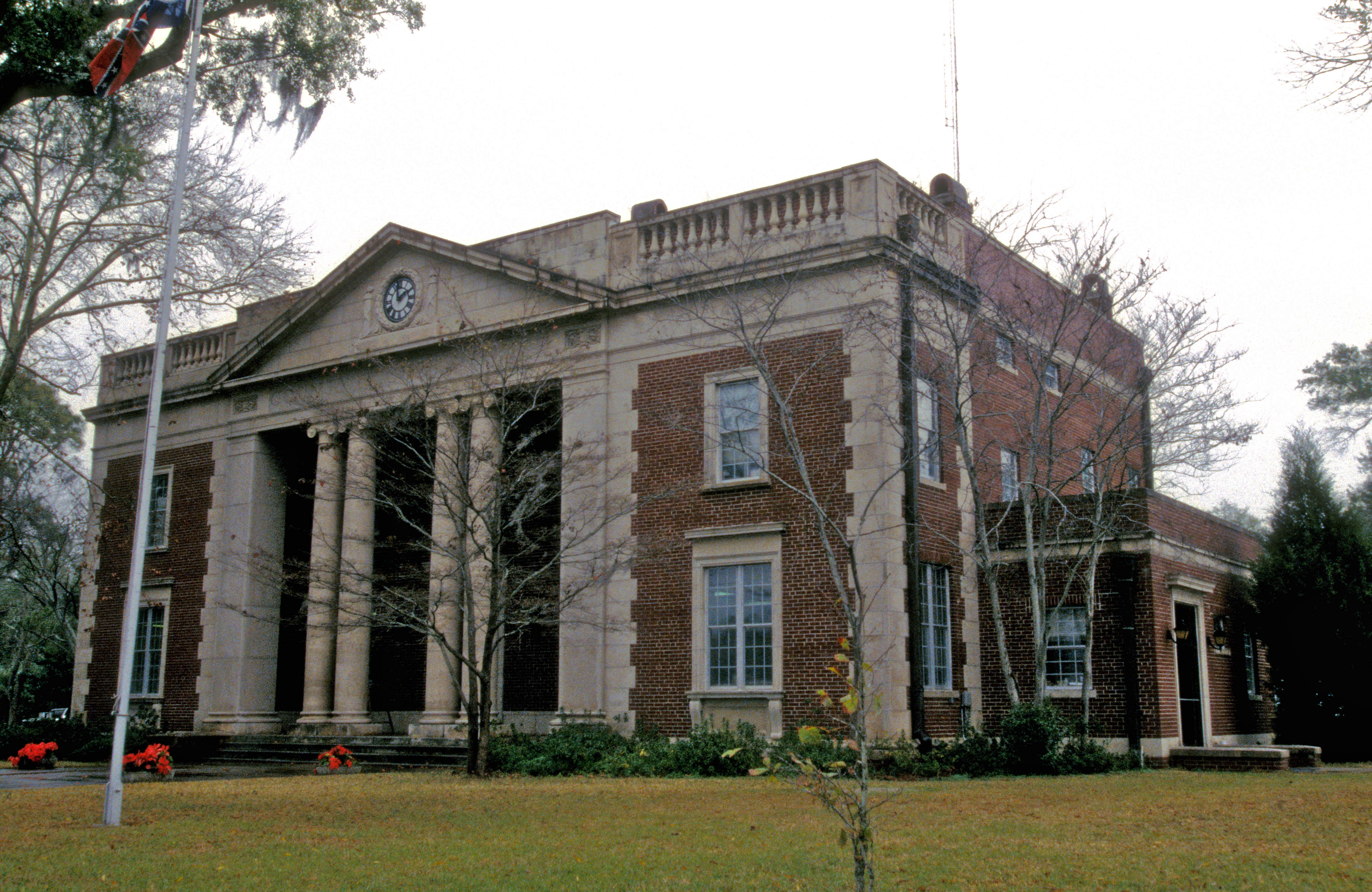
- Charlton County Courthouse in Folkston

- Logo

- Location within the U.S. state of Georgia
- Coordinates: 30°47′N 82°08′W
- Country: United States
- State: Georgia
- Founded: 1854; 172 years ago
- Named for: Robert M. Charlton
- Seat: Folkston
- Largest city: Folkston

Area
  - Total: 782 sq mi (2,030 km^{2})
  - Land: 774 sq mi (2,000 km^{2})
  - Water: 8.8 sq mi (23 km^{2}) 1.1%

Population (2020)
  - Total: 12,518
  - Estimate (2025): 13,121 ▲
  - Density: 16.4/sq mi (6.3/km^{2})
- Time zone: UTC−5 (Eastern)
  - Summer (DST): UTC−4 (EDT)
- Congressional district: 1st
- Website: charltoncountyga.us

Charlton County is the southernmost county in the U.S. state of Georgia. As of the 2020 census, the population was 12,518. The county seat is Folkston.

== History ==
Charlton County was created from a portion of Camden County, Georgia, by an act of the Georgia General Assembly on February 18, 1854. The original county seat was at Trader's Hill, until 1901. Additional lands from Ware County, Georgia, were added to Charlton's borders by an 1855 act of the General Assembly. In 1856, an additional legislative act redefined the Charlton–Camden borders again with each county ceding land to the other.

The county is named for Robert Milledge Charlton, a U. S. Senator from Georgia.

== Geography ==
According to the U.S. Census Bureau, the county has a total area of 782 square miles (2,030 km^{2}), of which 774 square miles (2,000 km^{2}) is land and 8.8 square miles (23 km^{2}) (1.1%) is water. It is the fifth-largest county by area in Georgia. It is the southernmost county in Georgia. A large portion of the county lies within the Okefenokee Swamp and its federally protected areas.

The entire central and southern portion of Charlton County is located in the St. Marys sub-basin of the St. Marys-Satilla basin. The county's northeastern portion, north of Homeland, is located in the Satilla River sub-basin of the St. Marys-Satilla basin. The western portion of Charlton County is located in the Upper Suwannee River sub-basin of the larger Suwannee River basin. The county's southern region is level with the northernmost part of the central and eastern Panhandle of the Florida peninsula.

=== Major highways ===
- US 1 / US 23 / SR 4
- US 301
- SR 15
- SR 23
- SR 40
  - SR 40 Conn.
- SR 94
- SR 121
- SR 177
- SR 185
- SR 252

=== Adjacent counties ===
- Brantley County - north
- Nassau County, Florida - south and east
- Camden County - east
- Baker County, Florida - south
- Ware County - north and west

=== National protected area ===
- Okefenokee National Wildlife Refuge (part)

=== Cities ===
- Folkston
- Homeland

=== Unincorporated communities ===
- Moniac
- Racepond
- Saint George
- Toledo
- Trader's Hill
- Uptonville

== Demographics ==
Historical population
Census	Pop.	Note	%±
1860	1,780		—
1870	1,897		6.6%
1880	2,154		13.5%
1890	3,335		54.8%
1900	3,592		7.7%
1910	4,722		31.5%
1920	4,536		−3.9%
1930	4,381		−3.4%
1940	5,256		20.0%
1950	4,821		−8.3%
1960	5,313		10.2%
1970	5,680		6.9%
1980	7,343		29.3%
1990	8,496		15.7%
2000	10,282		21.0%
2010	12,171		18.4%
2020	12,518		2.9%
2025 (est.)	13,121	▲	4.8%
U.S. Decennial Census; 1850-1870 1870-1880; 1890-1910 1920-1930; 1940 1950 1960; 1970 1980 1990; 2000 2010 2020

=== Racial and ethnic composition ===
Charlton County, Georgia – Racial and ethnic composition Note: the US Census treats Hispanic/Latino as an ethnic category. This table excludes Latinos from the racial categories and assigns them to a separate category. Hispanics/Latinos may be of any race.
Race / Ethnicity (NH = Non-Hispanic)	Pop 1980	Pop 1990	Pop 2000	Pop 2010	Pop 2020	% 1980	% 1990	% 2000	% 2010	% 2020
White alone (NH)	5,140	6,070	7,014	8,116	7,532	70.00%	71.45%	68.22%	66.68%	60.17%
Black or African American alone (NH)	2,147	2,352	2,990	3,443	2,386	29.24%	27.68%	29.08%	28.29%	19.06%
Native American or Alaska Native alone (NH)	11	31	39	38	40	0.15%	0.36%	0.38%	0.31%	0.32%
Asian alone (NH)	3	8	35	76	109	0.04%	0.09%	0.34%	0.62%	0.87%
Native Hawaiian or Pacific Islander alone (NH)	x	x	6	3	2	x	x	0.06%	0.02%	0.02%
Other race alone (NH)	3	0	3	5	30	0.04%	0.00%	0.03%	0.04%	0.24%
Mixed race or Multiracial (NH)	x	x	114	180	383	x	x	1.11%	1.48%	3.06%
Hispanic or Latino (any race)	39	35	81	310	2,036	0.53%	0.41%	0.79%	2.55%	16.26%
Total	7,343	8,496	10,282	12,171	12,518	100.00%	100.00%	100.00%	100.00%	100.00%

=== 2020 census ===
As of the 2020 census, the county had a population of 12,518. Of the residents, 19.0% were under the age of 18 and 15.2% were 65 years of age or older; the median age was 40.8 years. For every 100 females there were 140.7 males, and for every 100 females age 18 and over there were 151.1 males. 0.0% of residents lived in urban areas and 100.0% lived in rural areas.

The racial makeup of the county was 69.9% White, 21.0% Black or African American, 0.4% American Indian and Alaska Native, 0.9% Asian, 0.0% Native Hawaiian and Pacific Islander, 4.3% from some other race, and 3.6% from two or more races. Hispanic or Latino residents of any race comprised 16.3% of the population.

There were 3,993 households in the county, of which 31.2% had children under the age of 18 living with them and 28.0% had a female householder with no spouse or partner present. Of those households, 2,685 were families; about 27.3% were made up of individuals and 11.9% had someone living alone who was 65 years of age or older.

There were 4,660 housing units, of which 14.3% were vacant. Among occupied housing units, 74.3% were owner-occupied and 25.7% were renter-occupied. The homeowner vacancy rate was 1.8% and the rental vacancy rate was 8.9%.

== Politics ==
United States presidential election results for Charlton County, Georgia
Year	Republican		Democratic		Third party(ies)	
Year	No.	%	No.	%	No.	%
1912	22	9.95%	150	67.87%	49	22.17%
1916	52	22.41%	169	72.84%	11	4.74%
1920	28	15.14%	157	84.86%	0	0.00%
1924	20	11.24%	151	84.83%	7	3.93%
1928	160	27.83%	415	72.17%	0	0.00%
1932	32	8.82%	330	90.91%	1	0.28%
1936	28	5.63%	468	94.16%	1	0.20%
1940	60	9.65%	562	90.35%	0	0.00%
1944	89	16.15%	462	83.85%	0	0.00%
1948	70	12.32%	339	59.68%	159	27.99%
1952	288	26.11%	815	73.89%	0	0.00%
1956	204	21.38%	750	78.62%	0	0.00%
1960	289	28.28%	733	71.72%	0	0.00%
1964	1,179	67.26%	574	32.74%	0	0.00%
1968	332	17.08%	455	23.41%	1,157	59.52%
1972	1,244	80.05%	310	19.95%	0	0.00%
1976	452	20.53%	1,750	79.47%	0	0.00%
1980	779	34.08%	1,469	64.26%	38	1.66%
1984	1,368	55.18%	1,111	44.82%	0	0.00%
1988	1,327	57.60%	943	40.93%	34	1.48%
1992	1,333	46.09%	1,127	38.97%	432	14.94%
1996	1,374	45.33%	1,368	45.13%	289	9.53%
2000	1,770	62.86%	1,015	36.04%	31	1.10%
2004	2,311	68.15%	1,064	31.38%	16	0.47%
2008	2,466	66.70%	1,197	32.38%	34	0.92%
2012	2,527	67.12%	1,197	31.79%	41	1.09%
2016	2,951	73.21%	1,004	24.91%	76	1.89%
2020	3,419	74.85%	1,105	24.19%	44	0.96%
2024	3,607	77.94%	1,007	21.76%	14	0.30%

United States Senate election results for Charlton County, Georgia2
Year	Republican		Democratic		Third party(ies)	
Year	No.	%	No.	%	No.	%
2020	3,357	74.98%	1,016	22.69%	104	2.32%
2020	2,945	75.30%	966	24.70%	0	0.00%

United States Senate election results for Charlton County, Georgia3
Year	Republican		Democratic		Third party(ies)	
Year	No.	%	No.	%	No.	%
2020	334	7.73%	1,621	37.50%	2,368	54.78%
2020	2,947	75.58%	952	24.42%	0	0.00%
2022	2,552	75.35%	780	23.03%	55	1.62%
2022	2,377	76.50%	730	23.50%	0	0.00%

Georgia Gubernatorial election results for Charlton County
Year	Republican		Democratic		Third party(ies)	
Year	No.	%	No.	%	No.	%
2022	2,654	77.94%	728	21.38%	23	0.68%

As of the 2020s, Charlton County is a Republican stronghold, voting 78% for Donald Trump in 2024. For elections to the United States House of Representatives, Charlton County is part of Georgia's 1st congressional district, currently represented by Buddy Carter. For elections to the Georgia State Senate, Charlton County is part of District 3. For elections to the Georgia House of Representatives, Charlton County is part of District 174.

== See also ==
- National Register of Historic Places listings in Charlton County, Georgia
- List of counties in Georgia
