= Proctor House =

Proctor House may refer to:

- Brown-Proctor House, Scottsboro, Alabama, listed on the National Register of Historic Places (NRHP) in Jackson County, Alabama
- Davis-Proctor House, Twin City, Georgia, listed on the NRHP in Emanuel County, Georgia
- Proctor House (Bryantsville, Kentucky), listed on the NRHP in Garrard County, Kentucky
- George N. Proctor House, Waverly, Kentucky, listed on the NRHP in Union County, Kentucky
- Proctor House (Bel Air, Maryland), listed on the NRHP in Harford County, Maryland
- William Proctor House (Arlington, Massachusetts), listed on the NRHP in Middlesex County, Massachusetts
- William Proctor House (Marengo, Indiana), listed on the NRHP in Crawford County, Indiana
- Rea-Proctor Homestead, Danvers, Massachusetts, listed on the NRHP in Essex County, Massachusetts
- John Proctor House (Peabody, Massachusetts), listed on the NRHP in Essex County, Massachusetts
- John Proctor House (Westford, Massachusetts), listed on the NRHP in Middlesex County, Massachusetts
- Proctor House (Victoria, Texas), |listed on the NRHP in Victoria County, Texas
- Proctor-Vandenberge House, Victoria, Texas, listed on the NRHP in Victoria County, Texas
- Proctor-Clement House, Rutland, Vermont, listed on the NRHP in Rutland County, Vermont
- Proctor Maple Research Farm, Underhill, Vermont, listed on the NRHP in Chittenden County, Vermont

== See also ==
- John Proctor House (disambiguation)
- Proctor Building (disambiguation)
- Proctor's Theater (disambiguation)
