= Brewer House =

Brewer House may refer to:

- Adrian Brewer Studio, Little Rock, Arkansas, listed on the National Register of Historic Places (NRHP) in Pulaski County
- A. B. Brewer Building, Mountain View, Arkansas, NRHP-listed in Stone County
- John F. Brewer House, Mountain View, Arizona, NRHP-listed in Stone County
- Selden Brewer House, East Hartford, Connecticut, NRHP-listed
- Bacheller-Brewer Model Home Estate, Sarasota, Florida, NRHP-listed
- Edward Hill Brewer House, Winter Park, Florida, NRHP-listed
- Albert Neal Durden House, also known as the Durden-Brinson-Brewer House, Twin City, Georgia, NRHP-listed
- C. Brewer Building, Honolulu, Hawaii, NRHP-listed
- Freeman-Brewer-Sawyer House, Hillsboro, Illinois, NRHP-listed
- Luther A. and Elinore T. Brewer House, Cedar Rapids, Iowa, NRHP-listed in Linn County
- David J. Brewer House, Leavenworth, Kansas, NRHP-listed in Leavenworth County
- Henrietta Brewer House, Robbinston, Maine, NRHP-listed
- John N.M. Brewer House, Robbinston, Maine, NRHP-listed
- Bingham-Brewer House, Rockville, Maryland, NRHP-listed
- Capt. John Brewer House, Monterey, Massachusetts, NRHP-listed
- Moses Brewer House, Sudbury, Massachusetts, NRHP-listed
- Brewer Log House, Springfield, Ohio, NRHP-listed in Clark County
- Sheriff Stephen Wiley Brewer Farmstead, Pittsboro, North Carolina, NRHP-listed
- John Henry and Minnie Tate Brewer House, Austin, Texas, NRHP-listed in Travis County
- Miller-Brewer House, Rochester, Washington, NRHP-listed
