= National Register of Historic Places listings in Emanuel County, Georgia =

This is a list of properties and districts in Emanuel County, Georgia that are listed on the National Register of Historic Places (NRHP).

This National Park Service list is complete through NPS recent listings posted March 21, 2025.

`

== Current listings ==
	Name on the Register	Image	Date listed	Location	City or town	Description
1	James Coleman House	James Coleman House	April 28, 1992 (#92000384)	323 N. Main St. 32°36′07″N 82°20′11″W	Swainsboro	Built in 1904; now a Bed and Breakfast
2	Josiah Davis House	Josiah Davis House	October 5, 1982 (#82000145)	South of Canoochee on GA 192; 32°37′55″N 82°09′59″W	Canoochee	
3	Davis-Proctor House	Davis-Proctor House	December 20, 2010 (#10001049)	133 First Ave. 32°34′59″N 82°09′00″W	Twin City	Built in 1890, is a contributing property to the Twin City Historic District
4	Albert Neal Durden House	Albert Neal Durden House	April 20, 1990 (#90000561)	Co. Rd. 360; 32°34′19″N 82°13′26″W	Twin City	
5	Emanuel County Courthouse and Sheriff Department	Emanuel County Courthouse and Sheriff Department	June 14, 1995 (#95000715)	Main St. 32°35′49″N 82°20′05″W	Swainsboro	Demolished
6	First Methodist Episcopal Church	First Methodist Episcopal Church	February 12, 1999 (#99000160)	Junction of Third Ave. and Third St. 32°26′29″N 82°12′50″W	Stillmore	
7	John Rountree Log House	John Rountree Log House	August 15, 1997 (#97000841)	Junction of U.S. Route 80 and GA 192; 32°35′02″N 82°09′55″W	Twin City	A Place in Peril as of 2017. Local website
8	Swainsboro Light and Water Plant	Swainsboro Light and Water Plant	October 27, 2004 (#04001184)	Bounded by East Moring and South Coleman Sts. and the Norfolk Southern Railway; 32°35′48″N 82°19′52″W	Swainsboro	Built in 1921
9	Twin City Historic District	Twin City Historic District	February 8, 2014 (#13001168)	6th, Railroad & 5th Aves., Maple & College Sts. 32°35′01″N 82°09′02″W	Twin City	
