= John Proctor House =

John Proctor House may refer to:

- John Proctor House (Peabody, Massachusetts), listed on the National Register of Historic Places in Essex County, Massachusetts
- John Proctor House (Westford, Massachusetts), listed on the National Register of Historic Places in Middlesex County, Massachusetts

== See also ==
- Proctor House (disambiguation)
