= William Proctor House =

William Proctor House may refer to:

- William Proctor House (Marengo, Indiana)
- William Proctor House (Arlington, Massachusetts)
