= Josiah Davis House =

Historic house in Georgia, United States

- U.S. National Register of Historic Places
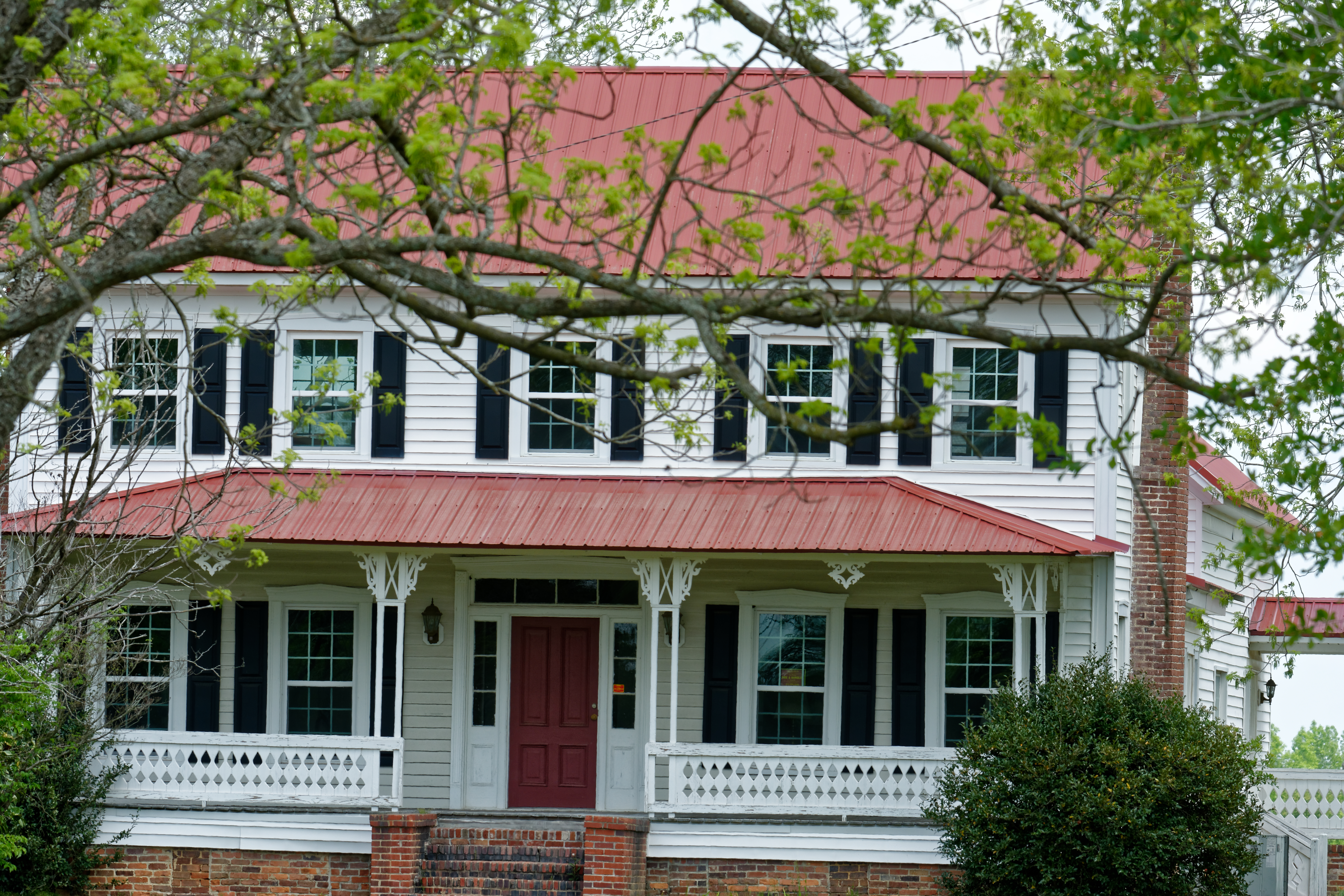
- The house in 2017

- Location within Georgia Location within the United States
- Location: South of Canoochee on GA 192, Emanuel County, Georgia
- Nearest city: Canoochee, Georgia
- Coordinates: 32.63208°N 82.16633°W
- Area: 321 acres (130 ha)
- Built: 1869
- Architectural style: Plantation Plain
- NRHP reference No.: 82000145
- Added to NRHP: October 5, 1982

The Josiah Davis House, south of Canoochee in Emanuel County, Georgia, is a Plantation Plain-style house built in 1869 on a 321 acres (130 ha) property. The property, with six contributing buildings, was listed on the National Register of Historic Places in 1982.

== Description and history ==
"The Josiah Davis House significance in architecture is achieved on several points. First it is a good example of the transition of architectural styles. The Plantation Plain style had its height in Georgia during the period from 1830 to 1850 yet this house is an example of the carryover or revival of the style into the Reconstruction Era of 1865-1870 when, according to traditional history, most everyone in the South was too destitute to build anything. The house exemplifies the same characteristics of the style from its antebellum heyday, two rooms up and two down, central hall, shed porch on the front and back (in this case only on the front), with a detached kitchen. Its interior has simple, wide boards on the floors, walls and ceilings with no plaster, yet it has elaborate mantels on the lower floor. It is bare of any Greek Revival or Victorian detailing save for the ornamentation of the front porch and the downstairs fireplace mantels. Secondly, it is significant because it has been little changed from its construction and thus provides a look at an original, virtually untampered example of a house of that era. Even the heating has been barely modernized. Thirdly as mentioned above, it is important in reflecting the building patterns of the Reconstruction Era, an era only slowly being understood by contemporary historians. It is one of only a few documented Reconstruction Era homes in the Plantation Plain Style, which might indicate either a resurgence of the earlier style after the supposed construction halt during the Civil War years or the continued use of the style even during the War. The house is significant in local history as the farm house or main house of Josiah Davis (1847-1902) a native of Emanuel County who with his wife Sarah Canady (1849-1927), a childhood neighbor, built this house shortly after their marriage around 1869 and operated a relatively small 318 acre farm that has retained virtually its same acreage since the house was built. Davis was a Civil War veteran who, once the war was over and he returned home, established his farm and never moved from the area again. He raised cotton and corn with the use of sharecroppers, who for the most part were hired freedmen and women, former slaves from nearby plantations. His house was small, being only one room deep, a total of four rooms, with a detached kit which would have fit their family of three children well. His obituary referred to him as a "frugal and energetic farmer" and mentioned no civic or fraternal activities. He was buried not far from his farm in the Old Canoochee Cemetery. After Josiah Davis 1 death, his son Dr. George Davis raised long staple cotton there until the advent of the boll weevil. The house remained in the Davis family until after the widow's death when it was sold to the Peacock family, the present owners. The Josiah Davis House is significant in agriculture because it retains intact the 318 acres Davis is known to have farmed in 1869. It was here where, after he returned from service for the Confederacy, he began his own farm and raised his own family. He would have been forced by the new economic times to have used sharecroppers, that is workers, primarily former slaves, who would be paid for their services out of the crops that were raised. The main staples here were cotton and corn, as in most nearby farms in Georgia. This farm is significant because it typifies the many that were established during the Reconstruction Era when large plantations were no longer feasible for a beginning farmer and a new social and economic order was emerging. Few of these types of farms have survived with their same acreage, main house, and surroundings free from intrusions."
