= Proctor Building =

Proctor Building may refer to:

in the United States (by state)

- Proctor Building (Libertyville, Illinois), listed on the NRHP in Lake County, Illinois
- Brown-Proctoria Hotel, Winchester, Kentucky, listed on the NRHP in Clark County, Kentucky
- Fort Proctor, Shell Beach, Louisiana, listed on the NRHP in St. Bernard Parish, Louisiana
- John C. Proctor Recreation Center, Peoria, Illinois, listed on the NRHP in Peoria County, Illinois
- Procter and Gamble Baltimore Plant, Baltimore, Maryland, listed on the NRHP in Baltimore, Maryland
- O'Connor-Proctor Building, Victoria, Texas, listed on the NRHP in Victoria County, Texas

== See also ==
- Proctor House (disambiguation)
