= Proctor's Theater =

Proctor's Theater or Proctor Theatre or variations may refer to:

- Proctor's Theatre (Chelsea, Manhattan), also known as Proctor's Twenty-Third Street Theatre
- Proctor's Theatre (Schenectady, New York), listed on the NRHP as F. F. Proctor Theatre and Arcade in Schenectady, New York
- Proctor's Theater (Troy, New York), listed on the National Register of Historic Places in Rensselaer County, New York
- Proctor's Theater (Yonkers, New York), listed on the National Register of Historic Places in Westchester County, New York
- Columbus Theatre (New York City), also known as Proctor's Theatre or Proctor’s 125th Street Theatre

== See also ==
- Proctor House (disambiguation)
