= Twin City Historic District =

Historic district in Georgia, United States

- U.S. National Register of Historic Places
- U.S. Historic district
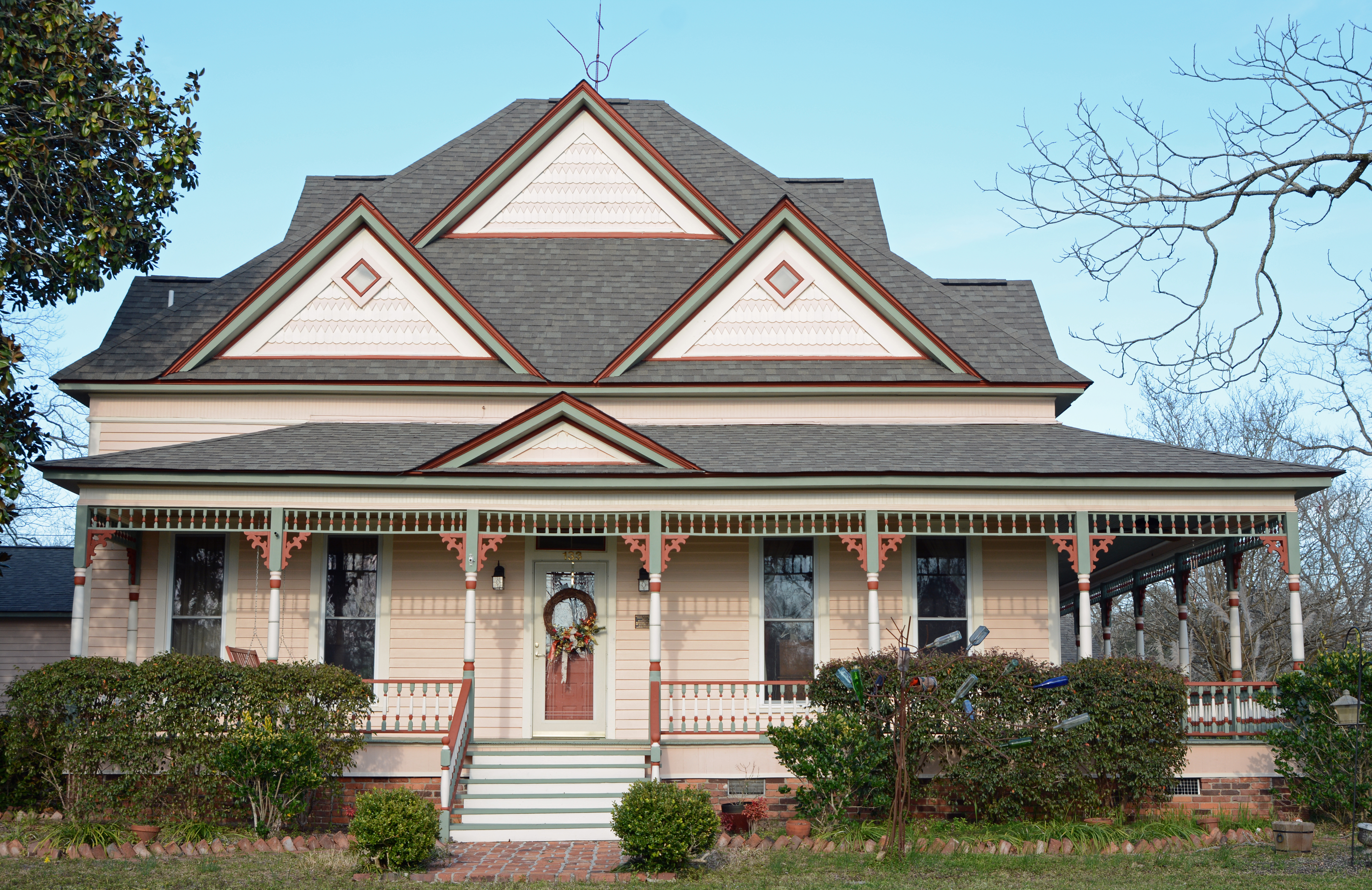
- Davis-Proctor House, in the district

- Location within Georgia Location within the United States
- Location: 6th, Railroad & 5th Aves., Maple & College Sts., Twin City, Georgia
- Coordinates: 32.583486°N 82.150577°W
- Area: 255 acres (103 ha)
- NRHP reference No.: 13001168
- Added to NRHP: February 8, 2014

The Twin City Historic District in Twin City in Emanuel County, Georgia is a historic district which was listed on the National Register of Historic Places in 2014.

Twin City in its entirety covers a 3.6 square miles (9.3 km^{2}) area. It is the combination of two formerly separate towns, Summit and Graymont. The historic district is 255 acres (1.03 km^{2}) in size and includes the shared civic center area, the two towns' commercial centers, and residential areas.

It includes 6th Ave. on the west; the north side of Railroad Ave. on the north; Maple St. on the east; and College St. and 5th Ave. on the south.

The district includes 135 contributing buildings and one contributing structure (a water tower), plus 54 non-contributing buildings.

== Civic Center area ==
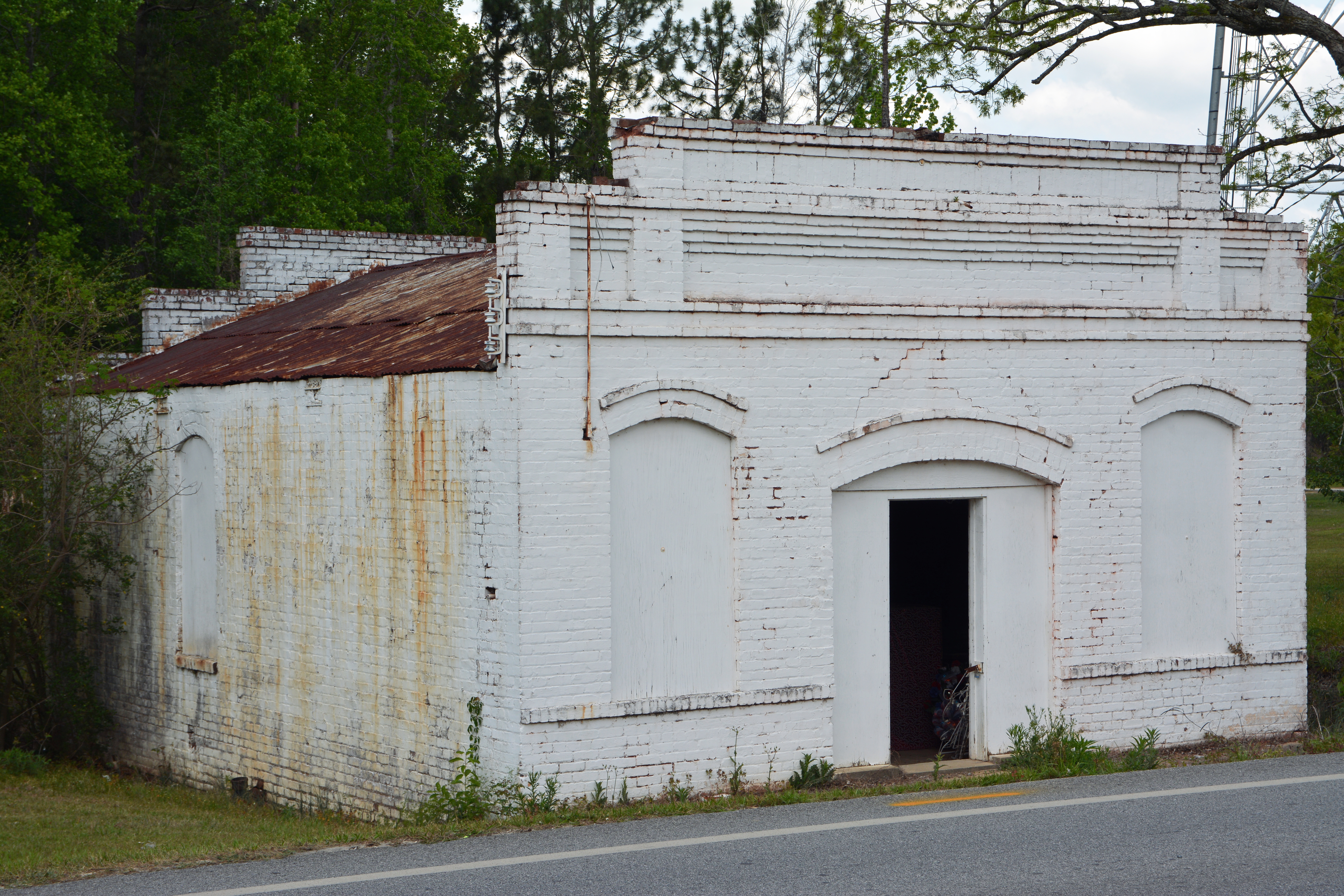
Jail

In the civic center area, buildings are widely spaced. The district includes:

- Jail and former city hall (c.1900), a brick building with arched doorway and window openings (photo 24 in photos accompanying NRHP nomination), located at the border between Summit and Graymont
- Church of Christ (c.1900-1910), brick-clad with a Craftsman-style porch (with battered posts on piers, photo 19)
- Baptist Rest Primitive Baptist Church (1907), a Gothic Revival-style gable front church with square corner towers, each with paired lancet windows, one with a flat roof and the other with a six-sided conical roof
- Twin City Methodist Church (1927), double gable front with elements of Greek Revival style including cornice with dentils supported by pilasters
- Adam Brinson Chapter DAR House (1934), a log cabin (photo 23)
- Water tower (1937), which as of 2013 was painted with "Twin City Home of the Bulldogs" (photo 14)
- Boy Scout hut (c.1945), board-and-batten-sided one-story building built by World War II veterans (photo 25)
- First Baptist Church (1949), brick clad, with temple-style front: portico columns and pilasters supporting pediment (photo 18)
- Emanuel County Institute Agricultural Building (1954), one-story brick building with entrance arch (photo 20)
- Emanuel County Institute Main Building (1954), one-story brick building with a cross-gabled roof (photo 21)
- Emanuel County Institute School Auditorium (1954), Modern-style brick building with clerestory windows, and with a concrete canopy over its metal entrance doors (photo 22)

== Historic Summit ==
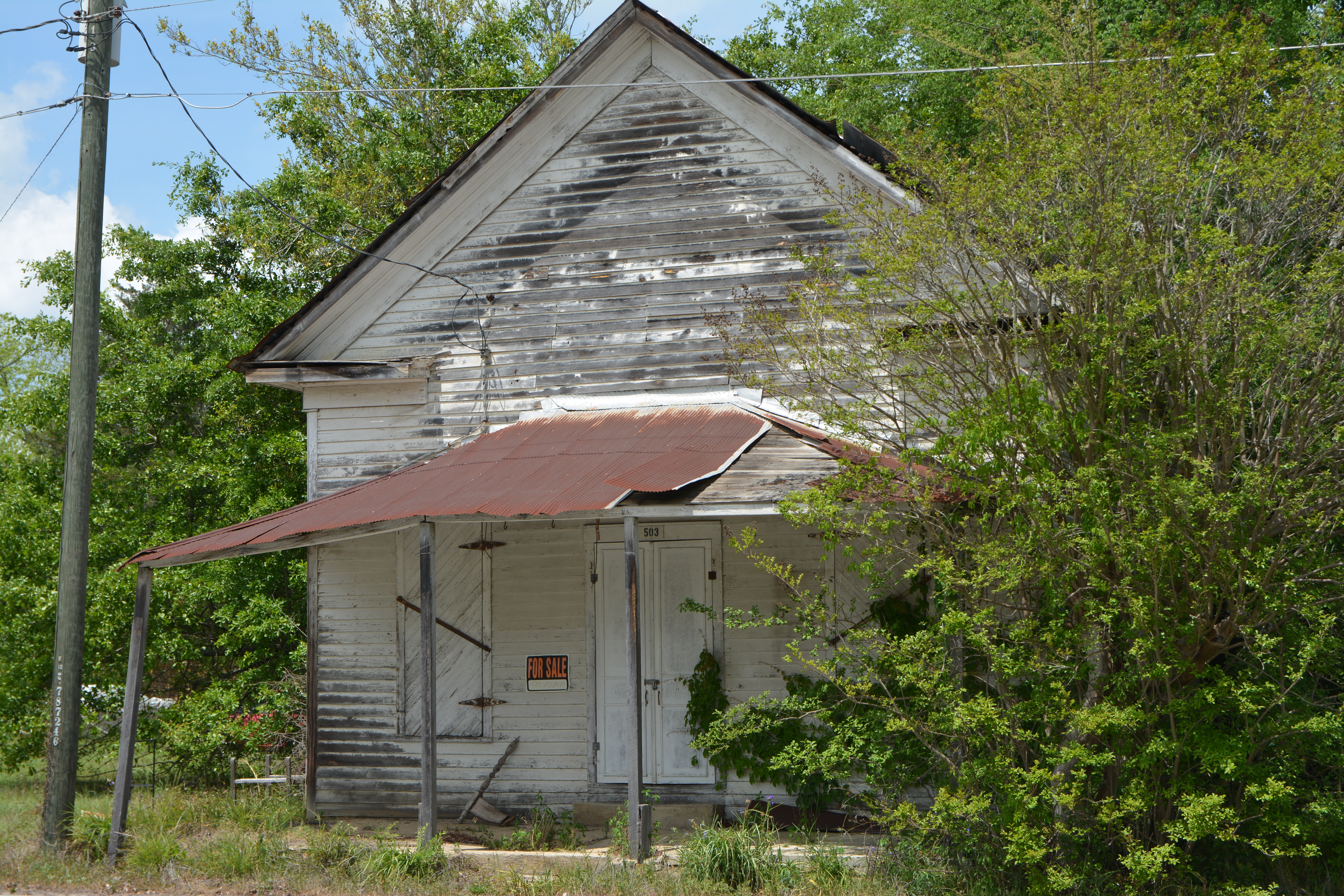
503 N. Railroad Ave., c. 1860s

The historic town center of Summit, to the northeast, and north of U.S. Highway 80, includes historic commercial buildings mostly on the north side of Georgia Highway 23 (North Railroad Ave.), mostly built from 1890 to 1945.

- 503 N. Railroad Avenue (c.1860s), probably the oldest building in Summit (photo 4).
- O.A. Hall store (early 1900s), two-story concrete-block building
- Railroad depot (1868), on Railroad Avenue, was moved to this location around 1954 from what is now the intersection of U.S. 80 and Railroad Avenue, after the railroad tracks were removed
- Gas station (1955), at depot's former location (photo 13)
- Secab Building (c.1940), adjacent to depot, one-story gable-roof building with metal siding built as a warehouse on a brick pier foundation
- Commissary building (c.1898), across from depot, one-story gable-front corrugated metal building with shedroof porch (photo 7)
- Brick commercial building (1903) (photo 1)
- Summit Bank (1904), two-story brick building with Italian Renaissance features (photo 2)
- Brick commercial building (1907), with brick pilasters separating three storefronts (photo 3)
- 503 Railroad Avenue (c.1860-1870), thought to be oldest commercial building in Summit (photo 4)

== Summit residential area ==
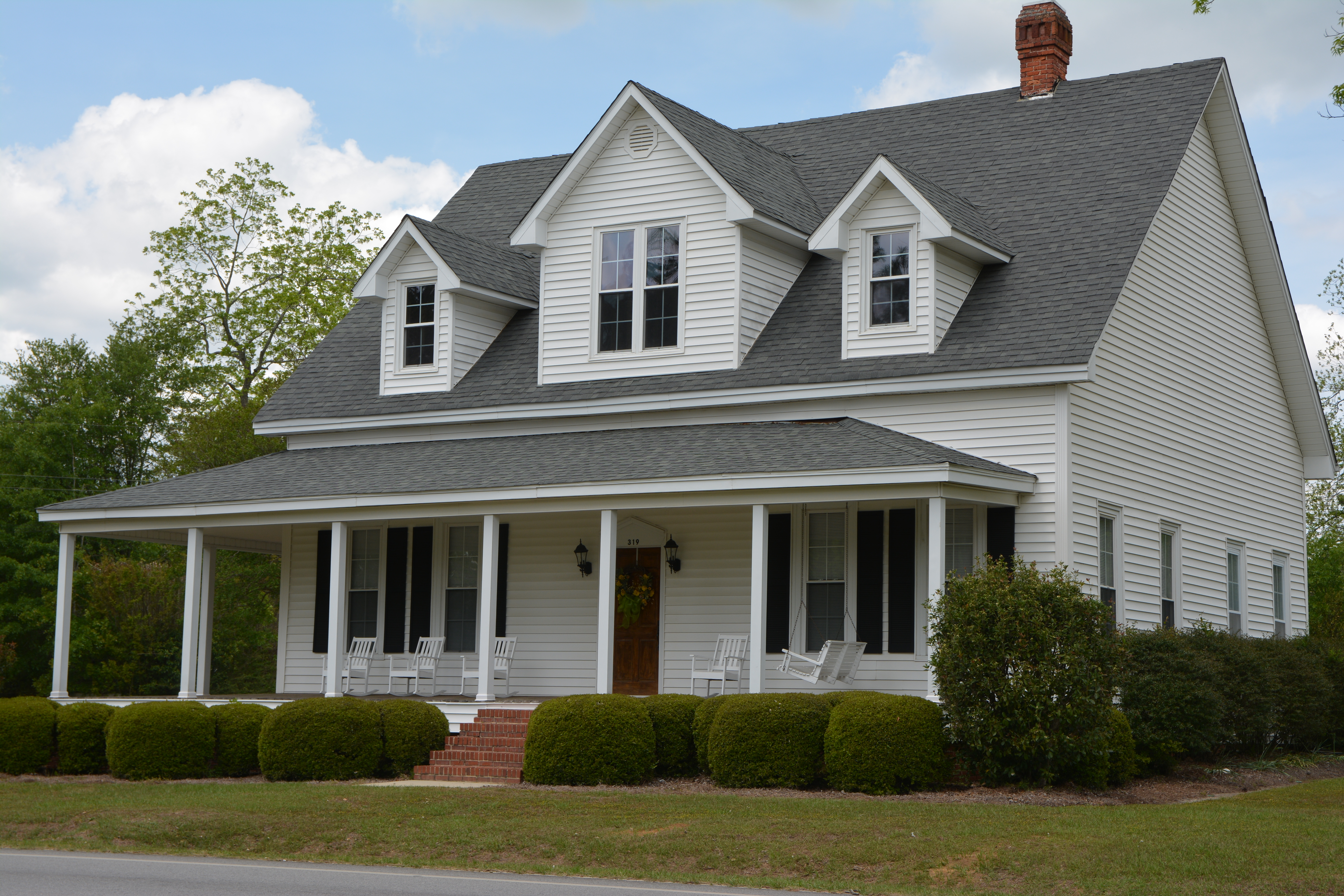
House in Summit area

Summit's residential areas in the district are to the north and south of Railroad Avenue. Larger houses have twin gables with decorative wood shingles. Notable examples include:

- 128 W. Broad Street, a Central Hallway cottage with "multi-light windows, a shed-roof porch with square posts, and sidelights on either side of the entrance" (photo 9).
- Davis-Proctor House (1890), 133 1st Avenue, separately listed on the National Register, is "a one-and-a-half-story frame Folk Victorian, Georgian cottage. The house has a symmetrical front fac;ade with central entrance with original door and transom. The wraparound porch has decorative spindle work, brackets, and turned posts and balustrade. The multi-gable complex roof has decorative shingles in the gables. The house retains its original wood door and window surrounds" (photo 12)
- 115 W. Broad Street (1898) "It is a one-story, gabled-wing, frame cottage with front projecting bay. Elements of Neoclassical Revival style include the transom and sidelights. as well as the attenuated Tuscan columns on the wraparound porch."
- 202 N. Railroad Street (1908), similar to 115 W. Broad Street. "It is a one-story Folk Victorian, gabled-wing, frame cottage. The front entrance includes a transom and sidelights and the full front porch has decorative turned posts and balustrade."
- Sturgis House (1918), 12 N. Railroad Street "is another good example of a Folk Victorian-style house with decorative elements including wooden shingles in alternating rows of fish-scale and saw-tooth shingles in the gable ends. The wraparound porch has turned posts and balustrade with scroll-sawn decorative brackets."

== Graymont commercial center ==
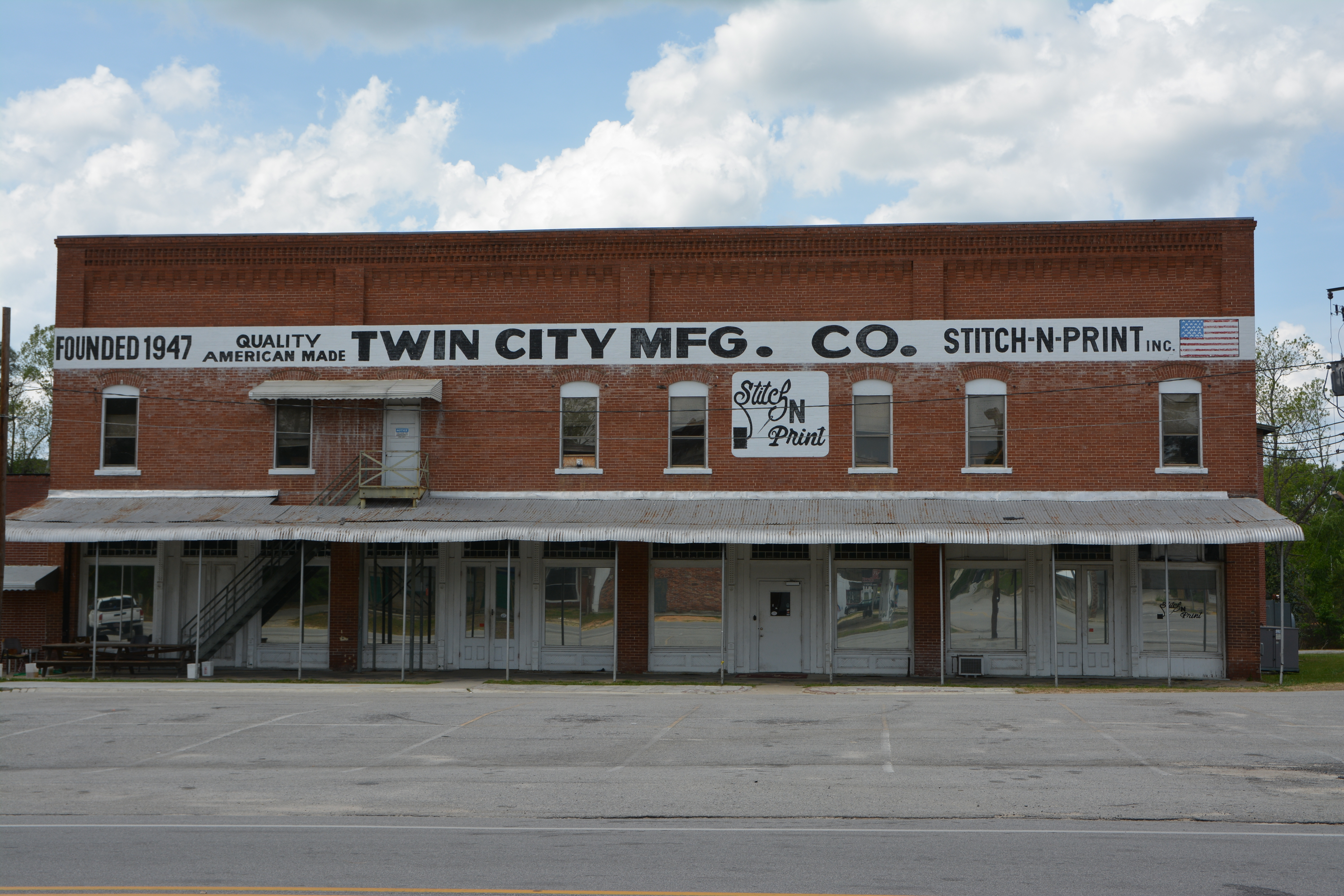
Citizens Trading Company building

The commercial center of Graymont, to the southwest, is centered at Georgia State Route 192 and 5th Avenue, and is south of U.S. Highway 80, and includes:

- Graymont Drugstore (1888), S. Railroad Avenue, one-story brick building with three storefronts.
- livery stable (1900), "a two-story brick building with stepped parapet front fayade, segmental arched windows, and double-door opening" (photo 42)
- Bank of Graymont (1901)
- Citizens Trading Company (1900), two-story brick with corbelled brick cornice, with four storefronts (photo 41)
- Coleman Sanitarium and Hardware Store (1932, rebuilt after fire)
- Graymont Bank and Post Office Building (1901), a two-story brick building with "elaborate corbelled brick cornice and recessed rectangular panels" (photo 39, at right)
- Movie theater (1918) (photo 39, at center)
- Addition to the side of the theater (1938), "originally used as a filling station. It retains its original brick storefront with central multi-pane glass/paneled wood door and multi-light win~ows. The hipped roof entrance is supported by decorative cast-iron square posts made by Fitzgerald Iron Works in Fitzgerald, Georgia (photo 40 at left)"
- Hardware store (1932) (photo 40, at right)

== Graymont residential area ==
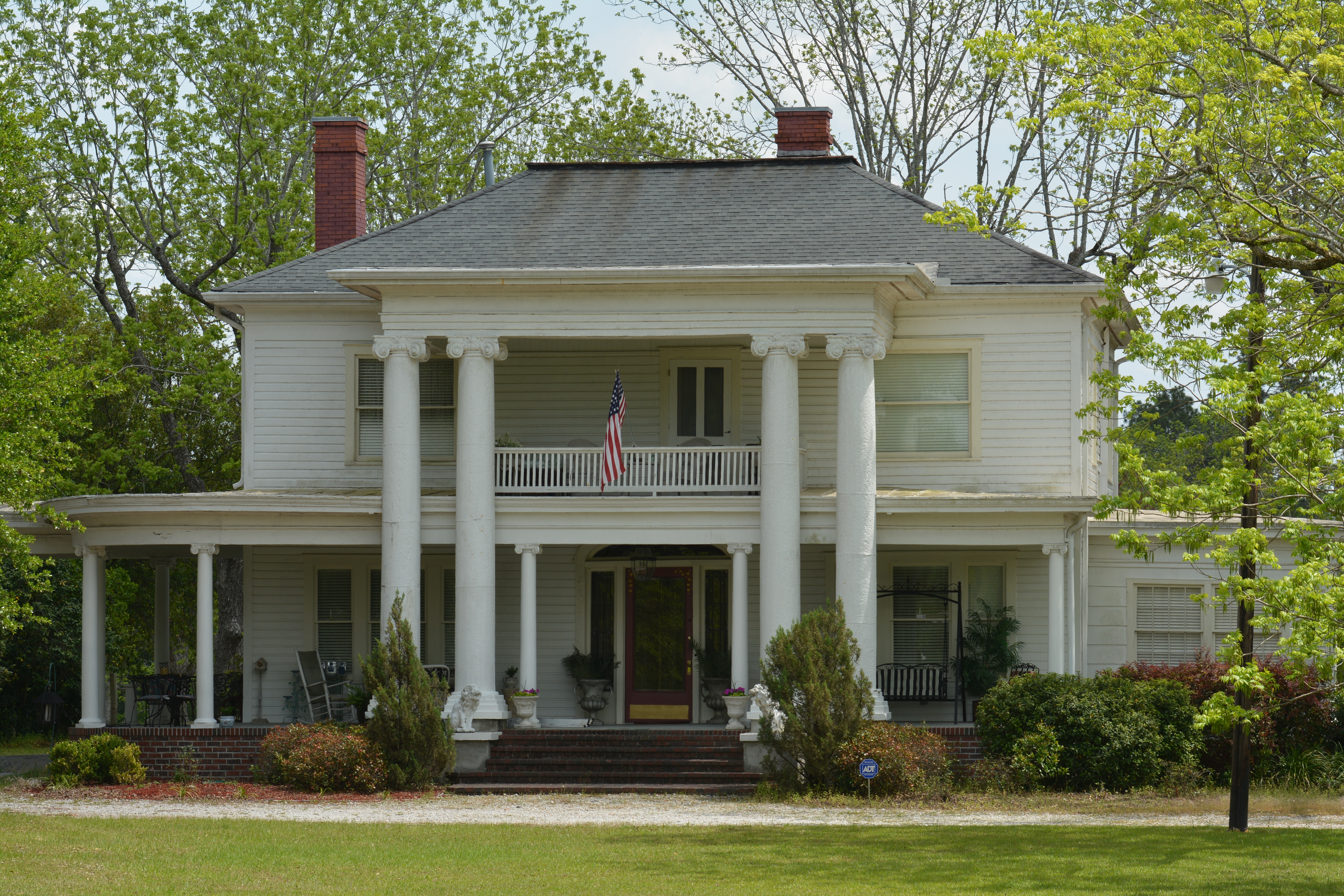
921 5th Ave.
