= Freeman-Brewer-Sawyer House =

Historic house in Illinois, United States

- U.S. National Register of Historic Places
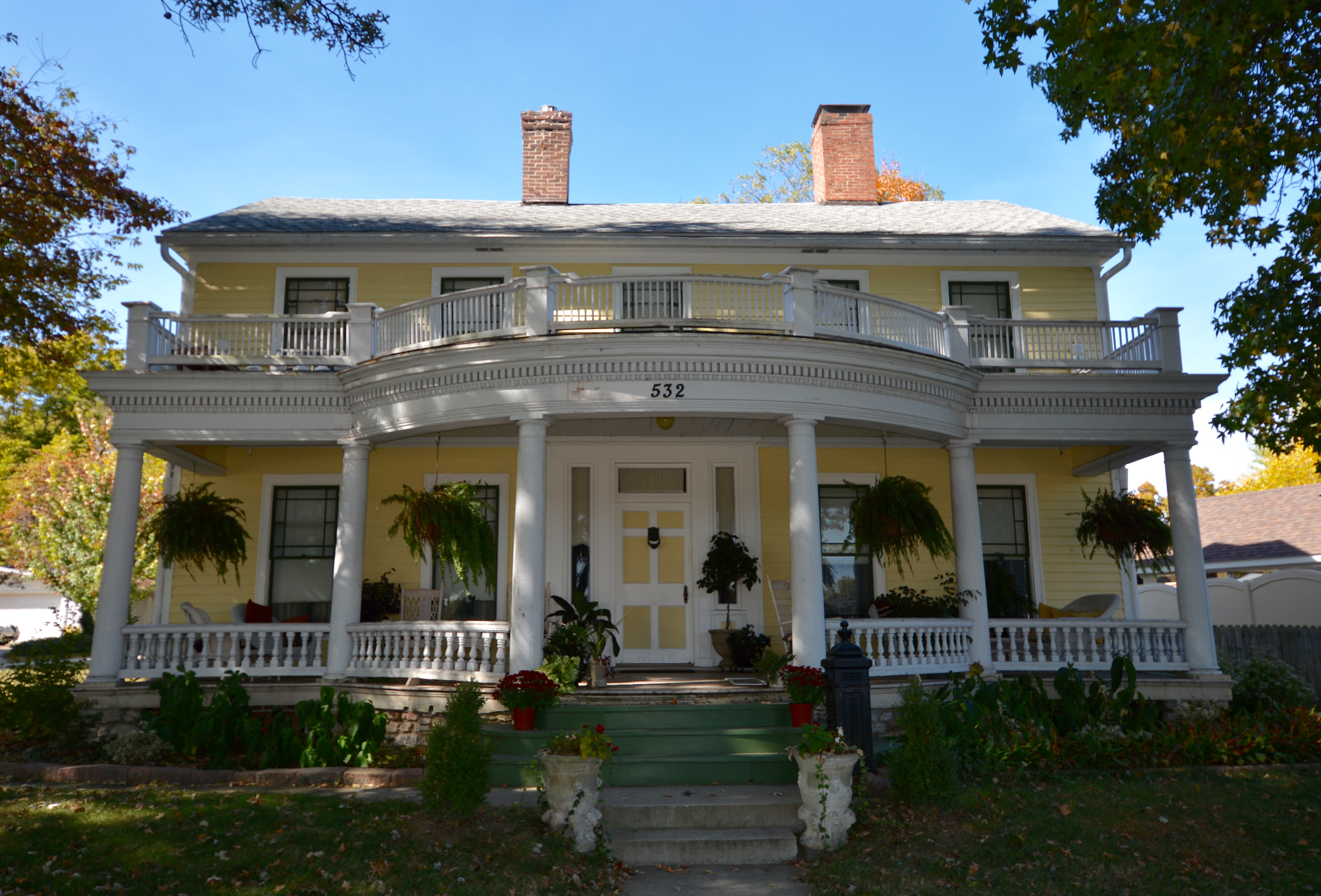

- Location within Illinois Location within the United States
- Location: 532 S. Main St., Hillsboro, Illinois
- Coordinates: 39°9′22″N 89°29′38″W
- Area: less than one acre
- Architectural style: Classical Revival, Greek Revival
- NRHP reference No.: 92001536
- Added to NRHP: November 5, 1992

The Freeman-Brewer-Sawyer House is a historic house in Hillsboro, Illinois. The Greek Revival house was built in 1840, during the height of the style's popularity in the United States. The two-story house features six-over-six windows and a front entrance framed by pilasters, sidelights, and a transom; in addition, it originally had a portico supported by Doric columns. In 1904, the portico was replaced by a Classical Revival porch; the rounded, projecting porch features a balustrade along its roof, egg-and-dart molding, dentillation, and urn-shaped finials.

The house was originally owned by Sally Freeman and her family. In 1849, Judge William Brewer purchased the house, which has remained in his family through at least the 1990s. Brewer's daughter Sarah and her husband A.A.K. Sawyer were responsible for the Classical porch.

The house was added to the National Register of Historic Places on November 5, 1992.
