= Davis-Proctor House =

Historic house in Georgia, United States

- U.S. National Register of Historic Places
- U.S. Historic district – Contributing property
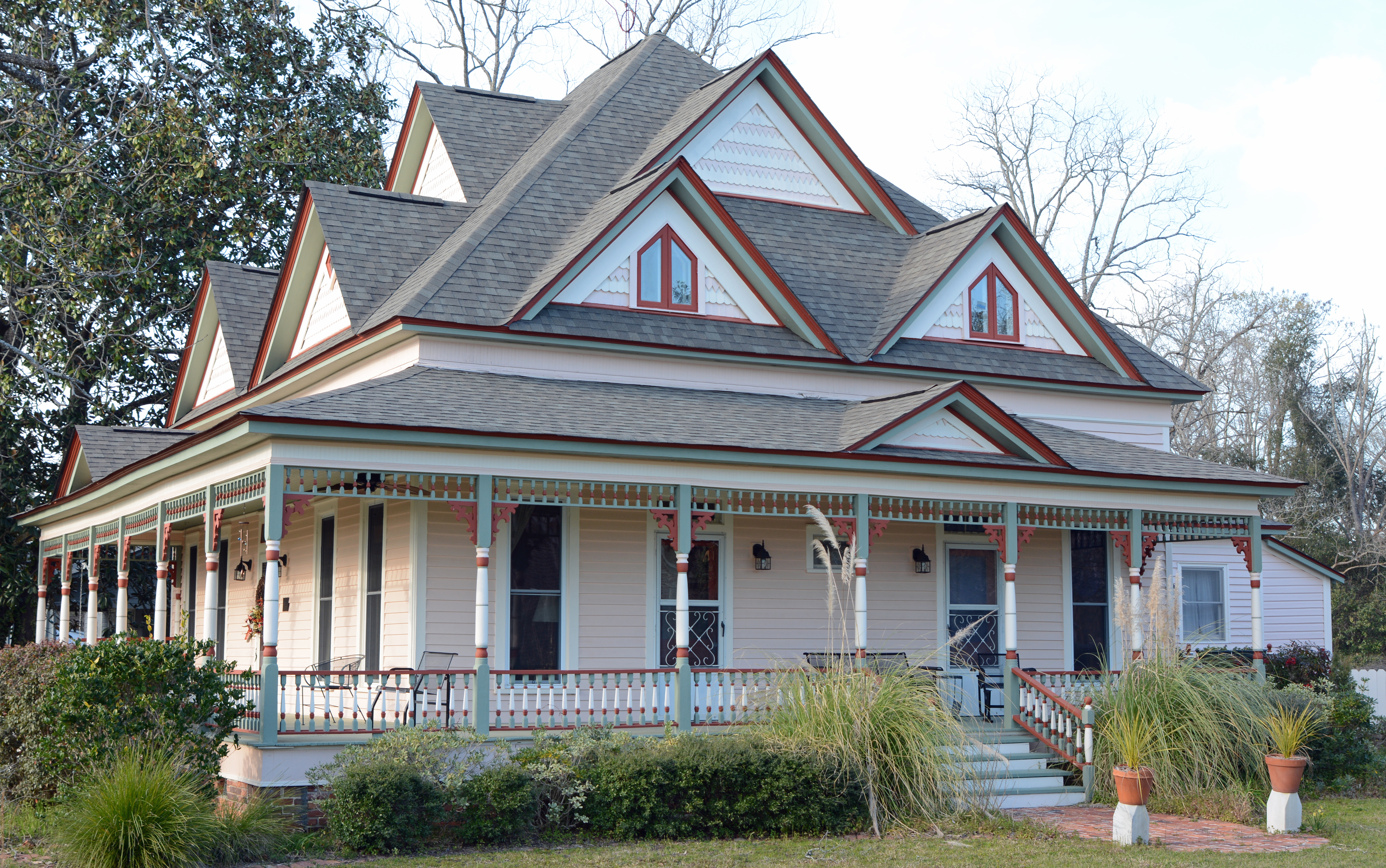

- Location within Georgia Location within the United States
- Location: 133 First Ave., Twin City, Georgia
- Coordinates: 32.58307°N 82.15013°W
- Built: 1890
- Architectural style: Late Victorian
- Part of: Twin City Historic District (ID13001168)
- NRHP reference No.: 10001049

Significant dates
- Added to NRHP: December 20, 2010
- Designated CP: February 8, 2014

The Davis-Proctor House in Twin City in Emanuel County, Georgia is a Late Victorian house built in 1890.

It is a contributing property to the NRHP-listed Twin City Historic District.

It is a one-and-a-half-story frame "Folk Victorian" or Georgian cottage with a wraparound porch with decorative brackets and spindle work, as well as turned posts. It has multiple gables with decorative shingles.
