= Bingham-Brewer House =

Historic house in Maryland

- U.S. National Register of Historic Places
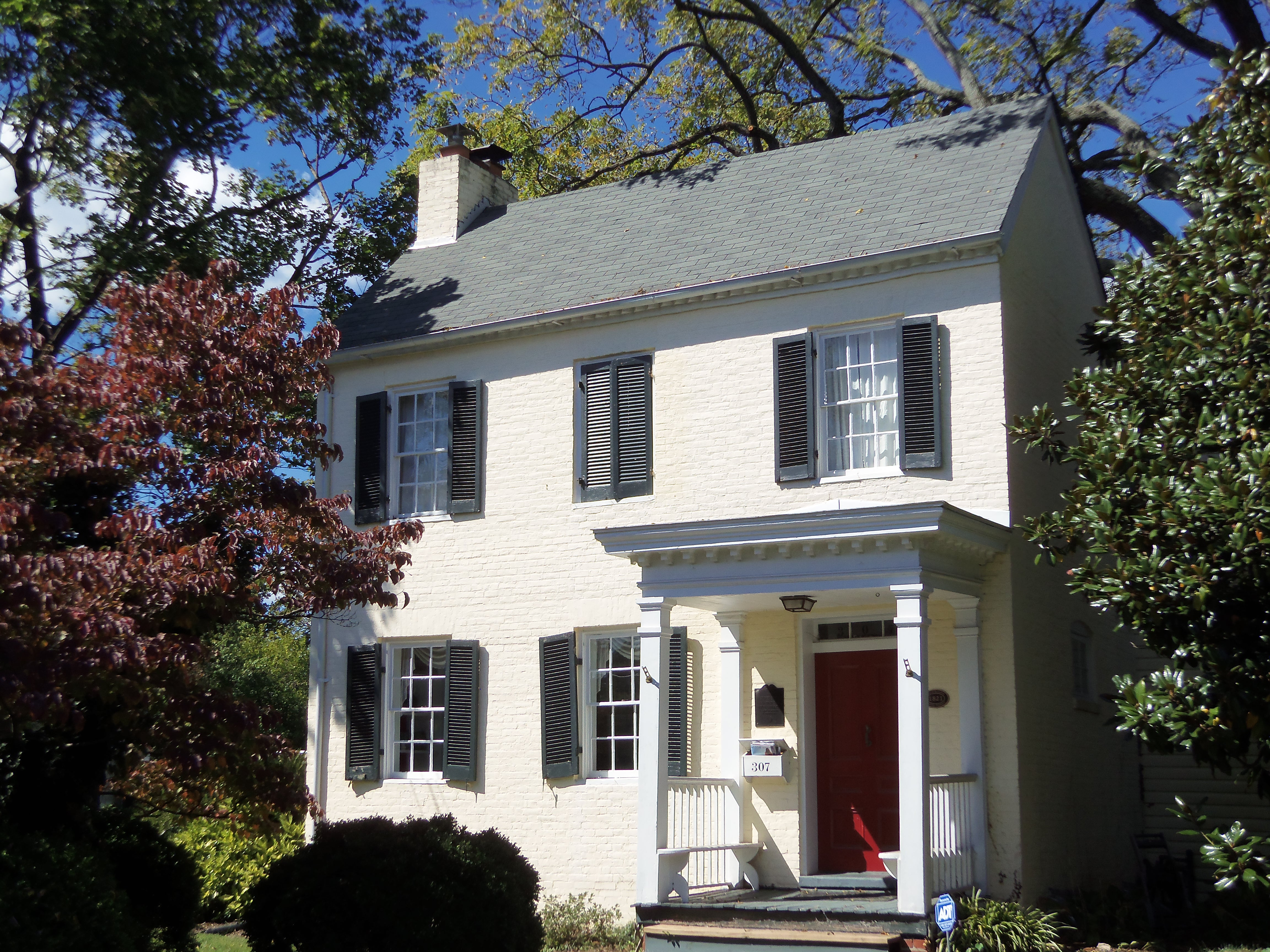
- Bingham-Brewer House, September 2012

- Location within Maryland Location within the United States
- Location: 307 Great Falls Rd., Rockville, Maryland
- Coordinates: 39°4′54.7″N 77°9′37″W
- Area: 0.8 acres (0.32 ha)
- Built: 1821
- Architectural style: Federal
- NRHP reference No.: 80001828
- Added to NRHP: November 24, 1980

The Bingham-Brewer House is a historic home located at Rockville, Montgomery County, Maryland, United States. It is a two-story, Federal-style brick house, with a Flemish bind front facade, dating to 1821. Also on the property is a late-19th century smokehouse, privy, and a late-19th or early-20th century chicken house.

The Bingham-Brewer House was listed on the National Register of Historic Places in 1980.
