= Albert Neal Durden House =

Historic house in Georgia, United States

- U.S. National Register of Historic Places
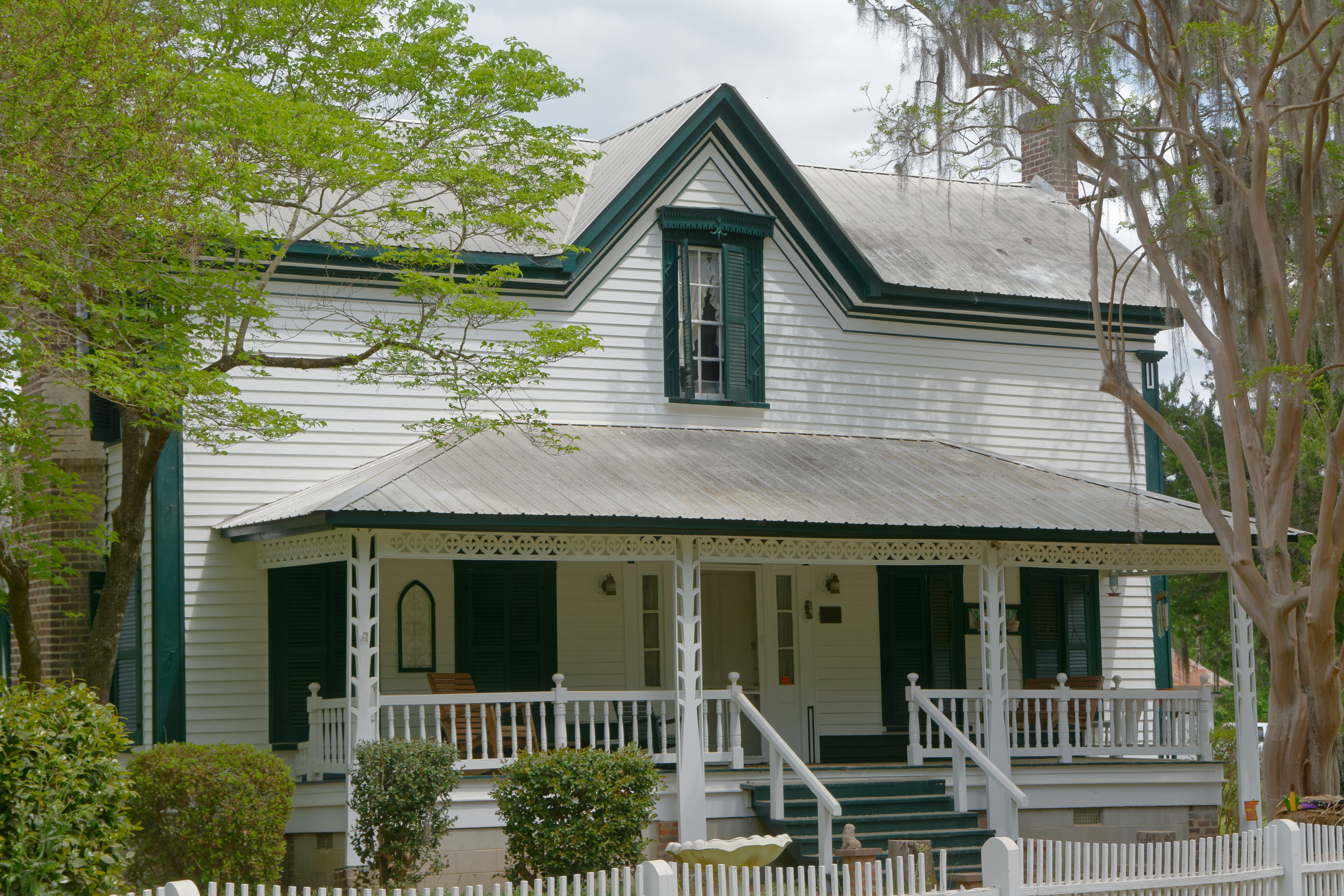
- The house in 2017

- Location within Georgia Location within the United States
- Location: Co. Rd. 360, Twin City, Georgia
- Nearest city: Emanuel, Georgia
- Coordinates: 32.57200°N 82.22389°W
- Area: 162 acres (66 ha)
- Built: c.1855, c.1870
- Built by: Murray, Henry
- Architectural style: Plantation plain
- NRHP reference No.: 90000561
- Added to NRHP: April 20, 1990

The Albert Neal Durden House, also known as the Durden-Brinson-Brewer House, is located in Emanuel County, Georgia near Twin City, Georgia. It was listed on the National Register of Historic Places with three contributing buildings, a contributing structure, and three non-contributing buildings on 162 acres (66 ha) in 1990.

The house consists of a Plantation plain-style house built around 1870, plus a hall-parlor house from the 1850s, joined by an enclosed walkway. It was built to serve as a home for Albert Neal and Eliza Brinson Durden and, up to 1990 had been lived in by descendants. Along with outbuildings, it is on a 162 acres (66 ha) property which was the heart of a larger plantation. The older house was moved to its present location and the newer one was built in front of it.

It is located in a rural area on the old Swainsboro Road (County Road 360) about 3 miles (4.8 km) west of Twin City.
