= Capt. John Brewer House =

Historic house in Massachusetts, United States

- U.S. National Register of Historic Places
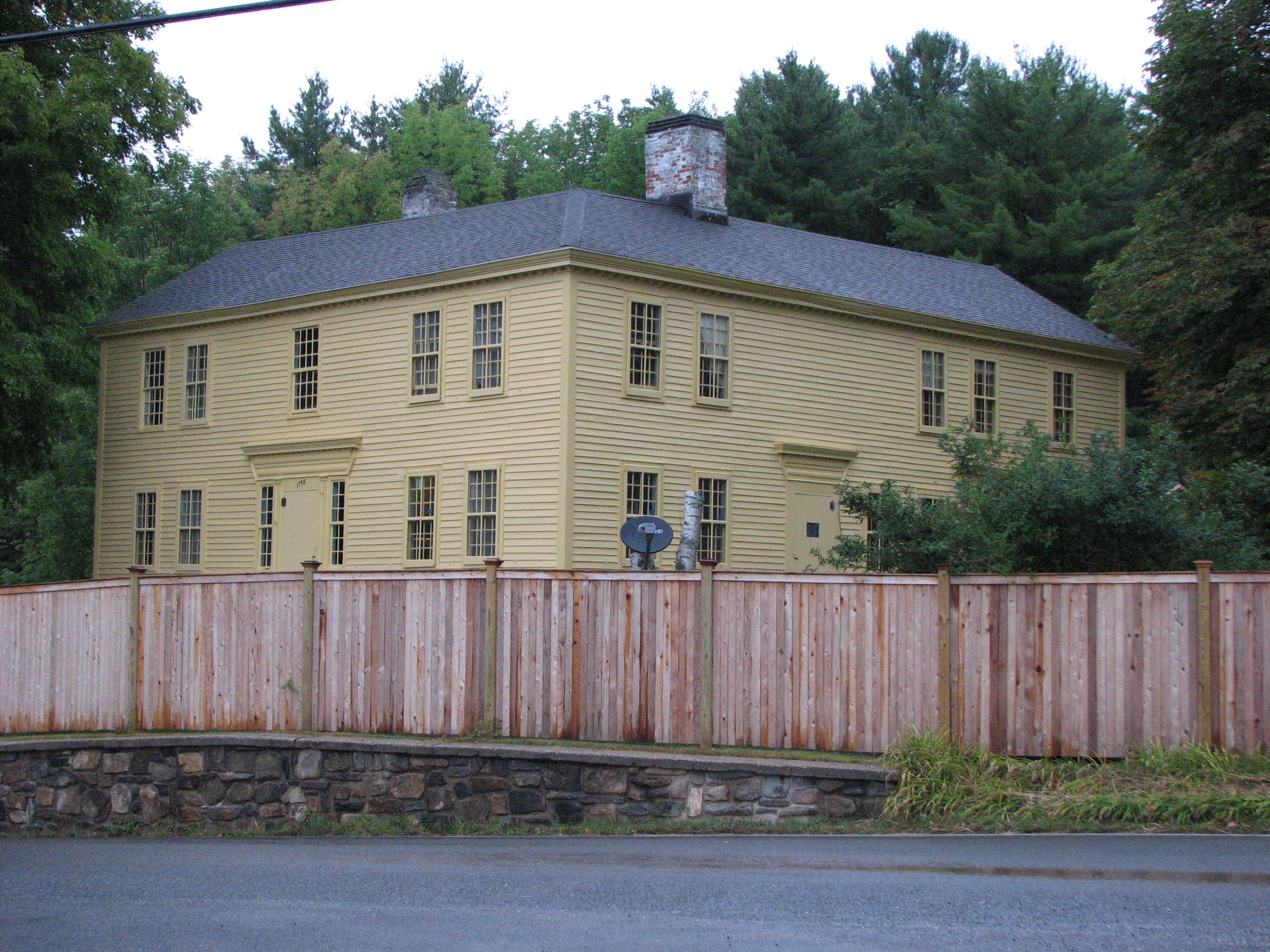

- Location within Massachusetts Location within the United States
- Location: 471 Main St., Monterey, Massachusetts
- Coordinates: 42°10′40″N 73°12′29″W
- Area: 2.1 acres (0.85 ha)
- Built: 1750
- Architect: Brewer, Captain John
- Architectural style: Georgian
- NRHP reference No.: 84002083
- Added to NRHP: March 29, 1984

The Captain John Brewer House is a historic house located at 471 Main Road in Monterey, Massachusetts. The house was built in 1750 by John Brewer, one of the earliest settlers in what is now Monterey, and is a well-preserved example of Georgian architecture. The house was listed on the National Register of Historic Places in 1984.

== Description and history ==
The Captain John Brewer House is located east of the village center of Monterey, on the north side of Main Road (Massachusetts Route 23) at its junction with Sandisfield Road. It is a 2 1/2-story clapboarded wood-frame structure, in an L shape with a cross-gabled roof. Its main facade is oriented south toward the street, with a secondary facade to the east. Both facades are five bays wide, with the main facade symmetrical around center entrance. The entrance is flanked by sidelight windows and pilasters, which rise to a corniced entablature. The eastern facade has windows placed irregularly, with two entrances that have simpler styling but a similar entablature. A modern kitchen ell has been added in the crook of the L.

John Brewer arrived in the area in 1739, responding to an offer from the township owners to establish a mill in exchange for a large land grant. His first house (no longer standing) was likely the first in the town, built on a land grant of 75 acres (30 ha) that includes the present town center. This house, his second, is located closer to the town center, and remained in the family until 1849. The remnants of Brewer's mill still exist near the outflow of Lake Garfield.

== See also ==
- National Register of Historic Places listings in Berkshire County, Massachusetts
