= Swainsboro Light and Water Plant =

- U.S. National Register of Historic Places
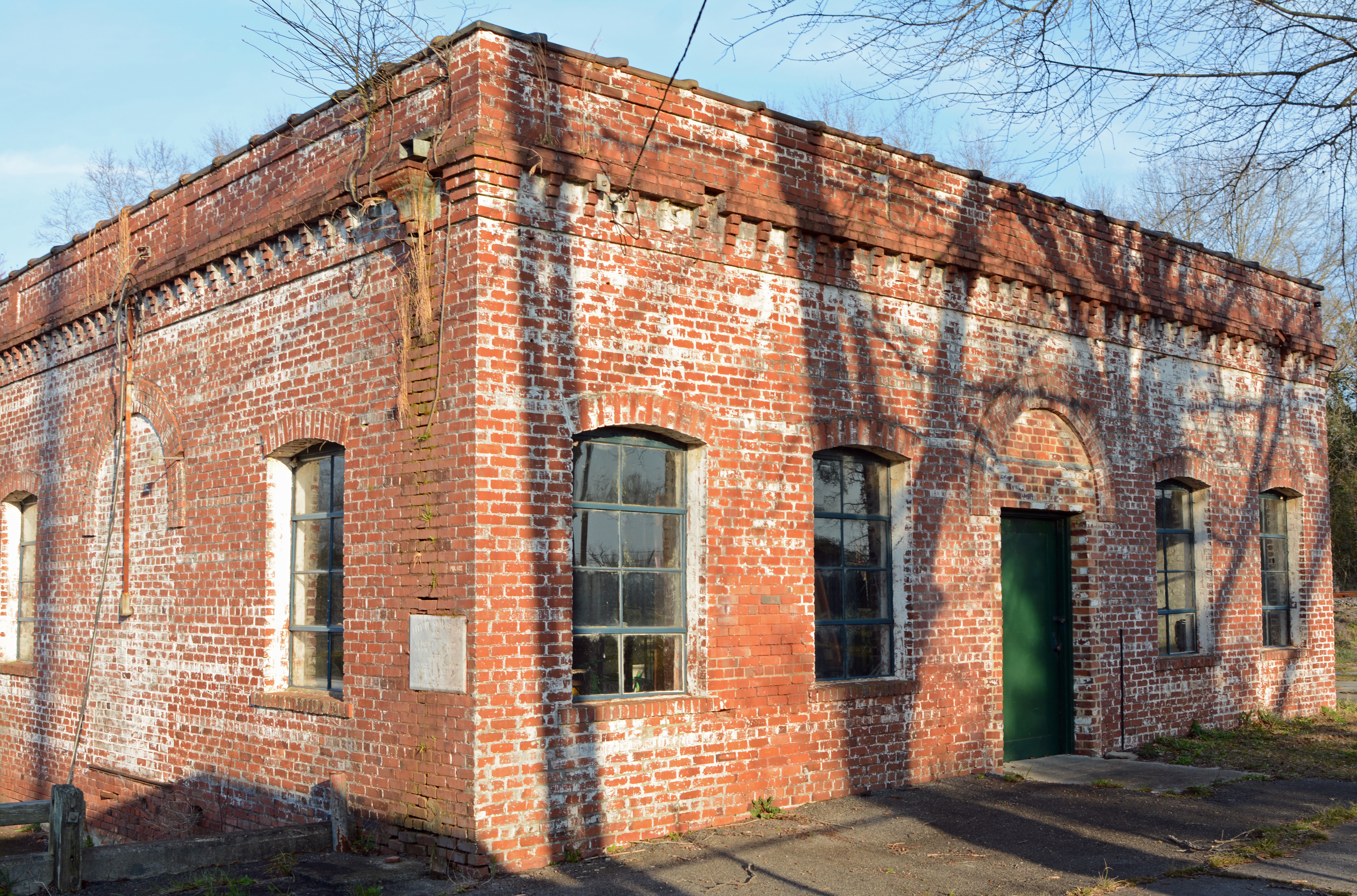
- The Light and Water Plant building

- Location within Georgia Location within the United States
- Location: Bounded by East Moring and South Coleman Sts. and the Norfolk Southern Railway, Swainsboro, Georgia
- Coordinates: 32.59665°N 82.33111°W
- Area: less than one acre
- Built: 1921
- Built by: J.B. McCrary Engineering Co.
- Architectural style: Early 20th century
- NRHP reference No.: 04001184
- Added to NRHP: October 27, 2004

The Swainsboro Light and Water Plant in Swainsboro in Emanuel County, Georgia was listed on the National Register of Historic Places in 2004. The listing included three contributing buildings and three contributing structures.

The power plant building was built in 1922.
