= Moses Brewer House =

Historic house in Massachusetts, United States

- U.S. National Register of Historic Places
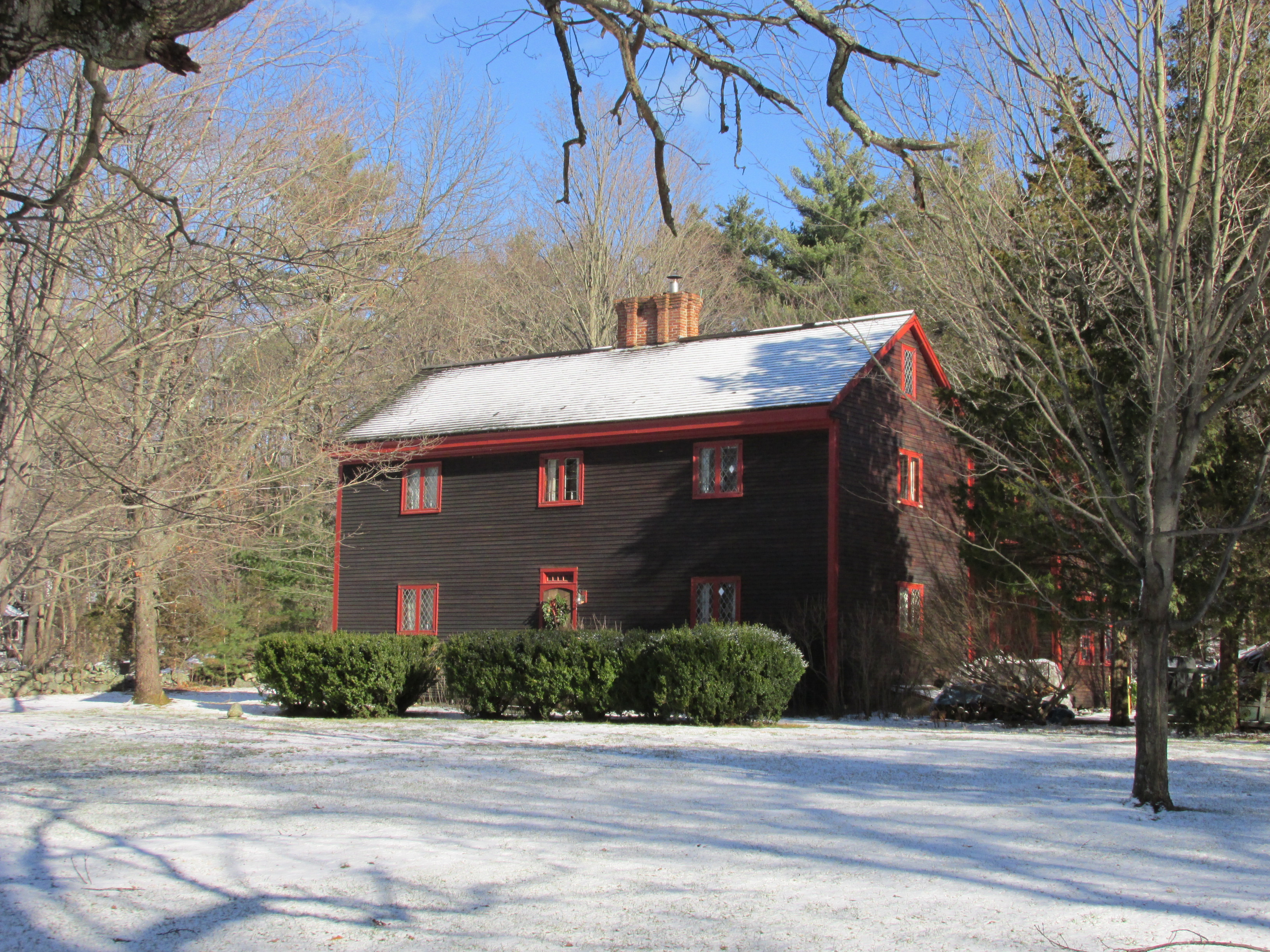

- Location within Massachusetts Location within the United States
- Location: 88 Concord Road, Sudbury, Massachusetts
- Coordinates: 42°22′3″N 71°24′52″W
- Built: 1720
- Architectural style: Colonial
- MPS: First Period Buildings of Eastern Massachusetts TR
- NRHP reference No.: 90000184
- Added to NRHP: March 9, 1990

The Moses Brewer House (also known as the Goulding House) is a historic late First Period house located in Sudbury, Massachusetts.

== Description and history ==
The oldest portion of this 2 1/2-story timber-framed house was built c. 1720–1730, and was apparently moved to its present site from its original location in Wayland sometime in the 18th century. It probably began as a "two cell" house (five bays wide and one deep) with central chimney, to which the rear leanto and a "Beverly jog" (a leanto portion that extends beyond the side of the house) were added later. The house underwent a major restoration in the 1920s. It has an original dog-leg staircase that ascends all the way into the attic, a relative rarity.

The house was listed on the National Register of Historic Places on March 9, 1990.

== See also ==
- National Register of Historic Places listings in Middlesex County, Massachusetts
