= Proctor Maple Research Center =

- Proctor Maple Research Farm
- U.S. National Register of Historic Places
- Location within Vermont Location within the United States
- Location: 58 Harvey Rd., Underhill, Vermont
- Coordinates: 44°31′37″N 72°51′57″W
- Area: 50 acres (20 ha)
- Built: 1947
- Architectural style: Sugarhouse
- NRHP reference No.: 99001050
- Added to NRHP: September 13, 1999

The Proctor Maple Research Center is an agricultural research center of the University of Vermont specializing in the study of maples, particularly with respect to the production of sap, which is notably transformed into maple syrup. It is the only facility of this type in the United States. Its facilities are located on Harvey Road in Underhill, Vermont, on a rural property previously known as the Harvey Farm, given to the state in 1946 by Governor of Vermont Mortimer Proctor. The center's early facilities and century-old sugar bush are listed on the National Register of Historic Places.

== Setting ==
The Proctor Maple Research Center is located on 180 acres (73 ha) of land on the western slope of Mount Mansfield. The facilities of the center are located on a spur road off Harvey Road, and its actively managed stand of sugar maples is located north of its small cluster of buildings. Its main laboratory building was built in 1988 and expanded in 1994. Nearby stands the center's current sugar house, built in 1992–93, as well as its original sugar house, built in 1947.

== History ==
Since at least the second half of the 19th century, this property was used as a sugar bush, or property actively managed for the production of maple sap from sugar maples. It was purchased by the Harvey family in 1873, whose uses of the land included sugarmaking. The property was acquired by Mortimer Proctor, then the Governor of Vermont, and was given by him to the state to further its research into a product that was important to the state's economy. The early field station was little more than a sugar house, mounted on skids until a suitable permanent site was located. A laboratory was added in the mid-1960s, which burned down in the 1980s.

== See also ==
- National Register of Historic Places listings in Chittenden County, Vermont
