= Adrian Brewer Studio =

Historic house in Arkansas, United States

- U.S. National Register of Historic Places
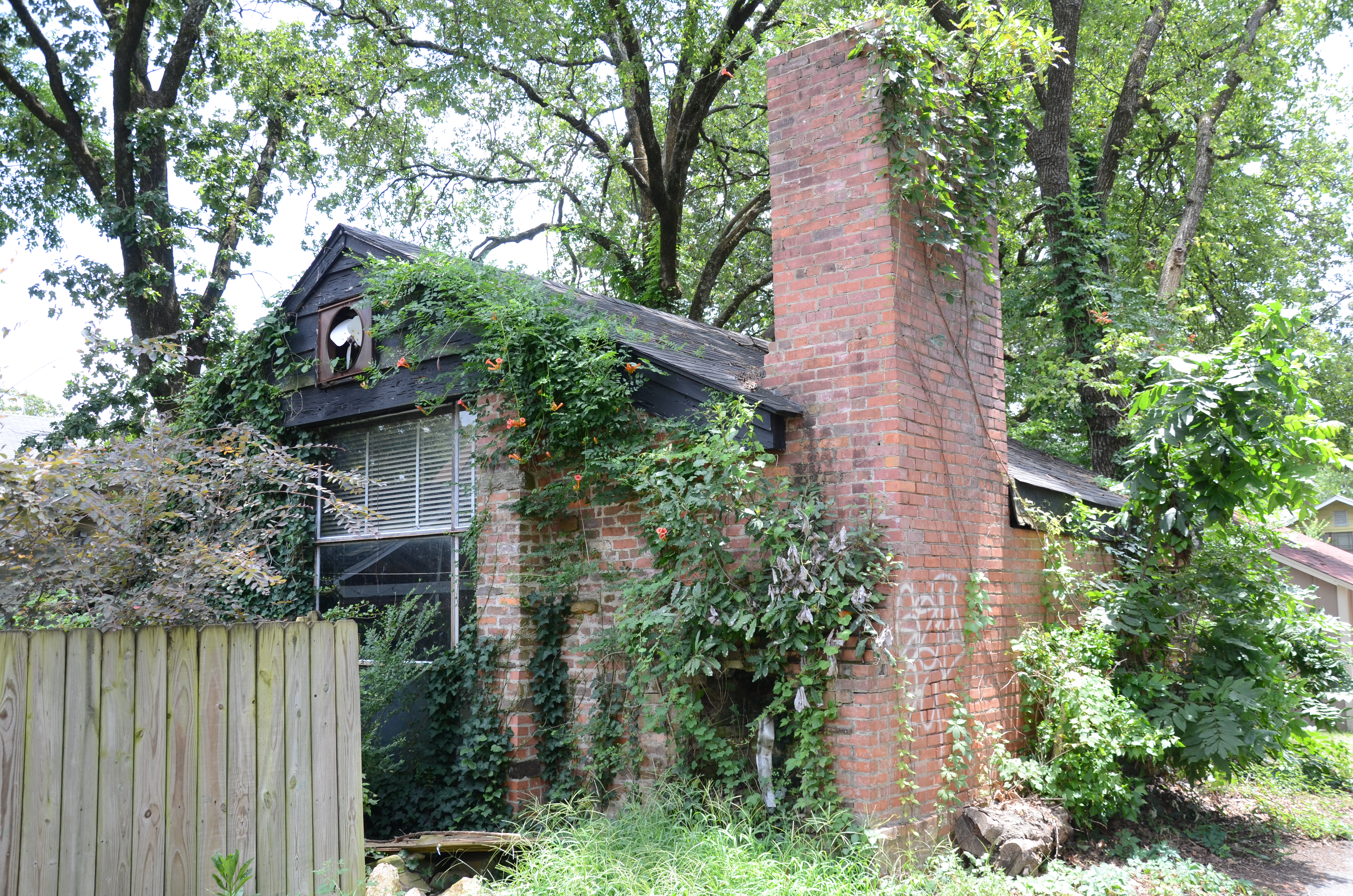

- Location within Arkansas Location within the United States
- Location: 510 Cedar St., Little Rock, Arkansas
- Coordinates: 34°45′25″N 92°19′1″W
- Area: 0.2 acres (0.081 ha)
- Built: 1945
- Architect: Max Mayer, George Trapp
- Architectural style: Bungalow/craftsman, Moderne
- NRHP reference No.: 00000069
- Added to NRHP: February 10, 2000

The Adrian Brewer Studio is a historic artist's studio at 510 Cedar Street in Little Rock, Arkansas. It is an architectural blend of Moderne and Arts and Crafts styling, designed in collaboration by Max Mayer and George Trapp and built in 1945 for one of Arkansas' leading artists of the period, Adrian Brewer. The building features masonry construction with heavy wooden timber elements, an entrance trellis made out of repurposed railroad ties, and a door made of pecky cypress wood. The studio is the only major surviving space associated with the artist.

The building was listed on the National Register of Historic Places in 2000.

== See also ==
- National Register of Historic Places listings in Little Rock, Arkansas
