= John Proctor House (Westford, Massachusetts) =

Historic house in Massachusetts, United States

- U.S. National Register of Historic Places
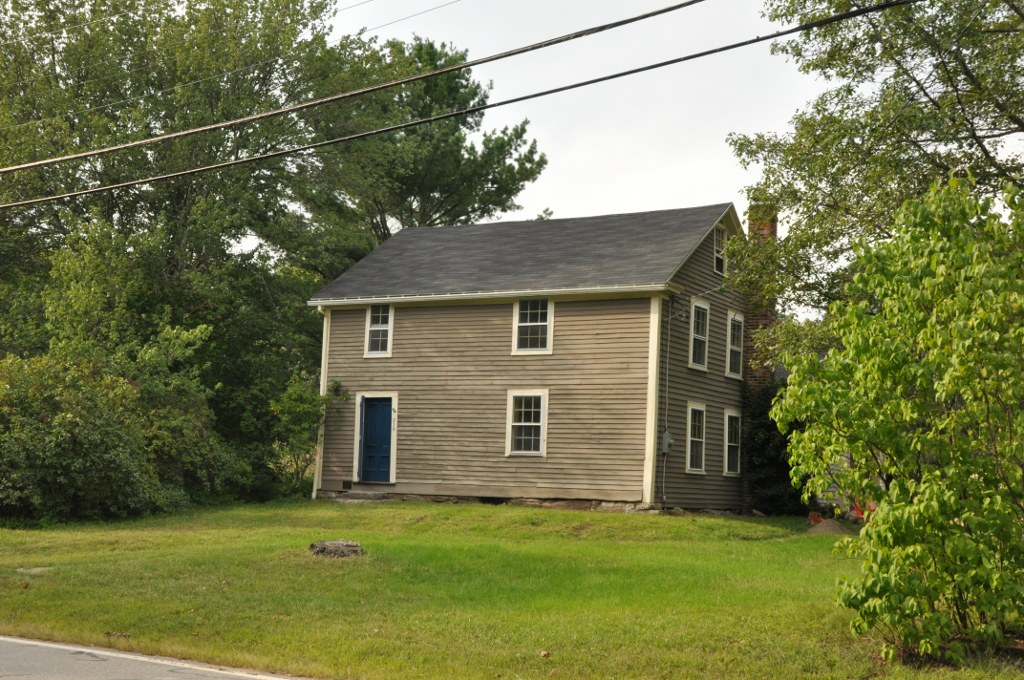

- Location within Massachusetts Location within the United States
- Location: Westford, Massachusetts
- Coordinates: 42°33′7″N 71°25′44″W
- Architect: Proctor, John
- Architectural style: Georgian vernacular
- NRHP reference No.: 93000010
- Added to NRHP: February 4, 1993

The John Proctor House is a historic house at 218 Concord Road in Westford, Massachusetts. It is one of the oldest houses in Westford. Its main block was probably built between 1720 and 1740 by John Proctor II, although deed evidence surrounding the house's construction is scanty. The main house is a two-story timber-frame structure with an asymmetrical facade, somewhat resembling a typical First Period half house (a two-story single-chamber block with a chimney on one side), although the chimney was removed in the 19th century. Most of the building's interior finishes date to the 1820s or 1830s. A two-story bay was added to the house's west side between 1830 and 1850, and a real ell added c. 1900.

The house was listed on the National Register of Historic Places in 1993.

== See also ==
- Henry Fletcher House, 224 Concord Road
- National Register of Historic Places listings in Middlesex County, Massachusetts
