= William Proctor House (Arlington, Massachusetts) =

Historic house in Massachusetts, United States

- U.S. National Register of Historic Places
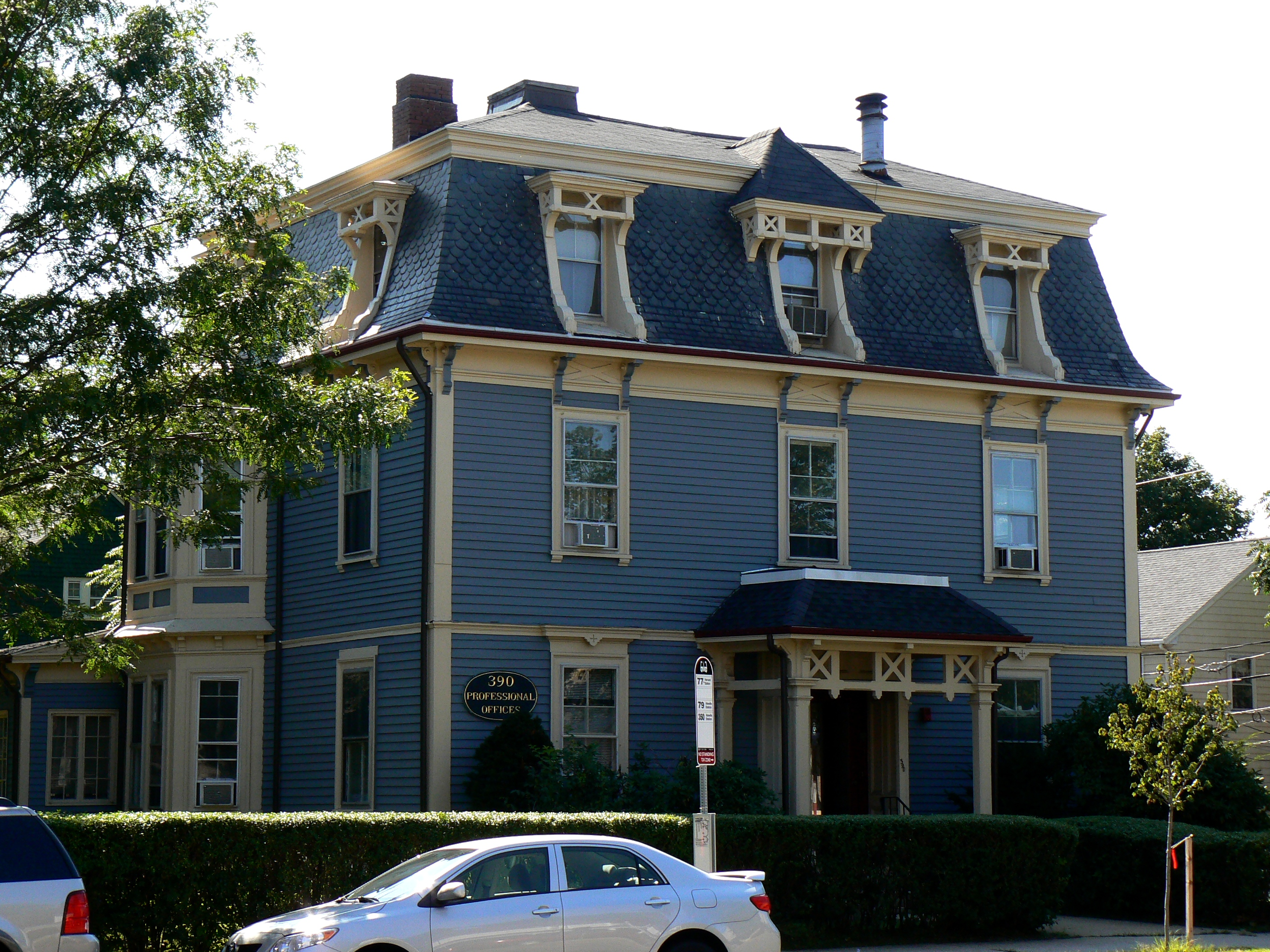
- A photo of the house, taken in 2008

- Location within Massachusetts Location within the United States
- Location: 390 Massachusetts Avenue, Arlington, Massachusetts
- Coordinates: 42°24′46.8″N 71°08′59.2″W
- Built: 1870
- Architectural style: Second Empire
- MPS: Arlington MRA
- NRHP reference No.: 85001041
- Added to NRHP: April 18, 1985

The William Proctor House is a historic house in Arlington, Massachusetts. The 2.5-story wood-frame house was built c. 1870, and is a rare local example of Second Empire styling. The house was owned for many years by William Proctor, a bank teller who commuted to work in Boston. Proctor's son, also named William, was a principal in the architectural firm of Gay & Proctor, which designed a number of Arlington landmarks.

The house was listed on the National Register of Historic Places in 1985. It now houses professional offices.

== See also ==
- National Register of Historic Places listings in Arlington, Massachusetts
