= Canoochee, Georgia =

- Unincorporated community Census-designated place
- Location within Georgia
- Coordinates: 32°40′20″N 82°10′44″W
- Country: United States
- State: Georgia
- County: Emanuel

Area
  - Total: 2.41 sq mi (6.23 km^{2})
  - Land: 2.36 sq mi (6.11 km^{2})
  - Water: 0.046 sq mi (0.12 km^{2})
- Elevation: 377 ft (115 m)

Population (2020)
  - Total: 70
  - Density: 30/sq mi (11/km^{2})
- Time zone: UTC-5 (Eastern (EST))
  - Summer (DST): UTC-4 (EDT)
- Area code: 478
- GNIS feature ID: 2587027

Canoochee is an unincorporated community and census-designated place (CDP) in Emanuel County, Georgia, United States. Its population was 70 as of the 2020 census.

Georgia State Route 192 passes through the community.

== Demographics ==
Historical population
Census	Pop.	Note	%±
2010	71		—
2020	70		−1.4%
U.S. Decennial Census; 1850-1870 1870-1880; 1890-1910 1920-1930; 1940 1950 1960; 1970 1980 1990; 2000 2010 2020

Canoochee was first listed as a CDP in the 2010 census.

Canoochee CDP, Georgia – Racial and ethnic composition Note: the US Census treats Hispanic/Latino as an ethnic category. This table excludes Latinos from the racial categories and assigns them to a separate category. Hispanics/Latinos may be of any race.
Race / Ethnicity (NH = Non-Hispanic)	Pop 2010	Pop 2020	% 2010	% 2020
White alone (NH)	54	59	76.06%	84.29%
Black or African American alone (NH)	16	9	22.54%	12.86%
Native American or Alaska Native alone (NH)	0	0	0.00%	0.00%
Asian alone (NH)	1	0	1.41%	0.00%
Pacific Islander alone (NH)	0	0	0.00%	0.00%
Some Other Race alone (NH)	0	0	0.00%	0.00%
Mixed Race or Multi-Racial (NH)	0	2	0.00%	2.86%
Hispanic or Latino (any race)	0	0	0.00%	0.00%
Total	71	70	100.00%	100.00%

== History ==
Linguist William Bright believes "Canoochee" may be a name derived from the Muscogee language, meaning "little ground". The Georgia General Assembly incorporated the place as the "Town of Canoochee" in 1912, with town corporate limits extending in a one-half mile radius from the Savannah and Statesboro Railway depot. The town's charter was officially dissolved in 1995.
