= John Proctor House (Peabody, Massachusetts) =

Historic house in Massachusetts, United States

- U.S. National Register of Historic Places
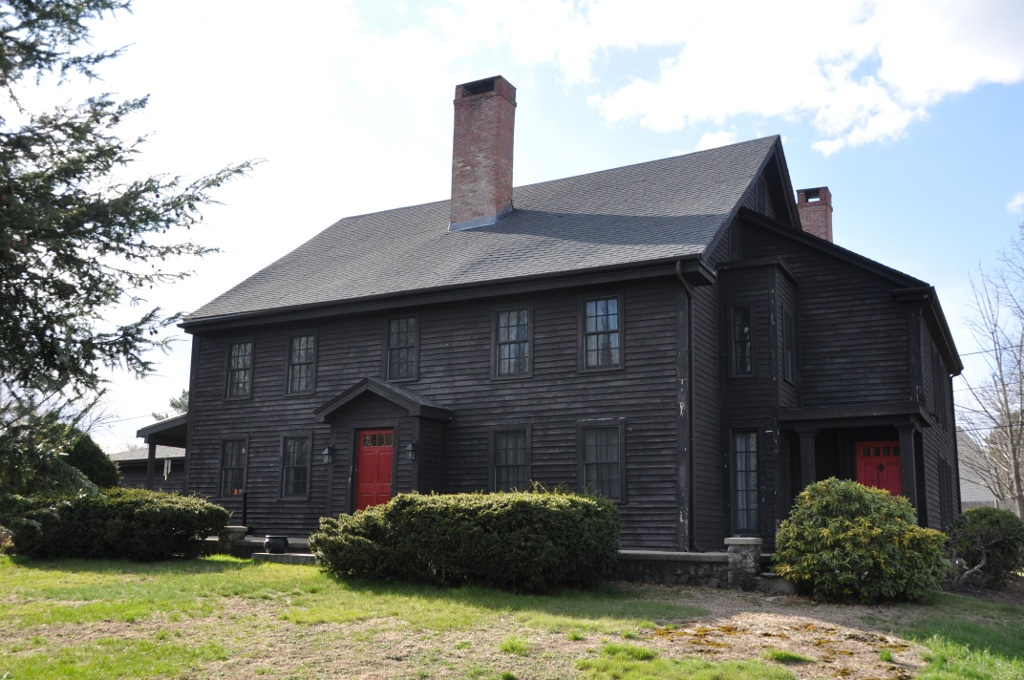

- Location within Massachusetts Location within the United States
- Location: 348 Lowell Street, Peabody, Massachusetts
- Coordinates: 42°32′1″N 70°57′16″W
- Built: c. 1727
- Architectural style: Colonial
- MPS: First Period Buildings of Eastern Massachusetts
- NRHP reference No.: 90000253
- Added to NRHP: March 9, 1990

The John Proctor House is a historic First Period house in Peabody, Massachusetts, United States. According to local tradition, this wood-frame house was occupied by John Proctor, who was convicted and hanged for witchcraft during the Salem witch trials of 1692. However, dendrochronology has determined the house was built c. 1727 by Proctor's son Thorndike, who purchased the property from Charles Downing around that time. The house remained in the Proctor family into the mid-19th century.

The house was listed on the National Register of Historic Places in 1990. It is not open to the public.

== See also ==
- List of the oldest buildings in Massachusetts
- National Register of Historic Places listings in Essex County, Massachusetts
