= Twin City, Georgia =

- City
- Location in Emanuel County and the state of Georgia
- Coordinates: 32°34′50″N 82°9′28″W
- Country: United States
- State: Georgia
- County: Emanuel

Area
  - Total: 3.61 sq mi (9.36 km^{2})
  - Land: 3.58 sq mi (9.26 km^{2})
  - Water: 0.039 sq mi (0.10 km^{2})
- Elevation: 308 ft (94 m)

Population (2020)
  - Total: 1,642
  - Density: 459/sq mi (177.4/km^{2})
- Time zone: UTC-5 (Eastern (EST))
  - Summer (DST): UTC-4 (EDT)
- ZIP code: 30471
- Area code: 478
- FIPS code: 13-77988
- GNIS feature ID: 0356602
- Website: https://www.twincityga.com

Twin City, formerly known as Graymont, is a city in Emanuel County, Georgia, United States. As of the 2020 census, the city had a population of 1,642.

== History ==
Twin City gets its name from the combining of two adjacent towns, Graymont and Summit. The two rival towns were merged in 1924 as Twin City.

Of Twin City's 3.6 square miles (9.3 km^{2}) area, 255 acres (1.03 km^{2}) is included in the Twin City Historic District, listed on the National Register of Historic Places. This includes the historic jail and former city hall building

== Geography ==
Twin City is located in eastern Emanuel County at 32°34′50″N 82°9′28″W (32.580420, -82.157776). U.S. Route 80 passes through the city, leading west 11 miles (18 km) to Swainsboro, the county seat, and east 25 miles (40 km) to Statesboro.

According to the United States Census Bureau, Twin City has a total area of 3.6 square miles (9.4 km^{2}), of which 0.04 square miles (0.1 km^{2}), or 1.12%, is water.

== Demographics ==
Historical population
Census	Pop.	Note	%±
1930	901		—
1940	1,019		13.1%
1950	1,018		−0.1%
1960	1,095		7.6%
1970	1,119		2.2%
1980	1,402		25.3%
1990	1,466		4.6%
2000	1,752		19.5%
2010	1,742		−0.6%
2020	1,642		−5.7%
U.S. Decennial Census; 1850-1870 1870-1880; 1890-1910 1920-1930; 1940 1950 1960; 1970 1980 1990; 2000 2010

=== 2020 census ===
As of the 2020 census, Twin City had a population of 1,642. There were 333 families residing in the city. The median age was 40.2 years. 19.6% of residents were under the age of 18 and 17.5% of residents were 65 years of age or older. For every 100 females there were 139.7 males, and for every 100 females age 18 and over there were 147.7 males age 18 and over.

0.0% of residents lived in urban areas, while 100.0% lived in rural areas.

There were 503 households in Twin City, of which 30.2% had children under the age of 18 living in them. Of all households, 33.0% were married-couple households, 22.7% were households with a male householder and no spouse or partner present, and 38.4% were households with a female householder and no spouse or partner present. About 35.2% of all households were made up of individuals and 17.1% had someone living alone who was 65 years of age or older.

There were 637 housing units, of which 21.0% were vacant. The homeowner vacancy rate was 2.1% and the rental vacancy rate was 7.8%.

Twin City racial composition as of 2020
Race	Num.	Perc.
White (non-Hispanic)	811	49.39%
Black or African American (non-Hispanic)	765	46.59%
Native American	1	0.06%
Asian	2	0.12%
Other/Mixed	23	1.4%
Hispanic or Latino	40	2.44%

== Attractions ==
George L. Smith State Park is located in Emanuel County, and is known for its Parrish Mill and Pond, a combination grist mill, saw mill, covered bridge and dam built in 1880 and now open for tours. Anglers and canoeists can explore the mill pond dotted with Spanish moss-draped trees and home to blue heron and white ibis. Hikers can walk seven miles of trails while searching for gopher tortoises, Georgia's state reptile.

== Notable people ==
- Johnny Archer, professional pool player
- Ginny Wright, country music singer
- David Durden, NATIONAL FOOTBALL LEAGUE athlete (team Dallas cowboys)
