= National Register of Historic Places listings in Twiggs County, Georgia =

This is a list of properties and districts in Twiggs County, Georgia that are listed on the National Register of Historic Places (NRHP).

This National Park Service list is complete through NPS recent listings posted March 21, 2025.

== Current listings ==
	Name on the Register	Image	Date listed	Location	City or town	Description
1	Bullard-Everett Farm Historic District		January 15, 1998 (#97001648)	Address Restricted	Jeffersonville	
2	John Chapman Plantation	John Chapman Plantation	August 11, 1982 (#82002491)	SE of Jeffersonville on GA 96 (address is 1286 as of 2017); 32°40′45″N 83°18′48″W	Jeffersonville	
3	Myrick's Mill	Myrick's Mill	December 6, 1975 (#75000613)	NE of Fitzpatrick on county road 378; 32°47′02″N 83°22′05″W	Fitzpatrick	Historical marker at 32.79483°N 83.37250°W
4	The Pines	The Pines	January 25, 2021 (#100006053)	213 Shannon Dr. 32°41′06″N 83°20′45″W	Jeffersonville	
5	Richland Baptist Church	Richland Baptist Church	June 22, 1982 (#82002492)	Richland Rd. 32°37′50″N 83°24′02″W	Jeffersonville	
6	Twiggs County Courthouse	Twiggs County Courthouse	September 18, 1980 (#80001248)	Courthouse Sq. 32°41′15″N 83°20′45″W	Jeffersonville	Built 1902-04, later expanded (between 1980 and 2015)
7	Wimberly Plantation	Wimberly Plantation	June 17, 1982 (#82002493)	Jeffersonville Rd., GA 96; 32°38′18″N 83°22′04″W	Jeffersonville	
