= Darqueze Dennard =

American football player (born 1991)

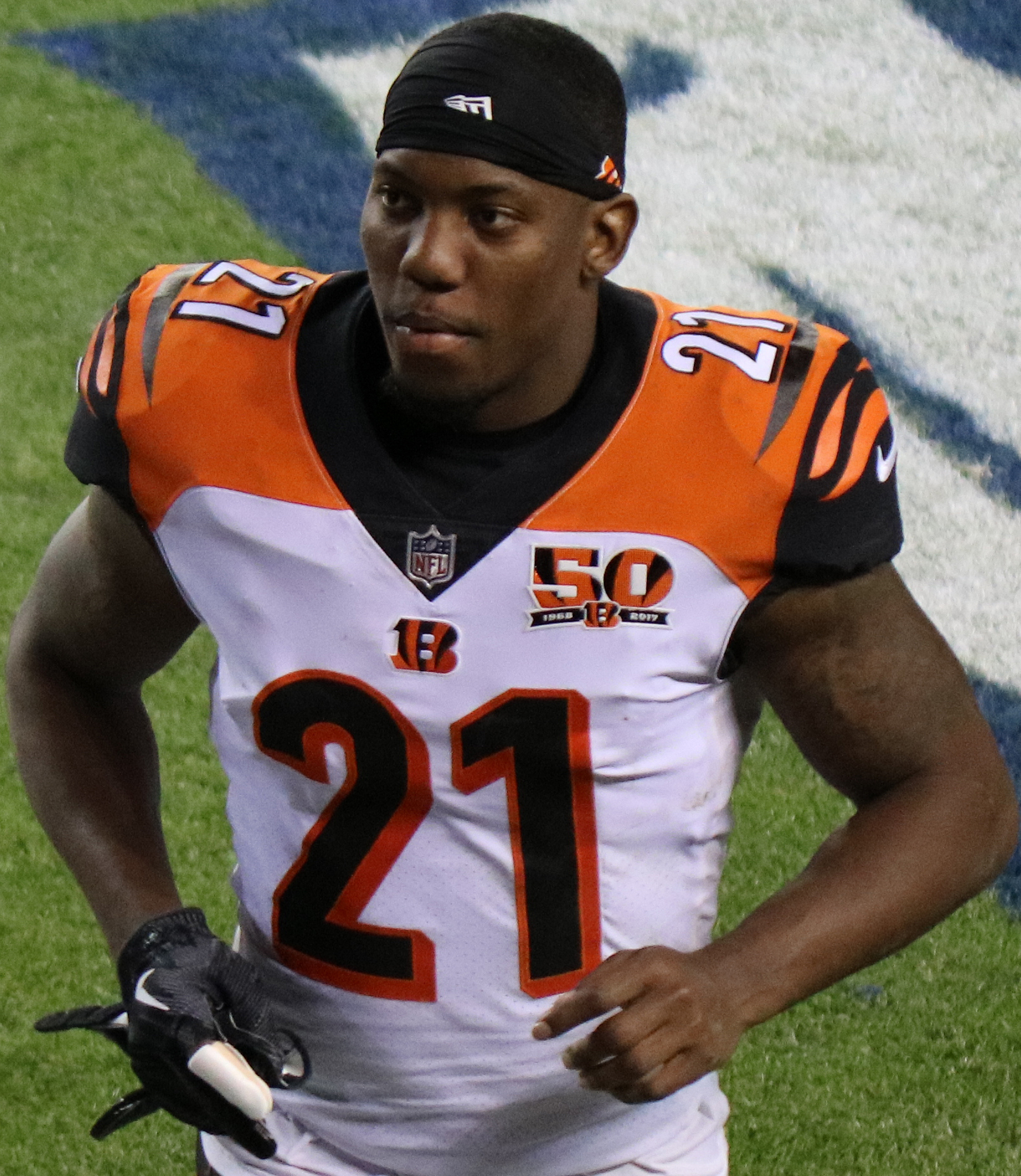
- Dennard with the Cincinnati Bengals in 2017

No. 21, 34, 35, 43
- Position: Cornerback

Personal information
- Born: October 10, 1991 (age 35); Dry Branch, Georgia, U.S.
- Listed height: 5 ft 11 in (1.80 m)
- Listed weight: 205 lb (93 kg)

Career information
- High school: Twiggs County (Jeffersonville, Georgia)
- College: Michigan State (2010–2013)
- NFL draft: 2014: 1st round, 24th overall pick

Career history
- Cincinnati Bengals (2014–2019); Atlanta Falcons (2020); Arizona Cardinals (2021)*; Indianapolis Colts (2021)*; New York Giants (2021); San Francisco 49ers (2021)
- * Offseason or practice squad member only

Awards and highlights
- Jack Tatum Trophy (2013); Jim Thorpe Award (2013); Unanimous All-American (2013); Big Ten Defensive Back of the Year (2013); 2× First-team All-Big Ten (2012, 2013)

Career NFL statistics
- Total tackles: 313
- Sacks: 3.0
- Forced fumbles: 3
- Pass deflections: 27
- Interceptions: 4
- Defensive touchdowns: 1
- Stats at Pro Football Reference

Darqueze Derrell Dennard (born October 10, 1991) is an American former professional football player who was a cornerback in the National Football League (NFL). He played college football for the Michigan State Spartans, earning unanimous All-American honors and winning the Jim Thorpe Award in 2013. Dennard was selected by the Cincinnati Bengals in the first round of the 2014 NFL draft.

== Early life ==
Dennard attended Twiggs County High School in Jeffersonville, Georgia, where he was a letterman in football, basketball, and track. In high school football, he played defensive back and wide receiver. As a senior, he had 40 receptions for 502 yards and 11 touchdowns on offense and 50 tackles and nine interceptions with two touchdowns on defense.

In track & field, Dennard competed as a sprinter. He was the runner-up in the 100-meter dash at the 2010 GHSA 1A State Championships, recording a personal-best time of 10.72 seconds.

Considered a two-star recruit by ESPN.com, Dennard was listed as the #166 wide receiver in the nation in 2010.

== College career ==
Dennard accepted an athletic scholarship to attend Michigan State University, where he played for coach Mark Dantonio's Michigan State Spartans football team from 2010 to 2013.

As a true freshman in 2010, Dennard played in six games with two starts, missing five games due to injury. As a sophomore in 2011, he played in 11 games, missing two due to injury, he finished the season with 42 tackles and three interceptions, two which came against Georgia in the Outback Bowl. As a junior in 2012, he started all 13 games, recording 52 tackles and three interceptions. He was a first-team All-Big Ten Conference selection. As a senior in 2013, he recorded 62 tackles and four interceptions and won the Jim Thorpe Award.

== Professional career ==
=== Pre-draft ===
Coming out of Michigan State, Dennard was a projected consensus first round pick by NFL draft experts and scouts. He received an invitation to the NFL Combine as a top prospect and chose to only run the 40-yard dash, 20-yard dash, 10-yard dash, and perform the bench press. His time in the 40-yard dash (4.51) was the 13th best among all qualifying cornerbacks. NFL draft analyst Mike Mayock stated that Dennard would have to run a 4.45 or lower in the 40 to be considered a top ten overall pick. Dennard said that he was unable to complete all the combine drills due to unforeseen circumstances that limited him. On March 7, 2014, Dennard chose to participate at Michigan State's pro day, along with Max Bullough, Denicos Allen, Bennie Fowler, Dan France, Fou Fonoti, Tyler Hoover, Andrew Maxwell, and nine other teammates. He opted to perform the vertical jump, broad jump, short shuttle, three-cone, and positional drills. He was ranked the top cornerback prospect in the draft by NFLDraftScout.com, CBSSports.com, and Sports Illustrated. He was also ranked the second best cornerback by Mayock.

Pre-draft measurables
Height	Weight	Arm length	Hand span	40-yard dash	10-yard split	20-yard split	20-yard shuttle	Three-cone drill	Vertical jump	Broad jump	Bench press
5 ft 10 7/8 in (1.80 m)	199 lb (90 kg)	30 1/4 in (0.77 m)	9 in (0.23 m)	4.51 s	1.63 s	2.65 s	4.41 s	7.07 s	36 in (0.91 m)	11 ft 2 in (3.40 m)	15 reps
All values from NFL Combine/Michigan State's Pro Day

=== Cincinnati Bengals ===
==== 2014 ====
The Cincinnati Bengals selected Dennard in the first round (24th overall) of the 2014 NFL draft. He was the third cornerback taken, behind Justin Gilbert (8th overall, Cleveland Browns) and Kyle Fuller (14th overall, Chicago Bears). On June 12, 2014, the Bengals signed Dennard to a four-year, $7.97 million contract that includes $6.47 million guaranteed and a signing bonus of $4.12 million.

Dennard joined a deep position group upon his arrival at training camp and competed with Adam Jones, Terence Newman, Leon Hall, and Dre Kirkpatrick for the job as the starting cornerback. Kirkpatrick, Newman, Hall, and Jones were all first round picks in the NFL draft themselves. Head coach Marvin Lewis named Dennard the Bengals' fifth cornerback on their depth chart behind Newman, Hall, Jones, and Kirkpatrick to start the regular season.

On September 14, 2014, Dennard made his professional regular season debut for the Bengals and made one tackle during their 24–10 win over the Atlanta Falcons. The next game, he recorded a season-high three solo tackles and made the first sack of his career on Tennessee Titans quarterback Jake Locker during the Bengals' 33–7 victory. He saw limited playing time behind the host of a talented veterans during his rookie season and finished with only 17 combined tackles (14 solo), one pass deflection, and one sack in 14 games and zero starts. He was limited to only 41 defensive snaps as a rookie in 2014.

The Bengals finished the 2014 season second in the AFC North with a 10–5–1 record. On January 4, 2015, Dennard appeared in his first career playoff game and collected two solo tackles and forced a fumble to set up a touchdown during a 26–10 AFC Wildcard loss to the Indianapolis Colts.

==== 2015 ====
Dennard returned to the Bengals' training camp in 2015 and competed with Leon Hall, Kirkpatrick, Jones, and Josh Shaw for the position as one of the starting cornerbacks. He was named the fourth cornerback on their depth chart to begin the season, behind Jones, Kirkpatrick, and Hall.

In the Bengals' season-opener against the Oakland Raiders, Dennard recorded five solo tackles and defended a pass in a 33–13 victory. During a Week 4 matchup against the Kansas City Chiefs, he earned a season-high six combined tackles and deflected a pass, as the Bengals won their fourth consecutive game 36–21. On October 18, 2015, Dennard made a tackle and his first career interception after picking off a pass attempt by E. J. Manuel during the Bengals' 34–21 victory. On November 22, 2015, he earned the first start of his career and made two solo tackles in a 34–31 loss to the Arizona Cardinals. He started in place of Jones who was unable to play due to a foot injury, but was unable to finish the contest after suffering a shoulder injury. On November 27, 2015, the Bengals officially placed him on injured reserve for the remainder of the season after discovering he had torn ligaments in his right shoulder that would require surgery. Dennard finished the 2015 season with 20 combined tackles (14 solo), three pass deflections, and an interception in ten games and one start.

==== 2016 ====
Dennard recovered from his shoulder surgery in time for Bengals' training camp and competed with Jones, Kirkpatrick, Shaw, and rookie William Jackson III. Lewis named Dennard the third cornerback on the Bengals' depth chart to begin the season.

In Week 4, he made his first start of the season and recorded four tackles during a 22–7 win against the Miami Dolphins. On November 27, 2016, Dennard made a season-high eight combined tackles, as the Bengals 19–14 loss at the Baltimore Ravens. He finished the 2016 season with 47 combined tackles (32 solo) and a pass deflection in 15 games and three starts.

==== 2017 ====
On April 28, 2017, the Bengals picked up the fifth-year option on Dennard's rookie contract that was to pay him a salary of $8.52 million for 2018.

He competed with Jones, Kirkpatrick, Shaw, and Jackson III in training camp for the job as a starting cornerback. Dennard was named the Bengals' third cornerback on their depth chart behind Jones and Kirkpatrick for the second consecutive season.

He started the Bengals' season-opener against the Ravens and collected four combined tackles and deflected a pass during their 20–0 loss. On September 24, 2017, Dennard recorded a career-high ten combined tackles and sacked Aaron Rodgers during a 27–24 loss to the Green Bay Packers. During a Week 4 matchup against the Browns, he recorded four combined tackles and a sack on DeShone Kizer as the Bengals earned a 31–7 victory. On October 29, 2017, Dennard tied his career-high with ten combined tackles and defended a pass during a 24–23 win over the Colts He finished the season playing in all 16 games, starting six, recording a career-high 85 tackles, six passes defensed, and two interceptions.

==== 2019 ====
On March 21, 2019, Dennard re-signed with the Bengals. He was placed on the reserve/physically unable to perform list (PUP) on August 31. Dennard was activated from the PUP list on October 18.

=== Atlanta Falcons ===
Dennard signed with his hometown Atlanta Falcons on August 3, 2020. In Week 3 against the Chicago Bears, Dennard recorded his first interception as a Falcon during the 30–26 loss. He was placed on injured reserve on September 29, with a hamstring injury. He was activated on November 7.

=== Arizona Cardinals ===
On June 3, 2021, Dennard signed a one-year contract with the Arizona Cardinals. He was placed on injured reserve on August 30. Dennard was released on September 9.

=== Indianapolis Colts ===
On October 20, 2021, Dennard was signed to the practice squad of the Indianapolis Colts. He was released by the Colts on December 21.

=== New York Giants ===
On December 22, 2021, Dennard was signed to the New York Giants' practice squad and played a single game for the team before being released on December 28.

=== San Francisco 49ers ===
On January 4, 2022, Dennard was signed to the San Francisco 49ers' practice squad. He played in two regular season games and a playoff game. Dennard's contract expired when the team's season ended on January 30. He re-signed with the team on March 25. Dennard was released by San Francisco on August 15.

== NFL career statistics ==
Legend
**Bold**	Career high

=== Regular season ===
Year	Team	Games		Tackles					Interceptions					Fumbles			
Year	Team	GP	GS	Cmb	Solo	Ast	Sck	TFL	Int	Yds	TD	Lng	PD	FF	FR	Yds	TD
2014	CIN	14	0	17	14	3	1.0	1	0	0	0	0	1	1	0	0	0
2015	CIN	10	1	20	14	6	0.0	0	1	10	0	10	3	0	0	0	0
2016	CIN	15	3	47	32	15	0.0	0	0	0	0	0	1	0	0	0	0
2017	CIN	**16**	6	**85**	**61**	**24**	**2.0**	**2**	**2**	**109**	**1**	**89**	**6**	0	0	0	0
2018	CIN	13	**9**	68	54	14	0.0	1	0	0	0	0	**6**	**2**	**1**	0	0
2019	CIN	9	5	37	25	12	0.0	1	0	0	0	0	5	0	0	0	0
2020	ATL	8	6	36	28	8	0.0	**2**	1	0	0	0	5	0	0	0	0
2021	NYG	1	0	2	1	1	0.0	0	0	0	0	0	0	0	0	0	0
2021	SFO	1	0	1	1	0	0.0	0	0	0	0	0	0	0	0	0	0
		87	30	313	230	83	3.0	7	4	119	1	89	27	3	1	0	0

=== Playoffs ===
Year	Team	Games		Tackles					Interceptions					Fumbles			
Year	Team	GP	GS	Cmb	Solo	Ast	Sck	TFL	Int	Yds	TD	Lng	PD	FF	FR	Yds	TD
2014	CIN	**1**	0	**2**	**2**	0	0.0	0	0	0	0	0	0	**1**	0	0	0
2021	SFO	**1**	0	1	1	0	0.0	0	0	0	0	0	0	0	0	0	0
		2	0	3	3	0	0.0	0	0	0	0	0	0	1	0	0	0

== Personal life ==
Dennard's last name is pronounced as deh-NARD. This pronunciation differs from that of his second cousin, Alfonzo Dennard, due to a family dispute between Darqueze's mother and father. Alfonzo, who is a cornerback in the Arena Football League, pronounces his last name DENN-erd.
