= Myrick's Mill =

Historic mill in Georgia, US

- U.S. National Register of Historic Places
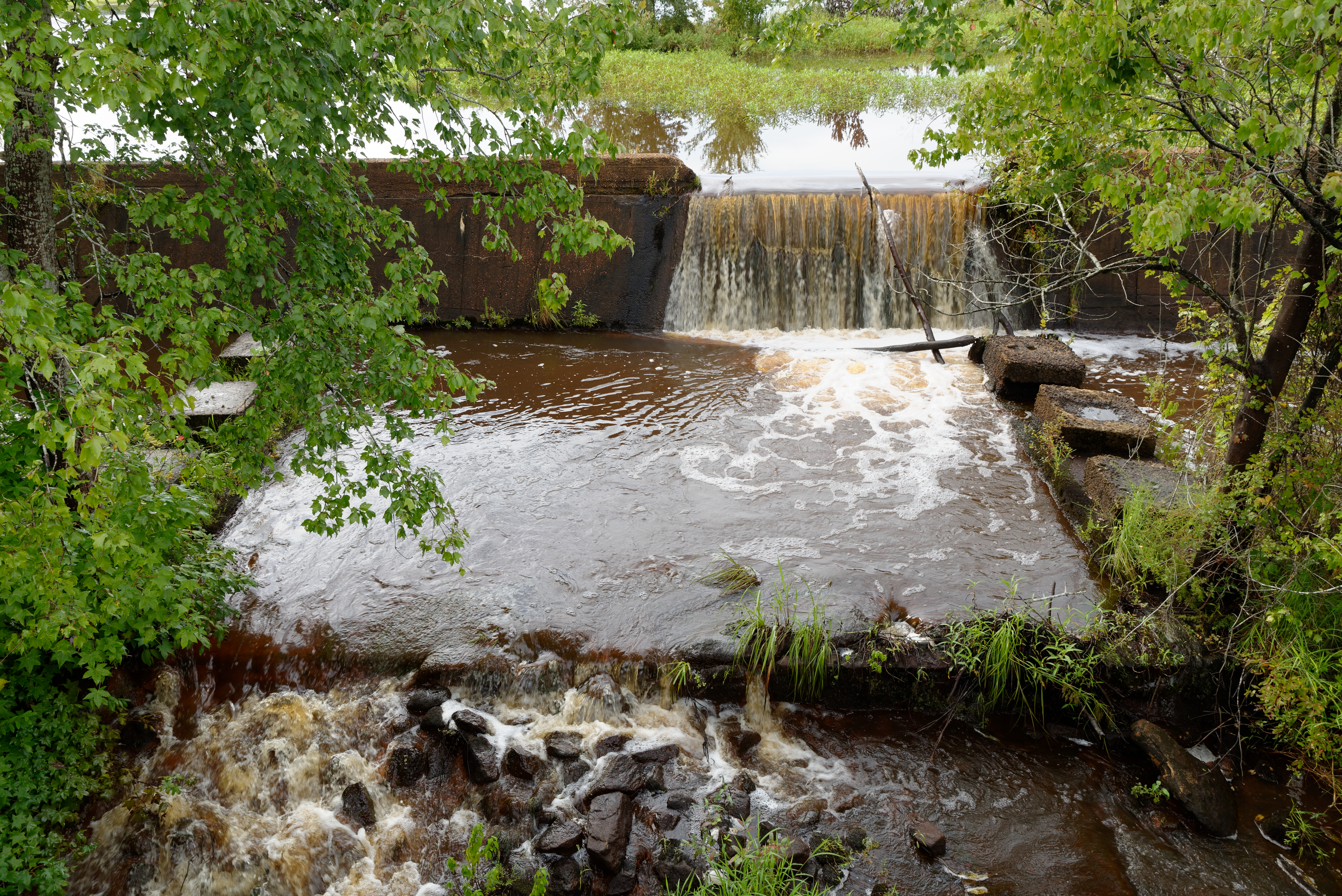
- This is probably the foundation of the mill. The pond and dam are also listed.

- Location within Georgia Location within the United States
- Nearest city: Fitzpatrick, Georgia
- Coordinates: 32°47′2″N 83°22′5″W
- Area: 185 acres (75 ha)
- Built: c.1840
- NRHP reference No.: 75000613
- Added to NRHP: December 6, 1975

Myrick's Mill is a populated place in Twiggs County, Georgia. Originally known as Big Sandy, for a large creek in the area, the settlement included a post office, churches, sawmills, ice house and J.D. Myrick's grist mill (32.78538°N 83.37575°W). Residents produced cotton, fruits and vegetables. The site was added to the National Register of Historic Places on December 6, 1975. The settlement was located northeast of Fitzpatrick, Georgia on county road 378.

The mill, on Big Sandy Creek, was a two-and-a-half-story raised weatherboarded building, about 34 by 60 feet (10 m × 18 m) in plan.

A 185 acres (75 ha) area including the mill and associated dam was listed on the National Register of Historic Places in 1975. It included one contributing building (the mill) and three contributing structures.

In 1975, the mill was reported to be in "a fair, largely unaltered condition" and "one of the few remaining mills in Georgia dating from antebellum times", but the mill has apparently since been demolished.

== See also ==
- National Register of Historic Places listings in Twiggs County, Georgia
