= 2016 United States presidential election in Georgia =

- November 8, 2016
- Turnout: 60.1% ▼1.8 pp

Nominee	Donald Trump	Hillary Clinton
Party	Republican	Democratic
Home state	New York	New York
Running mate	Mike Pence	Tim Kaine
Electoral vote	16	0
Popular vote	2,089,104	1,877,963
Percentage	50.38%	45.29%

Trump
40–50%
50–60%
60–70%
70–80%
80–90%
90–100%
Clinton
40–50%
50–60%
60–70%
70–80%
80–90%
90–100%
Tie/No Data
President before election
Barack Obama
Democratic
Elected President
Donald Trump
Republican

Treemap of the popular vote by county

The 2016 United States presidential election in Georgia was held on Tuesday, November 8, 2016, as part of the 2016 United States presidential election in which all 50 states plus the District of Columbia participated. Georgia voters chose electors to represent them in the Electoral College via a popular vote, pitting the Republican Party's nominee, businessman Donald Trump, and running mate Indiana Governor Mike Pence against the Democratic Party nominee, former Secretary of State Hillary Clinton, and her running mate Virginia Senator Tim Kaine. Georgia has 16 electoral votes in the Electoral College.

Trump won Georgia by 5.13%, a smaller margin than Mitt Romney's 7.82% in 2012 and even John McCain's 5.20% in 2008. Clinton received 45.3% of the vote, making this one of the few states where she outperformed Barack Obama in 2012. Trump's reduced margin of victory made Georgia one of eleven states (plus the District of Columbia) to vote more Democratic in 2016 than in 2012. This trend would continue into 2020, when Trump became the first Republican to lose Georgia since George H. W. Bush in 1992, though he won it back in 2024 by a 2.2% margin.

2016 was the last presidential election in which Georgia voted to the right of any of its neighboring states (Florida, Alabama, Tennessee, North Carolina, and South Carolina), particularly Florida and North Carolina. As of the 2024 presidential race, 2016 is the last time that Burke County voted Democratic, and the last time the Democratic presidential nominee won the nationwide popular vote without winning Georgia.

== Primary elections ==
Georgia held its presidential primaries on March 1, 2016.

=== Democratic primary ===
Results of the Democratic primary by county. Hillary Clinton Bernie Sanders

Four candidates appeared on the ballot:

- Hillary Clinton
- Martin O'Malley (withdrew)
- Bernie Sanders
- Michael Steinberg

2016 Democratic Party's presidential nominating process in Georgia – Summary of results –
Candidate	Popular vote		Estimated delegates		
Candidate	Count	Percentage	Pledged	Unpledged	Total
Hillary Clinton	545,674	71.30%	73	11	84
Bernie Sanders	215,797	28.20%	29	0	29
Martin O'Malley (withdrawn)	2,129	0.28%			
Michael Steinberg	1,766	0.23%			
Uncommitted	—N/a		0	4	4
Total	765,366	100%	102	15	117

=== Republican primary ===
2016 Georgia Republican primary
- March 1, 2016
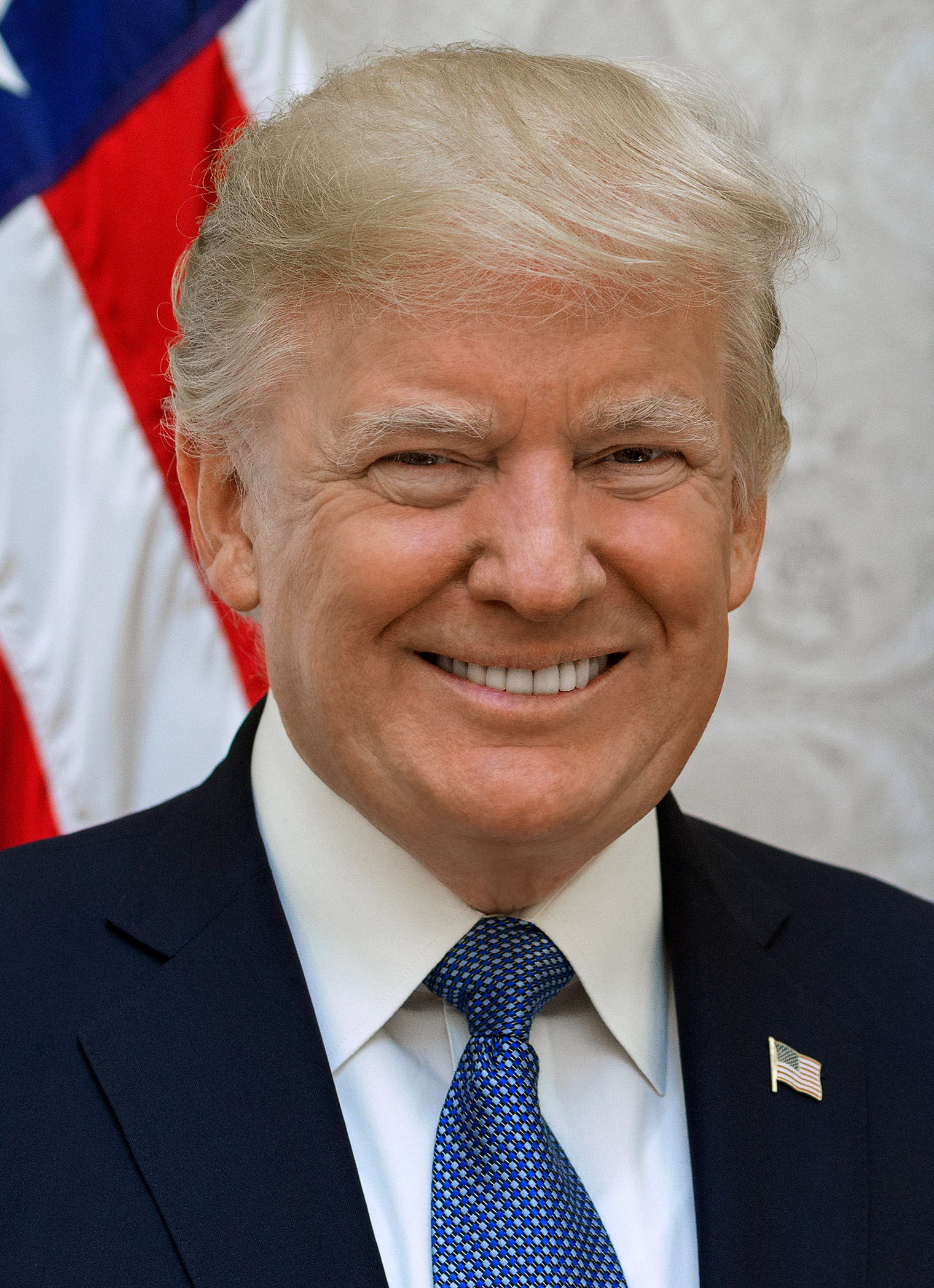

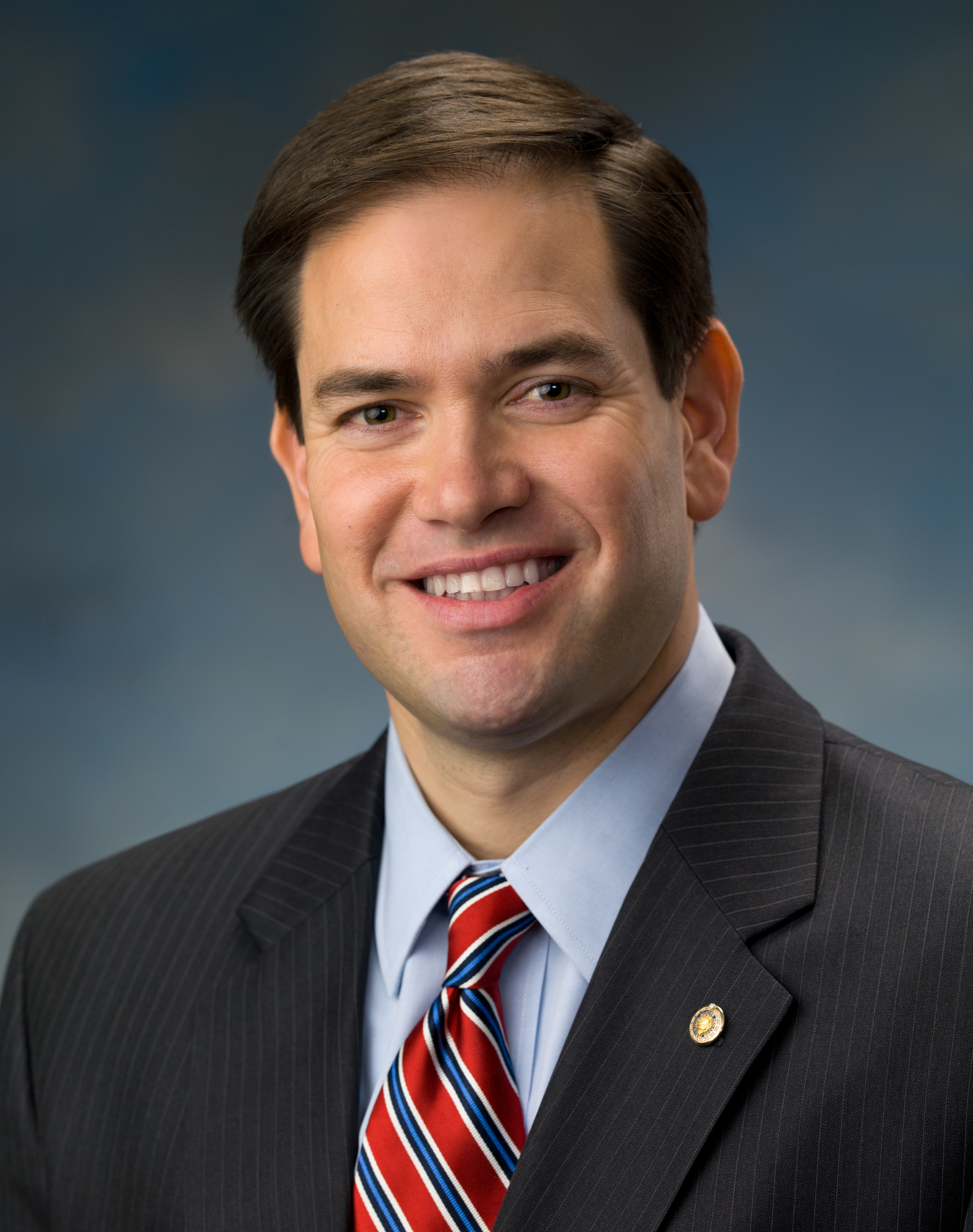

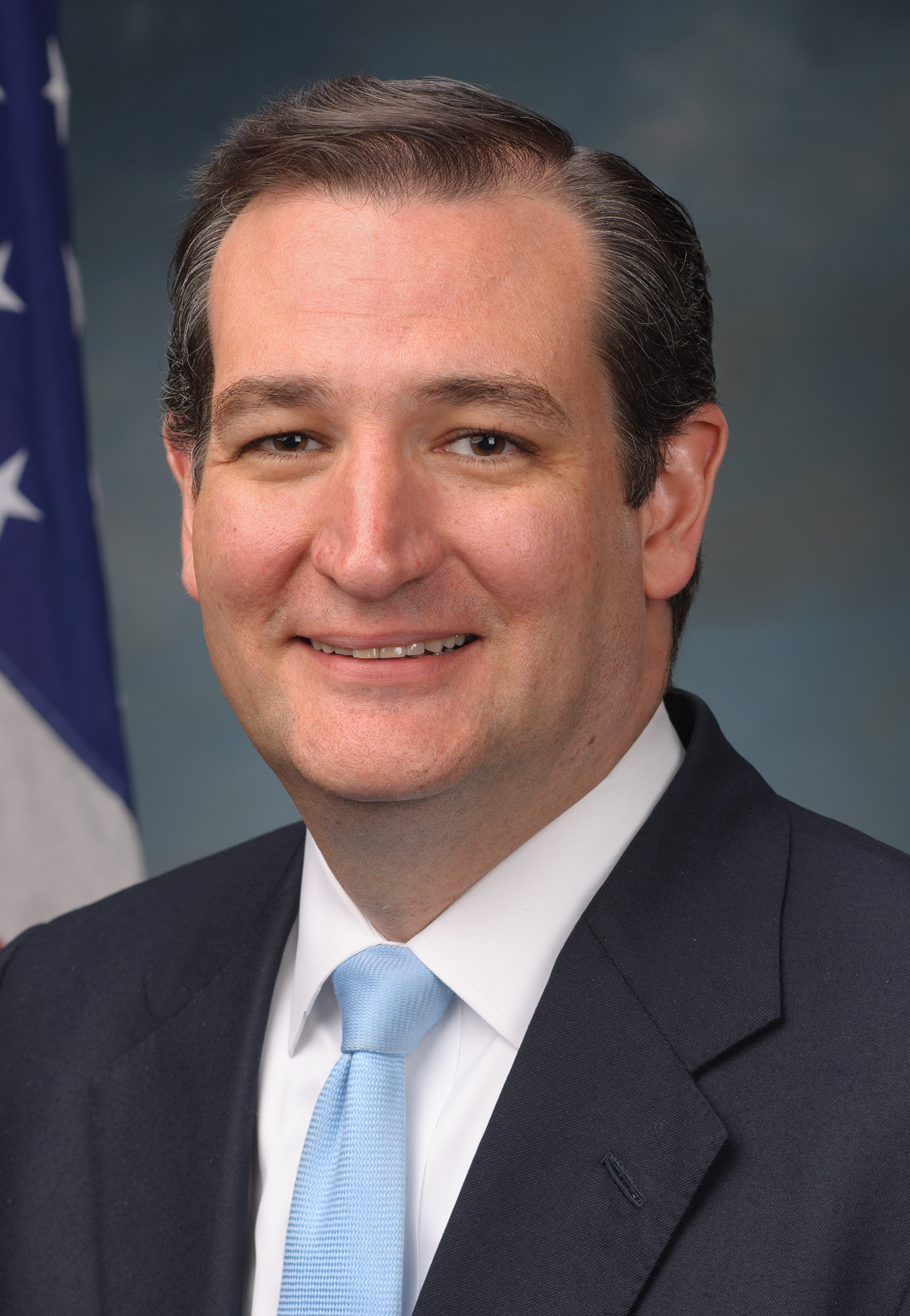

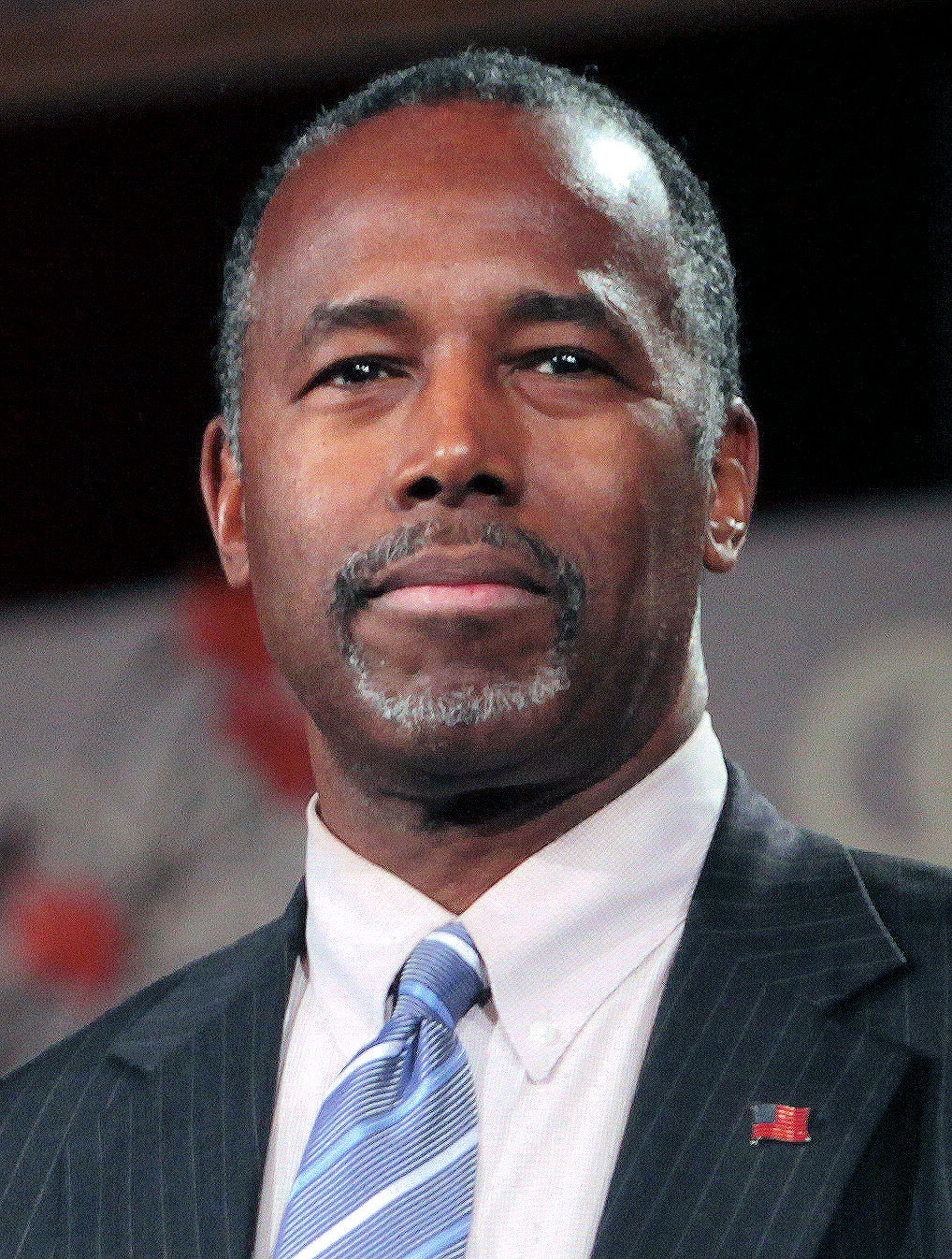

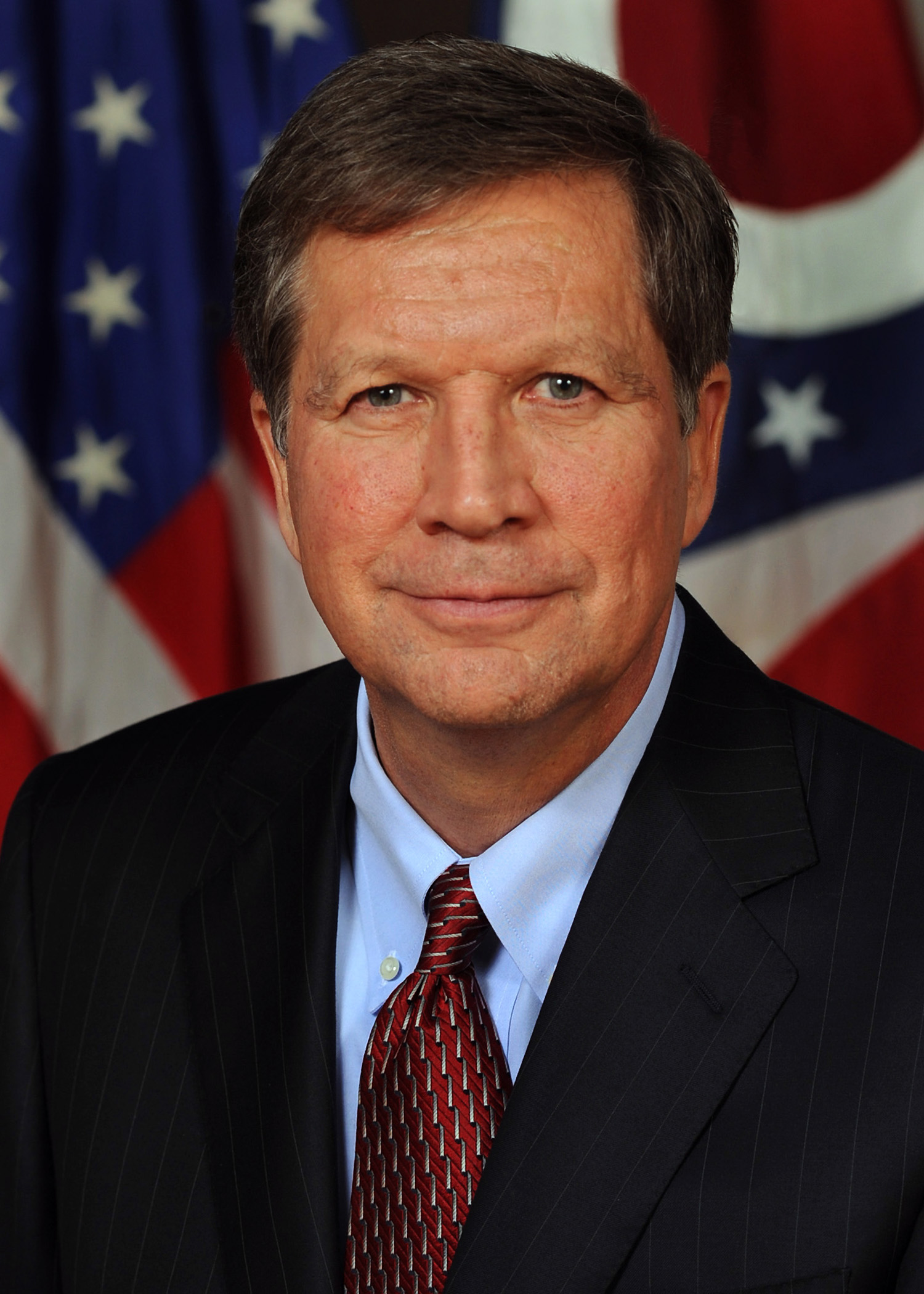
Candidate	Donald Trump	Marco Rubio	Ted Cruz
Home state	New York	Florida	Texas
Delegate count	42	16	18
Candidate	Ben Carson	John Kasich
Home state	Maryland	Ohio
Delegate count	0	0
- Georgia results by county Donald Trump Marco Rubio

The 76 Republican delegates from Georgia were allocated in this way. There were 42 delegates allocated by congressional district; if a candidate received a majority of votes or they were the only candidate to receive at least 20% of the vote in a congressional district, they would receive the district's three delegates. If not, the candidate who won the plurality of the vote in a congressional district would receive two delegates, and the second-place finisher in the district would receive one delegate. There were also 34 at-large delegates; if a candidate got a majority of the vote or they were the only candidate to get the mandatory threshold to receive any delegates (begins at 20%, if no one gets at least 20%, then 15%, if no one gets 15%, then 10%), they would get all of the state's at-large delegates. If not, the delegates would be allocated proportionally among the candidates receiving at least the mandatory threshold.

Georgia Republican primary, March 1, 2016
Candidate	Votes	Percentage	Actual delegate count		
Candidate	Votes	Percentage	Bound	Unbound	Total
Donald Trump	502,994	38.81%	42	0	42
Marco Rubio	316,836	24.45%	16	0	16
Ted Cruz	305,847	23.60%	18	0	18
Ben Carson	80,723	6.23%	0	0	0
John Kasich	72,508	5.59%	0	0	0
Jeb Bush (withdrawn)	7,686	0.59%	0	0	0
Rand Paul (withdrawn)	2,910	0.22%	0	0	0
Mike Huckabee (withdrawn)	2,625	0.20%	0	0	0
Chris Christie (withdrawn)	1,486	0.11%	0	0	0
Carly Fiorina (withdrawn)	1,146	0.09%	0	0	0
Rick Santorum (withdrawn)	539	0.04%	0	0	0
Lindsey Graham (withdrawn)	428	0.03%	0	0	0
George Pataki (withdrawn)	236	0.02%	0	0	0
Unprojected delegates:			0	0	0
Total:	1,295,964	100.00%	76	0	76
Source: The Green Papers

=== Green convention ===
On June 4, the Georgia Green Party held its state convention and presidential preference vote.

Georgia Green Party Convention, June 4, 2016
Candidate	Votes	Percentage	National delegates
Jill Stein	-	-	3
William Kreml	-	-	1
Sedinam Kinamo Christin Moyowasifza Curry	-	-	-
Kent Mesplay	-	-	-
Darryl Cherney	-	-	-
Total	-	-	4

== General election ==
=== Predictions ===
Source	Ranking	As of
ABC News	Tossup	November 7, 2016
CNN	Lean R	November 4, 2016
Cook Political Report	Lean R	November 7, 2016
Electoral-vote.com	Lean R	November 7, 2016
Los Angeles Times	Lean R	November 6, 2016
NBC	Tossup	November 7, 2016
RealClearPolitics	Tossup	November 7, 2016
Rothenberg Political Report	Lean R	November 7, 2016
Sabato's Crystal Ball	Likely R	November 7, 2016

=== Polling ===
Throughout the campaign, Republican Donald Trump won the vast majority of pre-election polls. The average of the last three polls showed Trump leading Hillary Clinton 50% to 46%, which was accurate compared to the results.

=== Results ===
The voting age population was 7,168,068, of which 5,443,046, were registered to vote. Turnout for the presidential election was 4,146,825, which is 57.85% of the voting age population and 76.19% of registered voters.

Seventeen candidates received write-in votes, of which the large plurality (13,017) went to Evan McMullin.

2016 United States presidential election in Georgia
Party	Candidate	Running mate	Votes	Percentage	Electoral votes
Republican	Donald Trump	Mike Pence	2,089,104	50.77%	16
Democratic	Hillary Clinton	Tim Kaine	1,877,963	45.64%	0
Libertarian	Gary Johnson	William Weld	125,306	3.05%	0
Independent	Evan McMullin (write-in)	Nathan Johnson	13,017	0.32%	0
Green	Jill Stein (write-in)	Ajamu Baraka	7,674	0.19%	0
Constitution	Darrell Castle (write-in)	Scott Bradley	1,110	0.03%	0
Others / Write-In Votes	-	-	558	0%	0
Totals			4,114,732	100.00%	16
Source: Federal Elections Commission

==== By county ====
County	Donald Trump Republican		Hillary Clinton Democratic		Various candidates Other parties		Margin		Total
County	#	%	#	%	#	%	#	%	Total
Appling	5,494	78.35%	1,434	20.45%	84	1.20%	4,060	57.90%	7,012
Atkinson	1,878	71.95%	697	26.70%	35	1.35%	1,181	45.25%	2,610
Bacon	3,364	83.49%	608	15.09%	57	1.42%	2,756	68.40%	4,029
Baker	775	53.82%	650	45.14%	15	1.04%	125	8.68%	1,440
Baldwin	7,697	47.76%	7,970	49.45%	449	2.79%	-273	-1.69%	16,116
Banks	6,134	87.94%	684	9.81%	157	2.25%	5,450	78.13%	6,975
Barrow	21,108	72.35%	6,580	22.55%	1,486	5.10%	14,528	49.80%	29,174
Bartow	29,911	75.28%	8,212	20.67%	1,610	4.05%	21,699	54.61%	39,733
Ben Hill	3,739	62.99%	2,101	35.39%	96	1.62%	1,638	27.60%	5,936
Berrien	5,422	81.99%	1,047	15.83%	144	2.18%	4,375	66.16%	6,613
Bibb	24,043	38.24%	36,787	58.50%	2,050	3.26%	-12,744	-20.26%	62,880
Bleckley	3,719	74.77%	1,101	22.14%	154	3.09%	2,618	52.63%	4,974
Brantley	5,567	88.35%	619	9.82%	115	1.83%	4,948	78.53%	6,301
Brooks	3,701	58.41%	2,528	39.90%	107	1.69%	1,173	18.51%	6,336
Bryan	10,529	68.95%	4,014	26.29%	728	4.76%	6,515	42.66%	15,271
Bulloch	15,097	59.01%	9,261	36.20%	1,227	4.79%	5,836	22.81%	25,585
Burke	4,491	47.73%	4,731	50.28%	188	1.99%	-240	-2.55%	9,410
Butts	6,717	70.60%	2,566	26.97%	231	2.43%	4,151	43.63%	9,514
Calhoun	830	40.99%	1,179	58.22%	16	0.79%	-349	-17.23%	2,025
Camden	12,310	64.56%	5,930	31.10%	829	4.34%	6,380	33.46%	19,069
Candler	2,664	70.79%	1,026	27.27%	73	1.94%	1,638	43.52%	3,763
Carroll	30,029	67.54%	12,464	28.03%	1,966	4.43%	17,565	39.51%	44,459
Catoosa	20,876	77.49%	4,771	17.71%	1,293	4.80%	16,105	59.78%	26,940
Charlton	2,951	73.21%	1,004	24.91%	76	1.88%	1,947	48.30%	4,031
Chatham	45,688	40.41%	62,290	55.10%	5,073	4.49%	-16,602	-14.69%	113,051
Chattahoochee	751	54.03%	594	42.73%	45	3.24%	157	11.30%	1,390
Chattooga	6,462	78.31%	1,613	19.55%	177	2.14%	4,849	58.76%	8,252
Cherokee	80,649	71.51%	25,231	22.37%	6,904	6.12%	55,418	49.14%	112,784
Clarke	12,717	27.96%	29,603	65.10%	3,156	6.94%	-16,886	-37.14%	45,476
Clay	566	44.46%	697	54.75%	10	0.79%	-131	-10.29%	1,273
Clayton	12,645	13.51%	78,220	83.59%	2,715	2.90%	-65,575	-70.08%	93,580
Clinch	1,727	70.09%	686	27.84%	51	2.07%	1,041	42.25%	2,464
Cobb	152,912	45.77%	160,121	47.93%	21,025	6.30%	-7,209	-2.16%	334,058
Coffee	9,588	68.50%	4,094	29.25%	316	2.25%	5,494	39.25%	13,998
Colquitt	9,898	72.65%	3,463	25.42%	263	1.93%	6,435	47.23%	13,624
Columbia	43,085	66.07%	18,887	28.96%	3,235	4.97%	24,198	37.11%	65,207
Cook	4,176	68.68%	1,753	28.83%	151	2.49%	2,423	39.85%	6,080
Coweta	42,533	68.37%	16,583	26.66%	3,094	4.97%	25,950	41.71%	62,210
Crawford	3,635	70.23%	1,421	27.45%	120	2.32%	2,214	42.78%	5,176
Crisp	4,549	60.26%	2,837	37.58%	163	2.16%	1,712	22.68%	7,549
Dade	5,051	79.41%	965	15.17%	345	5.42%	4,086	64.24%	6,361
Dawson	9,900	83.76%	1,448	12.25%	472	3.99%	8,452	71.51%	11,820
Decatur	6,020	58.35%	4,124	39.97%	173	1.68%	1,896	18.38%	10,317
DeKalb	51,468	16.19%	251,370	79.08%	15,011	4.73%	-199,902	-62.89%	317,849
Dodge	5,021	71.64%	1,839	26.24%	149	2.12%	3,182	45.40%	7,009
Dooly	1,951	50.56%	1,872	48.51%	36	0.93%	79	2.05%	3,859
Dougherty	10,232	29.83%	23,311	67.96%	760	2.21%	-13,079	-38.13%	34,303
Douglas	24,817	42.70%	31,005	53.34%	2,301	3.96%	-6,188	-10.64%	58,123
Early	2,552	53.13%	2,168	45.14%	83	1.73%	384	7.99%	4,803
Echols	1,007	85.19%	156	13.20%	19	1.61%	851	71.99%	1,182
Effingham	17,874	75.73%	4,853	20.56%	876	3.71%	13,021	55.17%	23,603
Elbert	5,292	65.93%	2,539	31.63%	196	2.44%	2,753	34.30%	8,027
Emanuel	5,335	67.57%	2,435	30.84%	126	1.59%	2,900	36.73%	7,896
Evans	2,404	66.26%	1,130	31.15%	94	2.59%	1,274	35.11%	3,628
Fannin	9,632	81.10%	1,923	16.19%	321	2.71%	7,709	64.91%	11,876
Fayette	35,048	56.98%	23,284	37.85%	3,179	5.17%	11,764	19.13%	61,511
Floyd	24,114	69.17%	9,159	26.27%	1,587	4.56%	14,955	42.90%	34,860
Forsyth	69,851	70.58%	23,462	23.71%	5,651	5.71%	46,389	46.87%	98,964
Franklin	7,054	82.50%	1,243	14.54%	253	2.96%	5,811	67.96%	8,550
Fulton	117,783	26.85%	297,051	67.70%	23,917	5.45%	-179,268	-40.85%	438,751
Gilmer	10,477	81.55%	1,965	15.29%	406	3.16%	8,512	66.26%	12,848
Glascock	1,235	88.85%	138	9.93%	17	1.22%	1,097	78.92%	1,390
Glynn	21,512	62.47%	11,775	34.19%	1,150	3.34%	9,737	28.28%	34,437
Gordon	15,191	79.69%	3,181	16.69%	690	3.62%	12,010	63.00%	19,062
Grady	6,053	65.33%	3,013	32.52%	199	2.15%	3,040	32.81%	9,265
Greene	5,490	61.55%	3,199	35.87%	230	2.58%	2,291	25.68%	8,919
Gwinnett	146,989	44.41%	166,153	50.20%	17,808	5.39%	-19,164	-5.79%	330,950
Habersham	13,190	80.76%	2,483	15.20%	660	4.04%	10,707	65.56%	16,333
Hall	51,733	72.72%	16,180	22.74%	3,229	4.54%	35,553	49.98%	71,142
Hancock	843	23.49%	2,701	75.28%	44	1.23%	-1,858	-51.79%	3,588
Haralson	9,585	83.79%	1,475	12.89%	379	3.32%	8,110	70.90%	11,439
Harris	11,936	72.33%	4,086	24.76%	480	2.91%	7,850	47.57%	16,502
Hart	7,286	71.71%	2,585	25.44%	290	2.85%	4,701	46.27%	10,161
Heard	3,370	79.41%	743	17.51%	131	3.08%	2,627	61.90%	4,244
Henry	45,724	46.02%	50,057	50.38%	3,586	3.60%	-4,333	-4.36%	99,367
Houston	35,430	58.65%	22,553	37.34%	2,423	4.01%	12,877	21.31%	60,406
Irwin	2,716	74.01%	891	24.28%	63	1.71%	1,825	49.73%	3,670
Jackson	21,784	79.44%	4,491	16.38%	1,148	4.18%	17,293	63.06%	27,423
Jasper	4,360	71.86%	1,544	25.45%	163	2.69%	2,816	46.41%	6,067
Jeff Davis	4,104	80.17%	901	17.60%	114	2.23%	3,203	62.57%	5,119
Jefferson	3,063	43.91%	3,821	54.77%	92	1.32%	-758	-10.86%	6,976
Jenkins	1,895	62.01%	1,123	36.75%	38	1.24%	772	25.26%	3,056
Johnson	2,519	68.34%	1,136	30.82%	31	0.84%	1,383	37.52%	3,686
Jones	8,305	65.98%	3,961	31.47%	321	2.55%	4,344	34.51%	12,587
Lamar	5,190	67.87%	2,270	29.68%	187	2.45%	2,920	38.19%	7,647
Lanier	1,984	69.10%	806	28.07%	81	2.83%	1,178	41.03%	2,871
Laurens	12,411	63.33%	6,752	34.46%	433	2.21%	5,659	28.87%	19,596
Lee	10,646	74.73%	3,170	22.25%	430	3.02%	7,476	52.48%	14,246
Liberty	6,134	37.68%	9,556	58.70%	589	3.62%	-3,422	-21.02%	16,279
Lincoln	2,759	67.26%	1,273	31.03%	70	1.71%	1,486	36.23%	4,102
Long	2,626	63.78%	1,360	33.03%	131	3.19%	1,266	30.75%	4,117
Lowndes	21,635	56.84%	15,064	39.58%	1,364	3.58%	6,571	17.26%	38,063
Lumpkin	9,619	76.85%	2,220	17.74%	678	5.41%	7,399	59.11%	12,517
Macon	1,540	35.92%	2,705	63.10%	42	0.98%	-1,165	-27.18%	4,287
Madison	9,201	76.16%	2,425	20.07%	455	3.77%	6,776	56.09%	12,081
Marion	1,921	60.22%	1,213	38.03%	56	1.75%	708	22.19%	3,190
McDuffie	5,432	58.27%	3,699	39.68%	191	2.05%	1,733	18.59%	9,322
McIntosh	3,487	58.73%	2,303	38.79%	147	1.48%	1,184	19.94%	5,937
Meriwether	5,222	56.47%	3,804	41.13%	222	2.40%	1,418	15.34%	9,248
Miller	1,891	74.33%	623	24.49%	30	1.18%	1,268	49.84%	2,544
Mitchell	4,279	54.30%	3,493	44.33%	108	1.37%	786	9.97%	7,880
Monroe	8,832	69.61%	3,571	28.15%	284	2.24%	5,261	41.46%	12,687
Montgomery	2,670	74.66%	847	23.69%	59	1.65%	1,823	50.97%	3,576
Morgan	6,559	68.78%	2,663	27.93%	314	3.29%	3,896	40.85%	9,536
Murray	10,341	82.67%	1,800	14.39%	368	2.94%	8,541	68.28%	12,509
Muscogee	26,976	38.80%	39,851	57.32%	2,698	3.88%	-12,875	-18.52%	69,525
Newton	20,913	47.27%	21,943	49.60%	1,382	3.13%	-1,030	-2.33%	44,238
Oconee	13,425	65.96%	5,581	27.42%	1,347	6.62%	7,844	38.54%	20,353
Oglethorpe	4,625	69.30%	1,831	27.43%	218	3.27%	2,794	41.87%	6,674
Paulding	44,662	68.21%	18,025	27.53%	2,793	4.26%	26,637	40.68%	65,480
Peach	5,413	50.08%	5,100	47.18%	296	2.74%	313	2.90%	10,809
Pickens	11,651	82.51%	1,979	14.02%	490	3.47%	9,672	68.49%	14,120
Pierce	6,302	86.20%	903	12.35%	106	1.45%	5,399	73.85%	7,311
Pike	7,278	83.03%	1,240	14.15%	248	2.82%	6,038	68.88%	8,766
Polk	11,014	77.16%	2,867	20.08%	394	2.76%	8,147	57.08%	14,275
Pulaski	2,437	67.60%	1,104	30.62%	64	1.78%	1,333	36.98%	3,605
Putnam	6,544	68.68%	2,758	28.95%	226	2.37%	3,786	39.73%	9,528
Quitman	575	55.08%	461	44.16%	8	0.76%	114	10.92%	1,044
Rabun	6,287	78.12%	1,444	17.94%	317	3.94%	4,843	60.18%	8,048
Randolph	1,271	43.84%	1,598	55.12%	30	1.04%	-327	-11.28%	2,899
Richmond	24,461	32.17%	48,814	64.21%	2,750	3.62%	-24,353	-32.04%	76,025
Rockdale	13,478	35.39%	23,255	61.06%	1,354	3.55%	-9,777	-25.67%	38,087
Schley	1,472	76.55%	401	20.85%	50	2.60%	1,071	55.70%	1,923
Screven	3,305	57.83%	2,300	40.24%	110	1.93%	1,005	17.59%	5,715
Seminole	2,345	65.36%	1,189	33.14%	54	1.50%	1,156	32.22%	3,588
Spalding	15,646	60.58%	9,357	36.23%	823	3.19%	6,289	24.35%	25,826
Stephens	7,686	78.31%	1,837	18.72%	292	2.97%	5,849	59.59%	9,815
Stewart	805	39.12%	1,222	59.38%	31	1.50%	-417	-20.26%	2,058
Sumter	5,276	47.76%	5,520	49.97%	251	2.27%	-244	-2.21%	11,047
Talbot	1,196	36.68%	2,002	61.39%	63	1.93%	-806	-24.71%	3,261
Taliaferro	349	38.91%	545	60.76%	3	0.33%	-196	-21.85%	897
Tattnall	5,096	73.54%	1,681	24.26%	153	2.20%	3,415	49.28%	6,930
Taylor	2,064	60.56%	1,296	38.03%	48	1.41%	768	22.53%	3,408
Telfair	2,450	64.54%	1,313	34.59%	33	0.87%	1,137	29.95%	3,796
Terrell	1,874	44.58%	2,267	53.92%	63	1.50%	-393	-9.34%	4,204
Thomas	11,228	59.45%	7,142	37.82%	515	2.73%	4,086	21.63%	18,885
Tift	9,584	67.13%	4,347	30.45%	345	2.42%	5,237	36.68%	14,276
Toombs	6,615	72.39%	2,338	25.59%	185	2.02%	4,277	46.80%	9,138
Towns	5,383	79.16%	1,210	17.79%	207	3.05%	4,173	61.37%	6,800
Treutlen	1,809	66.93%	862	31.89%	32	1.18%	947	35.04%	2,703
Troup	15,750	60.32%	9,713	37.20%	648	2.48%	6,037	23.12%	26,111
Turner	2,095	61.53%	1,246	36.59%	64	1.88%	849	24.94%	3,405
Twiggs	2,035	50.14%	1,971	48.56%	53	1.30%	64	1.58%	4,059
Union	9,852	81.67%	1,963	16.27%	248	2.06%	7,889	65.40%	12,063
Upson	7,292	66.69%	3,475	31.78%	167	1.53%	3,817	34.91%	10,934
Walker	18,950	77.73%	4,215	17.29%	1,214	4.98%	14,735	60.44%	24,379
Walton	31,125	76.18%	8,292	20.29%	1,441	3.53%	22,833	55.89%	40,858
Ware	8,513	69.87%	3,440	28.23%	231	1.90%	5,073	41.64%	12,184
Warren	991	42.46%	1,314	56.30%	29	1.24%	-323	-13.84%	2,334
Washington	4,149	48.90%	4,200	49.50%	136	1.60%	-51	-0.60%	8,485
Wayne	8,153	78.09%	2,041	19.55%	246	2.36%	6,112	58.54%	10,440
Webster	630	56.45%	473	42.38%	13	1.17%	157	14.07%	1,116
Wheeler	1,421	67.60%	646	30.73%	35	1.67%	775	36.87%	2,102
White	9,761	81.94%	1,674	14.05%	477	4.01%	8,087	67.89%	11,912
Whitfield	21,537	69.98%	7,937	25.79%	1,302	4.23%	13,600	44.19%	30,776
Wilcox	2,096	70.43%	852	28.63%	28	0.94%	1,244	41.80%	2,976
Wilkes	2,572	57.33%	1,848	41.19%	66	1.48%	724	16.14%	4,486
Wilkinson	2,333	54.29%	1,894	44.08%	70	1.63%	439	10.21%	4,297
Worth	6,152	73.95%	2,020	24.28%	147	1.77%	4,132	49.67%	8,319
Totals	2,089,104	50.77%	1,877,963	45.64%	179,758	4.33%	211,141	5.13%	4,146,825

Counties that flipped from Democratic to Republican

- Baker (largest city: Newton)
- Dooly (largest city: Vienna)
- Early (largest city: Blakely)
- Peach (largest city: Fort Valley)
- Quitman (largest city: Georgetown)
- Twiggs (largest city: Jeffersonville)

Counties that flipped from Republican to Democratic

- Cobb (largest city: Marietta)
- Gwinnett (largest city: Peachtree Corners)
- Henry (largest city: Stockbridge)

==== By congressional district ====
Trump won ten of 14 congressional districts.

District	Trump	Clinton	Representative
1st	56%	41%	Buddy Carter
2nd	43%	55%	Sanford Bishop
3rd	64%	33%	Lynn Westmoreland
3rd	64%	33%	Drew Ferguson
4th	22%	75%	Hank Johnson
5th	12%	85%	John Lewis
6th	48%	47%	Tom Price
7th	51%	45%	Rob Woodall
8th	63%	34%	Austin Scott
9th	78%	19%	Doug Collins
10th	61%	36%	Jody Hice
11th	60%	35%	Barry Loudermilk
12th	57%	41%	Rick W. Allen
13th	27%	71%	David Scott
14th	75%	22%	Tom Graves

== Analysis ==
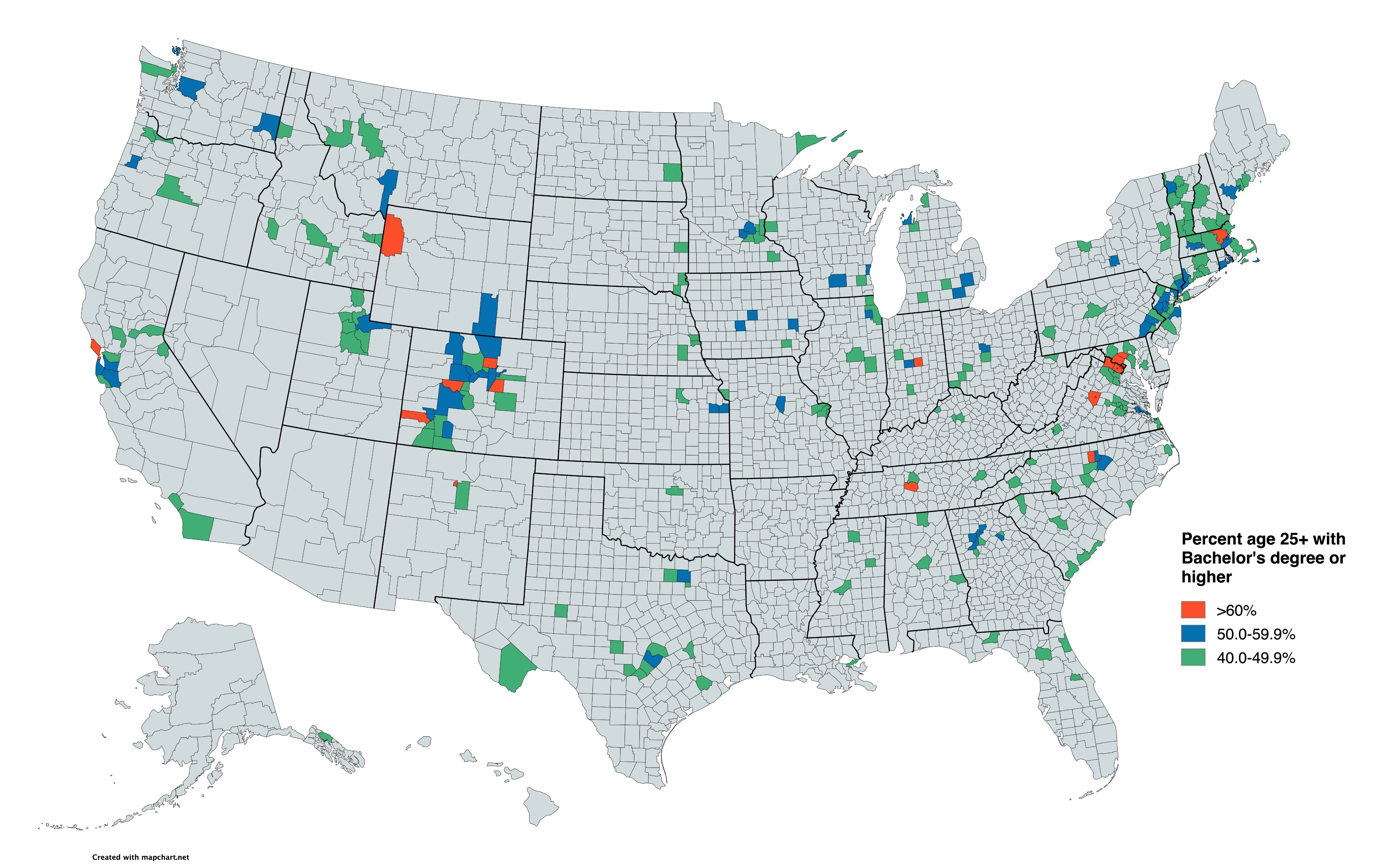
A map of the most college-educated counties in the United States

The fast-growing and increasingly diverse Atlanta metropolitan area in particular shifted strongly towards the Democratic Party, with Clinton becoming the first Democrat to win Henry County since Georgia native Jimmy Carter in 1980, and Cobb and Gwinnett counties since 1976 (when Carter won every county in the state).

The leftward shift in urban Georgia between 2012 and 2016 foreshadowed Georgia's transition from a Republican stronghold into a competitive (albeit slightly red-leaning) swing state. In contrast to white working class voters shifting rightward in much of the country, in Georgia white college-educated voters in the Metro Atlanta shifted leftward (see the map).

Trump thus became the first Republican to win the White House without carrying Cobb County since Dwight D. Eisenhower in 1956, as well as the first to do so without carrying Douglas, Gwinnett or Rockdale counties since Richard Nixon in 1968, and the first to do so without carrying Henry, Newton, Baldwin, or Sumter counties (the latter two being in the Black Belt) since Ronald Reagan in 1980.

As of 2024, this is the most recent presidential election in which Georgia was not seriously contested, as well as the last in which the Democratic candidate won Burke County, a Black Belt county and Augusta suburb that was formerly predominantly-Black but has seen a decline in said demographic.

Georgia weighed in for this election as 7.23% more Republican than the national average, despite the fact that it had voted to the right of the nation by at least 10 points from 1996 to 2012.

== See also ==
- 2016 Democratic Party presidential debates and forums
- 2016 Democratic Party presidential primaries
- 2016 Republican Party presidential debates and forums
- 2016 Republican Party presidential primaries
