= Twiggs County Courthouse =

Historic courthouse in the U.S.

- U.S. National Register of Historic Places
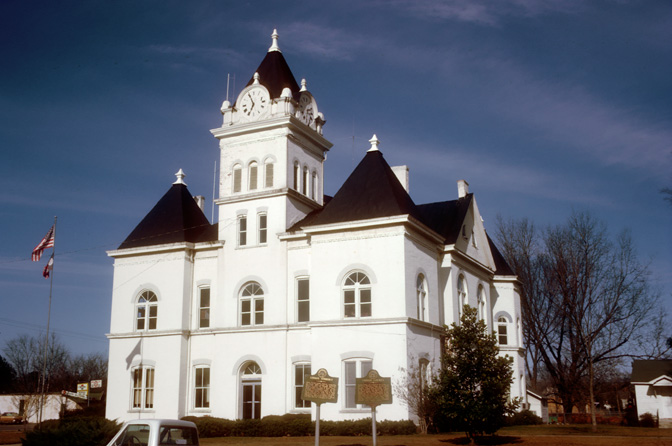
- Twiggs County Courthouse in a 1975 photograph by Calvin Beale

- Location within Georgia Location within the United States
- Interactive map showing the location of Twiggs County Courthouse
- Location: Courthouse Sq., Jeffersonville, Georgia
- Coordinates: 32°41′15″N 83°20′45″W
- Area: 2 acres (0.81 ha)
- Built: 1902
- Built by: Wagner, Fred
- Architect: Golucke, J.W.,& Co.
- Architectural style: Romanesque
- MPS: Georgia County Courthouses TR
- NRHP reference No.: 80001248
- Added to NRHP: September 18, 1980

Twiggs County Courthouse is a historic county courthouse in Jeffersonville, Georgia, county seat of Twiggs County, Georgia. The Romanesque Revival architecture building was designed by J.W. Golucke and built from 1902 to 1904. The previous courthouse had burned down in 1901. It was added to the National Register of Historic Places in 1980. It is located in Courthouse Square. The square includes a Confederate soldier memorial.

== Photos ==
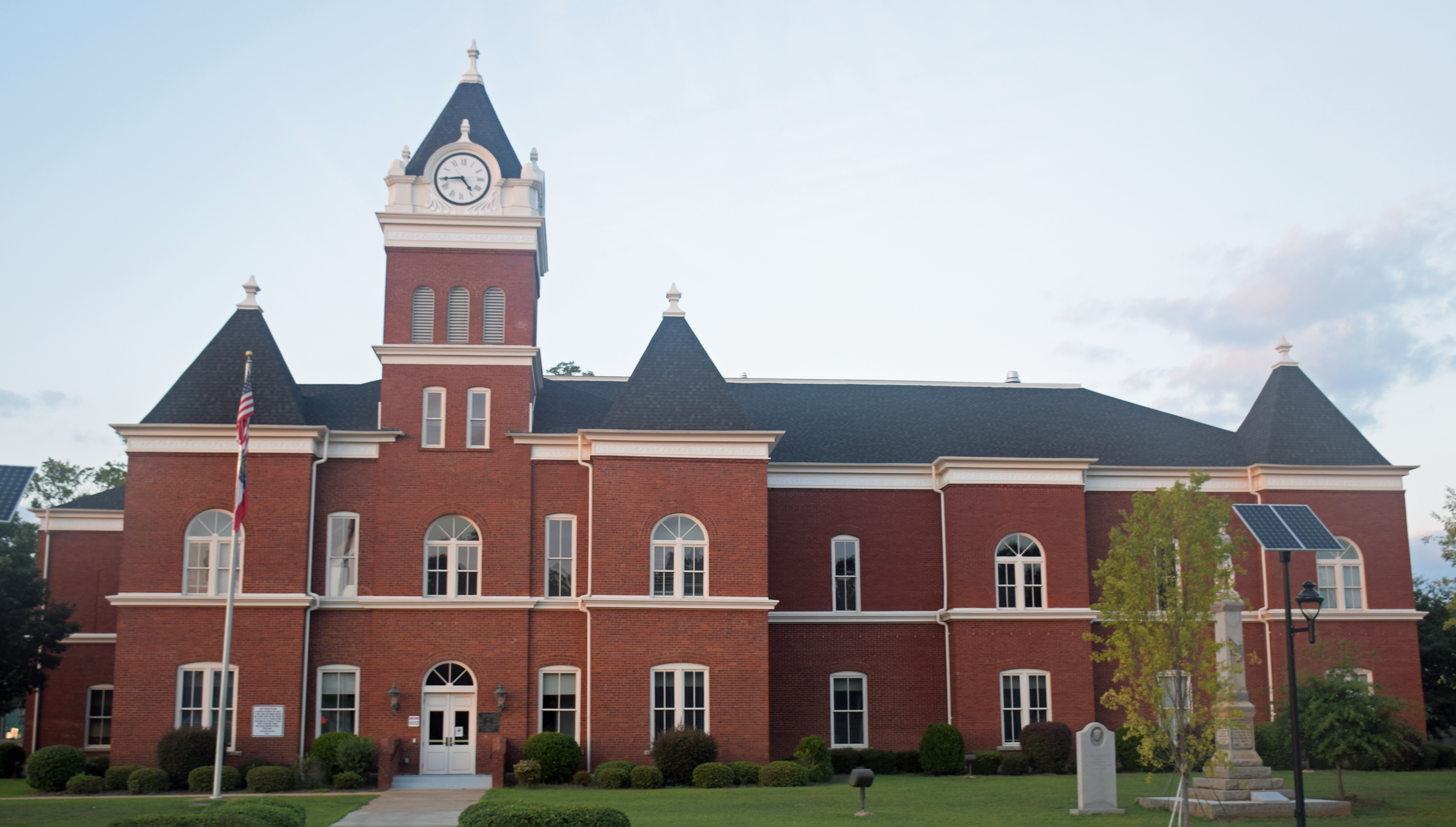
Courthouse in 2015; original part is on the left

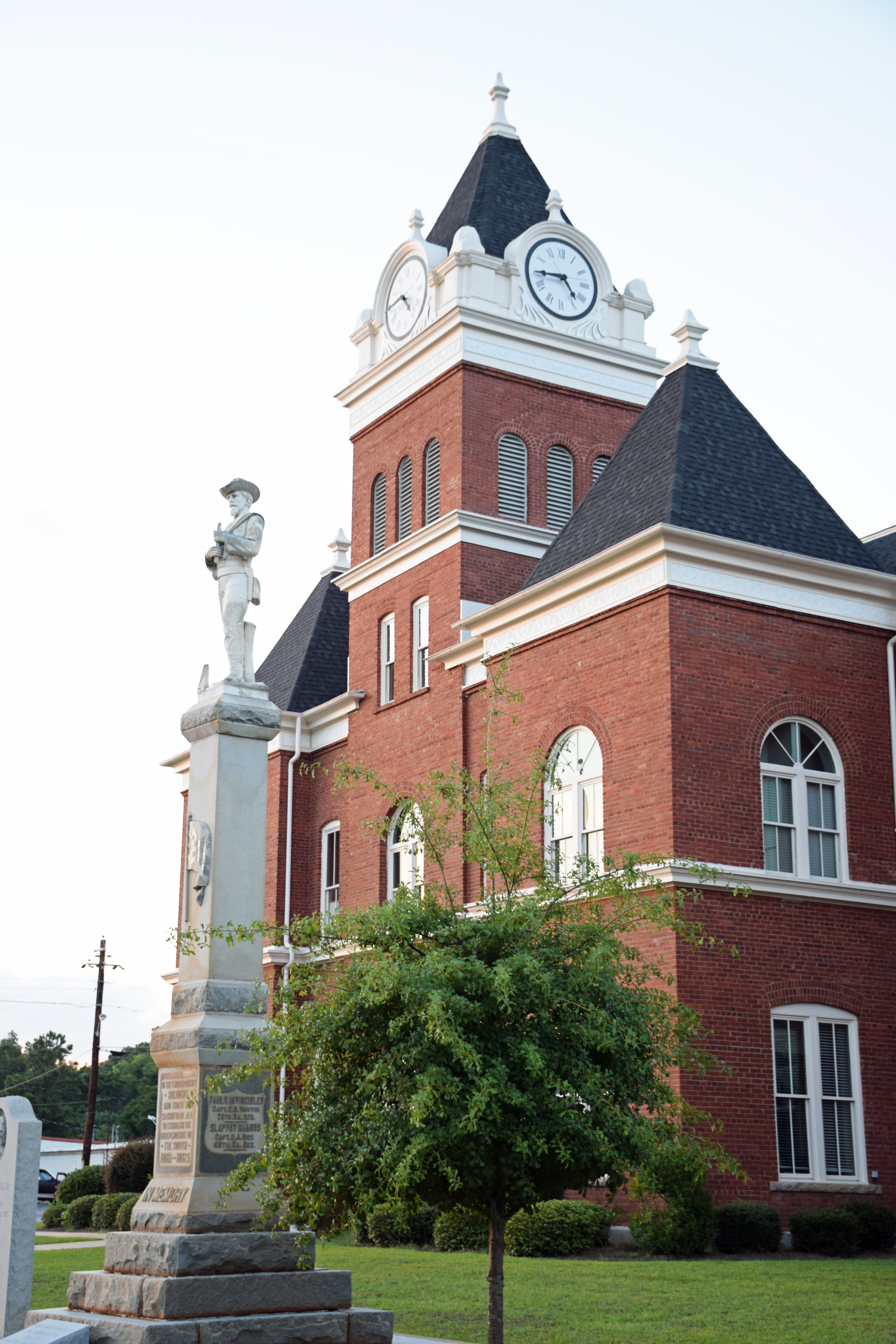
Confederate soldier monument

== See also ==
- National Register of Historic Places listings in Twiggs County, Georgia
