= 2016 Georgia Republican presidential primary =

- March 1, 2016

76 pledged delegates to the Republican National Convention
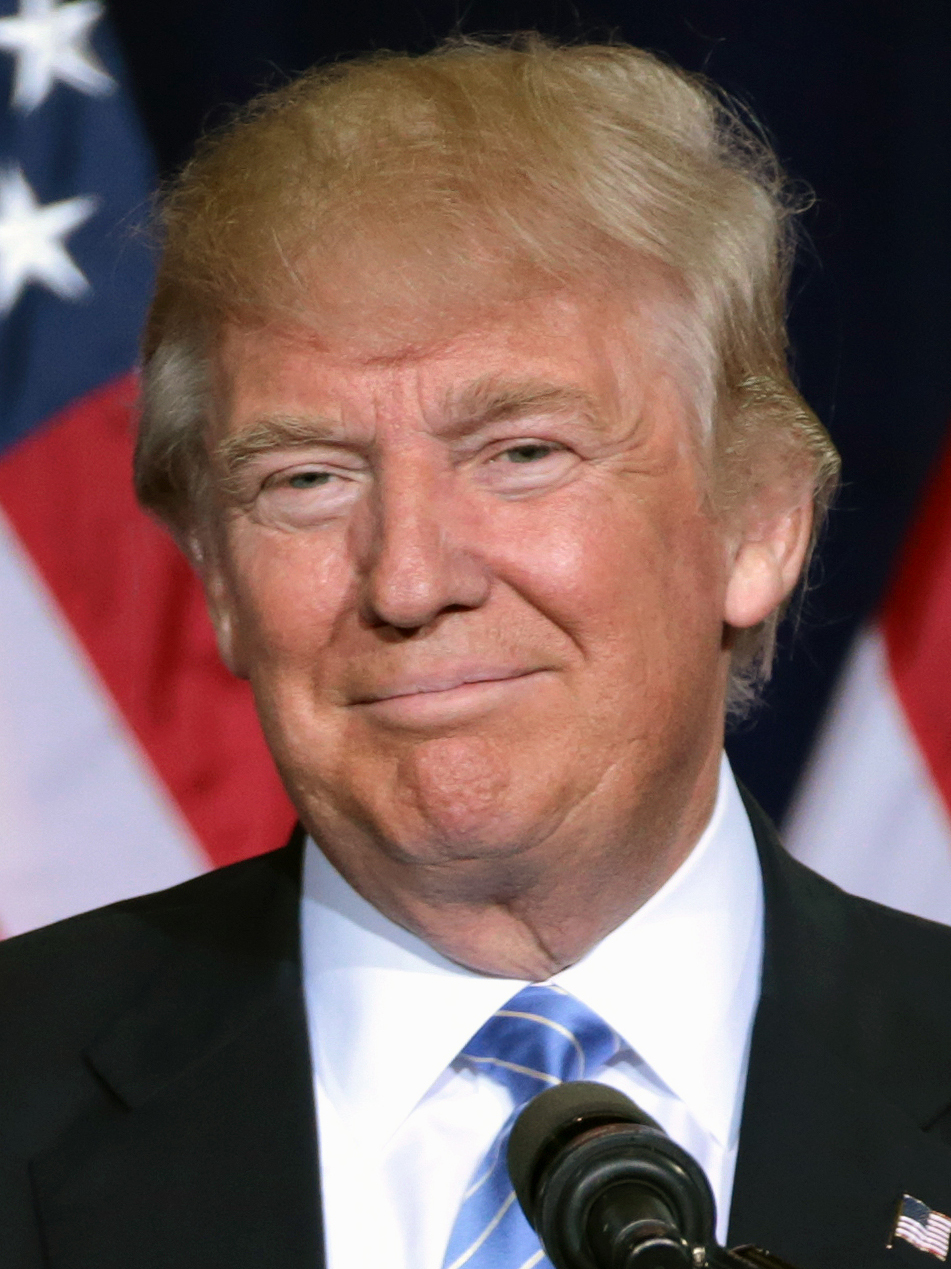

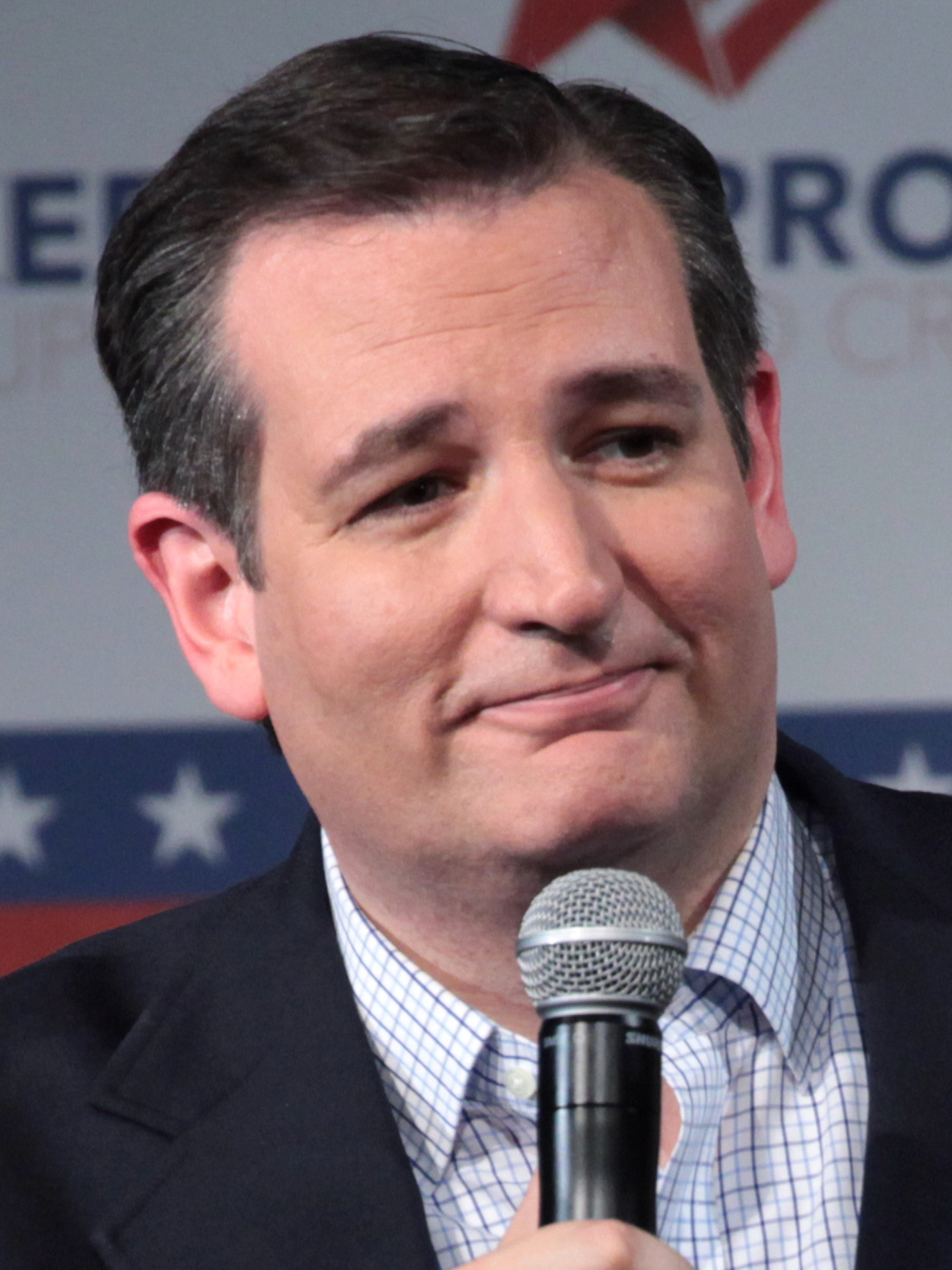

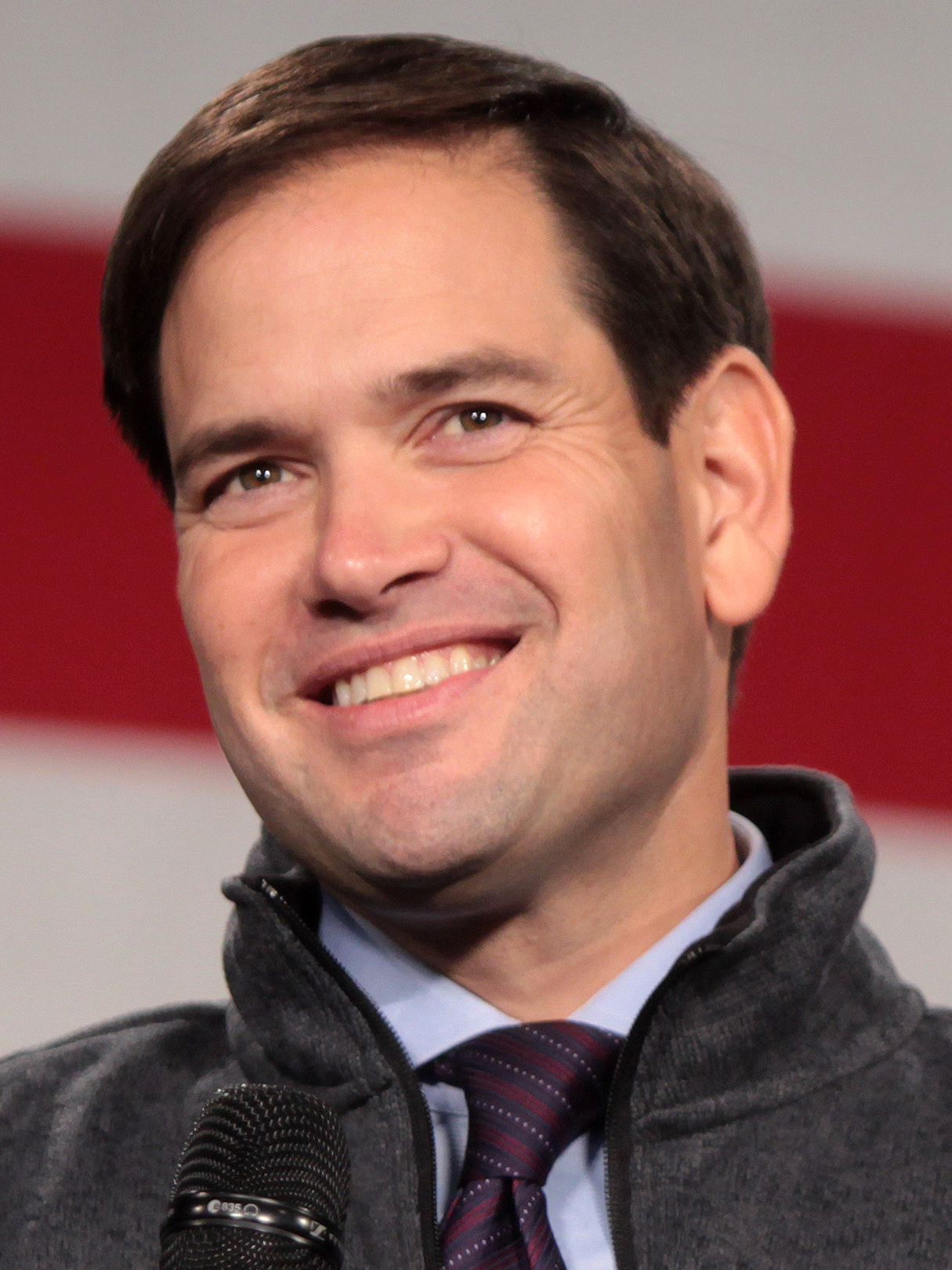

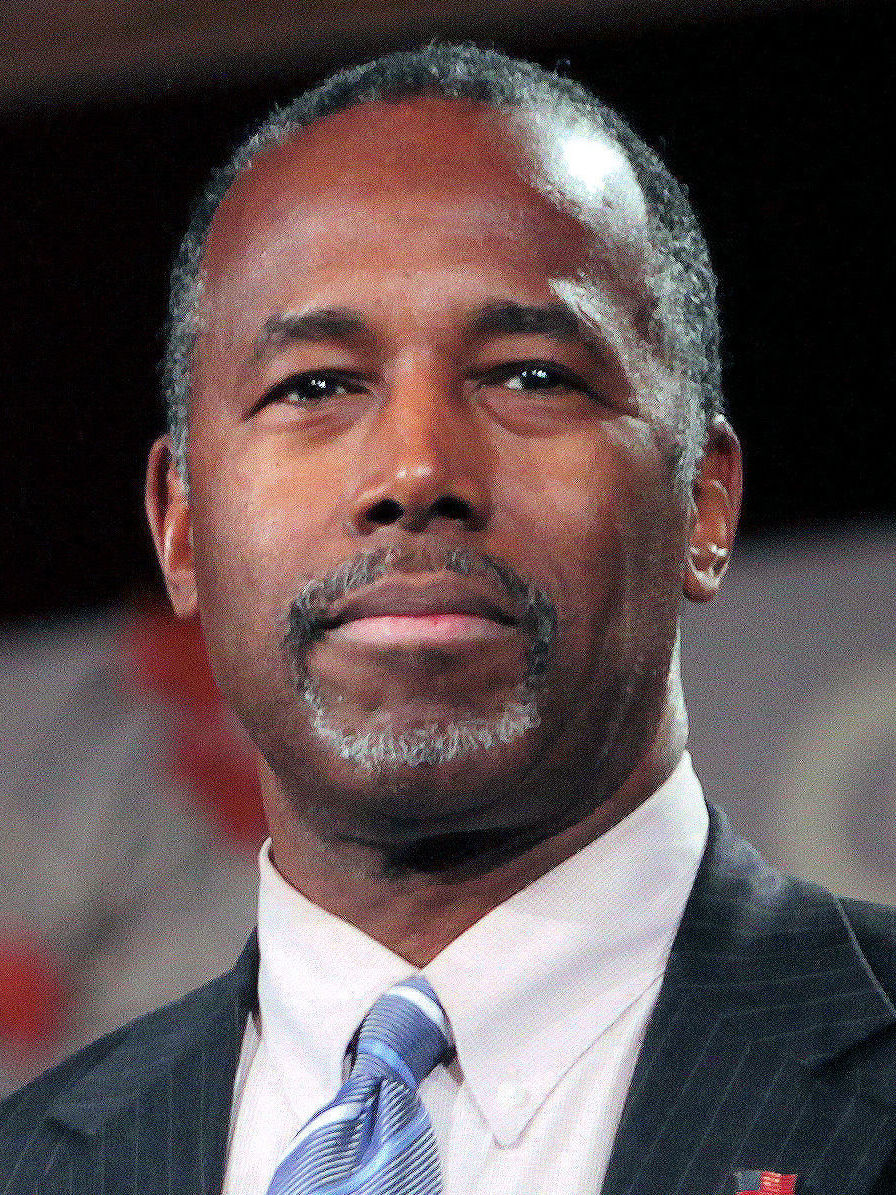

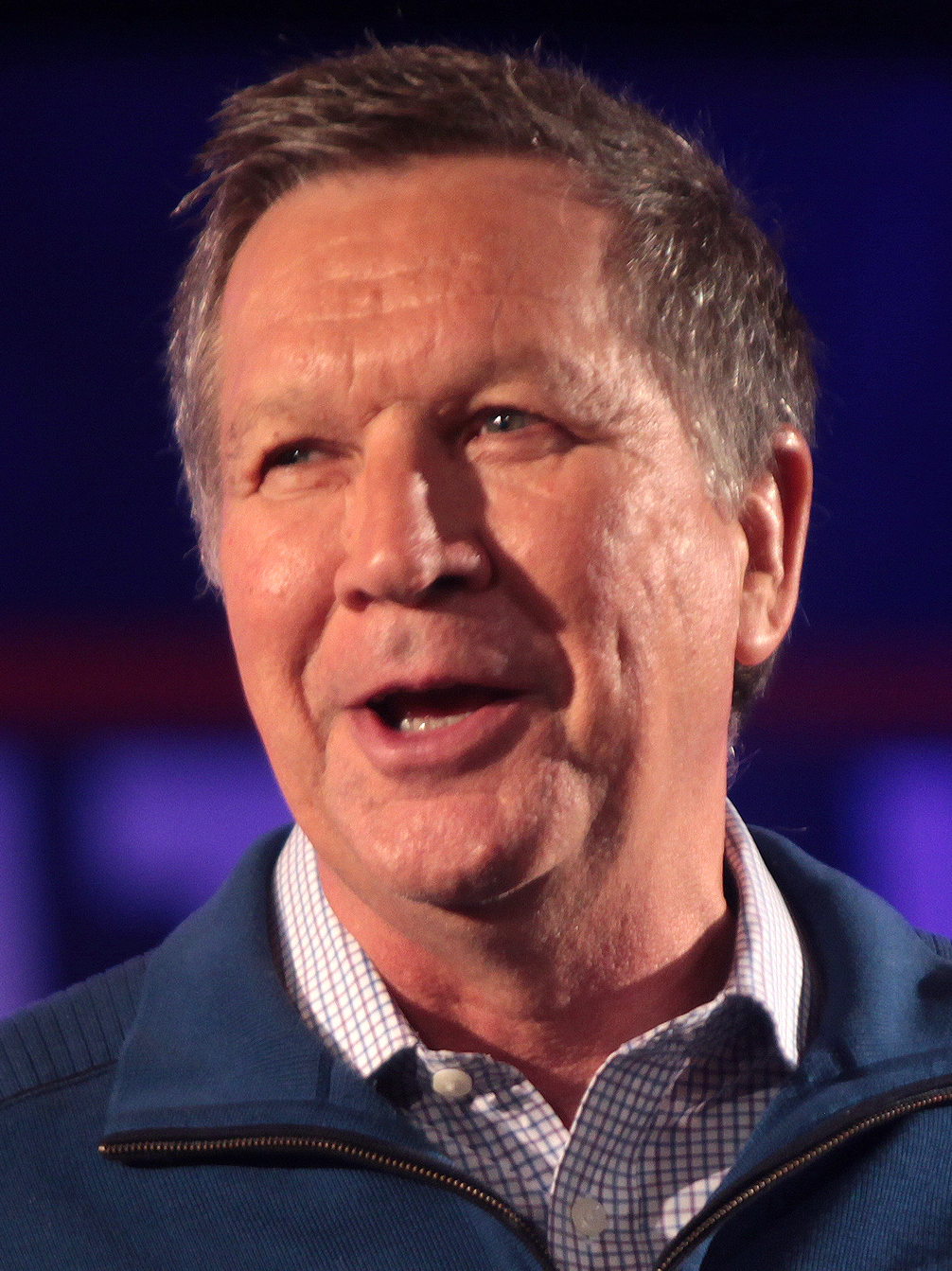
Candidate	Donald Trump	Ted Cruz	Marco Rubio
Home state	New York	Texas	Florida
Delegate count	42	18	16
Popular vote	502,994	305,847	316,836
Percentage	38.81%	23.60%	24.45%
Candidate	Ben Carson	John Kasich
Home state	Virginia	Ohio
Delegate count	0	0
Popular vote	80,723	72,508
Percentage	6.23%	5.59%

Donald Trump 30–40% 40–50% 50–60% 60–70%	Marco Rubio 30-40% 40–50%

The 2016 Georgia Republican presidential primary was held on Tuesday March 1, as part of that election cycle's Super Tuesday. It took place ahead of the presidential election that November, and the state's Democratic primary was held on the same day.

Donald Trump won the primary, with 38.8% of all votes cast. Marco Rubio came in second, with 24.5% of the vote, and Ted Cruz came in third, with 23.6% of the vote. Of Georgia's 76 bound delegates, Trump, Rubio, and Cruz took home 42, 16, and 18, respectively.

Evangelicals were a key voting bloc for Republican candidates in the primary, and Donald Trump won them handily.

== State of the campaign ==
Leading up to Super Tuesday, Trump was already the front-runner, thanks in part to his commanding victory in the South Carolina primary. Despite this, Trump still needed many more delegates to clinch the nomination, and the large number of delegates up for grabs on Super Tuesday made that day's contests especially important. Politico's Kyle Cheney noted that "Super Tuesday could cripple every Republican presidential candidate not named Donald Trump," while also observing that Trump would almost certainly remain ahead of all his Republican opponents after the day's primaries and caucuses.

Georgia's 76 delegates were the second-most of any state that held a Republican primary or caucus on Super Tuesday in 2016. This may have influenced Trump to hold a rally in Valdosta the day before Georgia's primary. Because Georgia requires candidates to reach a 20% threshold to receive any of its delegates, this was seen as potentially problematic for Cruz and Rubio, both of whom had been polling around that threshold in Georgia at the time. Nevertheless, there was speculation before Super Tuesday that Rubio would do better in Georgia's primary than in that day's other primaries.

== Delegate allocation ==
76 delegates were at stake in the Georgia Republican primary. Of these, 10 were at-large delegates, 42 were district delegates who each represented one of the state's 14 congressional districts, three were Republican Party leaders, and 21 were bonus delegates. The 42 delegates corresponding to Georgia congressional districts were all bound, whereas the remaining 34 were unbound. The delegates were awarded according to a winner-take-most system. The winner of each congressional district in the state received all three of that district's delegates if they received a majority of the vote in the district.

== Polling ==
=== Aggregate polls ===
Source of poll aggregation	Dates administered	Dates updated	Marco Rubio Republican	Donald Trump Republican	Ted Cruz Republican	Margin
RealClearPolitics	until March 1, 2016	March 1, 2016	22.4%	36.2%	22.2%	Trump +14.4
FiveThirtyEight	until March 1, 2016	March 1, 2016	22.3%	38.5%	21.0%	Trump +16.2

Polls conducted shortly before the Georgia primary gave Trump a double-digit lead over his opponents in the state. For instance, a poll conducted on February 28 by WSB-TV and Landmark Communications gave Trump a 19-point lead over his closest rival, Marco Rubio. A CBS News poll before the primary similarly found that Georgia Republicans "overwhelmingly" perceived Trump as being on the side of ordinary people, rather than wealthy donors, while they perceived Rubio in the opposite light.

Poll source	Date	1st	2nd	3rd	Other
Primary results	March 1, 2016	Donald Trump38.81%	Marco Rubio24.45%	Ted Cruz23.60%	Ben Carson 6.23%, John Kasich 5.69%, Jeb Bush 0.69%, Rand Paul 0.22%, Mike Huckabee 0.20%, Chris Christie 0.11%, Carly Fiorina 0.09%, Rick Santorum 0.04%, Lindsey Graham 0.03%, George Pataki 0.02%,
SurveyMonkey Margin of error: ± ?% Sample size: 1171	February 22–29, 2016	Donald Trump; 39%	Ted Cruz 21%	Marco Rubio 20%	Ben Carson 9%, John Kasich 6%, Undecided 6%
Landmark/RosettaStone Margin of error: ± 2.6% Sample size: 1400	February 28, 2016	Donald Trump; 39%	Marco Rubio 20%	Ted Cruz 15%	Ben Carson 9%, John Kasich 8%, Undecided 9%
Opinion Savvy/Fox 5 Atlanta Margin of error: ± 3.7% Sample size: 710	February 27–28, 2016	Donald Trump; 32.5%	Marco Rubio 23.2%	Ted Cruz 23.2%	John Kasich 10.7%, Ben Carson 6.1%, Undecided 4.3%
Trafalgar Group Margin of error: ± 3.14% Sample size: 1350	February 26–28, 2016	Donald Trump; 38.6%	Marco Rubio 23.54%	Ted Cruz 20.74%	John Kasich 7.03%, Ben Carson 6.14%, Undecided 3.95%
CBS/YouGov Margin of error: ± 7% Sample size: 493	February 22–26, 2016	Donald Trump; 40%	Ted Cruz 29%	Marco Rubio 22%	Ben Carson 7%, John Kasich 2%
ResearchNOW/WABE Margin of error: ± 4.1% Sample size: 400	February 22–24, 2016	Donald Trump; 41%	Marco Rubio 18%	Ted Cruz 15%	Ben Carson 8%, John Kasich 7%, Undecided 10%
SurveyUSA/TEGNA Margin of error: ± 3.8% Sample size: 684	February 22–23, 2016	Donald Trump; 45%	Marco Rubio 19%	Ted Cruz 16%	Ben Carson 8%, John Kasich 6%, Other 1%, Undecided 5%
Opinion Savvy/Fox 5 Atlanta Margin of error: ± 3.6% Sample size: 745	February 22–23, 2016	Donald Trump; 33.6%	Marco Rubio 22.2%	Ted Cruz 20.4%	John Kasich 8.9%, Ben Carson 7.7%, Undecided 7.2%
NBC News/Wall Street Journal/Marist Margin of error: ± 4.2% Sample size: 543	February 18–23, 2016	Donald Trump; 30%	Ted Cruz 23%	Marco Rubio 23%	Ben Carson 9%, John Kasich 9%
Landmark/RosettaStone Margin of error: ± 4.4% Sample size: 500	February 21, 2016	Donald Trump; 31.7%	Marco Rubio 22.7%	Ted Cruz 18.7%	Ben Carson 8.1%, John Kasich 7.9%, Undecided 10.9%
Landmark/RosettaStone Margin of error: ± 4.4% Sample size: 500	February 4, 2016	Donald Trump; 27.3%	Ted Cruz 18.3%	Marco Rubio 18.2%	Ben Carson 7.7%, John Kasich 4.4%, Chris Christie 3.9%, Jeb Bush 3.0%, Carly Fiorina 1.8%, Undecided 15.4%
CBS/YouGov Margin of error: ± 6.2% Sample size: 494	January 18–21, 2016	Donald Trump; 39%	Ted Cruz 29%	Marco Rubio 13%	Ben Carson 6%, Jeb Bush 2%, Chris Christie 2%, Carly Fiorina 2%, Mike Huckabee 2%, John Kasich 2%, Jim Gilmore 0%, Rand Paul 0%, Rick Santorum 0%, No preference 1%
Opinion Savvy/Fox 5 Atlanta Margin of error: ± 3.4% Sample size: 803	January 17, 2016	Donald Trump; 33.4%	Ted Cruz 23.4%	Marco Rubio 8.2%	Ben Carson 7.3%, Jeb Bush 7.1%, John Kasich 3.8%, Chris Christie 3.7%, Carly Fiorina 3.5%, Rand Paul 3.5%, Mike Huckabee 3.2%, Rick Santorum 0.1%, Undecided 2.7%
Opinion Savvy/Fox 5 Atlanta Margin of error: ± 4.2% Sample size: 538	December 16, 2015	Donald Trump; 34.6%	Ted Cruz 15.8%	Marco Rubio 12%	Ben Carson 6.4%, Jeb Bush 6%, Chris Christie 5.6%, Carly Fiorina 5.1%, John Kasich 2.3%, Rand Paul 2.1%, Lindsey Graham 1.4%, Mike Huckabee 1.4%, George Pataki 0.5%, Undecided 6.8%
WSB TV/Landmark Margin of error: ±3.3% Sample size: 800	December 10, 2015	Donald Trump; 43.3%	Ted Cruz 16.2%	Marco Rubio 10.6%	Ben Carson 6.7%, Jeb Bush 4.8%, Mike Huckabee 1.9%, Carly Fiorina 1.8%, John Kasich 1.5%, Rand Paul 0.5%, Undecided 12.9%
FOX 5/Morris News Margin of error: ±4.7% Sample size: 674	November 9–10, 2015	Ben Carson; 26%	Donald Trump; 24%	Ted Cruz 14%	Marco Rubio 9%, Jeb Bush 8%, Carly Fiorina 6%
WXIA-TV/SurveyUSA Margin of error: ±2% Sample size: 2,075	October 26, 2015	Donald Trump; 35%	Ben Carson 28%	Marco Rubio 12%	Ted Cruz 8%, Jeb Bush 4%, Carly Fiorina 3%, Mike Huckabee 3%, John Kasich 2%
WSB/Landmark Margin of error: ±4% Sample size: 600	September 23, 2015	Donald Trump; 30.8%	Ben Carson 17.9%	Carly Fiorina 13.2%	Marco Rubio 9.4%, Ted Cruz 7.9%, Jeb Bush 7.5%, Mike Huckabee 4.4%, John Kasich 1.9%, Rand Paul 1.1%, Undecided 5.9%
Opinion Savvy Margin of error: ±3.8% Sample size: 664	September 3, 2015	Donald Trump; 34.2%	Ben Carson 24.8%	Jeb Bush 10.9%	Ted Cruz 6.3%, Mike Huckabee 5.1%, Carly Fiorina 4.5%, John Kasich 2.5%, Marco Rubio 2.1%, Chris Christie 2%, Scott Walker 1.9%, Rick Perry 0.1%, Rick Santorum 0.1%, Bobby Jindal 0.1%, Lindsey Graham 0.1%, Rand Paul 0%, George Pataki 0%, Someone else 1.8%, Undecided 3.5%
WSB/Landmark Margin of error: ± 4.0% Sample size: 600	August 5, 2015	Donald Trump; 34.3%	Jeb Bush 12.0%	Scott Walker 10.4%	Mike Huckabee 8.1%, Ben Carson 8.1%, Ted Cruz 5.4%, John Kasich 4.5%, Marco Rubio 4.5%, Chris Christie 2.8%, Rand Paul 2.4%, Undecided 7.5%
5 Atlanta/Morris News Service Margin of error: ± 4.1% Sample size: 569	August 3, 2015	Donald Trump; 30.4%	Jeb Bush 17.3%	Ben Carson 9.6%	Mike Huckabee 6.5%, Ted Cruz 5.9%, Scott Walker 5%, Rand Paul 3.4%, Chris Christie 3.2%, Marco Rubio 3% John Kasich 2.8%, Carly Fiorina 2.5% Rick Perry 2.1% Bobby Jindal 1.7%, Lindsey Graham 0.4%, George Pataki 0.2%, Rick Santorum 0.1%, Other/No opinion 5.9%
Landmark Communications/Rosetta Stone Margin of error: ± 4.3% Sample size: 500	May 11–12, 2015	Mike Huckabee; 18.3%	Ben Carson; 15.4%	Scott Walker 12.6%	Jeb Bush 10.1%, Marco Rubio 9.6%, Ted Cruz 9.3%, Rand Paul 4%, Carly Fiorina 2.6%, Chris Christie 2.2%, Rick Santorum 0.3%, Other/No opinion 15.6%
Insider Advantage Margin of error: ± ? Sample size: 200	February 4, 2015	Jeb Bush; 21.5%	Scott Walker 17.3%	Mike Huckabee 16.4%	Ben Carson 15.5%, Rick Perry 7.2%, Rand Paul 3.9%, Marco Rubio 3.9%, Chris Christie 3%, Donald Trump 1.9%, Other/No opinion 9.5%

== Results ==
Georgia Republican primary, March 1, 2016
Candidate	Votes	Percentage	Actual delegate count		
Candidate	Votes	Percentage	Bound	Unbound	Total
Donald Trump	502,994	38.81%	42	0	42
Marco Rubio	316,836	24.45%	16	0	16
Ted Cruz	305,847	23.60%	18	0	18
Ben Carson	80,723	6.23%	0	0	0
John Kasich	72,508	5.59%	0	0	0
Jeb Bush (withdrawn)	7,686	0.59%	0	0	0
Rand Paul (withdrawn)	2,910	0.22%	0	0	0
Mike Huckabee (withdrawn)	2,625	0.20%	0	0	0
Chris Christie (withdrawn)	1,486	0.11%	0	0	0
Carly Fiorina (withdrawn)	1,146	0.09%	0	0	0
Rick Santorum (withdrawn)	539	0.04%	0	0	0
Lindsey Graham (withdrawn)	428	0.03%	0	0	0
George Pataki (withdrawn)	236	0.02%	0	0	0
Unprojected delegates:			0	0	0
Total:	1,295,964	100.00%	76	0	76
Source: The Green Papers

Trump won the Georgia primary with about half a million votes, representing 38.8% of all votes cast. He won 42 of the state's 76 delegates. Trump won 155 out of Georgia's 159 counties. The only four he did not win were Clarke, Cobb, DeKalb, and Fulton counties, all of which Rubio won comfortably. Trump's strongest performance was in Atkinson County, where he received 65.9% of the vote.

== Analysis ==
Trump's victory in the Georgia primary, as well as in most other Southern Super Tuesday contests, could be attributed to strong support from Evangelical voters. According to exit polls by Edison Research, Donald Trump carried 39% of Evangelical voters, compared to 26% for Ted Cruz. Notably, however, 37% of Georgia voters believed Ted Cruz, not Donald Trump, shared their values, while only 12% believed Trump did.

Many pundits were perplexed by Trump's dominance among culturally conservative Southern whites who were expected to view him as immoral, but he benefitted from voters' racial, cultural, and economic angst that mattered more than shared values.

Marco Rubio, who placed third in the Georgia primary, carried Atlanta and the suburban Atlanta metro, as well as the college town Clarke County, which contains the University of Georgia.
