= 2016 Georgia Democratic presidential primary =

- March 1, 2016

Candidate	Hillary Clinton	Bernie Sanders
Home state	New York	Vermont
Delegate count	73	29
Popular vote	545,674	215,797
Percentage	71.30%	28.20%
- Results by county Clinton: 40-50% 50-60% 60-70% 70-80% 80-90% >90% Sanders: 50-60%

The 2016 Georgia Democratic presidential primary took place on March 1 in the U.S. state of Georgia as one of the Democratic Party's primaries ahead of the 2016 presidential election. The primary was an open one.

On the same day, dubbed "Super Tuesday," Democratic primaries were held in ten other states plus American Samoa, while the Republican Party held primaries in eleven states, including their own Georgia primary.

Clinton won every county in the state, except for Echols County. She easily won Georgia in the primary by a wide margin of victory 43.10%. In 2008, Clinton lost the Georgia primary to then-senator from Illinois Barack Obama.

Clinton's overwhelming win was attributed mostly to the African American vote, and her endorsement from civil rights icon Congressman John Lewis.

== Opinion polling ==
Poll source	Date	1st	2nd	Other
Primary results	March 1, 2016	Hillary Clinton; 71.3%	Bernie Sanders; 28.2%	Other 0.5%
SurveyMonkey Margin of error: ± ? Sample size: 961	February 22–29, 2016	Hillary Clinton; 59%	Bernie Sanders; 36%	Others / Undecided 5%
WSB-TV/Landmark Margin of error: ± 3.5; Sample size: 800	February 28, 2016	Hillary Clinton; 70%	Bernie Sanders; 23%	Others / Undecided 7%
WSB-TV/Landmark Margin of error: ± 3.5% Sample size: 800	February 26, 2016	Hillary Clinton; 68%	Bernie Sanders; 22%	Others / Undecided; 10%
YouGov/CBS News Margin of error: ± 8.6% Sample size: 492	February 22–26, 2016	Hillary Clinton; 63%	Bernie Sanders; 35%	Others / Undecided 2%
WABE 90.1 Margin of error: ± 4.1% Sample size: 400	February 22–24, 2016	Hillary Clinton; 62%	Bernie Sanders; 29%	Others / Undecided 9%
TEGNA/SurveyUSA Margin of error: ± 4.2% Sample size: 501	February 22–23, 2016	Hillary Clinton; 66%	Bernie Sanders; 27%	Others / Undecided 7%
FOX 5 Atlanta Margin of error: ± 4.4% Sample size: 491	February 22–23, 2016	Hillary Clinton; 57%	Bernie Sanders; 29%	Others / Undecided 14%
NBC News/Wall St. Jrnl Margin of error: ± 4.6% Sample size: 461	February 18–23, 2016	Hillary Clinton; 64%	Bernie Sanders; 30%	Others / Undecided 6%
WSB-TV/Landmark Margin of error: ± 3.7% Sample size: 700	February 21, 2016	Hillary Clinton; 72%	Bernie Sanders; 20%	Others / Undecided 8%
Public Policy Polling Margin of error: ± 4.4% Sample size: 500	February 14–16, 2016	Hillary Clinton; 60%	Bernie Sanders; 26%	
Landmark/RosettaStone Margin of error: ± 4.0% Sample size: 600	February 4, 2016	Hillary Clinton; 63.3%	Bernie Sanders; 21.5%	Undecided 15.2%
WXIA-TV/SurveyUSA Margin of error: ± 4.8% Sample size: 2075	October 15–26, 2015	Hillary Clinton; 73%	Bernie Sanders; 16%	Martin O'Malley 4% Undecided 5%
Opinion Savvy Margin of error: ± 4.8; Sample size: 413	Published September 3, 2015	Hillary Clinton; 51%	Bernie Sanders; 24%	Joe Biden 15% Lincoln Chafee 5% Martin O'Malley 0% Jim Webb 0% Someone else 1% Undecided 5%

== Results ==
Primary date: March 1, 2016
National delegates: 60

2016 Democratic Party's presidential nominating process in Georgia – Summary of results –
Candidate	Popular vote		Estimated delegates		
Candidate	Count	Percentage	Pledged	Unpledged	Total
Hillary Clinton	545,674	71.30%	73	11	84
Bernie Sanders	215,797	28.20%	29	0	29
Martin O'Malley (withdrawn)	2,129	0.28%			
Michael Steinberg	1,766	0.23%			
Uncommitted	—N/a		0	4	4
Total	765,366	100%	102	15	117

Georgia Democratic primary, March 1, 2016
District	Delegates available	Votes						Delegates	
District	Delegates available	Clinton	Sanders	O'Malley	Steinberg	Total	Qualified total	Clinton	Sanders
1	5	32,408	12,343	180	166	45,097	44,751	4	1
2	5	48,705	8,817	185	168	57,875	57,522	4	1
3	4	30,311	11,691	160	135	42,297	42,002	3	1
4	6	73,739	23,827	148	105	97,819	97,566	5	1
5	7	81,636	32,474	176	89	114,375	114,110	5	2
6	5	34,287	22,632	133	60	57,112	56,919	3	2
7	4	27,483	15,461	106	63	43,113	42,944	3	1
8	4	27,632	8,539	168	153	36,492	36,171	3	1
9	4	14,263	9,727	146	130	24,266	23,990	2	2
10	4	33,303	15,274	142	169	48,888	48,577	3	1
11	4	26,137	17,511	123	89	43,860	43,648	2	2
12	5	33,308	9,361	176	151	42,996	42,669	4	1
13	6	68,652	19,128	152	114	88,046	87,780	5	1
14	4	13,810	9,012	134	174	23,130	22,822	2	2
Total	67	545,674	215,797	2,129	1,766	765,366	761,471	48	19
PLEO	13	545,674	215,797	2,129	1,766	765,366	761,471	9	4
At large	22	545,674	215,797	2,129	1,766	765,366	761,471	16	6
Gr. Total	102	545,674	215,797	2,129	1,766	765,366	761,471	73	29
Total vote		71.30%	28.20%	0.28%	0.23%	100.00%	99,49%		
Source: Georgia Secretary of State Presidential Preference Primary Congressional District Results (Democrat)

=== Results by county ===
County	Clinton	Votes	Sanders	Votes
Appling	75.6%	490	21.9%	142
Atkinson	79.8%	201	19.4%	49
Bacon	63.8%	113	32.8%	58
Baker	85.1%	303	13.5%	48
Baldwin	79.4%	3,034	19.9%	762
Banks	49.0%	172	48.1%	169
Barrow	61.7%	1,457	37.2%	879
Bartow	59.0%	2,216	39.7%	1,490
Ben Hill	80.2%	779	18.4%	179
Berrien	66.7%	325	30.0%	146
Bibb	82.8%	12,944	16.8%	2,632
Bleckley	77.7%	370	20.6%	98
Brantley	49.1%	137	44.1%	123
Brooks	77.6%	714	21.5%	198
Bryan	63.3%	893	35.5%	501
Bulloch	60.7%	1,910	38.8%	1,221
Burke	89.5%	1,659	9.9%	184
Butts	81.7%	922	16.9%	191
Calhoun	88.9%	499	10.9%	61
Camden	66.6%	1,405	32.6%	688
Candler	78.3%	434	19.9%	110
Carroll	61.7%	3,173	37.6%	1,933
Catoosa	50.8%	1,082	48.1%	1,026
Charlton	73.7%	275	22.5%	84
Chatham	72.3%	19,898	27.2%	7,496
Chattahoochee	81.3%	182	17.9%	40
Chattooga	63.7%	566	34.0%	302
Cherokee	51.8%	4,837	47.6%	4,438
Clarke	50.7%	7,089	49.0%	6,845
Clay	85.8%	297	12.7%	44
Clayton	81.6%	25,130	18.0%	5,551
Clinch	79.5%	167	18.1%	38
Cobb	63.5%	39,277	36.2%	22,390
Coffee	77.0%	1,094	21.7%	309
Colquitt	76.1%	1,035	22.2%	302
Columbia	66.9%	4,805	32.5%	2,333
Cook	76.2%	580	22.5%	171
Coweta	66.5%	4,536	32.7%	2,233
Crawford	79.1%	493	19.3%	120
Crisp	80.1%	729	18.9%	172
Dade	50.3%	241	48.0%	230
Dawson	53.0%	312	45.5%	268
Decatur	79.0%	1,316	20.0%	333
DeKalb	71.5%	82,348	28.3%	32,572
Dodge	79.5%	579	19.4%	141
Dooly	88.4%	737	10.9%	91
Dougherty	85.7%	8,891	13.8%	1,435
Douglas	74.6%	9,375	25.0%	3,139
Early	89.2%	671	10.1%	76
Echols	45.7%	32	51.4%	36
Effingham	64.5%	1,178	33.9%	620
Elbert	75.0%	805	24.0%	257
Emanuel	83.1%	755	15.9%	144
Evans	78.5%	347	19.2%	85
Fannin	59.9%	545	39.1%	356
Fayette	71.1%	7,257	28.6%	2,918
Floyd	64.5%	2,555	34.2%	1,356
Forsyth	53.8%	3,701	45.7%	3,142
Franklin	62.7%	352	36.2%	203
Fulton	71.1%	82,576	28.7%	33,320
Gilmer	53.0%	489	45.7%	421
Glascock	62.3%	38	31.1%	19
Glynn	68.7%	2,870	30.6%	1,277
Gordon	57.5%	776	41.0%	553
Grady	75.9%	887	22.3%	261
Greene	85.8%	37,465	33.4%	18,883
Gwinnett	66.2%	1,076	13.5%	169
Habersham	52.0%	608	47.3%	553
Hall	60.3%	3,482	38.9%	2,245
Hancock	87.4%	1,112	11.4%	145
Haralson	55.1%	413	41.5%	311
Harris	75.0%	1,372	24.5%	448
Hart	72.3%	740	27.0%	276
Heard	70.1%	276	28.2%	111
Henry	77.7%	15,639	21.9%	4,406
Houston	76.0%	6,274	23.6%	1,946
Irwin	79.9%	326	18.1%	74
Jackson	61.4%	1,193	37.5%	729
Jasper	81.4%	632	17.1%	133
Jeff Davis	76.6%	400	20.3%	106
Jefferson	88.5%	1,519	11.0%	189
Jenkins	84.1%	355	15.2%	64
Johnson	85.1%	388	14.0%	64
Jones	80.2%	1,585	18.8%	371
Lamar	79.9%	868	19.1%	208
Lanier	76.5%	234	22.5%	69
Laurens	82.2%	2,294	16.2%	453
Lee	74.2%	1,009	24.6%	335
Liberty	79.7%	2,783	19.4%	678
Lincoln	84.5%	538	14.6%	93
Long	68.5%	261	29.1%	111
Lowndes	68.0%	3,891	31.3%	1,791
Lumpkin	50.6%	560	48.1%	532
Macon	89.9%	977	9.7%	105
Madison	55.7%	656	42.9%	505
Marion	76.3%	431	21.2%	120
McDuffie	84.7%	1,274	14.8%	223
McIntosh	84.4%	863	14.6%	149
Meriwether	85.4%	1,463	13.8%	237
Miller	77.6%	159	18.0%	37
Mitchell	85.8%	1,338	13.0%	203
Monroe	80.1%	1,250	19.2%	300
Montgomery	78.2%	287	19.6%	72
Morgan	77.5%	910	22.1%	259
Murray	51.2%	444	46.9%	407
Muscogee	79.1%	12,801	20.5%	3,319
Newton	78.0%	7,269	21.5%	2,001
Oconee	52.5%	1,223	47.1%	1,098
Oglethorpe	60.5%	561	38.6%	358
Paulding	65.6%	4,095	33.8%	2,111
Peach	83.7%	1,675	15.8%	316
Pickens	53.1%	431	45.6%	370
Pierce	67.0%	219	31.8%	104
Pike	68.4%	417	30.7%	187
Polk	68.6%	944	29.3%	403
Pulaski	86.0%	376	13.7%	60
Putnam	80.2%	871	19.0%	206
Quitman	91.0%	193	7.1%	15
Rabun	54.1%	397	44.4%	326
Randolph	89.5%	690	9.2%	71
Richmond	81.7%	16,269	18.0%	3,578
Rockdale	78.0%	7,930	21.8%	2,212
Schley	83.4%	146	14.3%	25
Screven	81.1%	771	17.5%	166
Seminole	84.4%	470	14.5%	81
Spalding	78.6%	3,129	20.6%	820
Stephens	60.7%	460	9.0%	284
Stewart	90.0%	460	9.0%	46
Sumter	82.4%	1,960	17.0%	404
Talbot	86.7%	852	12.2%	120
Taliaferro	86.4%	236	12.8%	35
Tattnall	76.1%	518	22.5%	153
Taylor	87.7%	476	11.4%	62
Telfair	81.1%	426	17.3%	91
Terrell	88.1%	804	11.5%	105
Thomas	78.2%	2,053	21.0%	551
Tift	75.9%	1,151	22.7%	344
Toombs	76.2%	562	22.5%	166
Towns	52.9%	312	45.1%	266
Treutlen	82.2%	300	15.9%	58
Troup	78.9%	3,357	20.0%	850
Turner	78.9%	330	19.4%	81
Twiggs	86.4%	818	12.5%	118
Union	56.3%	573	41.0%	417
Upson	80.8%	1,236	18.3%	280
Walker	53.0%	1,009	45.5%	867
Walton	69.9%	2,309	29.4%	969
Ware	75.0%	919	23.2%	284
Warren	89.5%	468	9.4%	49
Washington	86.4%	1,741	12.7%	256
Wayne	73.2%	700	24.7%	236
Webster	89.5%	170	9.5%	18
Wheeler	85.9%	177	12.6%	26
White	52.4%	498	46.3%	440
Whitfield	53.3%	1,536	45.4%	1,307
Wilcox	86.8%	302	11.8%	41
Wilkes	82.1%	702	16.5%	141
Wilkinson	83.3%	832	15.5%	155
Worth	79.4%	684	19.3%	166
Total	71.3%	543,008	28.2%	214,332

== Analysis ==
After losing in Georgia by 36 points to Barack Obama in 2008, Hillary Clinton bounced back with a lopsided 43-point win against rival Bernie Sanders. The victory was fueled primarily by African American voters, who comprised 51% of the electorate and backed Clinton by a margin of 85-14, compared to white voters, who backed Clinton by a margin of 58-41. Clinton won across all income levels and educational attainment levels in Georgia.

Clinton performed extremely well throughout the state of Georgia and won all of its counties but one. She ran particularly strongly in Atlanta where she won 74 percent of the vote as well as its suburbs which backed her 66-34. Central Georgia, particularly the region known as the Cotton Belt, which has a large African American population, also strongly favored Clinton by a margin of 79-19. Clinton also performed well in North Georgia, mostly in the more rural, white and conservative parts of the state which are considered to be an extreme part of Appalachia, where she defeated Sanders by a margin of 64-36.

After his landslide defeat, the Sanders campaign reported that Hillary Clinton had notched wins in southern states including Georgia because Bernie Sanders did not compete with her, although this claim was disputed.^{[6]}
