= Marion, Georgia =

Unincorporated community in Georgia, U.S.

Coordinates: 32°39′44.52″N 83°26′13.63″W

Marion is an unincorporated community in Twiggs County, in the U.S. state of Georgia.

== History ==
The community was named after Francis Marion (c. 1732–1795), army officer during the American Revolutionary War, known as the Swamp Fox. Marion was once the county seat of Twiggs County.

The Georgia General Assembly incorporated Marion as a town in 1816; the town's municipal charter was repealed in 1834. A post office was established at Marion in 1812, and remained in operation until 1868.
