= Twiggs County School District =

School district in Georgia (U.S. state)

Address
- 952 Main Street Jeffersonville, Georgia, 31044-3727; United States
- Coordinates: 32.678869°N 83.331553°W

District information
- Grades: Pre-school - 12
- Superintendent: Dr. Mack Bullard
- Accreditations: Southern Association of Colleges and Schools; Georgia Accrediting Commission

Students and staff
- Enrollment: 1,489
- Faculty: 100

Other information
- Telephone: (478) 945-3127
- Fax: (478) 945-3078
- Website: www.twiggs.k12.ga.us

The Twiggs County School District is a public school district in Twiggs County, Georgia, United States, based in Jeffersonville.

The only school district in the county, it serves the communities of Allentown, Danville, and Jeffersonville.

== Schools ==
The Twiggs County School District has one elementary school, one middle school, and one high school.

Schools:

- Jeffersonville Elementary School
- Twiggs Middle School
- Twiggs County High School
