= Fitzpatrick, Georgia =

Unincorporated community in Georgia, U.S.

Coordinates: 32°44′56″N 83°26′15″W

Fitzpatrick is an unincorporated community in Twiggs County, in the U.S. state of Georgia.

== History ==
A variant name was "Elmwood". A post office called Elmwood was established in 1879, the name was changed to Fitzpatrick in 1891, and the post office closed in 1934. The community was named after Benjamin S. Fitzpatrick, an early settler.
