= Dry Branch, Georgia =

Dry Branch
- Unincorporated community
- Location within the state of Georgia Dry Branch (the United States)
- Coordinates: 32°48′02″N 83°29′55″W
- Country: United States
- State: Georgia
- Counties: Twiggs, Bibb
- Elevation: 361 ft (110 m)
- Time zone: UTC-5 (Eastern (EST))
  - Summer (DST): UTC-4 (EDT)
- ZIP codes: 31020
- Area code: 478
- GNIS ID: 355553

Dry Branch (also, Pikes Peak) is an unincorporated community located in Twiggs and Bibb counties, Georgia, United States. Its ZIP code is 31217. The area covered by the ZIP code has a population of 3,198 and contains 100.81 square miles of land and is 0.4% water.

== History ==
The first permanent settlement at Dry Branch was made in 1808. A post office has been in operation at Dry Branch since 1879. According to tradition, the community was so named on account of it being dry.
