= Twiggs Academy =

Private Christian school in Jeffersonville, Georgia, United States

Location
- 961 Hamlin Floyd Road; Jeffersonville, (Twiggs County), Georgia 31044; United States; 32°37′20″N 83°20′42″W

Information
- Type: Private Christian
- Established: 1970; 56 years ago
- Principal: Denise Warren
- Grades: K–12
- Average class size: 12.5
- Colors: Green and gold
- Sports: Baseball, basketball, football, softball, track & field
- Mascot: Trojan
- Accreditation: Georgia Accrediting Commission
- Communities served: Twiggs and surrounding counties
- Website: Twiggs Academy

Twiggs Academy is a private Christian school near Jeffersonville, Georgia that was founded in 1970 as a segregation academy. Classes are offered for kindergarten through twelfth grade in a traditional classroom setting.

The current head of school is Denise Warren.

Twiggs Academy is a member of the Georgia Independent School Association.

== History ==
Twiggs Academy was established in 1970 as a segregation academy At a 1970 fundraiser for the school, Georgia governor Lester Maddox urged "citizens, local officials, church leaders and educators in every community where the federal police has moved in to destroy public education to move immediately to organize, develop and do what they must to provide their own system of education."

Twiggs Academy was one of forty-one private schools chartered in Georgia between October 1969, and June 1970.

As of 2021, the school does not report statistics to the National Center for Education Statistics.

== Student Activities ==
=== Athletics ===
Twiggs Academy competes in baseball, men's and women's basketball, football, softball, and track. Twiggs Academy participates in the Georgia Independent School Association (GISA), and the Independent Christian Schools of Georgia and Alabama (ICSGA). The Trojans are a member of GISA Region 2 A.

Twiggs Academy has won GISA Championships:

- 1980-1981 Men's Basketball. Class A.
- 1981-1982 Women's Basketball. Class A.
- 1993-1994 Softball. Class AA.
- 1995-1996 Softball. Class AA.
- 1996-1997 Softball. Class AA.
- 2001-2002 Women's Basketball. Class AA.

==== Football ====
Although Twiggs Academy competes in GISA in all other sports, the Trojans play football in the Independent Christian Schools of Georgia and Alabama, a Christian league consisting of teams from Georgia, Florida, and Alabama.

Previously Twiggs Academy played football in GISA. The Trojans fell to Eagle's Landing Christian Academy in the 1996-1997 GISA Championship game.

==== Rivalry ====
Historically, Twiggs Academy's biggest rivalries have been with Citizens Christian Academy. In the mid-90s TA also had rivalries with Flint River Academy and Fullington Academy.

=== Literary ===
Twiggs Academy competes in GISA literary competition including events such as oral interpretation, extemporaneous speaking, trio, quartet, solo, and essay.

Twiggs Academy won its region in literary in 1994 and 1995.

=== One-act play ===
Twiggs Academy competes in GISA one-act play and won the event in its region in 2009.

Twiggs Academy won state in Class A of one-act plays in 2010.

== Campus ==
A large gymnasium; a modern media center and science lab; a library; baseball, softball, and football fields; and a cafeteria are located on campus.
