= Twiggs County, Georgia =

County in Georgia, United States

- County
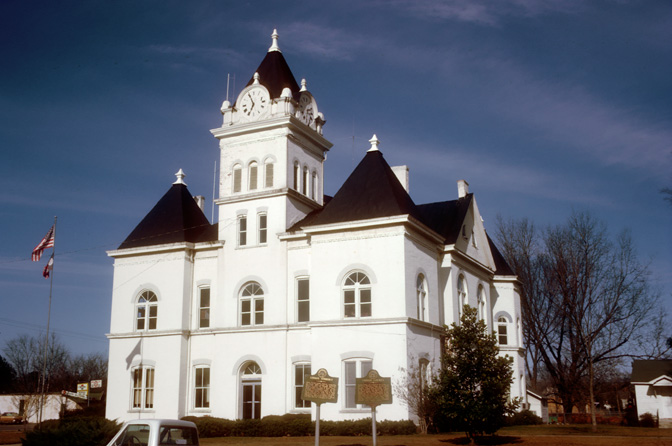
- Twiggs County Courthouse, Jeffersonville, in 1975

- Location within the U.S. state of Georgia
- Coordinates: 32°40′N 83°26′W
- Country: United States
- State: Georgia
- Founded: December 14, 1809; 216 years ago
- Named for: John Twiggs
- Seat: Jeffersonville
- Largest city: Jeffersonville

Area
  - Total: 363 sq mi (940 km^{2})
  - Land: 358 sq mi (930 km^{2})
  - Water: 4.2 sq mi (11 km^{2}) 1.2%

Population (2020)
  - Total: 8,022
  - Estimate (2025): 7,597 ▼
  - Density: 22/sq mi (8.5/km^{2})
- Time zone: UTC−5 (Eastern)
  - Summer (DST): UTC−4 (EDT)
- Congressional district: 8th
- Website: www.twiggscounty.us

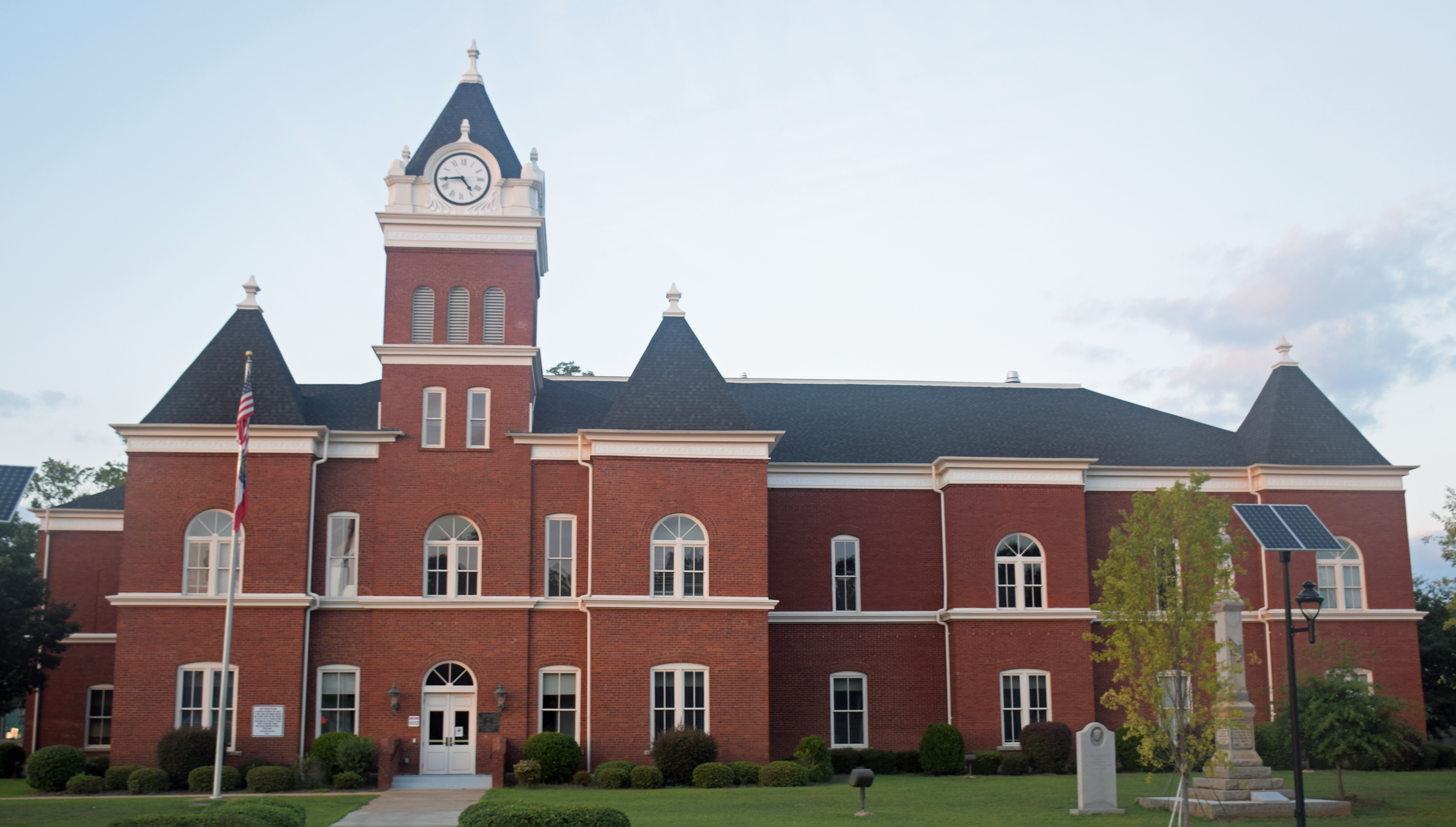
Courthouse in 2015

Twiggs County is a county located in the central portion of the U.S. state of Georgia. As of the 2020 census, the population was 8,022. The county seat is Jeffersonville. The county was created on December 14, 1809, and named for American Revolutionary War general John Twiggs.

Twiggs County is included in the Macon, GA metropolitan statistical area. The Twiggs County Courthouse is located in Jeffersonville.

== Geography ==
According to the U.S. Census Bureau, the county has a total area of 363 square miles (940 km^{2}), of which 358 square miles (930 km^{2}) is land and 4.2 square miles (11 km^{2}) (1.2%) is water.

Due to its location on the fall line, the county boasts a diverse geography. Northern parts of the county tend to be hillier, being part of the Piedmont region, and southern parts of the county tend to be flatter, being part of the upper Atlantic coastal plain.

The geographical center of Georgia lies in Twiggs County — off Bullard Road near Old Marion.

The southwestern and central portion of Twiggs County, south of Dry Branch and west of Jeffersonville, is located in the Lower Ocmulgee River sub-basin of the Altamaha River basin. A narrow northwestern portion of the county, from just north to southwest of Dry Branch, is located in the Upper Ocmulgee River sub-basin of the Altamaha River basin. The entire eastern edge of the county is located in the Lower Oconee River sub-basin of the same Altamaha River basin, with a small triangular portion of Twiggs County, south of Interstate 16 and west of Danville, located in the Little Ocmulgee River sub-basin of the same larger Altamaha River basin.

=== Major highways ===
- I-16 / SR 404 (unsigned)
- US 23 / US 129 Alt. / SR 87
- US 80 / SR 19
- SR 18
- SR 57 / SR 540 (Fall Line Freeway)
- SR 96
- SR 112
- SR 358

=== Adjacent counties ===
- Wilkinson County - northeast
- Laurens County - southeast
- Bleckley County - south
- Houston County - southwest
- Bibb County - west
- Jones County - northwest

=== National protected area ===
- Bond Swamp National Wildlife Refuge (part)

== Communities ==
=== Cities ===
- Allentown (partly in Wilkinson County, Laurens County, and Bleckley County)
- Jeffersonville (county seat)

=== Town ===
- Danville (partly in Wilkinson County)

=== Unincorporated community ===
- Dry Branch (partly in Bibb County)

== Demographics ==
Historical population
Census	Pop.	Note	%±
1810	3,405		—
1820	10,640		212.5%
1830	8,031		−24.5%
1840	8,422		4.9%
1850	8,179		−2.9%
1860	8,320		1.7%
1870	8,545		2.7%
1880	8,918		4.4%
1890	8,195		−8.1%
1900	8,716		6.4%
1910	10,736		23.2%
1920	10,407		−3.1%
1930	8,372		−19.6%
1940	9,117		8.9%
1950	8,308		−8.9%
1960	7,935		−4.5%
1970	8,222		3.6%
1980	9,354		13.8%
1990	9,806		4.8%
2000	10,590		8.0%
2010	9,023		−14.8%
2020	8,022		−11.1%
2025 (est.)	7,597	▼	−5.3%
U.S. Decennial Census; 1790-1880 1890-1910; 1920-1930 1930-1940; 1940-1950 1960-1980; 1980-2000 2010

=== Racial and ethnic composition ===
Twiggs County, Georgia – Racial and ethnic composition Note: the US Census treats Hispanic/Latino as an ethnic category. This table excludes Latinos from the racial categories and assigns them to a separate category. Hispanics/Latinos may be of any race.
Race / Ethnicity (NH = Non-Hispanic)	Pop 1980	Pop 1990	Pop 2000	Pop 2010	Pop 2020	% 1980	% 1990	% 2000	% 2010	% 2020
White alone (NH)	4,571	5,266	5,784	5,059	4,487	48.87%	53.70%	54.62%	56.07%	55.93%
Black or African American alone (NH)	4,639	4,480	4,589	3,703	3,099	49.59%	45.69%	43.33%	41.04%	38.63%
Native American or Alaska Native alone (NH)	7	8	21	27	16	0.07%	0.08%	0.20%	0.30%	0.20%
Asian alone (NH)	5	6	11	14	37	0.05%	0.06%	0.10%	0.16%	0.46%
Native Hawaiian or Pacific Islander alone (NH)	x	x	3	1	0	x	x	0.03%	0.01%	0.00%
Other race alone (NH)	0	0	2	6	18	0.00%	0.00%	0.02%	0.07%	0.22%
Mixed race or Multiracial (NH)	x	x	68	89	241	x	x	0.64%	0.99%	3.00%
Hispanic or Latino (any race)	132	46	112	124	124	1.41%	0.47%	1.06%	1.37%	1.55%
Total	9,354	9,806	10,590	9,023	8,022	100.00%	100.00%	100.00%	100.00%	100.00%

=== 2020 census ===
As of the 2020 census, the county had a population of 8,022, and the median age was 50.1 years. 17.9% of residents were under the age of 18 and 23.9% were 65 years of age or older. For every 100 females there were 94.2 males, and for every 100 females age 18 and over there were 93.9 males age 18 and over. 0.0% of residents lived in urban areas, while 100.0% lived in rural areas.

The racial makeup of the county was 56.4% White, 38.9% Black or African American, 0.3% American Indian and Alaska Native, 0.5% Asian, 0.0% Native Hawaiian and Pacific Islander, 0.5% from some other race, and 3.5% from two or more races. Hispanic or Latino residents of any race comprised 1.5% of the population.

There were 3,387 households in the county, of which 24.3% had children under the age of 18 living with them and 30.7% had a female householder with no spouse or partner present. About 29.7% of all households were made up of individuals and 14.0% had someone living alone who was 65 years of age or older.

There were 4,028 housing units, of which 15.9% were vacant. Among occupied housing units, 79.7% were owner-occupied and 20.3% were renter-occupied. The homeowner vacancy rate was 0.6% and the rental vacancy rate was 6.8%.

== Education ==
The Twiggs County School District is the sole school district in the county. It includes Jefersonville Elementary and Twiggs County Comprehensive Middle/High School.

Private schools:

- Twiggs Academy

== Notable people ==
- Philip Cook, Confederate general in the Civil War and postbellum U.S. Congressman.
- Darqueze Dennard, cornerback for the Cincinnati Bengals of the National Football League and former cornerback for the Michigan State Spartans football team. He was the winner of the 2013 Jim Thorpe Award.
- Dudley Mays Hughes, member of the U.S. House of Representatives, American politician, farmer and railroad executive.
- Chuck Leavell, an American musician and current tree farmer in Twiggs County, who was a member of The Allman Brothers Band during the height of their 1970s popularity, a founding member of the jazz-rock combo Sea Level, a frequently-employed session musician, and long-time touring member and musical director of The Rolling Stones.

== Politics ==
For elections to the United States House of Representatives, Twiggs County is part of Georgia's 8th congressional district, currently represented by Austin Scott. For elections to the Georgia State Senate, Twiggs County is part of District 26. For elections to the Georgia House of Representatives, Twiggs County is part of District 133.

United States presidential election results for Twiggs County, Georgia
Year	Republican		Democratic		Third party(ies)	
Year	No.	%	No.	%	No.	%
1912	3	0.92%	310	95.09%	13	3.99%
1916	15	3.75%	365	91.25%	20	5.00%
1920	44	13.88%	273	86.12%	0	0.00%
1924	39	8.02%	417	85.80%	30	6.17%
1928	74	11.47%	571	88.53%	0	0.00%
1932	15	2.26%	646	97.29%	3	0.45%
1936	57	10.38%	491	89.44%	1	0.18%
1940	91	11.18%	723	88.82%	0	0.00%
1944	170	27.11%	457	72.89%	0	0.00%
1948	55	6.75%	359	44.05%	401	49.20%
1952	191	15.03%	1,080	84.97%	0	0.00%
1956	168	14.36%	1,002	85.64%	0	0.00%
1960	263	23.74%	845	76.26%	0	0.00%
1964	1,178	59.98%	786	40.02%	0	0.00%
1968	336	14.51%	812	35.08%	1,167	50.41%
1972	1,363	55.05%	1,113	44.95%	0	0.00%
1976	513	16.94%	2,515	83.06%	0	0.00%
1980	747	25.07%	2,213	74.26%	20	0.67%
1984	1,143	39.44%	1,755	60.56%	0	0.00%
1988	1,261	41.96%	1,730	57.57%	14	0.47%
1992	853	25.15%	2,097	61.82%	442	13.03%
1996	958	30.80%	1,927	61.96%	225	7.23%
2000	1,570	43.43%	1,977	54.69%	68	1.88%
2004	2,112	48.34%	2,220	50.81%	37	0.85%
2008	2,087	46.15%	2,402	53.12%	33	0.73%
2012	1,907	45.35%	2,270	53.98%	28	0.67%
2016	2,035	50.14%	1,971	48.56%	53	1.31%
2020	2,370	53.33%	2,044	45.99%	30	0.68%
2024	2,549	57.20%	1,895	42.53%	12	0.27%

United States Senate election results for Twiggs County, Georgia2
Year	Republican		Democratic		Third party(ies)	
Year	No.	%	No.	%	No.	%
2020	2,313	52.80%	1,981	45.22%	87	1.99%
2020	2,057	52.30%	1,876	47.70%	0	0.00%

United States Senate election results for Twiggs County, Georgia3
Year	Republican		Democratic		Third party(ies)	
Year	No.	%	No.	%	No.	%
2020	1,271	29.25%	1,508	34.71%	1,566	36.04%
2020	2,370	53.69%	2,044	46.31%	0	0.00%
2022	1,886	53.40%	1,601	45.33%	45	1.27%
2022	1,799	53.19%	1,583	46.81%	0	0.00%

Georgia Gubernatorial election results for Twiggs County
Year	Republican		Democratic		Third party(ies)	
Year	No.	%	No.	%	No.	%
2022	1,980	55.93%	1,542	43.56%	18	0.51%

== See also ==
- National Register of Historic Places listings in Twiggs County, Georgia
- List of counties in Georgia
