= Jeffersonville, Georgia =

- City
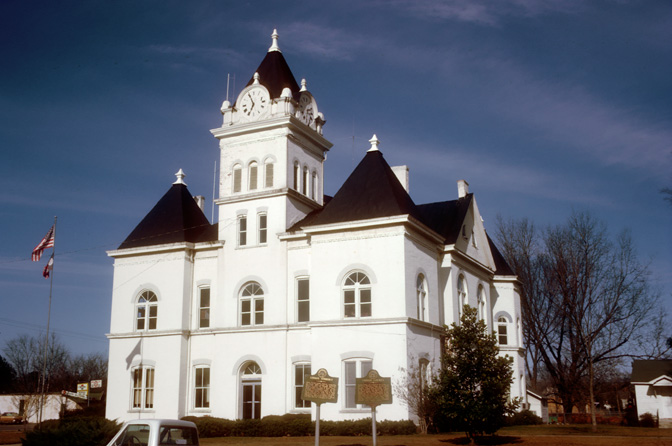
- Twiggs County Courthouse (built 1903), Jeffersonville, Georgia

- Location in Twiggs County and the state of Georgia
- Coordinates: 32°41′2″N 83°20′23″W
- Country: United States
- State: Georgia
- County: Twiggs

Area
  - Total: 3.67 sq mi (9.50 km^{2})
  - Land: 3.66 sq mi (9.47 km^{2})
  - Water: 0.012 sq mi (0.03 km^{2})
- Elevation: 518 ft (158 m)

Population (2020)
  - Total: 977
  - Density: 267/sq mi (103.2/km^{2})
- Time zone: UTC-5 (Eastern (EST))
  - Summer (DST): UTC-4 (EDT)
- ZIP code: 31044
- Area code: 478
- FIPS code: 13-42100
- GNIS feature ID: 0356333
- Website: cityofjeffersonville.org

Jeffersonville is the largest city in and the county seat of Twiggs County, Georgia, United States. As of the 2020 census, Jeffersonville had a population of 977.

Jeffersonville is part of the Macon metropolitan area.

== History ==
The city was named after the Jefferson family of settlers. Jeffersonville was named county seat in 1868, when the seat was transferred from Marion.

== Geography ==
Jeffersonville is located at 32°41′2″N 83°20′23″W (32.683982, -83.339683).

The city is located in the central part of the state, very close to the geographic center of the state. Interstate 16 runs northwest to southeast just south of the city, leading southeast 148 mi (238 km) to Savannah and northwest 25 mi (40 km) to Macon. U.S. Route 80 travels through the city, as well as state routes 18 and 96.

According to the United States Census Bureau, the city has a total area of 3.7 square miles (9.6 km^{2}), all land.

== Demographics ==
Historical population
| Census | Pop. | Note | %± |
|---|---|---|---|
| 1880 | 156 | | — |
| 1910 | 740 | | — |
| 1920 | 842 | | 13.8% |
| 1930 | 692 | | −17.8% |
| 1940 | 804 | | 16.2% |
| 1950 | 787 | | −2.1% |
| 1960 | 1,013 | | 28.7% |
| 1970 | 1,302 | | 28.5% |
| 1980 | 1,473 | | 13.1% |
| 1990 | 1,545 | | 4.9% |
| 2000 | 1,209 | | −21.7% |
| 2010 | 1,035 | | −14.4% |
| 2020 | 977 | | −5.6% |
U.S. Decennial Census; 1850-1870 1870-1880; 1890-1910 1920-1930; 1940 1950 1960; 1970 1980 1990; 2000 2010

Jeffersonville racial composition as of 2020
| Race | Num. | Perc. |
|---|---|---|
| White (non-Hispanic) | 307 | 31.42% |
| Black or African American (non-Hispanic) | 632 | 64.69% |
| Asian | 12 | 1.23% |
| Other/Mixed | 12 | 1.23% |
| Hispanic or Latino | 14 | 1.43% |

As of the 2020 United States census, there were 977 people, 375 households, and 199 families residing in the city.

== Education ==
=== Twiggs County School District ===
The Twiggs County School District holds pre-school to grade twelve, and consists of four elementary schools (two include pre-school programs), a middle school and a high school. The district has 100 full-time teachers and over 1,489 students.

- Jeffersonville Elementary
- Twiggs Middle School
- Twiggs County High School

=== Private education ===
- Twiggs Academy
