= List of places in Georgia (U.S. state) (I–R) =

This is a list of current cities, towns, unincorporated communities, counties, and other recognized places in the U.S. state of Georgia. This list also includes information on the number and names of counties in which the place lies, and its lower and upper ZIP Code bounds, if applicable.

Name of place	Number of counties	Principal county	Lower zip code	Upper zip code
Ida Cason Gardens	1	Harris County		
Ida Vesper	1	Chattahoochee County		
Ideal	1	Macon County	31041	
Idlewood	1	Burke County		
Ila	1	Madison County	30647	
Ilco	1	Brooks County		
Imlac	1	Meriwether County	30293	
Imperial	1	Putnam County	31024	
Inaha	1	Turner County		
Indianola	1	Lowndes County	31601	
Indian Springs	1	Butts County	30216	
Indian Springs	1	Catoosa County	30736	
Industrial	1	Fulton County	30336	
Industrial City of Gordon/Murray/Whitfield Counties	3	Gordon County	30705	
Industrial City of Gordon/Murray/Whitfield Counties	3	Murray County	30705	
Industrial City of Gordon/Murray/Whitfield Counties	3	Whitfield County	30705	
Industry	1	Washington County		
Ingleside	1	Bibb County		
Inman	1	Fayette County	30232	
Inman Park	1	Fulton County		
International	1	Habersham County	30531	
International Office Park	1	Fulton County	30354	
Interstate	1	Liberty County		
Ione	1	Brooks County	31778	
Iron City	1	Seminole County	31759	
Irondale	1	Clayton County		
Iron Stab	1	Polk County		
Irwins	1	Washington County	31089	
Irwins Crossroads	1	Washington County		
Irwinton	1	Wilkinson County	31042	
Irwinville	1	Irwin County	31760	
Isabella	1	Worth County	31791	
Isle of Hope	1	Chatham County	31406	
Isle of Hope-Dutch Island	1	Chatham County		
Ithaca	1	Carroll County		
Ivanhoe	1	Bulloch County	30415	
Ivey	1	Wilkinson County	31031	
Iveys Mill	1	Baker County		
Ivy Log	1	Union County	30512	
Jackson	1	Butts County	30233	
Jacksons Crossroads	1	Wilkes County	30668	
Jacksons Store	1	Wilkes County	30668	
Jacksonville	1	Greene County		
Jacksonville	1	Telfair County	31544	
Jacksonville	1	Towns County	30582	
Jake	1	Carroll County	30182	
Jakin	1	Early County	31761	
Jamaica	1	Glynn County		
James	1	Jones County	31032	
Jamestown	1	Chattahoochee County		
Jamestown	1	Clinch County		
Jamestown	1	Ware County	31501	
Jaroy	1	Cook County		
Jarrell	1	Taylor County	31006	
Jarrett	1	Stephens County		
Jasper	1	Pickens County	30143	
Jay Bird Springs	1	Dodge County	31011	
Jeff	1	Clay County		
Jefferson	1	Camden County		
Jefferson	1	Jackson County	30549	
Jefferson	1	Putnam County	31024	
Jefferson Hills	1	Bibb County		
Jefferson Mill	1	Oglethorpe County	30630	
Jeffersonville	1	Twiggs County	31044	
Jekyll Island	1	Glynn County	31520	
Jenkinsburg	1	Butts County	30234	
Jennie	1	Evans County		
Jersey	1	Walton County	30235	
Jerusalem	1	Camden County	31568	
Jerusalem	1	Pickens County	30143	
Jesup	1	Wayne County	31545	
Jeterville	1	Miller County		
Jewell	1	Warren County	31045	
Jewelville	1	Banks County		
Jewtown	1	Glynn County	31522	
Jimps	1	Bulloch County	30458	
Jinks	1	Decatur County		
Joel	1	Carroll County		
Johnson Corner	1	Toombs County	30436	
Johnson Crossroads	1	Meriwether County	30298	
Johnstonville	1	Lamar County	30204	
Jolly	1	Pike County	30292	
Jones	1	McIntosh County	31323	
Jones Acres	1	Jones County	31201	
Jonesboro	1	Clayton County	30236	
Jones Creek	1	Union County		
Jones Crossroads	1	Early County		
Jones Crossroads	1	Harris County	31822	
Jones Mill	1	Fannin County		
Jones Mill	1	Gilmer County		
Jones Settlement	1	Upson County		
Jonesville	1	Carroll County	30108	
Jordan	1	Wheeler County		
Jordan City	1	Muscogee County		
Jot Em Down Store	1	Pierce County	31516	
Julia	1	Stewart County		
Julienton	1	McIntosh County		
Juliette	1	Monroe County	31046	
Junction City	1	Talbot County	31812	
Juniper	2	Marion County	31801	
Juniper	2	Talbot County	31801	
Juno	1	Dawson County	30534	
Junta	1	Bartow County		
Kansas	1	Carroll County	30182	
Kaolin	1	Washington County		
Kartah	1	Chattooga County		
Kathleen	1	Houston County	31047	
Keith	1	Catoosa County	30755	
Keithsburg	1	Cherokee County	30114	
Keiths Mill	1	Whitfield County		
Keller	1	Bryan County	31324	
Kelley Hill	1	Muscogee County	31905	
Kelleytown	1	Henry County		
Kelly	1	Jasper County	31085	
Kellytown	1	Henry County	30253	
Kemp	1	Emanuel County	30401	
Kennesaw	1	Cobb County	30144	
Kennesaw Mountain National Battlefield Park	1	Cobb County	30061	
Kensington	1	Walker County	30707	
Kensington Park	1	Chatham County		
Kenwood	1	Fayette County	30214	
Kenwood	1	Muscogee County		
Kenzie	1	Upson County	30286	
Kewanee	1	Laurens County		
Keysville	2	Burke County	30816	
Keysville	2	Jefferson County	30816	
Kibbee	1	Montgomery County	30474	
Kiker	1	Gilmer County	30540	
Kilby Mill	1	Rabun County		
Kildare	1	Effingham County	30446	
Killarney	1	Early County	31761	
Kimbrough	1	Webster County	31825	
Kinderlou	1	Lowndes County	31601	
Kings	1	Newton County	30209	
Kings Bay	1	Camden County	31547	
Kingsboro	1	Harris County	31811	
Kingsland	1	Camden County	31547	
Kingston	1	Bartow County	30145	
King's Wood	1	Chatham County	31401	
Kings Wood	1	Richmond County		
Kingwood	1	Colquitt County	31768	
Kinlaw	1	Camden County		
Kinseytown	1	White County	30528	
Kirkland	1	Atkinson County	31642	
Kirkland	1	Jeff Davis County	31539	
Kirkwood	1	DeKalb County		
Kite	1	Johnson County	31049	
Klondike	1	DeKalb County	30058	
Klondike	1	Hall County	30501	
Klondike	1	Houston County	31036	
Knott	1	Troup County	30240	
Knox	1	Bibb County		
Knoxville	1	Crawford County	31050	
Kramer	1	Wilcox County	31001	
Krannert	1	Floyd County		
K'Ville	1	Wayne County		
Kyle	1	Fannin County		
Laboon	1	Walton County	30641	
Laconte	1	Cook County		
La Crosse	1	Schley County	31806	
Ladds	1	Bartow County		
Ladson	1	Colquitt County		
La Fayette	1	Walker County	30728	
Laffingal	1	Cherokee County		
LaGrange	1	Troup County	30240	
Laingkat	1	Decatur County		
Lake	1	Polk County	30125	
Lake Arrowhead	1	Bibb County		
Lake Arrowhead	1	Cherokee County	30183	
Lake Capri	1	Rockdale County	30058	
Lake Cindy	1	Henry County	30228	
Lake City	1	Clayton County	30260	
Lake Creek	1	Polk County	30125	
Lakehills	1	Coweta County		
Lake Howard	1	Walker County	30728	
Lakeland	1	Lanier County	31635	
Lake Lucerne	1	Gwinnett County	30247	
Lakemont	1	Rabun County	30552	
Lakemont	1	Richmond County	30901	
Lake Park	1	Lowndes County	31636	
Lakeshore Estates	1	Hall County	30501	
Lakeside	1	Bibb County		
Lakeside Hills	1	Bibb County		
Lakeside Park	1	Chatham County	31406	
Lake Talmadge	1	Henry County	30228	
Lake Tara	1	Clayton County	30236	
Lakeview	1	Bleckley County	31014	
Lakeview	2	Catoosa County	30741	
Lakeview	2	Walker County	30741	
Lakeview	1	Peach County	31030	
Lakeview Estates	1	Rockdale County	30207	
Lakewood	1	Fulton County	30315	
Lakewood Heights	1	Fulton County		
Lamar	1	Sumter County		
Lamara Heights	1	Chatham County		
Lamarville	1	Chatham County	31405	
Lamkin	1	Columbia County		
Lance Mill	1	Union County		
Landrum	1	Dawson County	30534	
Lands Crossroads	1	Irwin County		
Laney	1	Mitchell County	31784	
Langdon	1	Meriwether County		
Lanier	1	Bryan County	31321	
Lanier Heights	1	Bibb County		
Largain	1	Ware County		
Laroche Park	1	Chatham County		
Lashley	1	Houston County	31005	
Lathemtown	1	Cherokee County	30114	
Laurel Hills	1	Muscogee County		
Laurens Hill	1	Laurens County	31065	
Lavender	1	Floyd County	30161	
La Vista	1	DeKalb County	30329	
Lavonia	1	Franklin County	30553	
Lawrences Mill	1	Pike County		
Lawrenceville	1	Gwinnett County	30245	
Lawson Field	1	Chattahoochee County		
Lawton	1	Jenkins County		
Lax	2	Coffee County	31774	
Lax	2	Irwin County	31774	
Leaf	1	White County	30528	
Leah	1	Columbia County	30802	
Leary	1	Calhoun County	31762	
Leathersville	1	Lincoln County	30817	
Lebanon	1	Cherokee County	30146	
Lecount	1	Liberty County		
Ledbetter	1	Muscogee County		
Leefield	1	Bulloch County	30458	
Lee Pope	1	Crawford County	31030	
Leesburg	1	Lee County	31763	
Lees Crossing	1	Troup County	30240	
Lees Mill	1	Fayette County	30214	
Lehigh	1	Coffee County		
Lela	1	Seminole County		
Leland	1	Cobb County	30059	
Leliaton	1	Atkinson County	31650	
Lena	1	Cobb County	30101	
Lenox	1	Cook County	31637	
Lenox Square	1	Fulton County	30326	
Leo	1	White County		
LePageville	1	Chatham County		
Leslie	1	Sumter County	31764	
Leslie-DeSoto	1	Sumter County		
Lester	1	Mitchell County		
Letford	1	Bryan County		
Leverett	1	Lincoln County		
Leveretts	1	Webster County		
Lewis	1	Screven County	30467	
Lewis B	1	Bibb County	31201	
Lewiston	1	Columbia County	30809	
Lewiston	1	Wilkinson County		
Lewner	1	Union County		
Lexington	1	Oglethorpe County	30648	
Lexsy	1	Emanuel County	30401	
Liberty	1	Greene County		
Liberty City	1	Chatham County	31405	
Libertyhill	1	Lamar County	30257	
Liberty Hill	1	Worth County		
Lifsey	1	Pike County	30295	
Lightfoot	1	Wilkinson County	31090	
Lilburn	1	Gwinnett County	30247	
Lilly	1	Dooly County	31051	
Lily Pond	1	Gordon County	30701	
Limerick	1	Liberty County		
Limestone	1	Bleckley County	31014	
Linco	1	Spalding County		
Lincoln Hills	1	Muscogee County		
Lincoln Park	1	Upson County	30286	
Lincolnton	1	Lincoln County	30817	
Lindale	1	Floyd County	30147	
Linden	1	Muscogee County		
Linder	1	Tift County		
Lindsey Creek	1	Muscogee County	31907	
Lindsley Park	1	Bibb County		
Linesville	1	Wilkes County	30631	
Linton	1	Hancock County	31087	
Linwood	1	Bartow County		
Linwood	1	Walker County	30728	
Listonia	1	Crisp County	31015	
Lithia Springs	1	Douglas County	30057	
Lithonia	1	DeKalb County	30058	
Little Five Points	1	DeKalb County	30307	
Little Hope	1	Seminole County		
Little Miami	1	Lowndes County	31601	
Little River	1	Wilkes County		
Live Oak Gardens	1	Clayton County	30022	
Livingston	1	Floyd County	30161	
Livingston	1	Worth County		
Lizella	1	Bibb County	31052	
Loce	1	Lincoln County		
Lockair	1	Cobb County		
Loco	1	Lincoln County	30817	
Locust Grove	1	Henry County	30248	
Loftin	1	Heard County		
Logan	1	Wilkes County		
Loganville	2	Gwinnett County	30249	
Loganville	2	Walton County	30249	
Logtown	1	Upson County		
Lollie	1	Laurens County	31021	
Lombard	1	Emanuel County		
Lone Oak	1	Meriwether County	30230	
Long Cane	1	Troup County	31809	
Long Pond	1	Wheeler County		
Longstreet	1	Coweta County		
Longstreet Bleckley	1	Bleckley County	31014	
Lookout Mountain	1	Walker County	30750	
Lorane	1	Bibb County	31201	
Lorenzo	1	Effingham County	31329	
Lorwood	1	Chatham County	31406	
Lost Mountain	1	Cobb County	30073	
Lothair	1	Treutlen County	30457	
Lotts	1	Coffee County	31519	
Louise	1	Troup County	30230	
Louisville	1	Jefferson County	30434	
Louvale	1	Stewart County	31814	
Louvale Station	1	Stewart County		
Love Hill	1	Catoosa County	30736	
Lovejoy	1	Clayton County	30250	
Lovelace	1	Lincoln County		
Lovett	1	Laurens County	31021	
Loving	1	Fannin County		
Lowell	1	Carroll County	30117	
Lower Sansavilla	1	Wayne County		
Lowery	1	Laurens County		
Lowry	1	Fayette County	30214	
Lucile	2	Early County	31723	
Lucile	2	Miller County	31723	
Lucius	1	Gilmer County	30522	
Ludowici	1	Long County	31316	
Ludville	1	Pickens County	30175	
Luella	1	Henry County	30248	
Luke	1	Early County		
Lula	2	Banks County	30554	
Lula	2	Hall County	30554	
Lulaton	1	Brantley County	31553	
Lulaville	1	Ben Hill County		
Lumber City	1	Telfair County	31549	
Lumite	1	Habersham County		
Lumpkin	1	Dawson County		
Lumpkin	1	Stewart County	31815	
Lundberg	1	Wilkes County		
Luthersville	1	Meriwether County	30251	
Luvdale	1	Dougherty County	31701	
Luxomni	1	Gwinnett County	30247	
Lyerly	1	Chattooga County	30730	
Lyneville	1	Taliaferro County		
Lynhaven	1	Coweta County		
Lyn Hills	1	Muscogee County		
Lynhurst	1	Chatham County		
Lynmore Estates	1	Bibb County		
Lynn	1	Decatur County	31717	
Lynn	1	Tattnall County		
Lynn Field	1	Decatur County		
Lynnwood	1	Catoosa County	30741	
Lyons	1	Toombs County	30436	
Lytle	1	Walker County	30707	
Mableton	1	Cobb County	30059	
McAfee	1	DeKalb County	30032	
McBean	1	Richmond County	30908	
McBride	1	Coweta County	30263	
McCallie	1	Bartow County		
McCaysville	1	Fannin County	30555	
McCollum	1	Coweta County	30263	
McCrary Settlement	1	Upson County	30258	
McCullough	1	Fannin County		
McCutchen	1	Whitfield County	30740	
McDaniel	1	Pickens County		
McDaniels	1	Gordon County	30701	
McDonald Acres	1	Catoosa County	30741	
McDonough	1	Henry County	30253	
Macedonia	1	Cherokee County	30114	
Macedonia	1	Miller County		
Macedonia	1	Towns County	30546	
McElheneys Crossroads	1	Jasper County		
McElroys Mill	1	Rockdale County	30249	
McGregor	1	Montgomery County	30410	
Machen	1	Jasper County	31064	
McIntosh	1	Liberty County	31320	
McIntosh Mill Village	1	Coweta County	30263	
McIntyre	1	Wilkinson County	31054	
McKee	1	Dawson County		
McKinney	1	Upson County	30286	
McKinnon	1	Wayne County	31545	
Macland	1	Cobb County	30073	
McLendon Crossroads	1	Meriwether County		
McLeods Mill	1	Charlton County		
McManus	1	Glynn County		
McNatt Falls	1	Toombs County		
Macon	2	Bibb County	31201	98
Macon	2	Jones County	31201	98
Macon Mall	1	Bibb County	31206	
Macon Yard	1	Bibb County		
McPherson	1	Paulding County	30132	
McRae	1	Telfair County	31055	
McRae Junction	1	Telfair County		
McTier	1	Appling County		
McWhorter	1	Douglas County	30134	
Maddox	1	Sumter County		
Madison	1	Morgan County	30650	
Madola	1	Fannin County	30541	
Madras	1	Coweta County	30254	
Madray Springs	1	Wayne County	31545	
Magby Gap	1	Dade County	30752	
Magnet	1	Rockdale County	30207	
Magnolia	1	Clinch County		
Magnolia Park	1	Chatham County		
Magruder	1	Burke County		
Mahailey Crossroads	1	Heard County		
Mahers Quarry	1	Henry County		
Major	1	Coweta County		
Mallorysville	1	Wilkes County	30668	
Malvern	1	Emanuel County	30442	
Manassas	1	Tattnall County	30438	
Manchester	2	Meriwether County	31816	
Manchester	2	Talbot County	31816	
Mandeville	1	Carroll County		
Manningtown	1	Wayne County		
Manor	1	Ware County	31550	
Mansfield	1	Newton County	30255	
Manta	1	Chattahoochee County	31805	
Maple Grove	1	Fannin County		
Marblehill	1	Pickens County	30148	
Maretts	1	Hart County	30553	
Margret	1	Fannin County		
Marietta	1	Cobb County	30007	90
Marietta Campground	1	Cobb County	30060	
Marine Corps Logistics Base, LANT	1	Dougherty County	31704	
Marion	1	Gilmer County		
Marion	1	Twiggs County	31020	
Marion Homes	1	Richmond County		
Marlow	1	Effingham County	31312	
Marshall	1	Crisp County		
Marshallville	1	Macon County	31057	
Mars Hill	1	Cobb County	30101	
Martech	1	Fulton County	30377	
Martin	2	Franklin County	30557	
Martin	2	Stephens County	30557	
Martindale	1	Walker County		
Martinez	2	Columbia County	30907	
Martinez	2	Richmond County	30907	
Martin Luther King, Jr. National Historic Site	1	Fulton County	30303	
Martins Crossroads	1	Lincoln County		
Martins Crossroads	1	Randolph County		
Mashburn Mill	1	Fannin County		
Mason	1	Heard County		
Massee	1	Cook County	31620	
Massey Hill	1	Wilkinson County		
Masseyville	1	Walker County		
Match	1	Elbert County	30624	
Matt	1	Forsyth County	30130	
Matthews	1	Jefferson County	30818	
Mattox	1	Charlton County	31539	
Mattox Ford	1	Clinch County		
Mauk	1	Taylor County	31058	
Maxeys	1	Oglethorpe County	30671	
Maxim	1	Lincoln County	30817	
Maxwell	1	Fannin County		
Maxwell	1	Jasper County	31085	
Mayday	1	Echols County	31636	
Mayfair	1	Chatham County	31401	
Mayfield	1	Hancock County	31087	
Mayhaw	1	Miller County	31723	
Mays Bluff	1	Camden County		
Mayson	1	Fulton County		
Maysville	2	Banks County	30558	
Maysville	2	Jackson County	30558	
Mead	1	Bibb County		
Meadow	1	Gwinnett County		
Meadowbrook	1	Bibb County		
Meadowdale	1	Houston County		
Meansville	1	Pike County	30256	
Mecca	1	Fulton County		
Mechanic Hill	1	Richmond County		
Mechanicsville	1	Gwinnett County	30040	
Meda	1	Putnam County		
Meeks	1	Johnson County	31049	
Meigs	2	Mitchell County	31765	
Meigs	2	Thomas County	31765	
Meinhard	1	Chatham County	31401	
Meldrim	1	Effingham County	31318	
Melody Lakes	1	Harris County		
Melrose	1	Lowndes County	31636	
Melson	1	Floyd County	30124	
Melton	1	Richmond County		
Mendes	1	Tattnall County	30427	
Menlo	1	Chattooga County	30731	
Mercer University	1	Bibb County	31207	
Merchants Walk	1	Cobb County	30067	
Meridian	1	McIntosh County	31319	
Meriwether	1	Baldwin County		
Meriwether White Sulphur Springs	1	Meriwether County	31822	
Merrillville	1	Thomas County	31738	
Mershon	1	Pierce County	31551	
Mesena	1	Warren County	30819	
Metasville	1	Wilkes County	30673	
Metcalf	1	Thomas County	31792	
Methvins	1	Sumter County		
Metter	1	Candler County	30439	
Meyer	1	Muscogee County		
Miami Valley	1	Peach County		
Mica	1	Cherokee County	30107	
Middleton	1	Elbert County	30635	
Midland	1	Muscogee County	31820	
Midriver	1	Camden County		
Midtown	1	Fulton County	30309	
Midville	1	Burke County	30441	
Midway	1	Baldwin County		
Midway	1	Catoosa County	30741	
Midway	1	Clinch County		
Midway	1	Habersham County	30531	
Midway	1	Laurens County		
Midway	1	Liberty County	31320	
Midway	1	Lincoln County		
Midway	1	Tattnall County	30525	
Milan	2	Dodge County	31060	
Milan	2	Telfair County	31060	
Milford	1	Baker County	31762	
Mill Creek	1	Whitfield County	30740	
Milledgeville	1	Baldwin County	31061	
Millen	1	Jenkins County	30442	
Millers Mill	1	Henry County		
Millhaven	1	Screven County	30467	
Millwood	1	Ware County	31552	
Milner	1	Lamar County	30257	
Milner Crossroads	1	Lamar County	30204	
Milstead	1	Rockdale County	30207	
Mimsville	1	Baker County		
Mina	1	Fulton County		
Mineola	1	Lowndes County	31601	
Mineral Bluff	1	Fannin County	30559	
Minnesota	1	Colquitt County	31744	
Minneta	1	Jasper County		
Minter	1	Laurens County		
Minton	1	Worth County		
Miralia	1	Fulton County		
Missionary Ridge	1	Walker County		
Mission Ridge	1	Walker County	30741	
Mitchell	1	Glascock County	30820	
Mitchell Forks	1	Bulloch County		
Mize	1	Stephens County	30577	
Mizell	1	Taylor County	31006	
Mobley Crossing	1	Pulaski County		
Modoc	1	Emanuel County	30401	
Mogul	1	Bibb County		
Molena	1	Pike County	30258	
Moncrief	1	Grady County	31728	
Moniac	1	Charlton County	31646	
Monroe	1	Walton County	30655	
Montclair	1	Richmond County	30907	
Monteith	1	Chatham County	31401	
Montevideo	2	Elbert County	30635	
Montevideo	2	Hart County	30635	
Montezuma	1	Macon County	31063	
Montgomery	1	Chatham County	31406	
Montgomery Correctional Institute	1	Montgomery County	30445	
Monticello	1	Jasper County	31064	
Montivedio	2	Elbert County		
Montivedio	2	Hart County		
Montreal	1	DeKalb County	30033	
Montrose	1	Laurens County	31065	
Moody	1	Lowndes County		
Moody Air Force Base	1	Lowndes County	31601	
Moons	1	Walker County	30725	
Moores	1	Laurens County	31021	
Moores Crossroads	1	Clay County		
Mora	2	Atkinson County	31650	
Mora	2	Coffee County	31650	
Moran	1	Crawford County		
Moreland	1	Coweta County	30259	
Morgan	1	Calhoun County	31766	
Morgan	1	Haralson County		
Morganton	1	Fannin County	30560	
Morganville	1	Dade County	30757	
Morningside	1	Fulton County		
Morningside	1	Muscogee County		
Morningside Heights	1	Hall County	30501	
Morning Side Hills	1	Hall County		
Morris	1	Quitman County	31767	
Morris Brown	1	Fulton County	30314	
Morris Estates	1	Catoosa County	30736	
Morris Siding	1	Fulton County		
Morrow	1	Clayton County	30260	
Morton	1	Jones County		
Morven	1	Brooks County	31638	
Moss Oak	1	Houston County		
Mossy Creek	1	White County		
Mossy Dell	1	Lee County		
Moultrie	1	Colquitt County	31776	
Moultrie Municipal Airport	1	Colquitt County	31768	
Mountainbrook	1	Harris County	31822	
Mountain City	1	Rabun County	30562	
Mountain Hill	1	Harris County	31811	
Mountain Park	2	Cherokee County	30075	
Mountain Park	2	Fulton County	30075	
Mountain Park	1	DeKalb County	30087	
Mountain Park	1	Gwinnett County	30247	
Mountain Scene	1	Towns County	30546	
Mountain Springs	1	Jones County		
Mountain View	1	Clayton County	30070	
Mountain View	1	Walker County	30741	
Mount Airy	1	Habersham County	30563	
Mount Berry	1	Floyd County	30149	
Mount Bethel	1	Cobb County	30060	
Mount Carmel	1	Walker County	30728	
Mount Herman	1	Chatham County		
Mount Olivet	1	Hart County	30643	
Mount Park	1	Gwinnett County	30247	
Mount Pleasant	1	Banks County	30547	
Mount Pleasant	1	Chatham County		
Mount Pleasant	1	Decatur County		
Mount Pleasant	1	Wayne County	31543	
Mount Vernon	1	Montgomery County	30445	
Mount Vernon	1	Walton County	30655	
Mount Vernon	1	Whitfield County	30740	
Mountville	1	Troup County	30261	
Mount Wilkinson	1	Cobb County		
Mount Zion	1	Carroll County	30150	
Moxley	1	Jefferson County	30477	
Moye	1	Calhoun County	31746	
Mulberry	1	Barrow County	30680	
Mulberry		Gwinnett County		
Mulberry Grove	1	Chatham County		
Mulberry Grove	1	Harris County	31804	
Mulberry Street	1	Bibb County	31201	
Mundys Mill	1	Clayton County		
Munnerlyn	1	Burke County	30830	
Murphy	1	Colquitt County	31738	
Murphy Junction	1	Fannin County		
Murray Hill	1	Burke County		
Murray Hills	1	Richmond County		
Murrays Crossroads	1	Schley County	31806	
Murray's Lake	1	Clayton County	30050	
Murrayville	1	Hall County	30564	
Muscogee	1	Muscogee County		
Muscogee Junction	1	Muscogee County		
Musella	1	Crawford County	31066	
Musselwhite	1	Crisp County		
Myricks Mill	1	Twiggs County		
Myrtle	1	Peach County		
Myrtle Grove	1	Bryan County	31324	
Mystic	1	Irwin County	31769	
Nacoochee	1	White County		
Nahunta	1	Brantley County	31553	
Nails Creek	1	Banks County	30521	
Nakomis	1	Crawford County		
Nance Springs	1	Whitfield County		
Nankin	1	Brooks County		
Nankipooh	1	Muscogee County	31808	
Naomi	1	Walker County	30728	
Nashville	1	Berrien County	31639	
National Colony Apartments	1	Clayton County	30236	
National Hills	1	Richmond County	30904	
Naval Air Station	1	Cobb County		
Navy Supply Corps School	1	Clarke County	30606	
Naylor	1	Lowndes County	31641	
Neal	1	Houston County		
Neal	1	Pike County	30206	
Nebo	1	Paulding County	30132	
Nebula	1	Meriwether County		
Neco	1	Richmond County	30906	
Needham	1	Ware County		
Needmore	1	Brantley County		
Needmore	1	Echols County	31630	
Neese	1	Madison County	30646	
Nelson	2	Cherokee County	30151	
Nelson	2	Pickens County	30151	
Nesbit	1	Wayne County		
Nevils	1	Bulloch County	31321	
Newark	1	Thomas County	31792	
Newborn	1	Newton County	30262	
New Branch	1	Toombs County	30436	
New Cotton Mill	1	Cherokee County	30114	
Newell	1	Charlton County		
New Elm	1	Colquitt County	31768	
New England	1	Dade County	30752	
New Era	1	Sumter County	31709	
New Ford	1	Echols County		
New Georgia	1	Paulding County	30132	
New Holland	1	Hall County	30501	
New Home	1	Dade County	30752	
New Hope	1	Bulloch County		
New Hope	1	Gilmer County		
New Hope	1	Glynn County		
New Hope	1	Gwinnett County	30245	
New Hope	1	Lincoln County	30817	
New Hope	1	Paulding County	30132	
Newington	1	Screven County	30446	
New Lacy	1	Bacon County		
New Lois	1	Berrien County		
Newnan	1	Coweta County	30263	65
New Point	1	Sumter County	31780	
Newpoint	1	Sumter County		
Newport	1	Fannin County		
New Rock Hill	1	Brooks County		
New Salem	1	Banks County	30547	
New Sirmans	1	Clinch County	31635	
Newsome	1	Lee County		
New Switzerland	1	Habersham County		
Newton	1	Baker County	31770	
Newton Factory	1	Newton County	30209	
Newtown	1	Fulton County	30201	
New Town	1	Gordon County		
New Town	1	Wilkes County	30673	
New York	1	Polk County	30104	
Neyami	1	Lee County	31763	
Nicholasville	1	Early County	31713	
Nicholasville	1	Walton County		
Nicholls	1	Coffee County	31554	
Nicholson	1	Jackson County	30565	
Nicholsonville	1	Chatham County		
Nickajack	1	Cobb County		
Nickelsville	1	Gordon County	30735	
Nicklesville	1	Wilkinson County	31042	
Nickleville	1	Grady County	31797	
Nickville	1	Elbert County	30634	
Nimblewill	1	Lumpkin County		
Nixon	1	Richmond County		
Noah	1	Jefferson County	30818	
Noble	1	Walker County	30728	
Noonday	1	Cobb County	30060	
Norcross	1	Gwinnett County	30071	93
Norman	1	Elbert County		
Norman	1	Wilkes County	30668	
Norman Park	1	Colquitt County	31771	
Normantown	1	Toombs County	30474	
Norris	1	Warren County	30828	
Norristown	1	Emanuel County	30447	
North Albany	1	Lee County		
North Atlanta	1	DeKalb County	30319	
North Brunswick	1	Glynn County		
North Canton	1	Cherokee County	30114	
North Clayton	1	Clayton County		
North Columbus	1	Muscogee County		
Northcutt	1	Gilmer County		
North Decatur	1	DeKalb County	30033	
North Druid Hills	1	DeKalb County	30033	
North Dublin	1	Laurens County	31021	
North Elberton	1	Elbert County	30635	
North Highland	1	Fulton County	30306	
North Highlands	1	Muscogee County		
North High Shoals	1	Oconee County	30645	
North Kirkwood	1	DeKalb County		
Northlake	1	DeKalb County	30345	
North Metro MPC	1	Gwinnett County	30158	
North Milledgeville	1	Baldwin County		
North Roswell	1	Fulton County	30075	
North Savannah	1	Chatham County		
North Side	1	Fulton County	30305	
North Springs	1	Fulton County	30338	
North West Point	1	Troup County	31833	
Northwoods	1	DeKalb County	30340	
Norton	1	Whitfield County		
Norwich	1	Taylor County		
Norwood	1	Warren County	30821	
Notalee Orchards	1	Union County		
Note	1	Putnam County	31024	
Nuberg	1	Hart County	30634	
Nunez	1	Emanuel County	30448	
Nyson	1	Fayette County		
Oakdale	1	Chatham County		
Oakdale	1	Cobb County	30080	
Oakfield	1	Worth County	31772	
Oak Grove	1	Carroll County		
Oak Grove	1	Cherokee County	30101	
Oak Grove	1	Cobb County	30101	
Oak Grove	1	DeKalb County	30033	
Oak Grove	1	Montgomery County		
Oak Grove	1	Troup County	31822	
Oak Grove	1	Wilkes County		
Oak Hill	1	Calhoun County		
Oak Hill	1	Gilmer County	30540	
Oak Hill	1	Newton County	30209	
Oakhurst	1	Chatham County	31406	
Oakhurst	1	DeKalb County		
Oak Knolls	1	Houston County		
Oakland	1	Gilmer County		
Oakland	1	Lee County	31763	
Oakland	1	Meriwether County	30218	
Oakland City	1	Fulton County		
Oakland Heights	1	Bartow County	30120	
Oakland Park	1	Muscogee County	31900	
Oaklawn	1	Brooks County	31626	
Oaklawn	1	Coweta County		
Oak Level	1	Bryan County		
Oakman	1	Gordon County	30732	
Oak Mountain	1	Carroll County		
Oak Mountain	1	Harris County	31826	
Oak Park	1	Emanuel County	30401	
Oakton	1	Walker County		
Oakville	1	Terrell County		
Oakwood	1	Hall County	30566	
Oaky	1	Effingham County		
Oasis	1	Fannin County	30513	
Oberry	1	Atkinson County		
Ocee	1	Fulton County	30201	
Ochillee	1	Chattahoochee County	31905	
Ochlocknee	1	Thomas County	31773	
Ochwalkee	1	Wheeler County	30428	
Ocilla	1	Irwin County	31774	
Ocmulgee National Monument	1	Bibb County	31201	
Oconee	1	Washington County	31067	
Oconee Heights	1	Clarke County	30601	
Odessa	1	Wayne County		
Odessadale	1	Meriwether County	30222	
Odis Crossroads	1	Banks County		
Odum	1	Wayne County	31555	
Offerman	1	Pierce County	31556	
Ogeechee	1	Screven County	30467	
Ogeechee Road	1	Chatham County	31405	
Ogeecheeton	1	Chatham County	31401	
Oglesby	1	Elbert County		
Oglethorpe	1	Chatham County	31416	
Oglethorpe	1	Macon County	31068	
Oglethorpe Park	1	Chatham County	31405	
Oglethorpe University	1	DeKalb County	30319	
Ogletree Woods	1	Muscogee County		
Ohoopee	1	Toombs County	30436	
Okefenokee	1	Ware County	31501	
Ola	1	Henry County	30253	
Old Airport Community	1	Floyd County	30161	
Old Damascus	1	Early County	31741	
Old Dellwood	1	Emanuel County		
Old National	1	Fulton County	30349	
Old Town	1	Jefferson County		
O'Leary	1	Chatham County		
Olifftown	1	Candler County		
Olive Branch	1	Talbot County	31827	
Oliver	1	Screven County	30449	
Olivers Mill	1	Terrell County		
Ollie	1	Gilmer County		
Olney	1	Bulloch County	31308	
Omaha	1	Stewart County	31821	
Omaha Springs	1	Jefferson County		
Omega	2	Colquitt County	31775	
Omega	2	Tift County	31775	
O Neal	1	Wayne County		
O'Neals Crossroad	1	Heard County		
Oostanaula	1	Gordon County	30701	
Ophir	1	Cherokee County	30107	
Orange	1	Cherokee County	30114	
Orchard Hill	1	Spalding County	30266	
Orchard Hills	1	Walker County	30741	
Ordway	1	Muscogee County	31820	
Oreburg	1	Floyd County		
Oremont	1	Polk County		
Orianna	1	Laurens County	31002	
Orland	1	Treutlen County	30457	
Ormewood	1	Fulton County		
Orrs	1	Clayton County		
Orsman	1	Floyd County		
Osborn	1	Towns County		
Oscarville	1	Forsyth County	30501	
Osierfield	1	Irwin County	31750	
Ossahatchie	1	Harris County		
Otter Creek	1	Pierce County		
Ottley	1	Fulton County		
Ousley	1	Lowndes County	31601	
Overbrook	1	Bulloch County		
Owen	1	Pierce County		
Owens	1	Early County		
Owensboro	1	Wilcox County	31079	
Owensbyville	1	Heard County		
Owltown	1	Union County	30512	
Oxford	1	Newton County	30267	
Pabst	1	Houston County		
Pace	1	Newton County	30209	
Pachitla	1	Randolph County	31740	
Padena	1	Fannin County		
Paintertown	1	Fannin County		
Palato	1	Jasper County		
Palmetto	2	Coweta County	30268	
Palmetto	2	Fulton County	30268	
Palmetto	1	Oglethorpe County	30627	
Palmyra	1	Lee County	31763	
Pancras	1	Baldwin County		
Paneras	1	Baldwin County	31061	
Panhandle	1	Taylor County	31076	
Pannell	1	Walton County	30655	
Panola	1	DeKalb County		
Pantertown	1	Fannin County	30559	
Panthersville	1	DeKalb County	30032	
Paoli	1	Madison County	30629	
Paradise	1	Barrow County		
Paradise Park	1	Chatham County	31406	
Paradise Valley	1	Clarke County		
Paramore Hill	1	Jenkins County		
Pardue Mill	1	Habersham County		
Parhams	1	Franklin County	30521	
Parish	1	Candler County		
Parkchester	1	Muscogee County		
Park City	1	Walker County	30741	
Parker Courthouse	1	Decatur County		
Parkers	1	Screven County		
Parkersburg	1	Chatham County	31406	
Parkertown	1	Hart County		
Parkertown Mill	1	Hart County		
Parkerville	1	Worth County	31744	
Park Hill	1	Hall County	30501	
Parks Mill	1	Morgan County		
Parksville	1	Calhoun County		
Parkwood	1	Chatham County		
Parrott	1	Terrell County	31777	
Pasco	1	Thomas County		
Pateville	1	Crisp County		
Patillo	1	Lamar County	30233	
Patmos	1	Baker County		
Patten	1	Thomas County	31626	
Patterson	1	Madison County		
Patterson	1	Pierce County	31557	
Patton	1	Walker County		
Paulk	1	Bleckley County		
Pavo	2	Brooks County	31778	
Pavo	2	Thomas County	31778	
Paxton	1	Charlton County		
Payne	1	Bibb County	31201	
Payne	1	Cherokee County	30101	
Paynes Mill	1	Upson County	30286	
Peach Orchard	1	Richmond County	30906	
Peachtree Center	1	Fulton County	30343	
Peachtree City	1	Fayette County	30269	
Peachtree Corners	1	Gwinnett County	30092	
Pearl	1	Elbert County		
Pearly	1	Laurens County	31021	
Pearson	1	Atkinson County	31642	
Pebblebrook Estates	1	Cobb County	30059	
Pebble City	1	Mitchell County	31784	
Pebble Hill	1	Brooks County		
Pecan	1	Clay County		
Pecan City	1	Dougherty County		
Pedenville	1	Pike County	30206	
Pelham	1	Mitchell County	31779	
Pembroke	1	Bryan County	31321	
Pendarvis	1	Wayne County		
Pendergrass	1	Jackson County	30567	
Pendley Hills	1	DeKalb County	30032	
Penfield	1	Greene County	30669	
Penia	1	Crisp County	31015	
Pennick	1	Glynn County	31520	
Pennington	1	Morgan County	30650	
Pennington	1	Sumter County		
Pennville	1	Chattooga County	30747	
Peoples Still	1	Grady County	31797	
Pepperton	1	Butts County	30233	
Percale	1	Monroe County		
Perennial	1	Chattooga County		
Perimeter Center	1	DeKalb County	30346	
Perkins	1	Jenkins County	30822	
Perry	2	Houston County	31069	
Perry	2	Peach County	31069	
Perry Homes	1	Fulton County	30318	
Persico	1	Meriwether County		
Persimmon	1	Rabun County	30525	
Petersburg	1	Gordon County		
Peterson Hill	1	Randolph County		
Petross	1	Montgomery County	30474	
Phelps	1	Whitfield County	30720	
Philema	1	Lee County		
Phillipsburg	1	Tift County	31794	
Phillips Subdivision	1	Richmond County	30907	
Philomath	1	Oglethorpe County	30660	
Phinizy	1	Columbia County	30802	
Phoenix	1	Putnam County	31024	
Pickard	1	Upson County	30286	
Pidcock	1	Brooks County		
Piddleville	1	Bulloch County		
Piedmont	1	Lamar County	30204	
Piedmont Heights	1	Troup County		
Pierceville	1	Fannin County	30555	
Pikes Peak	1	Twiggs County		
Pineboro	1	Colquitt County	31768	
Pine Chapel	1	Gordon County	30701	
Pinefield Crossroads	1	Banks County		
Pine Gardens	1	Chatham County		
Pine Grove	1	Appling County	31513	
Pine Harbor	1	McIntosh County	31331	
Pine Hill	1	Jefferson County		
Pine Hill	1	Muscogee County		
Pinehurst	1	Dooly County	31070	
Pinehurst	1	Henry County	30281	
Pine Lake	1	DeKalb County	30072	
Pineland	1	Echols County	31630	
Pine Log	1	Bartow County	30171	
Pine Mountain	1	Harris County	31822	
Pine Mountain	1	Rabun County	30525	
Pine Mountain Valley	1	Harris County	31823	
Pineora	1	Effingham County	31312	
Pine Park	1	Grady County	31728	
Pine Ridge	1	Jones County		
Pinesville	1	Jones County		
Pinetta	1	Irwin County		
Pine Valley	1	Cook County		
Pine Valley	1	Richmond County	30901	
Pine Valley	1	Ware County		
Pineview	1	Wilcox County	31071	
Piney Bluff	1	Camden County	31565	
Piney Grove	1	Harris County	31808	
Pink	1	White County		
Pin Point	1	Chatham County	31406	
Pinson	1	Floyd County	30161	
Pio Nono	1	Bibb County	31204	
Pirkle Woods	1	Forsyth County	30130	
Piscola	1	Thomas County		
Pisgah	1	Gilmer County		
Pittman	1	Gwinnett County		
Pitts	1	Wilcox County	31072	
Pittsburg	1	DeKalb County	30084	
Plainfield	1	Dodge County	31073	
Plains	1	Sumter County	31780	
Plainview	1	Franklin County	30521	
Plainview	1	Morgan County		
Plainview	1	Warren County		
Plainview	1	Whitfield County		
Plainville	1	Gordon County	30733	
Planter	1	Madison County		
Plaza	1	Clayton County	30050	
Pleasant Grove	1	Union County		
Pleasant Grove	1	Whitfield County		
Pleasant Hill	1	Fannin County		
Pleasant Hill	1	Fulton County	30337	
Pleasant Hill	1	Gilmer County		
Pleasant Hill	1	Gwinnett County	30136	
Pleasant Hill	1	Talbot County	31836	
Pleasant Hill	1	Terrell County	31742	
Pleasant Valley	1	Bartow County	30103	
Pleasant Valley	1	Dooly County	31092	
Po Biddy Crossroads	1	Talbot County		
Pocatalago	1	Madison County		
Pocataligo	1	Madison County	30633	
Point Peter	1	Oglethorpe County	30627	
Poletree	1	Clinch County		
Pollards Corner	1	Columbia County	30802	
Pomona	1	Spalding County	30223	
Ponderosa	1	Toombs County		
Pond Spring	1	Walker County	30707	
Pooler	1	Chatham County	31322	
Pope City	1	Wilcox County	31079	
Popes Ferry	1	Monroe County	31046	
Poplar Crossroads	1	Talbot County		
Poplar Grove	1	Franklin County		
Poplar Hill	1	Dodge County		
Poplar Springs	1	Haralson County	30113	
Popwellville	1	Brantley County		
Portal	1	Bulloch County	30450	
Porter	1	Bleckley County		
Porterdale	1	Newton County	30270	
Porter Springs	1	Lumpkin County	30533	
Portland	1	Polk County	30104	
Port Royal	1	Bryan County		
Port Wentworth	1	Chatham County	31407	
Port Wentworth Junction	1	Chatham County		
Postell	1	Jones County	31201	
Potter	1	Echols County		
Potterville	1	Taylor County	31076	
Poulan	1	Worth County	31781	
Powder Springs	1	Cobb County	30073	
Powell Place	1	Dougherty County	31701	
Powelltown	1	Worth County		
Powelton	1	Hancock County	31059	
Powersville	1	Peach County	31008	
Prater Mill	1	Whitfield County		
Pratersville	1	Whitfield County		
Prather	1	Wilkes County	30673	
Prattsburg	1	Talbot County	31039	
Prentiss	1	Appling County		
Presley	1	Towns County	30546	
Preston	1	Webster County	31824	
Pretoria	1	Bulloch County		
Pretoria	1	Dougherty County	31701	
Price	1	Hall County	30501	
Pridgen	1	Coffee County	31519	
Primrose	1	Meriwether County	30222	
Princeton	1	Clarke County	30601	
Pringle	1	Washington County	31035	
Prior	1	Polk County	30138	
Pritchetts	1	Worth County	31744	
Privette Heights	1	Cobb County	30060	
Prosperity	1	Brantley County		
Pulaski	1	Candler County	30451	
Pumpkin Center	1	Columbia County	30814	
Putnam	1	Marion County	31803	
Putney	1	Dougherty County	31782	
Pyles Marsh	1	Glynn County	31520	
Pyne	1	Troup County	30240	
Quality	1	Thomas County		
Queensland	1	Ben Hill County	31750	
Quill	1	Gilmer County		
Quitman	1	Brooks County	31643	
Rabbit Hill	1	Bryan County	31324	
Rabun Gap	1	Rabun County	30568	
Raccoon Bluff	1	McIntosh County		
Race Pond	1	Charlton County	31539	
Racepond	1	Charlton County		
Radio Springs	1	Floyd County		
Radium Springs	1	Dougherty County	31705	
Ragsdale	1	Dougherty County		
Rahns	1	Effingham County		
Raines	1	Crisp County	31015	
Rains Landing	1	Camden County		
Raleigh	1	Meriwether County	30293	
Ramhurst	1	Murray County	30705	
Ramsey	1	Dougherty County		
Randall	1	Stewart County	31815	
Ranger	1	Gordon County	30734	
Raoul	1	Habersham County	30510	
Raulerson	1	Brantley County	31557	
Ravenwood	1	Richmond County	30907	
Rawls	1	Troup County		
Raybon	1	Brantley County	31553	
Ray City	1	Berrien County	31645	
Rayle	1	Wilkes County	30660	
Raymond	1	Coweta County	30263	
Raysville	1	McDuffie County		
Raytown	1	Taliaferro County	30631	
Rebecca	1	Turner County	31783	
Reber	1	Chatham County		
Rebie	1	Bleckley County	31012	
Recovery	1	Decatur County	32324	
Redan	1	DeKalb County	30074	
Red Bluff	1	Ben Hill County		
Red Bluff	1	Camden County	31568	
Redbone	1	Lamar County		
Redbone Crossroads	1	Upson County		
Redbud	1	Gordon County	30701	
Redclay	1	Whitfield County	30710	
Red Clay	1	Whitfield County		
Red Hill	1	Franklin County	30557	
Red Hill	1	Stewart County	31825	
Redland	1	Wayne County	31545	
Red Lane	1	Hall County	30501	
Red Oak	1	Fulton County	30272	
Red Rock	1	Cobb County	30101	
Red Rock	1	Worth County	31791	
Red Stone	1	Jackson County	30549	
Red Store Crossroads	1	Baker County		
Redwine	1	Fulton County		
Reed Creek	1	Hart County	30643	
Reesburg	1	Floyd County		
Reese	1	Morgan County		
Reese	1	Warren County	30828	
Reeves	1	Gordon County	30701	
Register	1	Bulloch County	30452	
Rehobeth	1	Harris County	31804	
Rehoboth	1	DeKalb County	30033	
Reids	1	Twiggs County		
Reidsboro	1	Pike County	30292	
Reids Crossroads	1	Putnam County		
Reidsville	1	Tattnall County	30453	
Reka	1	Bryan County	31321	
Relay	1	Floyd County	30125	
Relee	1	Coffee County		
Remerton	1	Lowndes County	31601	
Renfroe	1	Chattahoochee County	31805	
Reno	1	Grady County	31728	
Rentz	1	Laurens County	31075	
Reo	1	Walker County	30740	
Resaca	1	Gordon County	30735	
Resseaus Crossroads	1	Putnam County	31024	
Rest Haven	2	Gwinnett County	30518	
Rest Haven	2	Hall County	30518	
Retreat	1	Liberty County	31323	
Rex	1	Clayton County	30273	
Reynolds	1	Taylor County	31076	
Reynoldsville	1	Seminole County	31745	
Rhine	1	Dodge County	31077	
Riceboro	1	Liberty County	31323	
Richfield	1	Chatham County	31405	
Richland	1	Stewart County	31825	
Richmond Hill	1	Bryan County	31324	
Richwood	1	Dooly County	31092	
Ricks Place	1	Clay County	31751	
Rico	1	Fulton County	30268	
Riddleville	1	Washington County	31018	
Ridgefield Heights	1	Muscogee County		
Ridgeville	1	McIntosh County	31331	
Ridgeway	1	Harris County		
Ridgewood	1	Chatham County		
Ridley	1	Heard County	30217	
Rincon	1	Effingham County	31326	
Ringgold	1	Catoosa County	30736	
Rio	1	Spalding County	30223	
Rio Vista	1	Chatham County	31404	
Rio Vista	1	Dougherty County		
Ripley	1	Twiggs County		
Rising Fawn	1	Dade County	30738	
Ritch	1	Wayne County		
River Bend	1	Dougherty County		
Riverbend	1	Irwin County		
Riverdale	1	Clayton County	30274	96
Riverland Terrace	1	Muscogee County		
Rivers End	1	Chatham County	31406	
Riverside	1	Bibb County	31204	
Riverside	1	Chatham County	31404	
Riverside	1	Colquitt County	31768	
Riverside	1	Floyd County	30161	
Riverside	1	Fulton County		
Rivertown	1	Fulton County	30213	
Riverturn	1	Seminole County	31745	
Riverview	1	Bibb County		
Rivoli	1	Bibb County		
Roadside	1	Upson County		
Roanoke	1	Ben Hill County	31750	
Roberta	1	Crawford County	31078	
Roberts Crossroad	1	Hall County	30518	
Robertson	1	Baldwin County		
Robertstown	1	White County	30545	
Robertsville	1	Walker County		
Robins Air Force Base	1	Houston County	31098	
Robinson	1	Floyd County		
Robinson	1	Taliaferro County	30669	
Rochelle	1	Wilcox County	31079	
Rockalo	1	Heard County	30217	
Rock Branch	1	Elbert County	30635	
Rock Cut	1	Clayton County	30260	
Rockdale	1	Fulton County		
Rock Fence Crossroads	1	Burke County		
Rock Hill	1	Early County	31723	
Rockingham	1	Bacon County	31510	
Rockledge	1	Laurens County	30454	
Rockmart	1	Polk County	30153	
Rockridge	1	Heard County		
Rock Spring	1	Walker County	30739	
Rock Springs	1	Toombs County		
Rock Springs	1	Walker County		
Rockville	1	Putnam County	31024	
Rocky Creek	1	Gordon County	30701	
Rocky Face	1	Whitfield County	30740	
Rocky Ford	1	Screven County	30455	
Rocky Hill	1	Grady County		
Rocky Mount	1	Meriwether County	30251	
Rocky Plains	1	Newton County	30209	
Roddenberry	1	Grady County		
Roddy	1	Dodge County	31014	
Rodgers	1	Bartow County		
Rogers	1	Jenkins County		
Rogers	1	Madison County	30529	
Rogers Mill	1	White County		
Roland	1	Upson County		
Rollo Sand Pit	1	Crawford County		
Rolston	1	Gilmer County		
Rome	1	Floyd County	30161	65
Roopville	1	Carroll County	30170	
Roosevelt	1	Gilmer County		
Roosterville	1	Heard County	30170	
Roper	1	Jeff Davis County	31539	
Ropers Crossroads	1	Columbia County		
Roscoe	1	Coweta County	30263	
Rosebud	1	Gwinnett County	30249	
Rosedale	1	Floyd County	30701	
Rose Dhu	1	Chatham County	31406	
Rose Hill	1	Chatham County	31406	
Rose Hill	1	Muscogee County	31904	
Rose Hill	1	Oconee County		
Rose Hill	1	Pike County	30256	
Rose Hill Heights	1	Muscogee County		
Roseland	1	Fulton County		
Rosemont	1	Columbia County	30802	
Rosemont Park	1	Floyd County	30161	
Rosier	1	Burke County	30434	
Rosin Ford	1	Wayne County		
Ross	1	Crisp County		
Ross	1	Madison County		
Ross	1	Wayne County		
Rosser	1	Wayne County		
Rossignol Hill	1	Chatham County	31408	
Rossville	1	Walker County	30741	
Roswell	1	Fulton County	30075	77
Round Oak	1	Jones County	31038	
Roundtop	1	Gilmer County		
Routons Crossroads	1	Meriwether County		
Rover	1	Spalding County	30292	
Rowena	1	Early County	31713	
Rowland	1	Dodge County		
Rowland Springs	1	Bartow County		
Roxanna	1	Paulding County	30132	
Roy	1	Bibb County		
Royal	1	Bleckley County		
Royston	3	Franklin County	30662	
Royston	3	Hart County	30662	
Royston	3	Madison County	30662	
Ruby	1	Jones County		
Ruckersville	1	Elbert County	30635	
Rudden	1	Putnam County	31024	
Ruden	1	Pickens County		
Rupert	1	Taylor County	31081	
Rush	1	Webster County		
Ruskin	1	Ware County		
Ruskin Heights	1	Muscogee County		
Russell	1	Barrow County	30680	
Russellville	1	Monroe County	31016	
Rutland	1	Bibb County		
Rutledge	1	Morgan County	30663	
Rydal	1	Bartow County	30171	
Ryo	1	Gordon County	30139	

== See also ==
- Georgia (U.S. state)
- List of counties in Georgia (U.S. state)
- List of municipalities in Georgia (U.S. state)
