= Poplar Springs =

Poplar Springs may refer to:

- Poplar Springs, Georgia, an unincorporated community in Catoosa County
- Poplar Springs, Maryland, a town in Howard County
- Poplar Springs, Stokes County, North Carolina, an unincorporated community
- Poplar Springs, Surry County, North Carolina, an unincorporated community
- Poplar Springs (Virginia), a historic home in Charles City County

== See also ==
- Poplar Spring
