= Tropical Storm Fay (2008) =

Atlantic tropical storm in 2008

- Tropical Storm Fay over Florida at peak strength on August 19

Meteorological history
- Formed: August 15, 2008
- Extratropical: August 27, 2008
- Dissipated: August 29, 2008

Tropical storm
- 1-minute sustained (SSHWS/NWS)
- Highest winds: 70 mph (110 km/h)
- Lowest pressure: 986 mbar (hPa); 29.12 inHg

Overall effects
- Fatalities: 36 (13 direct, 23 indirect)
- Damage: $560 million (2008 USD)
- Areas affected: Leeward Islands, Puerto Rico, Hispaniola, Jamaica, Cayman Islands, Cuba, Florida, Georgia, Alabama, Mississippi, Louisiana, Arkansas, North Carolina, Tennessee, Kentucky, West Virginia and Ohio
- IBTrACS
- Part of the 2008 Atlantic hurricane season

Tropical Storm Fay was a long-lived tropical cyclone that moved erratically across the state of Florida and the Caribbean Sea. The sixth named storm of the 2008 Atlantic hurricane season, Fay formed from a vigorous tropical wave on August 15 over the Dominican Republic. It passed over the island of Hispaniola, into the Gulf of Gonâve, across the island of Cuba, and made landfall on the Florida Keys late in the afternoon of August 18 before veering into the Gulf of Mexico. It again made landfall near Naples, Florida, in the early hours of August 19 and progressed northeast through the Florida peninsula, emerging into the Atlantic Ocean near Melbourne on August 20. Extensive flooding took place in parts of Florida as a result of its slow movement. On August 21, it made landfall again near New Smyrna Beach, Florida, moving due west across the Panhandle, crossing Gainesville and Panama City, Florida. As it zigzagged from water to land, it became the first storm in recorded history to make landfall in Florida four times. Thirty-six deaths were blamed on Fay. The storm also resulted in one of the most prolific tropical cyclone related tornado outbreaks on record. A total of 81 tornadoes touched down across five states, three of which were rated as EF2. Fay would cause around $560 million in damages throughout its lifespan.

== Meteorological history ==
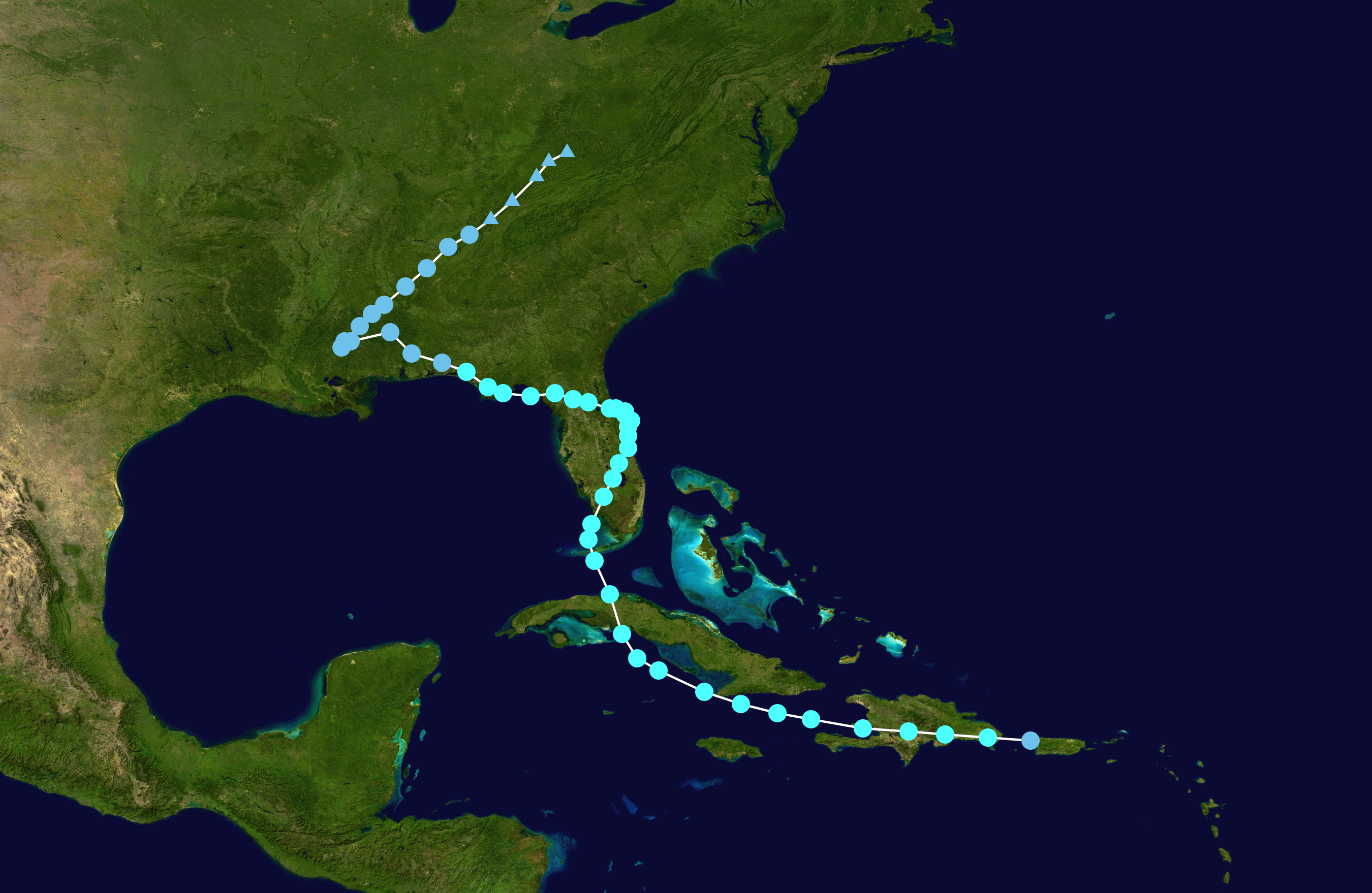
Map plotting the storm's track and intensity, according to the Saffir–Simpson scale Map key Saffir–Simpson scale Tropical depression (≤38 mph, ≤62 km/h) Tropical storm (39–73 mph, 63–118 km/h) Category 1 (74–95 mph, 119–153 km/h) Category 2 (96–110 mph, 154–177 km/h) Category 3 (111–129 mph, 178–208 km/h) Category 4 (130–156 mph, 209–251 km/h) Category 5 (≥157 mph, ≥252 km/h) Unknown Storm type Tropical cyclone Subtropical cyclone Extratropical cyclone, remnant low, tropical disturbance, or monsoon depression

A tropical wave moved off the coast of Africa on August 7 without any significant convection, with an associated low pressure area moving southwestward away from the coast. It passed just south of the Cape Verde Islands, and tracked generally westward with a subtropical ridge centered to its north over the Azores. Late on August 9, an area of convection developed in association with the wave. With generally favorable conditions for development, the system began slowly organizing, to the extent that on August 10, the National Hurricane Center (NHC) remarked for its potential to become a tropical depression in a few days. By August 11, however, the thunderstorm activity became disorganized and limited, though the next day convection reformed by the time it was located about 650 mi (1,050 km) east of the Lesser Antilles. The hurricane hunters first flew into the system on August 12, though the flight only reported a broad area of low pressure.

After the hurricane hunters' flight, the system became disorganized as environmental conditions became less favorable, and by late on August 13 the convection was limited and well-removed from the low center. The next day, thunderstorm activity increased and organized, though another hurricane hunters flight confirmed the system did not develop into a tropical cyclone. After passing over the northern Lesser Antilles, the system moved over the Virgin Islands and Puerto Rico, maintaining an area of deep convection. It became better defined as it moved through the Mona Passage, and a hurricane hunters flight confirmed the presence of a closed circulation. A reconnaissance flight measured wind gusts of 56 miles per hour (90 km/h) and was designated as Tropical Storm Fay late on August 15 as the cyclone moved ashore along eastern Dominican Republic. Initially, it was forecast to steadily intensify before and after crossing Cuba, later reaching minimal hurricane status in the eastern Gulf of Mexico; the HWRF hurricane model predicted for Fay to become a strong hurricane off the coast of western Florida.

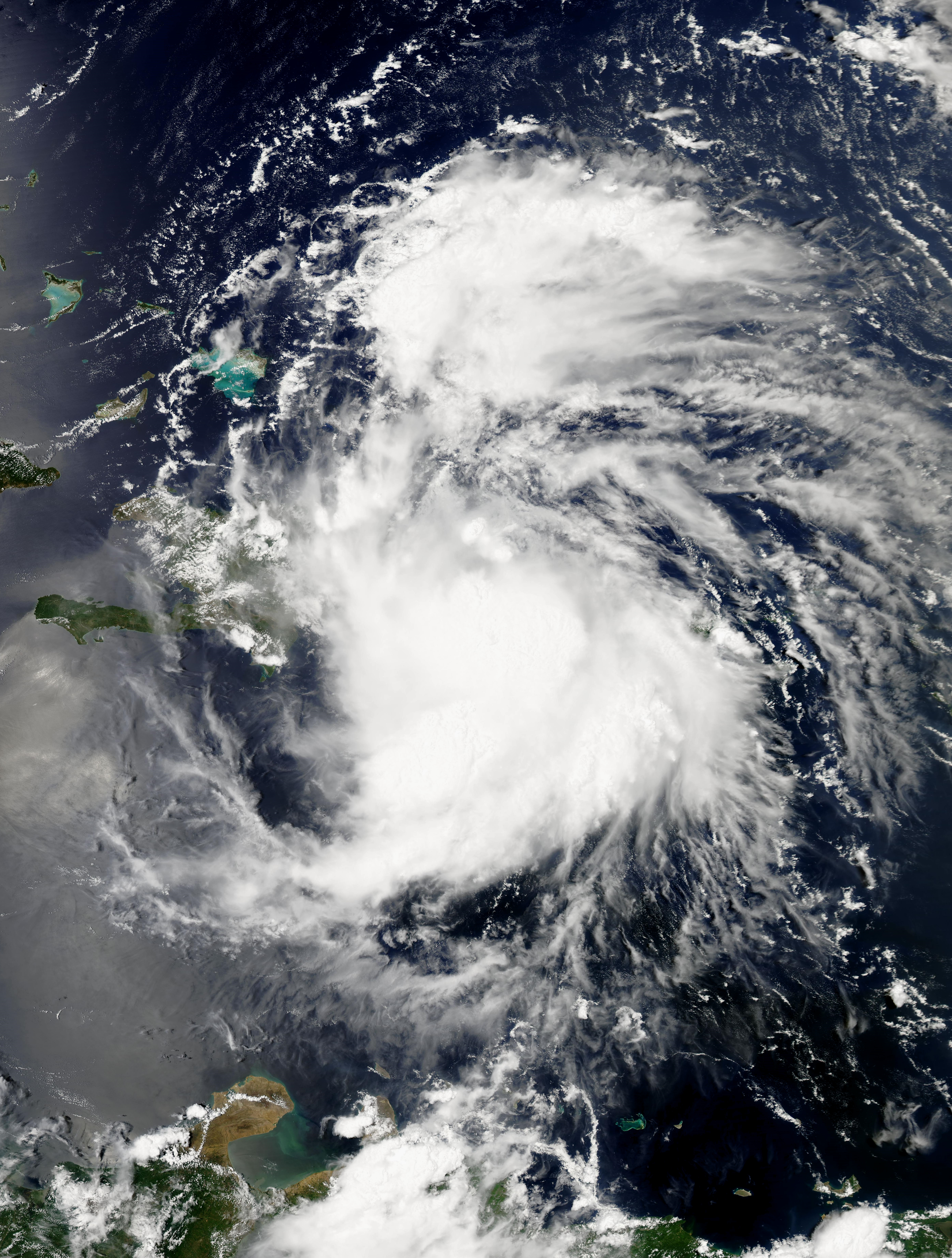
Tropical Storm Fay causing heavy rainfall to Hispaniola

Upon first becoming a tropical cyclone, Tropical Storm Fay was moving steadily westward over Hispaniola, influenced by a ridge to its north. At around 1200 UTC on August 16, the storm emerged into the Gulf of Gonâve, with little organized convection near the center. Environmental conditions favored strengthening, and convection quickly developed over the center. By early on August 17, a hurricane hunters flight reported a better organized circulation center, and satellite images displayed well-established outflow within a large convection envelope. After passing near or over southwestern Granma Province in Cuba, upper-level wind shear increased slightly, and the convection diminished near the center. The storm turned more to the northwest, due to a trough weakening the ridge to its north. However, at this time, the ECMWF forecast had Fay making landfall in Southwest Florida, crossing into the Atlantic, then tracking westward across the Florida Panhandle – which is exactly what it would end up doing.

Fay made four Florida landfalls, first at Key West in the late afternoon of August 18, then early the following morning at Cape Romano south of Naples as a 65 mph (105 km/h) tropical storm. Later that day, while crossing central Florida, Fay unexpectedly strengthened over land to just under hurricane intensity with 70 mph (110 km/h) winds and a pressure of 986 mbar, which is a stronger intensity than Fay had ever obtained over open ocean. According to some local meteorologists, Fay actually gained strength over Florida's inland waters, including the vast expanses of the Florida Everglades and Lake Okeechobee The storm developed an eye feature, and continued to hold its strength for the rest of the day. After many hours of land interaction, Fay began to weaken. Fay regained some strength, however, after leaving land at Melbourne and heading northward over the warm Atlantic Ocean waters, only to be deflected westward as it encountered a high pressure ridge. This resulted in another landfall at Flagler Beach in the afternoon of August 21. Fay then emerged into the northeastern Gulf of Mexico and made its fourth landfall on the morning of August 23 near Carrabelle in the Florida Panhandle. Fay narrowly missed making yet another landfall, the center staying barely onshore while passing Panama City and St. Andrews Bay. Fay then weakened to a depression later that day. For the next several days, Fay was a slow moving tropical depression. Fay started moving to the northeast over southern Mississippi, where it moved over Alabama and finally dissipated on August 27 over Georgia.

== Preparations ==
When advisories were first issued on Tropical Storm Fay late on August 15, tropical storm warnings were issued across the entire northern coast of the Hispaniola and Eastern Cuba as well as Southeastern Bahamas with tropical storm watches issued in parts of Northeastern Cuba and the Central Bahamas. The storm tracked far enough south for the Bahamas watches and warnings to be cancelled, but additional tropical storm warnings were issued for all of the coast Haiti. Additional tropical storm watches and warnings were issued in Jamaica, the Cayman Islands, Florida, Georgia, Alabama, Mississippi, and Louisiana. With Fay repeatedly being forecasted to become a hurricane, hurricane watches were issued in parts of Central Cuba as well as Southwestern Florida. A hurricane warning was issued for Southwestern Florida on August 18. Fay's unexpected strengthening over land prompted a hurricane watch to briefly be issued for Northeastern Florida and Southeastern Georgia on August 19.

== Impact ==
=== Caribbean ===
Deaths by country
Dominican Republic	4
Haiti	10
Jamaica	1
United States	21
Total	36

Wettest tropical cyclones and their remnants in the Bahamas Highest-known totals
Precipitation			Storm	Location	Ref.
Rank	mm	in	Storm	Location	Ref.
1	747.5	29.43	Noel 2007	Long Island	
2	580.1	22.84	Dorian 2019	Hope Town	
3	500.3	19.70	Matthew 2016	Matthew Town, Inagua	
4	436.6	17.19	Flora 1963	Duncan Town	
5	390.1	15.36	Inez 1966	Nassau Airport	
6	337.1	13.27	Fox 1952	New Providence	
7	321.1	12.64	Michelle 2001	Nassau	
8	309.4	12.18	Erin 1995	Church Grove	
9	260.0	9.88	Fay 2008	Freeport	
10	236.7	9.32	Floyd 1999	Little Harbor Abacos	

On August 15, the weather disturbance that would become Fay made landfall on Hispaniola. The system developed into a tropical storm while producing heavy rains on the island, prompting a major flash flood threat. The storm caused minor damage in Dominican Republic including falling trees and flooding, this caused most of the flights into and out of the country to be canceled. At least four people were killed after being swept away by flood waters in the Dominican Republic.

In Haiti, Fay's winds and rainfall damaged the agricultural sector, including rice fields and banana crops. One person died after being swept away by flood-waters while trying to cross a swollen river. Two infants were killed when a bus flipped in Haiti. In total, ten deaths were blamed on Fay in Haiti.

In Jamaica, one person was killed as a result of a vehicle being swept away in flood waters. In total, 15 people died in the Caribbean.

Despite making landfall in central Cuba, exact impact from Fay in that nation is unknown.

=== United States ===
==== Florida ====
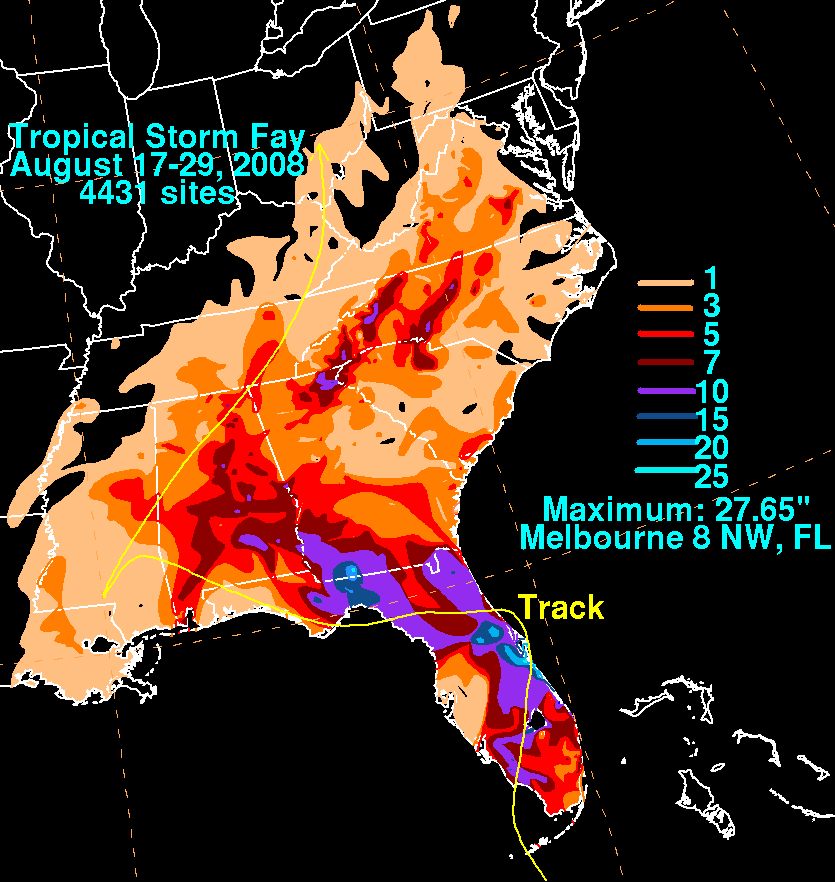
Rainfall produced by Fay in the United States

Tropical Storm Fay strengthening and then weakening as it passes over south-central Florida, featuring a hurricane-like eye over land

During seven days in Florida, August 18–24, 2008, eleven people died and thousands of homes plus roads were damaged, from 60 mph (97 km/h) winds and rain waters up to 5 feet (1.5 m) deep, with flooded rivers or tornadoes, as Fay traveled through the entire state. Making initial landfall in the Florida Keys and coming ashore again in the Naples area, Fay then crossed the state and exited near New Smyrna Beach, coming onshore again near St. Augustine and Jacksonville, crossing the Panhandle and finally leaving the Pensacola area into Alabama, early on August 24. Returning from Mississippi towards Tennessee, Fay continued to dump heavy rains around Pensacola, Tallahassee, and Panama City even during August 25.

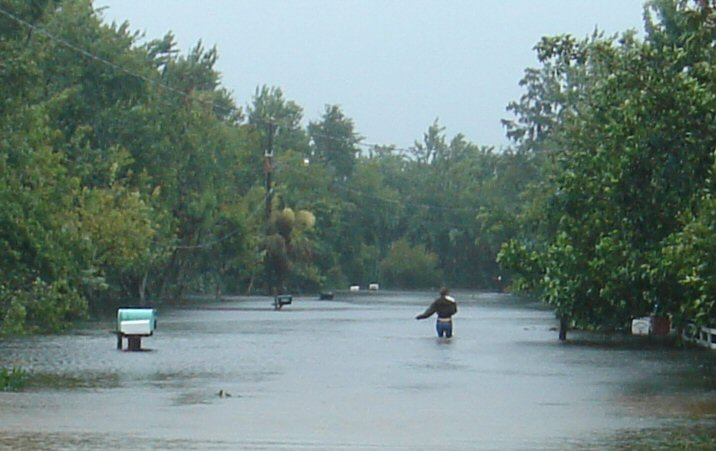
Flooding in east-central Florida

While Fay was moving across South-Central Florida, a tornado, rated EF2 on the Enhanced Fujita Scale, took place after landfall in Wellington, Florida, where significant damage was reported including doors and windows blown off houses, many trees knocked down and reports of a weak building destroyed. Another tornado damaged 51 homes with nine of them rendered uninhabitable in Barefoot Bay. According to the St. Lucie County Public Safety Department, about 8,000 homes were damaged from flooding. The city of Melbourne shattered a 50-year-old rainfall record after receiving 11 inches (28 cm) of rain in a 24‑hour period. About 80 neighborhoods in Melbourne were flooded, and a "couple hundred" homes in southeast Melbourne were filled with three to four feet of water, according to a press statement. One neighborhood was particularly hard hit: Lamplighter Village along John Rodes Boulevard in Melbourne, FL. The flooding was so extensive that Governor Charlie Crist personally visited the neighborhood to assess the damage. A tornado touched down in Stuart on U.S. 1 at Monroe Street, flipping a truck and damaging a gas station. A 28-year-old kite surfer was critically injured in Fort Lauderdale when winds associated with a Tropical Storm Fay feeder band slammed him face-first into the ground and then dragged him across the streets until he hit a building, which was filmed by a WFOR camera crew.

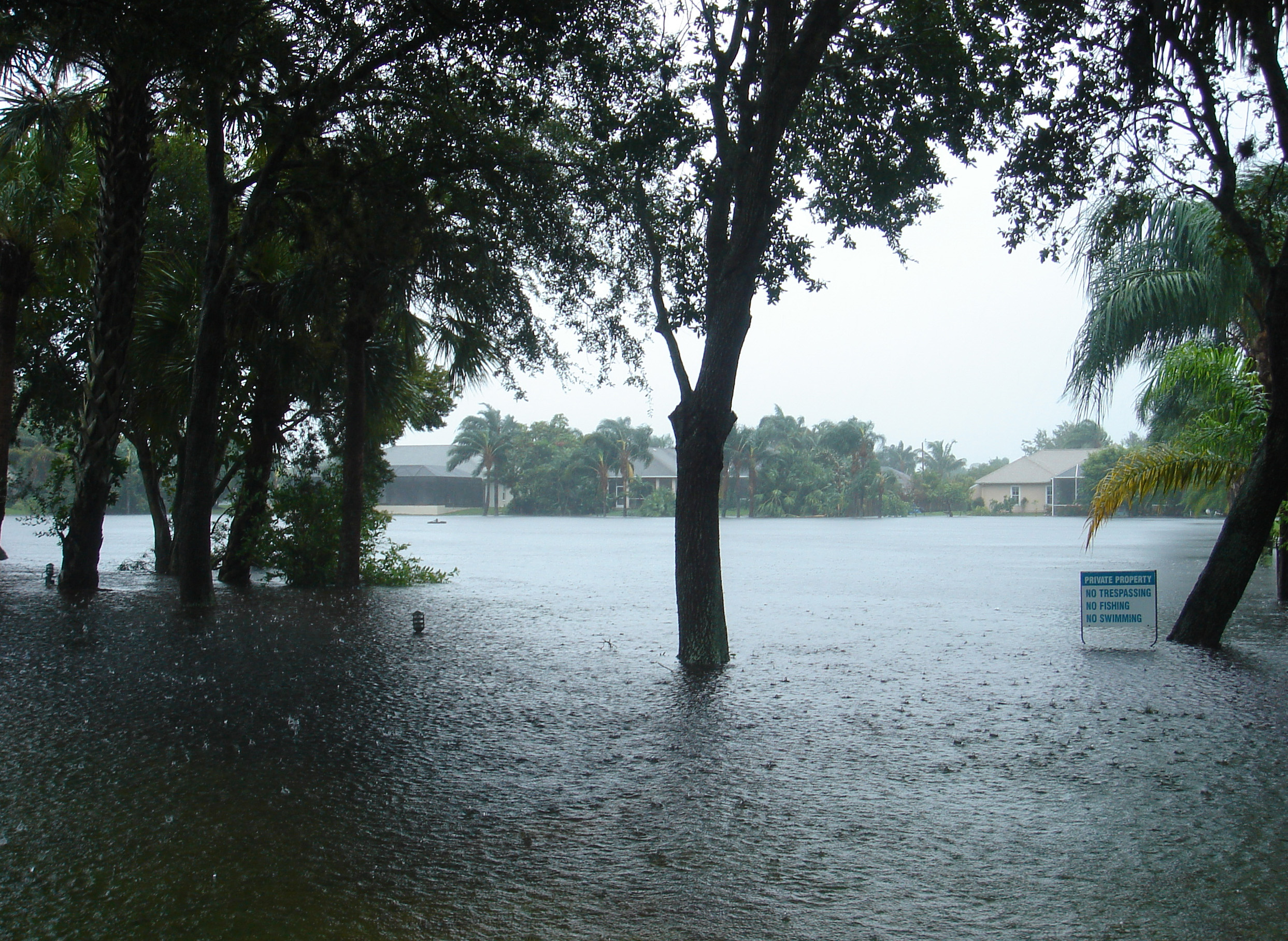
Flooding on Merritt Island, Florida during Tropical Storm Fay

Areas of the state received up to 25 inches (64 cm) of rain, causing serious flooding. Native wildlife, including alligators, were seen in flooded neighborhoods after high water forced them from their habitat. Hundreds of homes were flooded in Brevard and St. Lucie counties; some locations were inundated with up to 5 feet (1.5 m) of standing water. Early estimates from Brevard county show $10 to $12 million in damages to homes and infrastructure. Tropical Storm Fay resulted in the drowning of one person swimming off Neptune Beach and another swimmer in Duval County. Meanwhile, another 3 were killed in traffic accidents. On August 21, President George W. Bush declared the entire state of Florida a Federal Disaster Area. Seminole County also got hard hit by floods. Seminole County Public Schools were closed due to many roads being impassable. Many rivers in the county such as the St. Johns River, the Econlockhatchee River, and the Little Econlockhatchee River jumped their banks. Riverside Park in Oviedo was under four feet of flood water due to the Little Econlockhatchee River. On the evening of August 22, a tornado damaged four homes and a bridge in Lake Wales.

After moving into the Florida Panhandle, five more people were killed as a result of Fay in Florida (all indirect), including an electrocution which happened to an electrical worker doing repairs in Gadsden County.

==== Georgia, Alabama, Mississippi ====
Fay over the southeastern United States on August 23

Heavy rain was also reported in parts of Alabama, Georgia and Mississippi. A young boy was killed in Grady County, Georgia when he was swept away in a drainage ditch by floodwaters. Another drowning death took place in Elmore County, Alabama as a result of the weakening Fay. On August 22, 2008, radio station WNUZ, located in Alabama, "suffered direct lightning strikes" during Fay which resulted in "the complete destruction of the station's transmitter" and caused unspecified damage to other electrical broadcast equipment at the station. The station applied to the Federal Communications Commission (FCC) for authority to stay silent while their engineers repaired or replaced the damaged gear and evaluated the station's other equipment. On December 24, 2008, WNUZ was granted permission to remain off the air until no later than June 22, 2009.

Fay persisted as a tropical storm from its first landfall until weakening to a tropical depression on August 23. It eventually weakened to a remnant low over Alabama on August 26, from which 8 tornadoes were spawned in Alabama and 6 in Georgia, injuring two in Commerce, Georgia.

High winds damaged the water tower in Midway, Alabama, compounding problems the town was experiencing with its water wells. A loan from the National Rural Water Association and assistance from Alabama Rural Water Association allowed Midway to make repairs and maintain the water supply. The heavy and persistent rains associated with Fay, however, helped to temporarily alleviate the extreme drought conditions over northern Georgia, northern Alabama, and eastern Tennessee.

==== Elsewhere ====
Heavy rains in Tennessee triggered flash flooding throughout eastern portions of the state. In Shelby County, flooding covered several cars, trapping several people. In all, Fay caused $20,000 in damages in Tennessee. Rains in South Carolina caused a bridge in York County to collapse, leaving $100,000 in damages. Severe flooding in North Carolina, particularly in Mecklenburg County damaged numerous homes. Near Charlotte, 148 buildings sustained major damage from floodwaters and numerous roads were shut down due to high waters. Damage in Mecklenburg alone amounted to $8.5 million. In Cabarrus County, 14 swift water rescues were undertaken due to cars being stranded in flooded roads. About 70 homes were damaged in the county, leaving $1 million in damages. Damages to roads in the county were estimated at $5.5 million. In all, Fay caused roughly $15 million in damage in North Carolina.

== Records ==
Fay was the first storm on record to hit the same U.S. state on four separate occasions, beating a record set by Hurricane Gordon of 1994, and was just the third storm on record to hit the U.S. at least 3 times, the third was Hurricane Juan in 1985, although Juan did not hit the same state three times; one of its landfalls was in Alabama, and the other 2 were in Louisiana. Fay was the first storm to prompt storm warnings for the entire coast of Florida; the four separate landfalls were responsible for every stretch of the Florida coast to receive a Tropical Storm Watch or Warning, or a Hurricane Watch or Warning.

The two highest rainfall amounts recorded were 27.65 inches (702 mm) at Windover Farms, 8 miles (13 km) northwest of Melbourne, Florida, and 27.50 inches (698 mm) at Thomasville, Georgia.

== Tornadoes ==
=== Daily statistics ===
Daily statistics
Date	Total	Enhanced Fujita scale rating						Deaths	Injuries
Date	Total	EF0	EF1	EF2	EF3	EF4	EF5	Deaths	Injuries
August 18	3	3	0	0	0	0	0	0	0
August 19	4	2	1	1	0	0	0	0	2
August 20	0	0	0	0	0	0	0	0	0
August 21	0	0	0	0	0	0	0	0	0
August 22	5	5	0	0	0	0	0	0	0
August 23	3	2	1	0	0	0	0	0	0
August 24	3	3	0	0	0	0	0	0	0
August 25	12	5	6	1	0	0	0	0	0
August 26	14	6	7	1	0	0	0	0	3
August 27	6	6	0	0	0	0	0	0	0
Total	50	32	15	3	0	0	0	0	5

=== List of tornadoes ===
List of confirmed tornadoes during the 2008 Tropical Storm Fay tornado outbreak (Note: All dates are based on the local time zone where the tornado touched down; however, all times are in Coordinated Universal Time for consistency.)
F#	Location	County / Parish	State	Coord.	Date	Time (UTC)	Path length	Max width	Summary
EF0	N of Big Coppitt Key	Monroe	FL	24.71°N 81.37°W	August 18	1655–1657	0.24 miles (390 m)	50 yd (46 m)	A waterspout formed north of the Seven Mile Bridge and moved onshore on Big Pine Key and downed a few trees.
EF0	WSW of Summerland Key	Monroe	FL	24.66°N 81.47°W	August 18	1800–1802	0.07 miles (110 m)	10 yd (9.1 m)	A waterspout was first observed near Ramrod Key before it moved onshore on Summerland Key. Several large tree limbs were snapped, a cable service line was torn from a house, and a 4x4 post was blown off a dock. A weather station recorded a 62 mph (100 km/h) gust during the event.
EF0	Hallandale Beach area	Broward	FL	25.98°N 80.13°W	August 18	2130–2131	0.25 miles (0.40 km)	25 yd (23 m)	A brief tornado tracked through Hallandale Beach, damaging a patio screen, flipping several boats, and downing trees.
EF2	SSE of Wellington	Palm Beach	FL	26.62°N 80.23°W	August 19	0529–0533	2.72 miles (4.38 km)	100 yd (91 m)	A strong tornado tracked through several subdivisions of Wellington, causing significant damage. The worst damage occurred at the Palm Beach Equine Clinic where two stables lost their roof, power poles were snapped, and many trees were downed. A heavy trailer at a polo club was tossed 40 yd (37 m) and an apartment building near Folkstone Circle lost 70 percent of its roof tiles. Damage from the tornado amounted to $1.25 million
EF0	Stuart area	Martin	FL	27.15°N 80.22°W	August 19	1411–1412	0.02 miles (32 m)	30 yd (27 m)	A brief tornado touched down in Stuart, damaging a panel truck and a nearby service station awning.
EF0	NW of White City	St. Lucie	FL	27.39°N 80.37°W	August 19	1635–1636	0.08 miles (130 m)	30 yd (27 m)	A brief tornado damaged the roof and interior ceiling of a warehouse in Fort Pierce.
EF1	W of Micco	Brevard	FL	27.88°N 80.51°W	August 19	1745–1750	0.33 miles (0.53 km)	30 yd (27 m)	A brief tornado struck the community of Barefoot Bay, destroying 9 mobile homes and damaging 59 more. The most severe damage to the homes consisted of collapsed exterior walls and removal of roofs. Dozens of smaller structures were impacted and two people sustained minor injuries. Damage amounted to $420,000.
No tornadoes touched down on August 20 and 21 as the right-front quadrant of Fay moved over the Atlantic
EF0	ESE of Bakersville	St. Johns	FL	29.88°N 81.43°W	August 22	1715–1716	0.59 miles (0.95 km)	10 yd (9.1 m)	Brief tornado reported by law enforcement.
EF0	Isle of Palms South	Duval	FL	30.26°N 81.44°W	August 22	1740–1742	0.17 miles (270 m)	100 yd (91 m)	Brief tornado snapped and twisted the tops of pine trees.
EF0	NE of Bostwick	Clay	FL	29.85°N 81.60°W	August 22	2125–2126	0.1 miles (160 m)	100 yd (91 m)	A waterspout reported along the St. Johns River briefly moved onshore in Clay County.
EF0	Fleming Island area	Clay	FL	30.04°N 81.71°W	August 22	2140–2147	1.32 miles (2.12 km)	100 yd (91 m)	Tornado caused widespread tree damage and impacted one home in Fleming Island.
EF0	NW of Lake Rosalie	Polk	FL	27.94°N 81.42°W	August 22	2225–2227	0.72 miles (1.16 km)	30 yd (27 m)	Waterspout formed over Lake Rosalie and briefly moved onshore near Camp Rosalie before dissipating. Five structures in the camp sustained minor roof damage.
EF1	N of Staunton	Cook	GA	31.29°N 83.47°W	August 23	2050–2053	1.4 miles (2.3 km)	75 yd (69 m)	Tornado formed near U.S. Route 41 and tracked northwest, passing over Interstate 75. Numerous trees were downed and a barn sustained heavy damage along its path.
EF0	ENE of Palatka Municipal Airport	Putnam	FL	29.66°N 81.66°W	August 23	2153–2201	3.74 miles (6.02 km)	100 yd (91 m)	Tornado began as a waterspout near Highway 17 and tracked north toward Bostwick. Public reports indicated a tornado was on the ground, though no damage occurred.
EF0	ESE of Capps	Jefferson	FL	30.41°N 83.93°W	August 23	2212–2213	0.2 miles (320 m)	50 yd (46 m)	A short-lived tornado snapped the tops off many pine trees.
EF0	WNW of Ware	Elmore	AL	32.46°N 86.11°W	August 24	1907–1907	0.04 miles (64 m)	20 yd (18 m)	Public report of a brief tornado in the Emerald Valley area of Elmore County; no damage occurred.
EF0	SW of Wetona	Coosa	AL	32.76°N 86.36°W	August 24	1912–1912	0.01 miles (16 m)	20 yd (18 m)	Public report of a brief tornado near the Coosa–Elmore County line close to the Coosa River; no damage occurred.
EF0	Arley area	Winston	AL	34.09°N 87.22°W	August 24	2324–2324	0.05 miles (80 m)	20 yd (18 m)	Brief tornado touched down in Arley and downed several street signs, one of which was blown into a power pole and snapped it.
EF0	SSE of Prattville-Grouby Field	Autauga	AL	32.16°N 86.43°W	August 25	1225–1225	0.05 miles (80 m)	20 yd (18 m)	Brief tornado snapped several trees along Interstate 65.
EF0	NE of Corcoran	Pike	AL	32.86°N 85.95°W	August 25	1318–1319	0.45 miles (0.72 km)	75 yd (69 m)	Brief tornado destroyed an outbuilding and damaged several structures; 15 trees were snapped along its path.
EF1	WNW of Arguta	Dale	AL	31.58°N 85.16°W	August 25	1320–1322	0.44 miles (0.71 km)	75 yd (69 m)	Brief tornado uprooted several trees and heavily damaged a barn.
EF1	SE of St. Clair Springs	St. Clair	AL	33.75°N 86.38°W	August 25	1556–1606	3.38 miles (5.44 km)	100 yd (91 m)	Tornado touched down northeast of the Saint Clair Correctional Facility and tracked northwest. Numerous trees were downed along its path, some of which fell on homes and caused damage.
EF1	SSE of Allgood	Blount	AL	33.86°N 86.47°W	August 25	1625–1626	0.41 miles (0.66 km)	60 yd (55 m)	Tornado touched down along the shore of Inland Lake and tracked across it before moving back on land. Numerous trees were downed, two buildings sustained minor damage, and a few power poles were downed.
EF2	NW of Chulafinnee	Cleburne	AL	33.58°N 85.68°W	August 25	1706–1707	0.46 miles (0.74 km)	400 yd (370 m)	Brief but strong tornado caused significant damage to a gas station and convenience store and downed 100–200 trees.
EF1	SW of Old Davisville	Calhoun	AL	33.64°N 85.68°W	August 25	1711–1711	0.01 miles (16 m)	50 yd (46 m)	Brief tornado significantly damaged one home.
EF1	NNE of Choccolocco	Calhoun	AL	33.68°N 85.69°W	August 25	1719–1720	1.1 miles (1.8 km)	250 yd (230 m)	Brief tornado destroyed an auto shop and damaged three homes. Approximately 50–100 trees were snapped or uprooted along its path.
EF0	ESE of Jacobs	Jackson	FL	30.88°N 85.36°W	August 25	2226–2227	0.2 miles (320 m)	50 yd (46 m)	Brief tornado with no damage.
EF0	SSW of Enon	Pike	AL	31.81°N 85.73°W	August 25	2258–2258	0.01 miles (16 m)	20 yd (18 m)	Brief tornado snapped or uprooted several trees.
EF1	SSE of Gordon	Houston	AL	31.12°N 85.08°W	August 25	0026–0027	0.2 miles (320 m)	20 yd (18 m)	Brief tornado downed several trees, one of which fell on a mobile home and destroyed it.
EF0	N of Enterprise	Miller	GA	31.17°N 84.83°W	August 25	0202–0205	0.95 miles (1.53 km)	75 yd (69 m)	Tornado damaged a barn, mobile home, and irrigation pivot and uprooted trees.
EF0	SW of Percale	Monroe	GA	33.06°N 83.80°W	August 26	1610–1611	0.29 miles (0.47 km)	50 yd (46 m)	Brief tornado with no damage.
EF0	NW of Fort Lawn	Chester	SC	34.72°N 80.92°W	August 26	1618–1618	0.1 miles (160 m)	20 yd (18 m)	Brief tornado downed several trees and power lines.
EF1	NNE of Gainesville	Hall	GA	34.37°N 83.36°W	August 26	1625–1627	1.14 miles (1.83 km)	200 yd (180 m)	Tornado downed about 200 trees; 20 homes sustained damage from fallen trees.
EF1	S of Reed Creek to NE of Townville	Hart, Anderson	GA, SC	34.44°N 82.92°W	August 26	1818–1836	12.44 miles (20.02 km)	30 yd (27 m)	Tornado moved along an intermittent path near the Georgia–South Carolina border, downing many trees and power lines. Some structural damage occurred near Reed Creek. After crossing Lake Hartwell, the tornado moved into South Carolina and remained over mostly wooded areas before dissipating.
EF1	S of Cherrys	Pickens, Oconee	SC	34.59°N 82.87°W	August 26	1836–1850	6.83 miles (10.99 km)	30 yd (27 m)	Tornado touched down along the Pickens–Oconee County line and downed several trees and power lines along an intermittent path. The tornado caused minor structural damage around the Memorial Stadium in Clemson University.
EF0	NNE of Six Mile	Pickens	SC	34.83°N 82.81°W	August 26	1920–1920	0.1 miles (160 m)	30 yd (27 m)	Brief tornado downed power lines along Highway 137.
EF2	WSW of Sandy Springs	Anderson, Pickens	SC	34.58°N 82.81°W	August 26	1935–1947	5.48 miles (8.82 km)	30 yd (27 m)	Tornado touched down along Highway 187 where it damaged a home and downed trees. Tracking northward, the storm intensified and snapped numerous large trees near the Anderson–Pickens County line. Damage in the area was rated EF2. The tornado continued into the south side of Clemson University campus before dissipating.
EF1	SW of Oakwood	Hall	GA	34.21°N 83.89°W	August 26	1938–1949	4.82 miles (7.76 km)	200 yd (180 m)	An intermittent tornado first touched down southwest of Oakwood and remained on the ground for 0.75 mi (1.21 km). Along this portion of the track, ten homes and the local elementary school sustained minor roof damage. Five minutes later, the tornado touched down again to the southwest of Gainesville and tracked for 2.25 mi (3.62 km). Fifteen homes in the El Rancho Estates and the Lyman Elementary School sustained minor damage. Losses from the tornado amounted to $750,000.
EF1	SSW of Donaldson Air Force Base	Greenville	SC	34.64°N 82.38°W	August 26	2005–2017	6.09 miles (9.80 km)	30 yd (27 m)	A tornado destroyed a large garage, removed shingles from homes, and downed trees about 5 mi (8.0 km) east of Pelzer.
EF1	SW of Gillsville	Hall	GA	34.33°N 83.71°W	August 26	2020–2022	0.77 miles (1.24 km)	100 yd (91 m)	A brief tornado touched down southwest of Gillsville and removed a roof from a home. Three other homes sustained minor to moderate damage and 20 trees were downed.
EF1	NNE of Arcade	Jackson	GA	34.12°N 83.55°W	August 26	2030–2047	7.64 miles (12.30 km)	100 yd (91 m)	An intermittent tornado first touched down north-northeast of Arcade where it downed a few tree limbs before lifting. The storm then touched down again in the city of Commerce and tracked for 1.25 mi (2.01 km) before lifting near the Jackson–Banks County line. Forty trees were downed by the tornado, many of which fell on mobile homes and caused significant damage. Three mobile homes were destroyed, resulting in three injuries, and fifteen others were damaged.
EF0	NE of Shelton	Fairfield	SC	34.52°N 81.40°W	August 26	2242–2248	4.85 miles (7.81 km)	60 yd (55 m)	Tornado caused minor tree damage.
EF0	NNW of Mallorysville	Wilkes	GA	33.90°N 82.78°W	August 26	2255–2307	5.06 miles (8.14 km)	100 yd (91 m)	Tornado moved an anchored mobile home 6 ft (1.8 m) off its foundation and caused minor shingle damage to another home along Highway 17. Numerous trees were downed along the entire path.
EF0	W of Cornwell	Chester	SC	34.60°N 81.20°W	August 26	2312–2312	0.1 miles (160 m)	20 yd (18 m)	Brief tornado downed trees and power lines.
EF0	S of Salem	Randolph	NC	35.82°N 79.80°W	August 27	1630–1635	0.5 miles (0.80 km)	50 yd (46 m)	Brief tornado damaged two outbuildings and downed many trees. Cement yard statues and a light carport were tossed across a road.
EF0	ENE of Surf City	Pender	NC	34.43°N 77.53°W	August 27	1705–1706	0.02 miles (32 m)	10 yd (9.1 m)	Waterspout briefly moved onshore and tossed pool furniture.
EF0	ESE of Archer	Johnston	NC	35.71°N 78.33°W	August 27	1744–1746	0.25 miles (0.40 km)	50 yd (46 m)	Brief tornado snapped or uprooted many trees in a densely forested area.
EF0	E of Scotts Crossroads	Wilson	NC	35.73°N 78.03°W	August 27	1750–1755	4.47 miles (7.19 km)	50 yd (46 m)	Local law enforcement reported a tornado "bouncing" along a path extending from Highway 42 to Interstate 95, remaining over tobacco and soy fields for its entire duration.
EF0	S of Crutchfield Crossroads	Chatham	NC	35.78°N 79.42°W	August 27	2008–2013	2.63 miles (4.23 km)	100 yd (91 m)	Weak tornado caused significant damage to an outbuilding and minor damage to several other structures. Many large trees were downed along its path.
EF0	NE of Fremont	Wayne, Wilson	NC	35.58°N 77.93°W	August 27	0457–0505	1.94 miles (3.12 km)	100 yd (91 m)	Tornado touched down over a corn field before impacting several farms. A barn was destroyed and a nearby home sustained minor damage; debris from the structures was blown up to 100 yd (91 m) away. After crossing a soy field, the tornado caused a second barn to collapse before temporarily lifting. It briefly touched down a short time after and caused minor damage to a few mobile homes and outbuildings before dissipating.

== See also ==
- Tropical cyclones in 2008
- List of Florida hurricanes (2000–present)
- Other storms of the same name
- Hurricane Charley (2004) – Took a similar path across the Caribbean and the Florida peninsula
