= WPPT =

WPPT may refer to:

- WPPT (TV), a television station (channel 9, virtual channel 35) licensed to serve Philadelphia, Pennsylvania, United States
- WPPT (AM), a radio station (1230 AM) formerly licensed to serve Talladega, Alabama, United States
- WIKG, a radio station (92.1 FM) licensed to serve Mercerburg, Pennsylvania, United States, which used the call sign WPPT from 2005 to 2012
- WFLF-FM, a radio station (94.5 FM) licensed to serve Parker, Florida, United States, which used the call sign WPPT from 1999 to 2002
- WOFX-FM, a radio station (92.5 FM) licensed to serve Cincinnati, Ohio, United States, which used the call sign WPPT from 1994 to 1995
- WIPO Performances and Phonograms Treaty, an international treaty
