= Rabbit Hill (disambiguation) =

Rabbit Hill is a children's novel by Robert Lawson

Rabbit Hill may also refer to:

- Rabbit Hill, Georgia, an unincorporated community
- Rabbit Hill, West Virginia, an unincorporated community in Brooke County
- Rabbit Hill Historic District, in Medway, Massachusetts
- Rabbit Hill Snow Resort, in Alberta, Canada
- Rabbit Hill (Newbury Park), a knoll in Newbury Park, CA
- Peter's Rock, a peak in North Haven, Connecticut
