= WNUZ =

WNUZ may refer to:

- WNUZ-LP, a low-power radio station (92.9 FM) licensed to serve Gap, Pennsylvania, United States
- WIKG, a radio station (92.1 FM) licensed to serve Mercersburg, Pennsylvania, which held the call sign WNUZ from 2012 to 2019
- WPPT (AM), a defunct radio station (1230 AM) formerly licensed to serve Talladega, Alabama, United States, which held the call sign WNUZ from 1959 to 2012
