= Ocee =

Ocee may refer to two locations in the United States:

- Ocee, Georgia
- Ocee, Texas
