= Rivertown =

Rivertown may refer to:

- a town on a river
- Peter Hessler's book from 2001 about the town of Fuling on the Yangtze in Sichuan, China
- Rivertown, a neighbourhood on the Detroit International Riverfront in Detroit, Michigan, USA
- Rivertown, Georgia, an unincorporated community
- Rivertown, a themed area at Dreamworld amusement park in Gold Coast, Australia
- Rivertown, an area of Kings Island amusement park in Mason, Ohio, USA
- Rivertown Junction, a themed area at Dollywood amusement park in Pigeon Forge, Tennessee, USA
- RiverTown Crossings, a shopping mall in Grandville, Michigan, USA
- Rivertown, a neighborhood in Kenner, Louisiana, USA
- RiverTown, a community in St. Johns County, Florida, USA
- Rivertown Newspaper Group, a publisher of newspapers in Wisconsin
- "Rivertown", a song from the Fascination (album) album by The Greencards
- Wharf at Rivertown in Chester, Pennsylvania, USA
- Lofts at Rivertown, the current name for the Frederick Stearns Building
- Rivertown Beer, brewed at Hertford since 2017.

== See also ==
- Riverton (disambiguation)
- Town River
