= Parkertown =

Parkertown may refer to:

- Parkertown, Georgia
- Parkertown, New Jersey
