= Philema, Georgia =

Unincorporated community in Georgia, U.S.

Coordinates: 31°45′15″N 84°01′01″W

Philema is an unincorporated community in Lee County, in the U.S. state of Georgia.

== History ==
A post office called Philema was established in 1892, and remained in operation until 1917. The community takes its name from nearby Philema Branch.
