= Pedenville, Georgia =

Unincorporated community in Georgia, U.S.

Coordinates: 33°07′22″N 84°29′47″W

Pedenville is an unincorporated community in Pike County, in the U.S. state of Georgia.

== History ==
A post office called Pedenville was established in 1897, and remained in operation until 1905. The community was named after Reverend A. G. Peden, an early settler.
