= Riverton =

Riverton is the name of several places:

In Australia

- Riverton, South Australia, a small town and former railway junction in the mid north of South Australia
- Riverton, Western Australia, a suburb of Perth, Western Australia
  - Electoral district of Riverton, an electorate of the Western Australian Legislative Assembly, centred on the suburb

In Canada

- Riverton, Manitoba, a small village
- Riverton, Nova Scotia, a small community in Pictou County

In Jamaica

- Riverton City, Jamaica

In New Zealand

- Riverton / Aparima, a small town at the bottom of the South Island of New Zealand

In South Africa

- Riverton, a resort on the Vaal River outside Kimberley, Northern Cape

In the United States of America

- Riverton, California
- Riverton, Connecticut, a community in the town of Barkhamsted
  - Riverton Historic District (Barkhamsted, Connecticut)
- Riverton, Illinois
- Riverton, Indiana
- Riverton, Iowa
- Riverton, Kansas
- Riverton, Kentucky
- Riverton, a neighborhood in Portland, Maine
- Riverton, Minnesota
- Riverton, Missouri
- Riverton, Nebraska
- Riverton, New Jersey
- Riverton, New York
- Riverton Houses, a residential development in New York City
- Riverton, Oregon
- Riverton, Utah
- Riverton, Washington
- Riverton, West Virginia
- Riverton, Wyoming

Riverton may also refer to:

- Riverton Prize, a Norwegian crime fiction award

== See also ==
- Mia Riverton
- Rivertown (disambiguation)
- Town River
