= Luxomni, Georgia =

Unincorporated community in Georgia, U.S.

Coordinates: 33.896215°N 84.116304°W

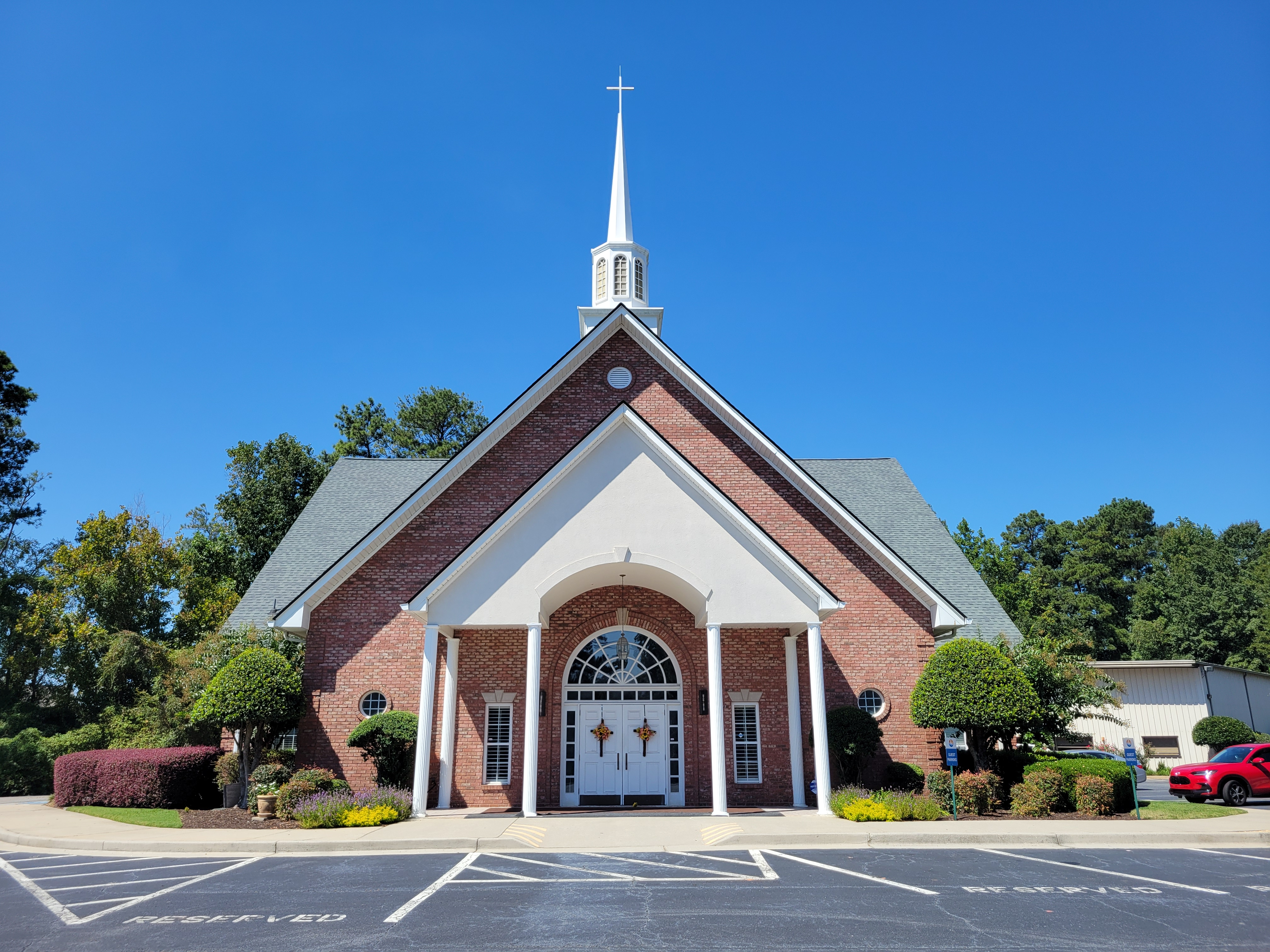
Mountain West Church Lilburn at Luxomni

Luxomni is an unincorporated community between central and southwestern Gwinnett County, Georgia, United States, a mile east-northeast of Lilburn. It was founded in 1891 around a rail depot for the Seaboard Air Line Railroad, on the line to Lawrenceville, the county seat. The town has largely been absorbed into Lilburn and greater Gwinnett County, and is no longer part of the local vernacular.

The town's name came from the Latin, meaning "light [for] all." It was suggested by a civil engineer who worked for the railroad from a Sign of a tonic for women.

Luxomni had its own post office, a Masonic lodge, a general store, and a Baptist church. Luxomni Baptist Church, founded in 1895, is still active today.

The decaying ruins of the general store at one point could still be found standing near the corner of Luxomni Road and Arcado Road, next to the church (near the Railroad Crossing.) This has now been demolished. Just past the general store and church is an old building set back in a wooded area with a faded sign reading "Luxomni Sewing Club."

The Luxomni Sewing Club was founded in 1948 by Vesta Moore. The club met in the homes of its members until 1969 when they started meeting in a building that was donated to them by Luxomni Baptist Church.

Continuing down Luxomni Road will bring you back to Lawrenceville Highway (29). Luxomni Road continues to be its primary identifier.

According to the USGS GNIS, Luxomni was centered at 33° 53' 46.37" N, 84° 6' 58.69" W.
