= Munnerlyn, Georgia =

Unincorporated community in Georgia, U.S.

Coordinates: 32°57′13″N 81°57′43″W

Munnerlyn is an unincorporated community in Burke County, in the U.S. state of Georgia.

== History ==
A post office called Munnerlyn was established in 1880, and remained in operation until 1960. It is unclear whether the community is named after Colonel John D. Munnerlyn, a local attorney, or after Charles James Munnerlyn, a Georgia politician. Early variant names were "Lumpkins Station", "Thomas", and "Thomas Station".
