= Quill, Georgia =

Unincorporated community in Georgia, U.S.

Coordinates: 34°38′34″N 84°18′01″W

Quill is an unincorporated community in Gilmer County, in the U.S. state of Georgia.

== History ==
A post office called Quill was established in 1904, and remained in operation until 1953. The community was named after a local Cherokee scribe.
