= Metasville, Georgia =

Unincorporated community in Georgia, US

Coordinates: 33°46′04″N 82°36′05″W

Metasville is an unincorporated community in Wilkes County, in the U.S. state of Georgia.

== History ==
The community perhaps derives its name from Metacomet, an Indian chieftain. A post office called Metasville was established in 1887, and remained in operation until 1944.

The Georgia General Assembly incorporated Metasville as a town in 1917. The town's municipal charter was repealed in 1995.
