= Pepperton, Georgia =

Unincorporated community in Georgia, U.S.

Coordinates: 33°17′36″N 83°56′42″W

Pepperton is an unincorporated community in Butts County, in the U.S. state of Georgia.

== History ==
Pepperton was named for a red pepper patch near the original town site. The Georgia General Assembly incorporated Pepperton as a town in 1897.

Much of the community was annexed by Jackson in 1966.
