= Primrose, Georgia =

Unincorporated community in Georgia, U.S.

Coordinates: 33°08′36″N 84°44′31″W

Primrose is an unincorporated community in Meriwether County, in the U.S. state of Georgia.

== History ==
The community most likely was named after the primrose flower. A post office called Primrose was established in 1907, and remained in operation until 1931.

The Georgia General Assembly incorporated Primrose as a town in 1908. The town's municipal charter was repealed in 1995.
