= Pine Park, Georgia =

Unincorporated community in Georgia, U.S.

Coordinates: 30°51′05″N 84°06′07″W

Pine Park is an unincorporated community in Grady County, in the U.S. state of Georgia.

== History ==
Pine Park had its start when the Atlantic Coast Line Railway was extended to that point. The Georgia General Assembly incorporated Pine Park as a town in 1910. A post office called Pine Park was established in 1902, and remained in operation until 1954.
