= Portland, Georgia =

Unincorporated community in Georgia, U.S.

Coordinates: 34°03′26″N 85°02′11″W

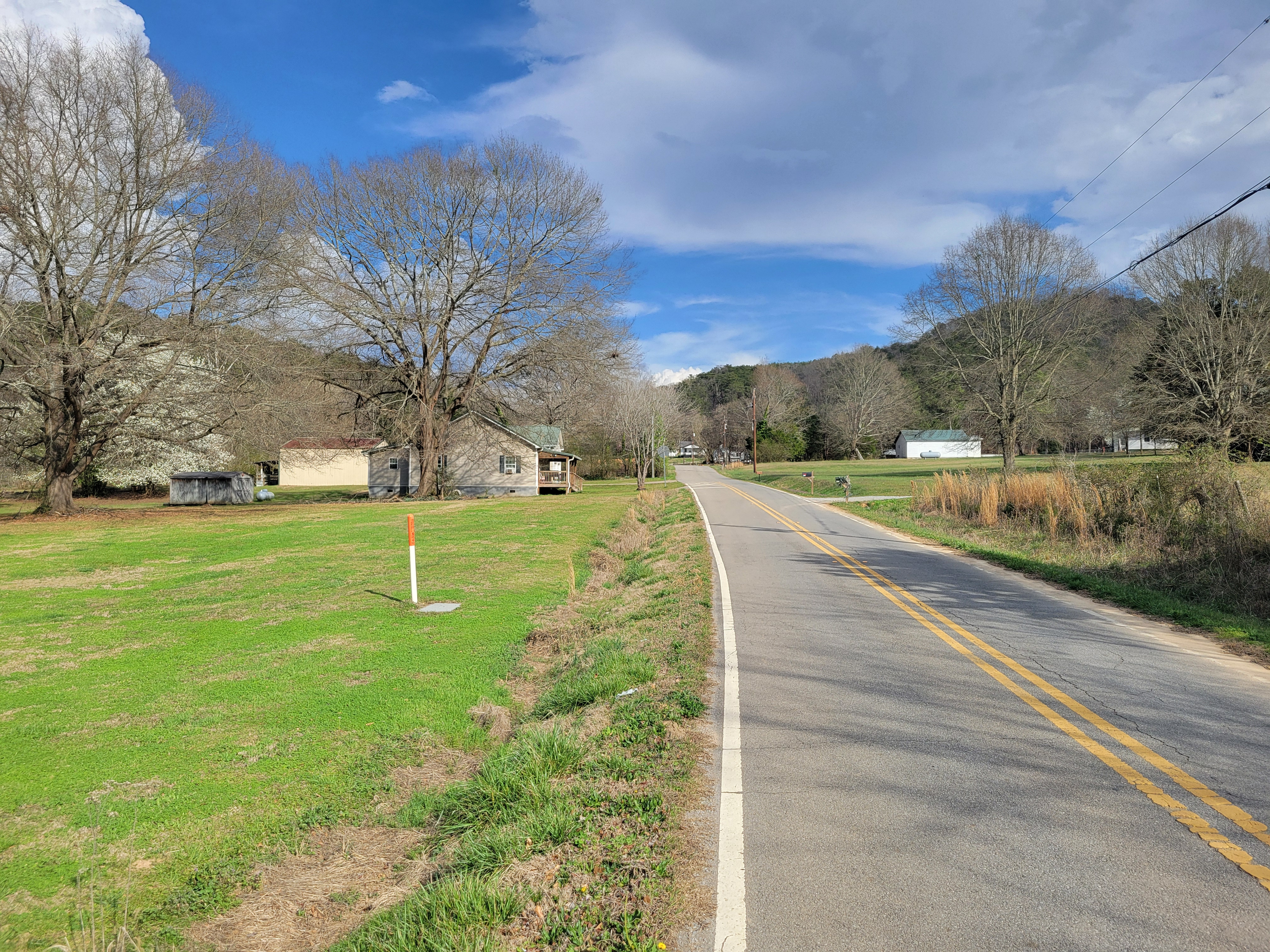
Portland Road

Portland is an unincorporated community in Polk County, in the U.S. state of Georgia.

== History ==
A post office called Portland was established in 1911, and remained in operation until it was discontinued in 1929. The community was named after the local Southern States Portland Cement Company, a manufacturer of Portland cement.
