= Kenwood, Fayette County, Georgia =

Unincorporated community in Georgia, U.S.

Coordinates: 33°30′41″N 84°26′10″W

Kenwood is an unincorporated community in northeastern Fayette County, Georgia. It uses the address of nearby Fayetteville, Georgia.

== Nearby communities ==
The nearby communities are Fayetteville, Peachtree City and Tyrone, Georgia.
