= Irwins Crossroads, Georgia =

Unincorporated community in Georgia, U.S.

Coordinates: 32°51′27″N 82°50′58″W

Irwins Crossroads is an unincorporated community in Washington County, in the U.S. state of Georgia.

== History ==
The community was named after the local Irwin family of pioneer citizens. Variant names were "Irwin Crossroads" and "Irwins". A post office called Irwin's Cross Roads was established in 1842, and remained in operation until 1873.
