= Rose Hill Heights =

Coordinates: 32°29′50″N 84°58′10″W

- Neighborhood
- Interactive map of Rose Hill Heights

Area
  - Total: 0.600 sq mi (1.55 km^{2})

Population (2007)
  - Total: 2,199
- Time zone: UTC-5 (EST)
  - Summer (DST): UTC-4 (EDT)

Rose Hill Heights is a neighborhood east of the central business district of Downtown Columbus, Georgia, United States. The boundaries are generally acknowledged to be 20th Street the north, Warm Springs Road to the south, Woodruff Road to the west and Hamilton Road to the east.
