= Jolly, Georgia =

Georgia unincorporated community

Coordinates: 33°07′20″N 84°23′24″W

Jolly is an unincorporated community in Pike County, in the U.S. state of Georgia.

== History ==
A post office called Jolly was established in 1887, and remained in operation until 1910. The community was so named for the "jolly" demeanor of its original inhabitants. A variant name is "Travelers Rest".
