= Mount Pleasant, Wayne County, Georgia =

Unincorporated community in Georgia, USA

Coordinates: 31°26′03″N 81°40′45″W

Mount Pleasant is an unincorporated community in Wayne County, in the U.S. state of Georgia.

== History ==
A post office called Mount Pleasant was established in 1855, and remained in operation until 1948. Despite its commendatory name, Mount Pleasant is situated in a flat area.
