= McGregor, Georgia =

Unincorporated community in Georgia, U.S.

Coordinates: 32°11′48″N 82°30′17″W

McGregor is an unincorporated community in Montgomery County, in the U.S. state of Georgia.

== History ==
A post office called McGregor was established in 1890, and remained in operation until 1953. The community was named after Alexander McGregor, the original owner of the town site.
