= Lorane, Georgia =

Unincorporated community in Georgia, U.S.

Coordinates: 32°54′50″N 83°46′27″W

Lorane is an unincorporated community in Bibb County, in the U.S. state of Georgia.

== History ==
A post office called Lorane was established in 1885, and remained in operation until 1940. The community's original name was "Lorraine"; a railroad error accounts for the error in spelling, which was never corrected.
