= Mundys Mill, Georgia =

Unincorporated community in Georgia, U.S.

Coordinates: 33°29′24″N 84°23′22″W

Mundy's Mill is an unincorporated community in Clayton County, in the U.S. state of Georgia.

== History ==
The community was named after E. T. and R. W. Mundy, proprietors of a local gristmill, with the same name. Mundy's Mill, one of the oldest landmarks in the community, was built in 1890 by Andrew Jackson Mundy and Erasamus Tomlin Mundy. The mill produced corn and wheat for the surrounding community for more than six generations. In 1986, the mill was destroyed during a fire caused by arson. One of the only remaining pieces of the mill, a waterwheel, is on display at Mundy's Mill High School.

== Education ==
The Clayton County School District covers the entire county.

Mundy's Mill Middle School and Mundy's Mill High School are operated by the district.
