= Noah, Georgia =

Unincorporated community in Georgia, United States

Coordinates: 33°12′56″N 82°17′09″W

Noah is an unincorporated community in Jefferson County, in the U.S. state of Georgia.

== History ==
A post office called Noah was established in 1885, and remained in operation until 1908. The community was named after Noah, a character in the Hebrew Bible.
