= Merrillville, Georgia =

Unincorporated community in Georgia, U.S.

Coordinates: 30°56′57″N 83°52′48″W

Merrillville is an unincorporated community in Thomas County, in the U.S. state of Georgia.

== History ==
A post office called Merrillville was established in 1900, and remained in operation until 1933. The Georgia General Assembly incorporated Merrillville as a town in 1902.
