= Madras, Georgia =

Unincorporated community in Georgia, U.S.

Coordinates: 33°26′24″N 84°44′32″W

Madras is an unincorporated community in Coweta County, in the U.S. state of Georgia.

== History ==
The railroad was extended to the site in 1849. Early variant names were Powell's Station, Powellton, Powellton Station and Powellville. This original name honored one Mr. Powell, a first settler. In 1902, the current name, Madras, was adopted. A post office called Powellville was established in 1871, and the post office's name was changed to Madras in 1902.

The Georgia General Assembly incorporated the place in 1893 as the "Town of Powellville".
