= Rockville, Georgia =

Unincorporated community in Putnam County, Georgia, United States

Coordinates: 33°19′39″N 83°13′08″W

Rockville is an unincorporated community in Putnam County, in the U.S. state of Georgia. It lies about 12 miles east of Eatonton.

== History ==
A post office called Rockville was established in 1826, and remained in operation until 1907.
