= Poplar Springs, Georgia =

Unincorporated community in the state of Georgia

Coordinates: 34°54′15″N 85°08′19″W

Poplar Springs is an unincorporated community in Catoosa County, in the U.S. state of Georgia.

== Etymology ==
This community took its name from Poplar Spring.
