= Paramore Hill, Georgia =

Unincorporated community in Georgia, U.S.

Coordinates: 32°45′31″N 81°53′16″W

Paramore Hill is an unincorporated community in Jenkins County, in the U.S. state of Georgia.

== History ==
Paramore was the name of an early settler. A variant name was "Paramore". A post office called Parramore Hill was established in 1868, the name was changed to Parramore in 1881, and the post office closed in 1900.
