= Lee Pope, Georgia =

Unincorporated community in Georgia, US

Coordinates: 32°36′44″N 83°57′21″W

Lee Pope is an unincorporated community in Crawford County, in the U.S. state of Georgia.

== History ==
A post office called Lee Pope was established in 1889, and remained in operation until 1951. The community was named after the local Lee and Pope families, early settlers.
