= Rio, Georgia =

Unincorporated community in Georgia, U.S.

Coordinates: 33°16′48″N 84°22′55″W

Rio is an unincorporated community in Spalding County, in the U.S. state of Georgia. It is right by the Griffin Reservoir, and also has a Fire Department station. Rio is derived from Spanish, meaning "river".
