= Loco, Georgia =

Unincorporated community in Georgia, U.S.

Coordinates: 33°43′21.46″N 82°28′38.46″W

Loco is an unincorporated community in Lincoln County, in the U.S. state of Georgia.

== History ==
The name "Loco" most likely is derived from the Chickasaw language. A post office called Loco was established in 1890, and remained in operation until 1942.

Loco has a Baptist church, which was established in 1895. The GNIS also lists the name as "Loce".
