= Lytle, Georgia =

Unincorporated community in Georgia, U.S.

Coordinates: 34°54′59″N 85°16′30″W

Lytle is an unincorporated community in Walker County, in the U.S. state of Georgia.

== History ==
A post office called Lytle was in operation from 1890 until 1910. The community's name may honor William Haines Lytle, a Union officer killed in Georgia in the American Civil War.

The Georgia General Assembly incorporated Lytle as a town in 1917; the town's municipal charter was repealed in 1995 along with those of many other inactive Georgia municipalities.
