= Lifsey, Georgia =

Unincorporated community in Georgia, U.S.

Coordinates: 33°02′12″N 84°22′24″W

Lifsey is an unincorporated community in Pike County, Georgia, United States.

== History ==
The community was named after its founder, James Samuel "Tony" Lifsey. Variant names include "Lifsey Springs" and "Lifseys Store". A post office called Lifsey's Store was established in 1878, the name was shortened to Lifsey in 1891, and the post office closed in 1907.
