= Raytown, Georgia =

Unincorporated community in Georgia, U.S.

Coordinates: 33°34′09″N 82°45′09″W

Raytown is an unincorporated community in Taliaferro County, in the U.S. state of Georgia.

== History ==
The community was named after the Ray family. A variant name was "Ray's Place". A post office called Raytown was established in 1835, and remained in operation until 1867.
