= Philema Branch =

Stream in Georgia, U.S.

Coordinates: 31°44′4.62″N 84°0′51.66″W

Philema Branch (sometimes called Philema Creek) is a stream in the U.S. state of Georgia. It is a tributary to Flint River.

The stream was named after Chief Fullemy (or Philema) of the Chiaha tribe. A variant name is Beaverdam Creek.
