= Ripley, Georgia =

Unincorporated community in Georgia, US

Coordinates: 32°43′31″N 83°25′02″W

Ripley is an unincorporated community in Twiggs County, in the U.S. state of Georgia.

== History ==
A post office called Ripley was established in 1892, and remained in operation until 1921. A variant name was "Ripling".
