= Pateville, Georgia =

Unincorporated community in Georgia, U.S.

Coordinates: 31°50′10″N 83°49′26″W

Pateville is an unincorporated community in Crisp County, in the U.S. state of Georgia.

== History ==
The community was named after J. S. Pate, a pioneer citizen. A variant name is "Patesville".
