= Piscola, Georgia =

Unincorporated community in Georgia, U.S.

Coordinates: 30°41′25″N 83°40′34″W

Piscola is an unincorporated community in Brooks County, in the U.S. state of Georgia.

== History ==
The community takes its name from nearby Piscola Creek.
