= Patten, Georgia =

Unincorporated community in Georgia, U.S.

Coordinates: 30°55′02″N 83°48′53″W

Patten is an unincorporated community in Thomas County, in the U.S. state of Georgia.

== History ==
A post office called Patten was established in 1884, and remained in operation until 1907. It is unknown why the name "Patten" was applied to this place.

The Georgia General Assembly incorporated Patten as a town in 1907; the town's municipal charter was repealed in 1912.
