= Palmetto, Oglethorpe County, Georgia =

Unincorporated community in Georgia, U.S.

Palmetto
- Unincorporated community
- Interactive map of Palmetto
- Location within the state of Georgia
- Coordinates: 33°54′21″N 82°55′24″W
- Country: United States
- State: Georgia
- County: Oglethorpe
- Named for: Areal presence of dwarf palmetto

Population
  - Estimate (2022): 780
- Time zone: UTC-5 (EST)
  - Summer (DST): UTC-4 (EDT)
- ZIP Code: 30667
- Area codes: 706, 762

Palmetto is an unincorporated community in Oglethorpe County, in the U.S. state of Georgia.

In 2022, the population estimate was 780.

The community was named for the presence of dwarf palmetto in the vicinity. The plant grows in abundance along the county's streams.

The ZIP Code for Palmetto is 30667.
