= Percale, Georgia =

Unincorporated community in Georgia, U.S.

Coordinates: 33°05′22″N 83°47′43″W

Percale is an unincorporated community in Monroe County, in the U.S. state of Georgia.

== History ==
The community was named for a percale linens factory at the site.
