= Mallorysville, Georgia =

Unincorporated community in Georgia, U.S.

Coordinates: 33°53′42″N 82°46′28″W

Mallorysville is an unincorporated community in Wilkes County, in the U.S. state of Georgia.

== History ==
Mallorysville was named after William Mallory, a county official. The Mallorysville post office closed in 1903.

The Georgia General Assembly incorporated Mallorysville as a town in 1819. The town's municipal charter was repealed in 1995.
