= WPPT (AM) =

Radio station in Talladega, Alabama, United States (1945–2012)

Talladega, Alabama; United States
- Broadcast area: Talladega, Alabama
- Frequency: 1230 kHz

Ownership
- Owner: Birmingham Christian Radio, Inc.

History
- First air date: 1945 (as WHTB)
- Last air date: April 6, 2012
- Former call signs: WHTB (1945–1959); WNUZ (1959–2012); WPPT (2012)

Technical information
- Facility ID: 54472
- Class: C
- Power: 1,000 watts (unlimited)
- Transmitter coordinates: 33°25′16.4″N 86°7′12.9″W

WPPT (1230 AM) was an American radio station formerly licensed to serve the community of Talladega, Alabama. The station, established in 1945, was last owned by Birmingham Christian Radio, Inc.

== Programming ==
WPPT broadcast a gospel music format to the Anniston, Alabama, area. The station aired a mix of local and syndicated programming.

== History ==
=== WHTB era ===
This station first signed on in 1945 as WHTB, broadcasting with 250 watts of power at 1230 kHz under the ownership of Voice of Talladega, Inc. That company, 80% owned by the Talladega Publishing Company which published the Talladega Daily Home and the weekly Talladega News, signed on WHTB-FM as a sister station in 1953.

=== WNUZ era ===
WHTB was sold to Radio Alabama, Inc., on June 1, 1959. The new owners had the call letters changed to WNUZ shortly after they acquired the station. In 1968, the station upgraded its daytime signal to 1,000 watts.

After more than 37 years of continuous ownership, Radio Alabama, Inc., reached an agreement in March 1997 to sell this station to Birmingham Christian Radio, Inc. The deal was approved by the FCC on May 13, 1997, and the transaction was consummated on September 10, 1997.

=== Falling silent ===
Beginning in October 2005, WNUZ began experiencing a series of technical issues that kept the station from broadcasting for months at a time in 2005 and 2006. The station fell silent again in July 2007 and stayed off the air for more than six months due to new technical issues with the transmitter.

On August 22, 2008, WNUZ "suffered direct lightning strikes" during Tropical Storm Fay which resulted in "the complete destruction of the station's transmitter" and caused unspecified damage to other electrical broadcast equipment at the station. The station applied to the FCC for authority to stay silent while their engineers repaired or replaced the damaged gear and evaluated the station's other equipment. On December 24, 2008, WNUZ was granted permission to remain off the air until no later than June 22, 2009. The station resumed normal broadcast operations on August 19, 2009.

=== WPPT era ===
On March 5, 2012, the station's call sign was changed to WPPT. On April 6, 2012, the FCC cancelled WPPT's license, because the station did not apply for renewal.
