= Poplar Spring =

Coordinates: 34°53′42.28″N 85°10′22.83″W

Poplar Spring is a spring in Catoosa County, Georgia, United States.

Poplar Spring was named for a single poplar tree which stood above this spring.
