= Rivertown, Georgia =

Unincorporated community in Georgia, U.S.

Coordinates: 33°36′56″N 84°44′15″W

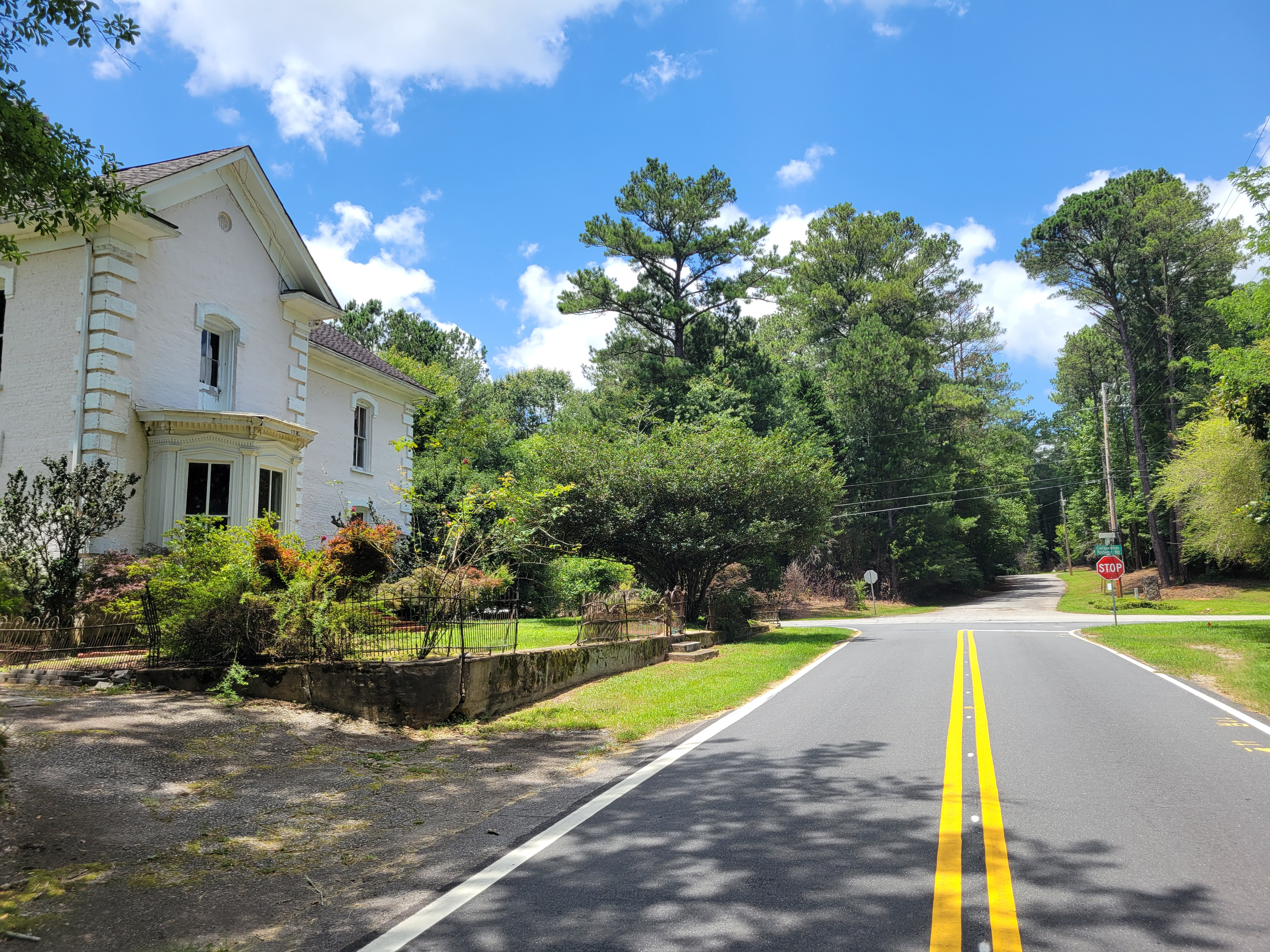
House along North Rivertown Road

Rivertown is an unincorporated community in Fulton County, in the U.S. state of Georgia.

== History ==
The community was named for its riverside setting on the Chattahoochee River.
