= Pike County, Georgia =

County in Georgia, United States

- County
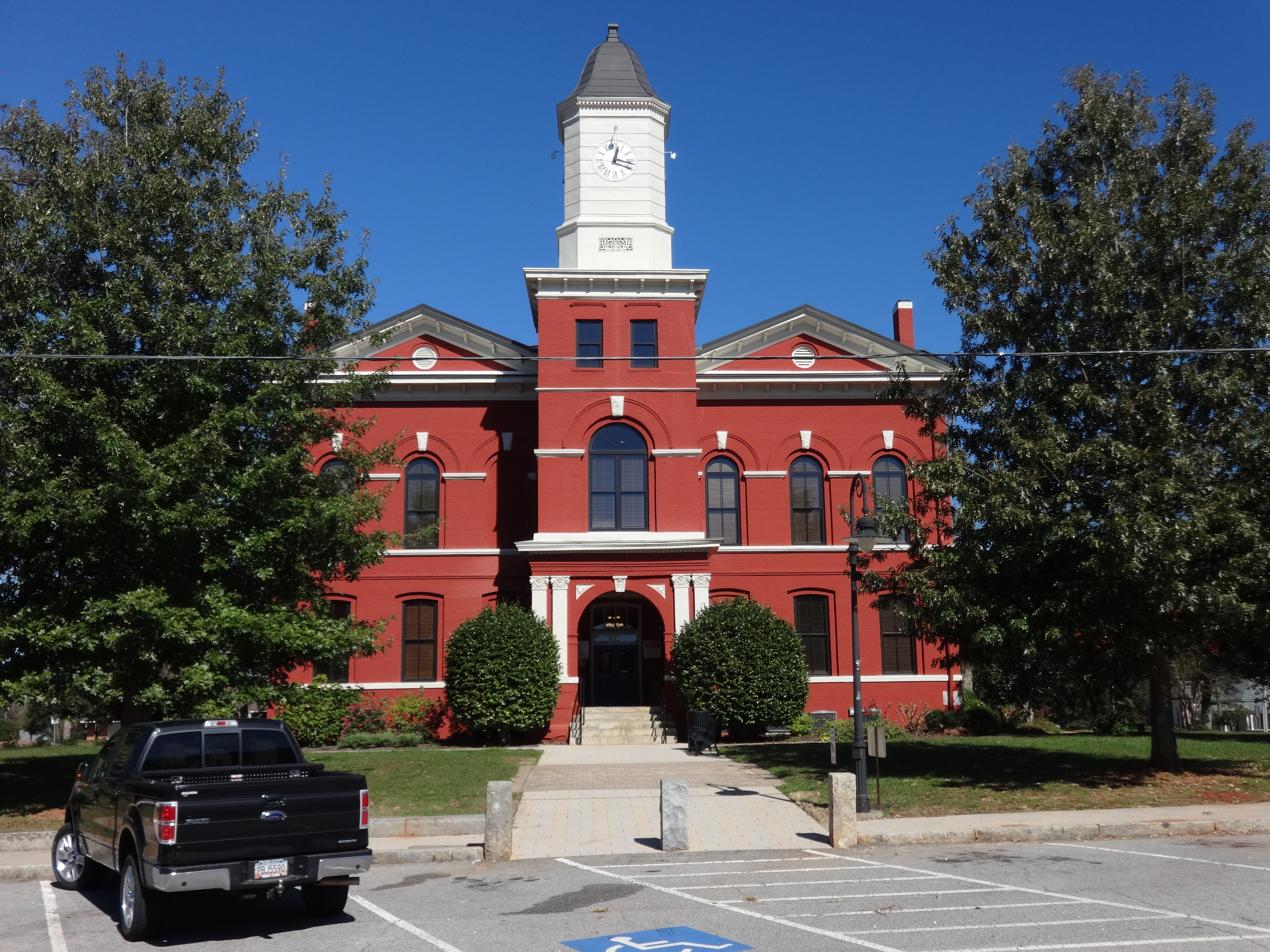
- Pike County Courthouse (built 1895), Zebulon

- Location within the U.S. state of Georgia
- Coordinates: 33°05′N 84°23′W
- Country: United States
- State: Georgia
- Founded: 1822; 204 years ago
- Named for: Zebulon Pike
- Seat: Zebulon
- Largest city: Zebulon

Area
  - Total: 219 sq mi (570 km^{2})
  - Land: 216 sq mi (560 km^{2})
  - Water: 3.3 sq mi (8.5 km^{2})

Population (2020)
  - Total: 18,889
  - Estimate (2025): 20,932 ▲
  - Density: 87/sq mi (34/km^{2})
- Time zone: UTC−5 (Eastern)
  - Summer (DST): UTC−4 (EDT)
- Congressional district: 3rd
- Website: www.pikecoga.com

Pike County is a county in the West Central region of the U.S. state of Georgia. As of the 2020 census, the population was 18,889. The county seat is Zebulon.

== History ==
Pike County was made from part of Monroe County in 1822. It was named after Zebulon Montgomery Pike, an explorer and army officer.

== Geography ==
According to the U.S. Census Bureau, the county has a total area of 219 square miles (570 km^{2}), of which 216 square miles (560 km^{2}) is land and 3.3 square miles (8.5 km^{2}) (1.5%) is water. The entirety of Pike County is located in the Upper Flint River sub-basin of the ACF River Basin (Apalachicola-Chattahoochee-Flint River Basin). The county is located in the Piedmont region of the state.

=== Major highways ===
- U.S. Route 19 / State Route 3
- U.S. Route 41 / State Route 7
- State Route 18
- State Route 74
- State Route 109
- State Route 362

=== Adjacent counties ===
- Spalding County (north)
- Lamar County (east)
- Upson County (south)
- Meriwether County (west)

== Communities ==
=== Cities ===
- Concord
- Meansville
- Molena
- Williamson
- Zebulon (county seat)

=== Census-designated place ===
- Hilltop

=== Unincorporated communities ===
- Jolly
- Lifsey
- Hollonville

== Demographics ==
Historical population
Census	Pop.	Note	%±
1830	6,149		—
1840	9,176		49.2%
1850	14,306		55.9%
1860	10,078		−29.6%
1870	10,905		8.2%
1880	15,849		45.3%
1890	16,300		2.8%
1900	18,761		15.1%
1910	19,495		3.9%
1920	21,212		8.8%
1930	10,853		−48.8%
1940	10,375		−4.4%
1950	8,459		−18.5%
1960	7,138		−15.6%
1970	7,316		2.5%
1980	8,937		22.2%
1990	10,224		14.4%
2000	13,688		33.9%
2010	17,869		30.5%
2020	18,889		5.7%
2025 (est.)	20,932	▲	10.8%
U.S. Decennial Census; 1790-1880 1890-1910; 1920-1930 1930-1940; 1940-1950 1960-1980; 1980-2000 2010

=== Racial and ethnic composition ===
Pike County, Georgia – Racial and ethnic composition Note: the US Census treats Hispanic/Latino as an ethnic category. This table excludes Latinos from the racial categories and assigns them to a separate category. Hispanics/Latinos may be of any race.
Race / Ethnicity (NH = Non-Hispanic)	Pop 1980	Pop 1990	Pop 2000	Pop 2010	Pop 2020	% 1980	% 1990	% 2000	% 2010	% 2020
White alone (NH)	6,522	8,095	11,350	15,506	16,313	72.98%	79.18%	82.92%	86.78%	86.36%
Black or African American alone (NH)	2,257	2,042	2,019	1,825	1,445	25.25%	19.97%	14.75%	10.21%	7.65%
Native American or Alaska Native alone (NH)	14	11	29	52	28	0.16%	0.11%	0.21%	0.29%	0.15%
Asian alone (NH)	13	21	51	55	77	0.15%	0.21%	0.37%	0.31%	0.41%
Native Hawaiian or Pacific Islander alone (NH)	x	x	0	1	0	x	x	0.00%	0.01%	0.00%
Other race alone (NH)	0	1	3	15	62	0.00%	0.01%	0.02%	0.08%	0.33%
Mixed race or Multiracial (NH)	x	x	69	222	616	x	x	0.50%	1.24%	3.26%
Hispanic or Latino (any race)	131	54	167	193	348	1.47%	0.53%	1.22%	1.08%	1.84%
Total	8,937	10,224	13,688	17,869	18,889	100.00%	100.00%	100.00%	100.00%	100.00%

=== 2020 census ===
As of the 2020 census, the county had a population of 18,889, 6,630 households, and 4,525 families residing in the county.

The racial makeup of the county was 87.0% White, 7.7% Black or African American, 0.2% American Indian and Alaska Native, 0.4% Asian, 0.0% Native Hawaiian and Pacific Islander, 0.7% from some other race, and 4.0% from two or more races. Hispanic or Latino residents of any race comprised 1.8% of the population.

The median age was 40.6 years, with 24.1% of residents under the age of 18 and 16.1% aged 65 or older; for every 100 females there were 96.7 males, and for every 100 females age 18 and over there were 93.9 males age 18 and over.

Only 0.3% of residents lived in urban areas, while 99.7% lived in rural areas.

There were 6,630 households in the county, of which 37.0% had children under the age of 18 living with them and 20.0% had a female householder with no spouse or partner present. About 18.9% of all households were made up of individuals and 9.3% had someone living alone who was 65 years of age or older.

There were 7,066 housing units, of which 6.2% were vacant. Among occupied housing units, 81.9% were owner-occupied and 18.1% were renter-occupied. The homeowner vacancy rate was 1.1% and the rental vacancy rate was 6.7%.

== Education ==
Georgia Military College has an extension campus near Zebulon City Hall.

The Pike County School District serves Pike County. The school district has one Pre-K building (lottery funded), one primary school (K-2), one elementary school (3–5), one middle school (6–8), a ninth grade academy and one high school(10-12). Shane Williamson is the Superintendent of Schools. They also have a private school system named Crosspoint Christian academy.

== Politics ==
As of the 2020s, Pike County is a strongly Republican voting county, voting 86.57% for Donald Trump in 2024. For elections to the United States House of Representatives, Pike County is part of Georgia's 3rd congressional district, currently represented by Brian Jack. For elections to the Georgia State Senate, Pike County is part of District 16. For elections to the Georgia House of Representatives, Pike County is part of district District 123.

United States presidential election results for Pike County, Georgia
Year	Republican		Democratic		Third party(ies)	
Year	No.	%	No.	%	No.	%
1912	34	3.70%	753	81.85%	133	14.46%
1916	65	6.94%	766	81.75%	106	11.31%
1920	280	17.98%	1,277	82.02%	0	0.00%
1924	41	4.07%	895	88.79%	72	7.14%
1928	238	25.00%	714	75.00%	0	0.00%
1932	33	3.10%	1,021	95.96%	10	0.94%
1936	149	14.03%	910	85.69%	3	0.28%
1940	209	20.13%	829	79.87%	0	0.00%
1944	133	15.20%	742	84.80%	0	0.00%
1948	72	15.25%	256	54.24%	144	30.51%
1952	286	18.64%	1,248	81.36%	0	0.00%
1956	210	16.44%	1,067	83.56%	0	0.00%
1960	255	19.88%	1,028	80.12%	0	0.00%
1964	1,064	52.94%	946	47.06%	0	0.00%
1968	345	14.26%	632	26.13%	1,442	59.61%
1972	1,432	77.20%	423	22.80%	0	0.00%
1976	776	28.97%	1,903	71.03%	0	0.00%
1980	1,271	41.08%	1,755	56.72%	68	2.20%
1984	1,855	60.66%	1,203	39.34%	0	0.00%
1988	2,074	63.35%	1,176	35.92%	24	0.73%
1992	1,822	44.40%	1,651	40.23%	631	15.38%
1996	2,054	52.52%	1,474	37.69%	383	9.79%
2000	3,358	68.74%	1,413	28.93%	114	2.33%
2004	5,193	76.94%	1,506	22.31%	50	0.74%
2008	6,547	79.64%	1,575	19.16%	99	1.20%
2012	6,668	81.93%	1,356	16.66%	115	1.41%
2016	7,278	83.03%	1,240	14.15%	248	2.83%
2020	9,127	85.13%	1,505	14.04%	89	0.83%
2024	10,864	86.57%	1,648	13.13%	37	0.29%

United States Senate election results for Pike County, Georgia2
Year	Republican		Democratic		Third party(ies)	
Year	No.	%	No.	%	No.	%
2020	9,045	84.94%	1,430	13.43%	174	1.63%
2020	8,266	85.76%	1,372	14.24%	0	0.00%

United States Senate election results for Pike County, Georgia3
Year	Republican		Democratic		Third party(ies)	
Year	No.	%	No.	%	No.	%
2020	4,965	46.94%	1,118	10.57%	4,495	42.49%
2020	8,241	85.56%	1,391	14.44%	0	0.00%
2022	7,948	84.59%	1,257	13.38%	191	2.03%
2022	7,458	86.29%	1,185	13.71%	0	0.00%

Georgia Gubernatorial election results for Pike County
Year	Republican		Democratic		Third party(ies)	
Year	No.	%	No.	%	No.	%
2022	8,303	88.04%	1,075	11.40%	53	0.56%

== See also ==
- National Register of Historic Places listings in Pike County, Georgia
- List of counties in Georgia
- James Eppinger, judge of the county court for 28 years
