= Parkertown, Georgia =

Unincorporated community in Georgia, U.S.

Coordinates: 34°27′27″N 83°02′24″W

Parkertown is an unincorporated community in Hart County, in the U.S. state of Georgia.

== History ==
Parkertown was established in 1832, and named after Joseph A. Parker, a pioneer citizen. Variant names were "Parker" and "Parkers Store". A post office called Parker's Store was established in 1837, and remained in operation until 1906.

A gristmill once stood near the town site on Big Shoal Creek.
