= Ocee, Georgia =

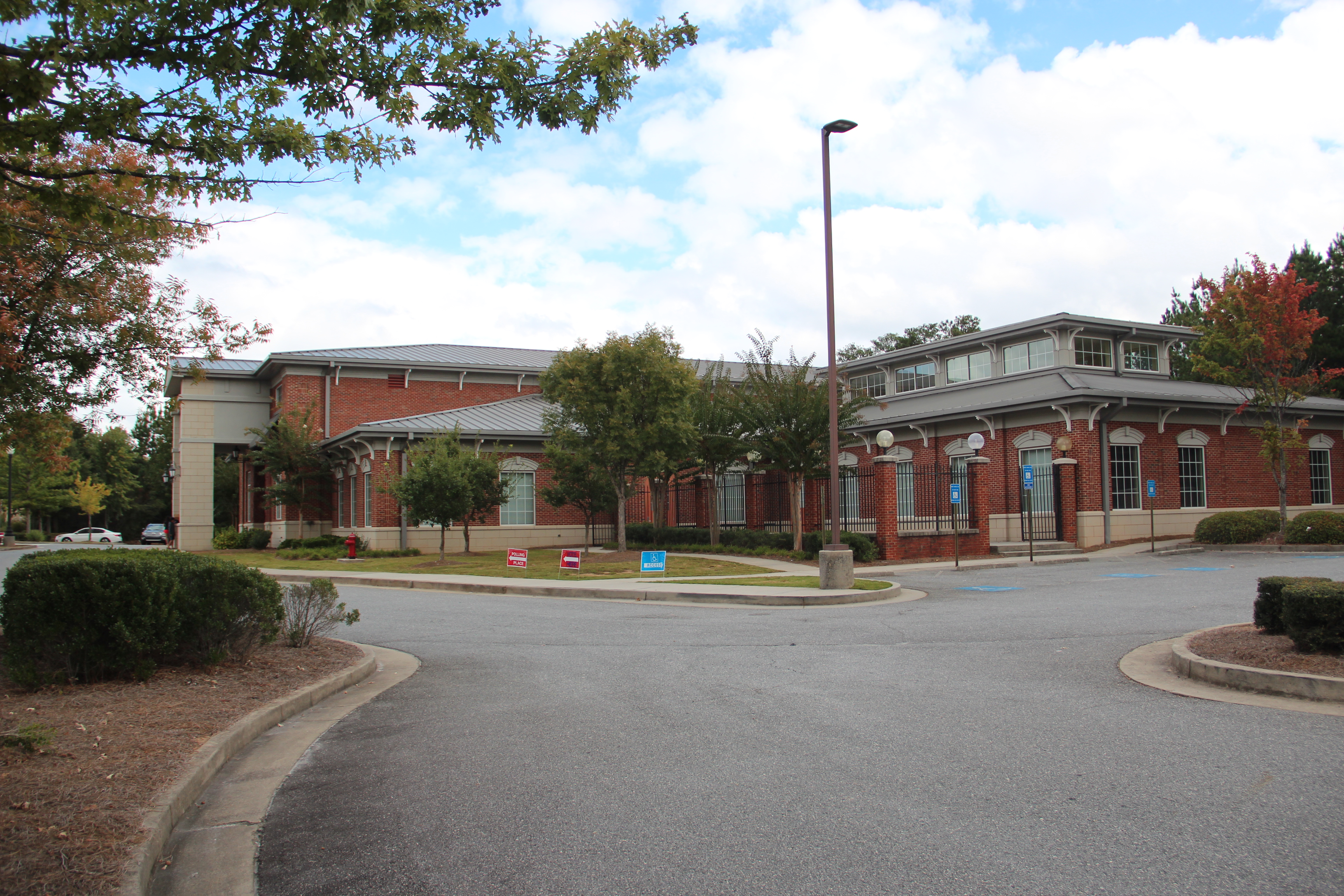
Dr. Robert E. Fulton Regional Library in Ocee

Ocee was a small community in Milton County, now located in Johns Creek in Fulton County, Georgia. It was centered at 34°03′52″N 84°12′46″W.

It was originally called New York, then Mazeppa. The Ocee name, which was taken from the name of a Cherokee community in the area, is still in use today for a school, a park, a library and a church, among others. Ocee is now a part of the new city of Johns Creek, named after Johns Creek which flows just east of it. That city is a part of the municipalization of northern Fulton.
