= Rabbit Hill, Georgia =

Unincorporated community in Georgia, U.S.

Coordinates: 31°54′23″N 81°16′09″W

Rabbit Hill is an unincorporated community in Bryan County, in the U.S. state of Georgia.

== History ==
According to tradition, the community was named from the habit of local residents of eating rabbit meat.
