= National Register of Historic Places listings in Hancock County, Georgia =

This is a list of properties and districts in Hancock County, Georgia that are listed on the National Register of Historic Places (NRHP).

This National Park Service list is complete through NPS recent listings posted March 21, 2025.

== Current listings ==
	Name on the Register	Image	Date listed	Location	City or town	Description
1	Camilla-Zack Community Center District		December 2, 1974 (#74000685)	Rte. 1; 33°24′41″N 82°56′29″W	Mayfield vic.	(article in draft--doncram)
2	Cheely-Coleman House	Cheely-Coleman House	October 29, 1976 (#76000638)	S of Jewell off GA 123 at Ogeechee River; 33°15′07″N 82°45′35″W	Jewell	
3	Glen Mary		May 8, 1974 (#74000687)	Linton Rd., S of Sparta; 33°10′40″N 83°00′06″W	Sparta	
4	Hurt-Rives Plantation		August 8, 1996 (#96000874)	Off Rives Rd., northwest of Sparta; 33°18′34″N 83°07′08″W	Sparta	
5	John S. Jackson Plantation House and Outbuildings		June 28, 1984 (#84001116)	Off GA 16; 33°24′17″N 83°05′18″W	White Plains	
6	Jewell Historic District	Jewell Historic District	May 14, 1979 (#79003106)	GA 248 and GA 16; 33°17′41″N 82°46′58″W	Jewell	
7	Linton Historic District	Linton Historic District	June 18, 1975 (#75000597)	Town of Linton and its environs 33°06′52″N 82°58′58″W	Linton	
8	Pearson-Boyer Plantation		April 12, 1993 (#93000236)	Pearson Chapel Rd. 33°11′06″N 83°01′00″W	Sparta	
9	Rockby		July 12, 1978 (#78000988)	NE of Sparta off GA 16; 33°18′11″N 82°56′26″W	Sparta	
10	Shivers-Simpson House		June 22, 1970 (#70000207)	N of Jewell on Mayfield Rd. 33°18′30″N 82°47′30″W	Jewell	
11	Sparta Cemetery	Sparta Cemetery	June 22, 2001 (#01000647)	N of jct. of Hamilton and Boland Sts. 33°16′43″N 82°58′26″W	Sparta	
12	Sparta Historic District	Sparta Historic District	April 16, 1974 (#74000686)	Roughly bounded by Hamilton, Elm, W, and Burwell Sts. 33°16′36″N 82°58′36″W	Sparta	The old courthouse is a contributing property that is in peril, see Georgia Trust. Includes the Rossiter-Little House
