= Hancock County School District (Georgia) =

School district in Georgia (U.S. state)

Address
- 10571 Hwy 15 North Sparta, Georgia, 31087; United States
- Coordinates: 33.281991°N 82.962861°W

District information
- Grades: Pre-school - 12
- Superintendent: Anton Anthony
- Accreditations: Southern Association of Colleges and Schools; Georgia Accrediting Commission

Students and staff
- Enrollment: 671
- Faculty: 83

Other information
- Telephone: (706) 444-5775
- Fax: (706) 444-7026
- Website: www.hancock.k12.ga.us

The Hancock County School District is a public school district in Hancock County, Georgia, United States, based in Sparta. It serves the communities of Culverton, Mayfield and Sparta.

== Schools ==
The Hancock County School District has one elementary school, one middle school, and one high school.

=== Elementary school ===
- Lewis Elementary School

=== Middle school ===
- Hancock Central Middle School

=== High school ===
- Hancock Central High School
