= Linton =

Linton may refer to:

== Places ==
=== Australia ===
- Linton, Victoria

=== Canada ===
- Linton, Ontario
- Linton, Quebec

=== United Kingdom ===
==== England ====
- Linton, Cambridgeshire
- Linton, Derbyshire
- Linton (near Bromyard), Herefordshire
- Linton (near Ross-on-Wye), Herefordshire
- Linton, Kent
- Linton, Northumberland, in Ellington and Linton civil parish
- Linton, North Yorkshire
  - Linton Falls, a waterfall on the River Wharfe
- Linton, Somerset
- Linton, West Yorkshire
- Linton-on-Ouse, and the RAF base RAF Linton-on-Ouse
- Linton Road, Oxford

==== Scotland ====
- East Linton, East Lothian
- Linton, Orkney
- Linton, Scottish Borders
- Linton Bay, island of Shapinsay
- West Linton, Scottish Borders

=== New Zealand ===
- Linton, New Zealand, a suburb of Palmerston North

=== United States ===
- Linton, Georgia
- Linton, Indiana
- Linton, Kentucky
- Linton, North Dakota
- Linton Hall, Virginia
- Linton, Wisconsin
- Linton Falls (Oregon), a waterfall in the Three Sisters Wilderness

== Other uses ==
- Linton (given name)
- Linton (surname)

== See also ==
- Linton Falls (disambiguation)
- Lynton, a town in North Devon, England
- Linnton, Portland, Oregon, a neighborhood
