= Linton (given name) =

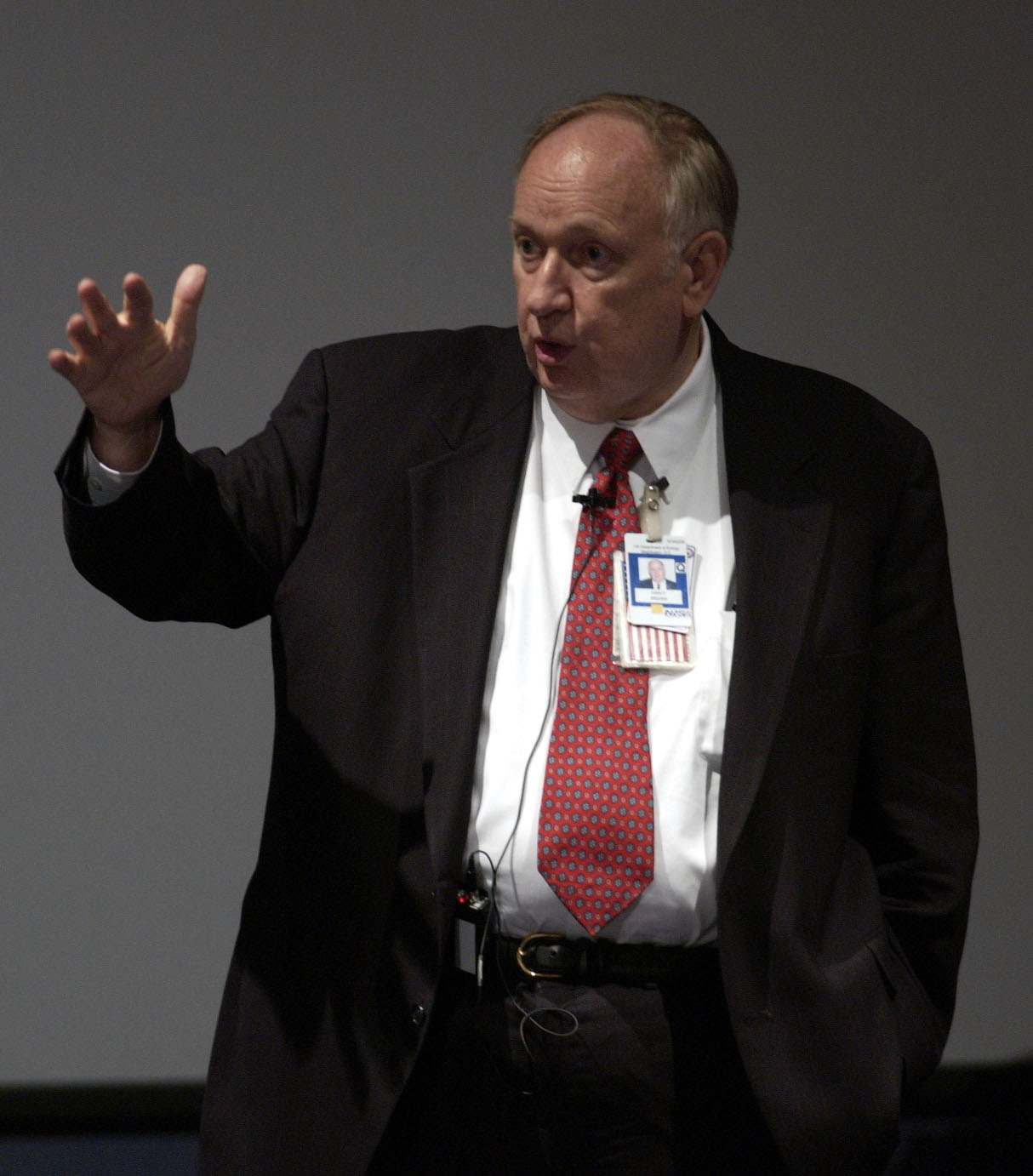
Linton Brooks, former Under Secretary of Energy for Nuclear Security

Linton is a unisex given name. Notable people with the name include:

- Linton Lomas Barrett (1904–1972), educator and translator
- Linton Besser, Australian journalist
- Linton Broaster, Belizean shooting victim
- Linton Garner (1915–2003), jazz pianist
- Linton Johnson (born 1980), professional basketball player
- Linton Kwesi Johnson (born 1952), British Jamaican dub poet
- Linton Park (artist) (1826–1906), American folk artist
- Linton Sirait (born 1956), Indonesian District Court judge
- Linton Stephens (1823–1872), associate justice of the Supreme Court of Georgia

== See also ==
- Linton (disambiguation)
