= Marion Center, Pennsylvania =

Borough in Pennsylvania, US

- Borough
- Location of Marion Center in Indiana County, Pennsylvania.

- Location within Pennsylvania Location within the United States
- Coordinates: 40°46′11″N 79°02′57″W
- Country: United States
- State: Pennsylvania
- County: Indiana
- Settled: 1841
- Incorporated: 1869

Government
  - Type: Borough Council
  - Mayor: Frank Pennington

Area
  - Total: 0.74 sq mi (1.92 km^{2})
  - Land: 0.74 sq mi (1.92 km^{2})
  - Water: 0 sq mi (0.00 km^{2})
- Elevation: 1,283 ft (391 m)

Population (2020)
  - Total: 405
  - Density: 545.0/sq mi (210.43/km^{2})
- Time zone: UTC-5 (Eastern (EST))
  - Summer (DST): UTC-4 (EDT)
- Zip code: 15759
- Area codes: 724, 878
- FIPS code: 42-47472

Marion Center is a borough in Indiana County, Pennsylvania, United States. The population was 413 at the 2020 census.

== History ==
The village was laid out by John Park in 1841 and named Marion after the Revolutionary War hero General Francis Marion. The Indiana Register first advertised lots for sale on September 1, 1841. Marion became incorporated as a borough in June 1869. The post office used a name distinct from the town (Brady Post Office) until December 26, 1890, when both were changed to Marion Center.

Map of Buffalo, Rochester, and Pittsburgh Railway, 1907. Marion Center is located in the spur to the right of Pittsburgh just south of the Indiana Junction.

In 1885, New York banker Adrien Iselin purchased the Buffalo, Rochester, and Pittsburgh Railway. A branch near the Jefferson-Indiana County Line (Indiana Junction) led south into Indiana County ending at Vintondale. The tracks from Jefferson County into Indiana County were first laid near Juneau in October 1902. Trains ran through Marion Center by April 1903. The first passenger train stopped at Marion Center on May 3, 1904. The last train, the Hoodlbug, left on June 10, 1950.

Marion Center had a vibrant community life in the late 19th and early 20th centuries. Two hotels were erected on Main Street in the 19th century. Hotel Marion, built in 1879 by Alexander Adams, had 15 rooms and was three stories tall. It burned in the 1920s. The second hotel, Mahoning House, at the corner of Main and Manor Streets, occupied the site of the former general store operated by McLaughlin, Kinter, and Company. Horatio Simons converted it to a hotel on June 1, 1904. It was torn down in the 1930s to make way for Harry Black's service station. A dentist office (operated by Dr. L. N. Park) and a pharmacy (operated by William Griffith) were located on Main Street near the store of H. P. Wetzel (located at Craig and Main Streets). By 1887, Wetzel had built a store measuring 20- by 40 feet (12 m). He later added an additional 40 feet (12 m) to the store. He was succeeded by Frank Wetzel who operated a grocery store on the site until the 1940s.

A summer normal school operated in the borough in the early 20th century. Joseph Weaver instructed students during the approximately 12-week course. Passing the superintendent's exam upon completion of the program licensed one to teach in the county's common schools. The first school in Marion Center, a log building on North Manor Street, burned in 1834. Its first teacher was William Work. A second school was built on the same site in 1848. A third building was erected in the 1860s. The North Manor Street site became home to the area's high school (1916–1929). It was torn down in the late 2000s to make way for a public park (named after famous local artist, Linton Park).

== Geography ==
Marion Center is located at 40°46′11″N 79°2′57″W (40.769782, -79.049030). Marion Center has been assigned the zip code of 15759 and is a part of area code 724.

According to the United States Census Bureau, the borough has a total area of 0.8 square miles (2.1 km^{2}), all land.

Pennsylvania Route 403 runs through the center of Marion Center, entering from the south where it becomes Manor Street at the borough line. It then turns west onto Main Street and reaches its northern terminus just west of the borough at U.S. Route 119. The two main streets of the borough run perpendicular to one another: Manor Street, north–south, and Main Street, east–west. Both streets are broken up by short, one-block alleys.

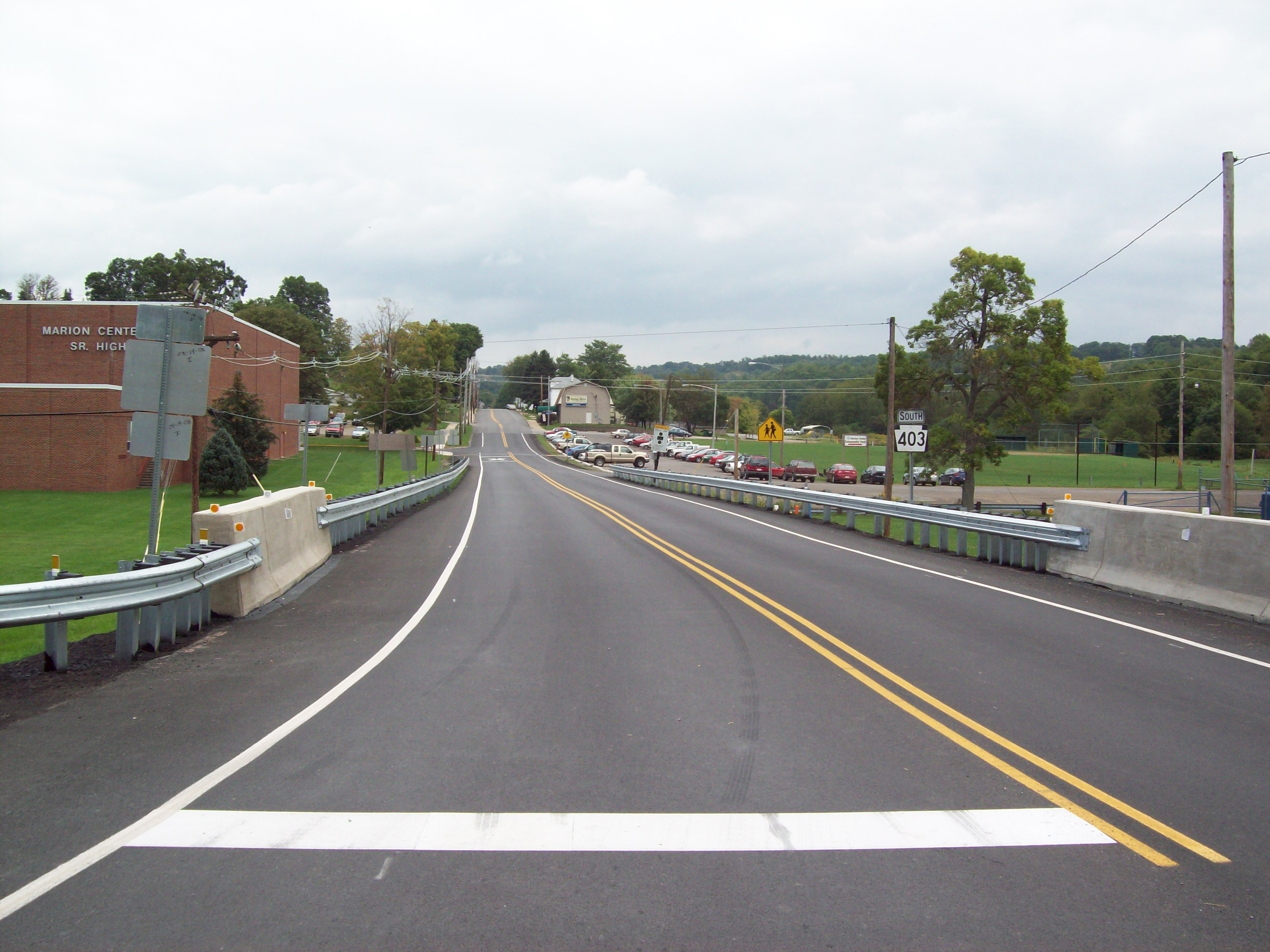
Main Street in Marion Center as viewed from US 119. Marion Center Area High School is located on the left and the East Mahoning Community Park is on the right.

Marion Center is connected to the villages of Deckers Point (via Deckers Point Road, concurrent with Main Street to the borough line), Dixonville (via South Manor Street, concurrent with PA-403 to the borough line), and Rochester Mills (via Richmond Road). Though US-119 does not pass through the borough, it connects the town to the micropolitan area of Indiana to the south and the larger borough of Punxsutawney to the north.

One unnamed tributary of Pine Run flows through the borough. It runs generally east–west and flows just south of Park Avenue, connecting to Pine Run west of the borough line and east of U.S. Highway 119. This stream has two in-flows. The first is very narrow, being small enough to easily step across, and drains the east side of the hill in the southeast section of the borough. The second drains the west side of the same hill and connects to the main flow behind the post office near its intersection with South Manor Street. All three minor water flows are perennial (though the very narrow one does dry up when rainfall is low) and have sources within the borough limits. Pine Run connects to Crooked Creek (a tributary of the Allegheny River) about five miles (8 km) south of the borough.

== Education ==
The borough is part of the Marion Center Area School District. The high school (Marion Center Area High School) and elementary school (W.A McCreery Elementary School) are located west of the borough between the borough line and U.S. Route 119. There are no institutions of higher education in the borough.

On June 21, 2002, Sam Erwin walked into the school district office with a .32-caliber pistol. One secretary was injured attempting to escape over an embankment wall outside the office building, and the assistant to the superintendent was non-fatally wounded in the right leg after being shot by the assailant in the lobby of the district office. Indiana County police said the incident concerned a dispute Erwin had with the district over his wife, Nancy Erwin (formerly Mogle), an eighth grade algebra teacher, losing her teaching position in 2001 after teaching for 21 years. Sam Erwin pleaded guilty to one count of attempted criminal homicide and one count of aggravated assault. Nancy Erwin pleaded guilty to one count of complicity to aggravated assault. As a result, she lost her teaching license.

== Industry ==
Marion Center Supply is a supplier of concrete and cement products headquartered in Marion Center.

== Finance ==
Marion Center Bank, a state-chartered bank formerly named Marion Center National Bank, opened in the summer of 1905. In 1933, Marion Center Bank earned the reputation of "the bank that did not close during the Depression" after President Franklin D. Roosevelt ordered all banks to close for a Bank Holiday on March 4. Instead of closing, Marion Center Bank pulled its screen down half-way and continued to operate.

In 1958, Marion Center Bank added a drive-thru window to its current facility. This was the first of its kind in Indiana County. A second lane was added in 1979. Marion Center Bank expanded to a second location in Clymer on December 6, 1984. Today, the bank has seven locations across Indiana, Jefferson, Armstrong, and Cambria counties: Dayton (1997), Big Run (1997), and Punxsutawney (2000). In June 2011, Marion Center Bank moved to its new headquarters in Indiana. On November 8, 2012, Marion Center Bank opened its eighth branch in Hastings, PA, its first branch in Cambria County.

Marion Center Bank's corporate headquarters is located at 1271 Indian Springs Rd in Indiana, PA.

== Demographics ==
Historical population
Census	Pop.	Note	%±
1870	310		—
1880	398		28.4%
1890	367		−7.8%
1900	294		−19.9%
1910	366		24.5%
1920	444		21.3%
1930	459		3.4%
1940	439		−4.4%
1950	433		−1.4%
1960	407		−6.0%
1970	446		9.6%
1980	494		10.8%
1990	476		−3.6%
2000	451		−5.3%
2010	451		0.0%
2020	405		−10.2%
2021 (est.)	411	▲	1.5%

As of the census of 2010, there were 451 people, 173 households, and 129 families residing in the borough. The population density was 605.3 inhabitants per square mile (233.7/km^{2}). There were 194 housing units at an average density of 256.4 per square mile (99.0/km^{2}), with 173 occupied and 21 vacant. Of the occupied units, 113 were owner-occupied, or 66.1% of the total population. The racial makeup of the borough was 98.9% White, 0.44% African American, 0.22% Asian, 0.22% American Indian and Alaska Native, and 0.22% listed as "other". There were no individuals of Hispanic descent in the borough.

There were 173 households, out of which 41% had children under the age of 18 living with them, 58.4% were married couples living together, 13.3% had a female householder with no husband present, and 24.9% were non-families. 21.4% of all households were made up of individuals, and 11.0% had someone living alone who was 65 years of age or older. The average household size was 2.61 and the average family size was 3.07.

In the borough the population was spread out, with 31.9% under the age of 19, 5.8% from 20 to 24, 14.4% from 25 to 34, 18.2% from 35 to 49, 17.9% from 50 to 64, and 11.5% who were 65 years of age or older. The median age was 37 years. Males comprised 46.3% of the population and females comprised 53.7% of the population.

The median income for a household in the borough was $27,625, and the median income for a family was $31,875. Males had a median income of $23,125 versus $20,625 for females. The per capita income for the borough was $12,048. About 15.5% of families and 16.6% of the population were below the poverty line, including 18.4% of those under age 18 and 12.2% of those age 65 or over.

== Government ==
The municipality type is borough. The borough office is located at 1000 North Manor Street. The borough council holds meetings on the first Monday of each month at 7:30 p.m. in the municipal building. The current mayor is John Walker.

The borough is part of the 41st state senate district, represented by Republican Joe Pittman and the 66th state house district, represented by Republican Brian Smith. The borough is located within the 15th congressional district of the United States House of Representatives, currently represented by Republican Glenn Thompson. Current senators for Pennsylvania are Democrat Bob Casey, Jr. and Democrat John Fetterman.

== See also ==
- Marion Center Area School District
