= William Fraley =

American planter and industrialist (1795–1877)

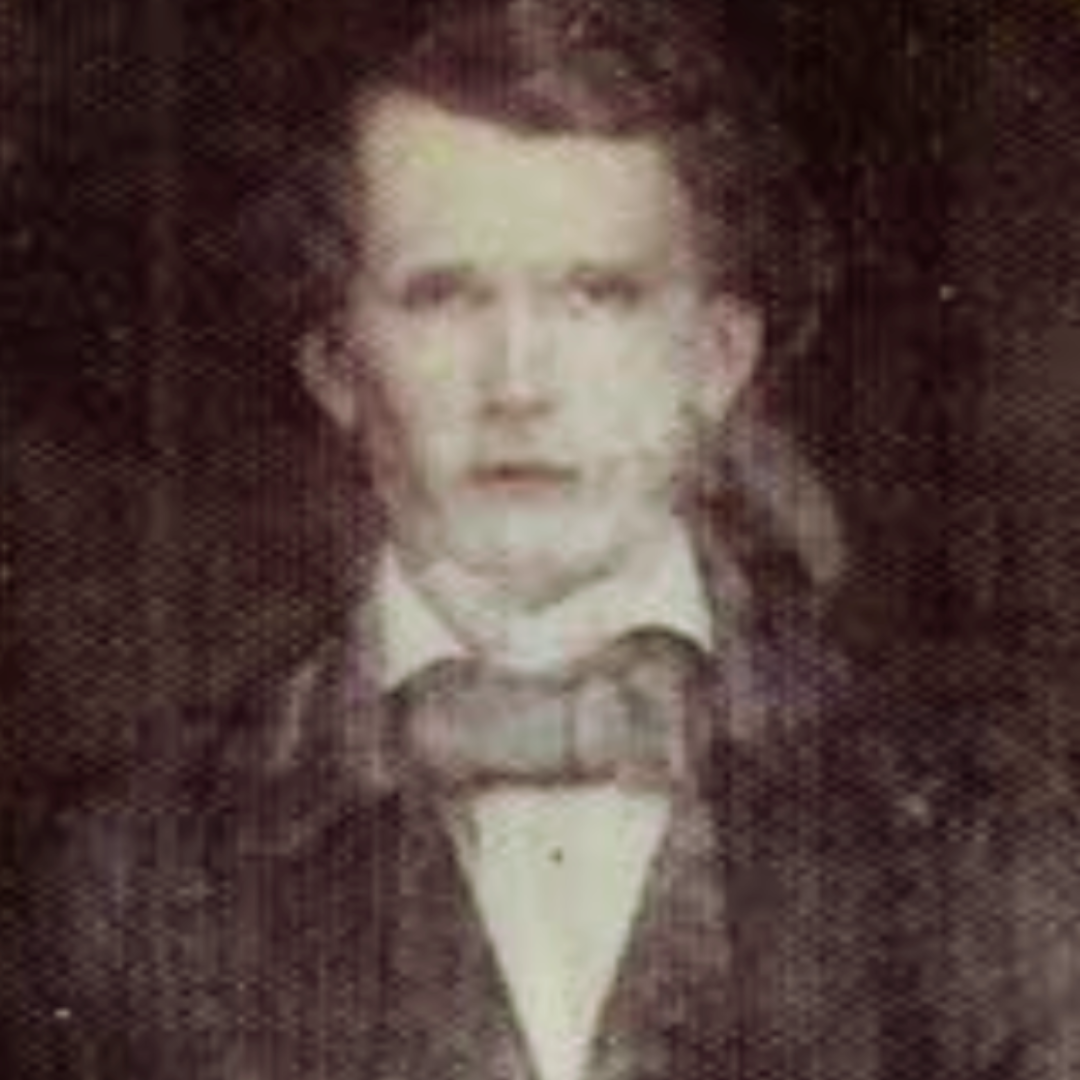
- Oil painting thought to depict Fraley
- Born: 1795
- Died: 1877 (aged 81–82); Sparta, Georgia, U.S.
- Education: Princeton University (did not graduate)
- Era: Antebellum South

William B. Fraley (1795 – 1877) was an American planter and industrialist who specialized in coachbuilding.

== Career ==
William Fraley moved from Pennsylvania to Sparta, Georgia, where he established a carriage business and later managed a family plantation with his brother-in-law, Ingram. After jointly purchasing the plantation in 1832, they acquired more land and slaves, who formed intermarried families on the estate. Fraley handled the outside business and cotton sales, while Ingram managed the farm.

Following the death of Ingram, Fraley successfully defended his claim to the estate in court, with the ruling affirming that Ingram intended to leave him the property.

In 1852, Fraley, along with his associates, planned to build a hotel in the town, with their firm, the Sparta House Company, being officially incorporated on January 14.

== Education ==
Fraley was a member of Princeton University's class of 1853, though he did not complete his studies.

== Personal life ==
Fraley was married and had children. He was a board member of the Sparta Female Model School, where his daughter Rebecca was enrolled in the 1830s.

He was involved in local community affairs, being appointed as a trustee of the Sparta Camp Ground in Hancock County in 1841; the act to incorporate the Sparta Camp Ground granted him and the other trustees the authority to establish by-laws for the governance of the camp "as they may deem fit."

During the Civil War, his wife served as president of the Ladies Soldiers Aid Society of Hancock—a Confederate organization dedicated to providing support and supplies to soldiers and their families. His son-in-law, Henry Culver, also served as a captain for the Southern Army and is said to have aided in diverting William Tecumseh Sherman and his troops from Sparta during his March to the Sea.

He died in 1877.
