= Linton Falls =

Linton Falls may refer to the following:

- Linton Falls (North Yorkshire), on the River Wharfe
  - Linton Falls Hydro, a hydroelectric station above the falls
- Linton Falls (Oregon), a waterfall in the Three Sisters Wilderness

== See also ==
- Linton (disambiguation)
