= Murder of Lauren Giddings =

Murder perpetrated by Stephen McDaniel

- Location: Macon, Georgia, U.S.
- Date: June 26, 2011; 15 years ago c. 4:30 a.m. (ET)
- Attack type: Murder by strangulation, dismemberment, home invasion
- Victim: Lauren Teresa Giddings
- Perpetrator: Stephen Mark McDaniel
- Verdict: Pleaded guilty
- Convictions: Felony murder
- Sentence: Life imprisonment with the possibility of parole after 30 years

Lauren Teresa Giddings (April 18, 1984 – June 26, 2011) was an American woman and a Mercer University School of Law graduate in the consolidated city-county of Macon, Georgia, studying to become a public defender. After graduating and while preparing for the bar exam, she disappeared. She was murdered by Stephen Mark McDaniel (born September 20, 1985) on June 26, 2011, in Macon, Georgia, United States. McDaniel pleaded guilty in 2014, and was sentenced to 30 years to life in prison.

== Background ==
Giddings was known as vibrant, kind-hearted, the eldest of three sisters, and the first in her family to attend college. McDaniel, who was from suburban Atlanta, had lived beside Giddings in neighboring apartments since fall 2008; the two were former classmates at Mercer University. They also were both members of Mercer's chapter of the Federalist Society, with McDaniel having served as the club's vice president and Giddings as its president.

== Disappearance ==
Giddings was reported missing on June 30, after returning to her Barristers Hall apartment in Macon to study, following her sister Kaitlyn’s wedding that summer in their home state of Maryland. According to Kaitlyn, Lauren had already told her family that after taking time off for her sister's wedding, she would devote herself entirely to studying for the bar exam.

By June 27, 2011, however, her family and friends noticed her silence. At first, they assumed she was simply immersed in studying, just as she had said she would be. But as days passed with no word from her, unease began to grow.

The realization that something was wrong came on June 29. That evening, a friend of Lauren’s called to ask if she had heard from her, but Kaitlyn had not. A quick check revealed unanswered text messages, and when Kaitlyn tried calling, Lauren’s phone went straight to voicemail. After reaching out to several of Lauren’s friends, she discovered that none of them had been able to get in touch either.

Eventually, she contacted the Macon-Bibb County Sheriff's Office and woke her father to tell him that Lauren was missing. Their father drove down to Macon immediately to file a missing person’s report, while their mother prepared to fly out later that day.

== Murder ==
According to McDaniel, at 4:30 a.m. on Sunday June 26, 2011, he used a master key to gain access to Giddings' apartment. Wearing a mask and gloves, McDaniel strangled her with his hands in her bedroom. The next day, he dismembered her body in the bathroom with a hacksaw. Most of Giddings' remains were discarded in a dumpster on campus. However, her torso was thrown in a trashcan outside the apartment complex.

== Investigation ==
On June 30, McDaniel did an interview with WGXA, claiming to be a concerned friend of Giddings. During the interview, he learned that the torso had been recovered. The video of the moment has since gone viral.

Later that day, McDaniel had gone to the police station with neighbors and Giddings’ friends to give statements about her disappearance. His interrogation lasted more than 12 hours, ending on July 1. Initially, McDaniel refused to allow a search of his apartment, explaining, "It’s the lawyer in me" and that he was "always protective of [his] space." By afternoon, however, McDaniel permitted the detective to walk through his apartment — with McDaniel himself accompanying — under the pretense of looking for Lauren.

At 12:18 a.m., detectives asked McDaniel about a couple of fresh scratches on his stomach. Police said the marks were consistent with fingernail scratches. McDaniel said he must have cut himself while he was sleeping.

He was then placed in jail, where he would remain for the next month. In August, McDaniel was charged with murder. Investigators had linked several pieces of evidence to him, including the hacksaw he used to dismember the body.

The rest of Giddings' remains have never been found.

== Aftermath ==
In 2014, McDaniel accepted a plea deal and pleaded guilty to murder. His deal required him to describe his account of the murder and, in exchange, he would receive a life sentence and avoid the death penalty. The judge also dismissed additional charges discovered during the investigation, including one count of burglary and 30 counts of sexual exploitation of children. One of the primary pieces of evidence were videos taken from McDaniel's personal computer, which showed him filming Giddings from outside her apartment the same night he murdered her, proving that the murder was premeditated. He will be eligible for parole in 2041.

In 2018, McDaniel's father, Mark McDaniel, started a GoFundMe campaign to raise funds for the legal expenses needed for an appeal. The page was promptly taken down. Stephen McDaniel represented himself in court while arguing for a retrial in 2018. He stated that his constitutional rights were violated as he was not medically cleared before giving consent for searches, his legal research was intercepted by the district attorney, and his attorneys did not adequately represent him. He also filed a malpractice complaint against his former attorney. The judge denied the appeal.

On May 30, 2022, another habeas corpus petition was filed by McDaniel claiming documents from defense trial preparations were stolen by the district attorney. In his petition, he requested his conviction be overturned and he be released from prison.

As of August 14, 2026, McDaniel is incarcerated at Hancock State Prison in Hancock County, Georgia.
