= Shivers-Simpson House =

Historic house in Georgia, United States

- U.S. National Register of Historic Places
- Location within Georgia
- Nearest city: Jewell, Georgia
- Coordinates: 33°18′30″N 82°47′30″W
- Built: c.1820
- Architectural style: Late Federal, Greek Revival
- NRHP reference No.: 70000207
- Added to NRHP: June 22, 1970

The Shivers-Simpson House, also known as Rock Mill, on the west bank of the Ogeechee River in Hancock County, Georgia, near Jewell, Georgia, was built around 1820. It was listed on the National Register of Historic Places in 1970.

(Could it be the building located at exactly 33.310982°N 82.796739°W?)

It is a three-story rectangular house, about 52 by 43 feet (16 m × 13 m) in plan, which William Shivers arranged to have built around 1820. Its first floor is a high basement, built of Salmon-colored brick laid on one course of granite blocks, and topped by a narrow course of the same. The house is late Federal in style, with "strong overtones of the Greek Revival.

As of 1970, it had only been modified significantly once, back in 1890, when an original raised portico at the main entrance was removed and replaced by a second-story porch. The main entrance retains its original glass-panelled fanlight, wide double doors, and side lights. In 1970, plans were underway to re-create the portico, which would again resemble a Greek Doric temple. A broad stairway would rise to the portico/entrance. The restoration was being guided by Edward Vason Jones.

The "story of Rock Mill" begins with William Shivers' father, Jonas Shiver, who was born in 1750 and fought in the American Revolutionary War. Jonas married in 1772, and by 1809 had migrated from Virginia to this area, and was living on the east bank of the Ogeechee River in Warren County, and was a mill owner and presumably a slave owner. His home was at the center of the small community then named "Shivers", now Mayfield. It also had a grist mill, a woolen mill, a store, a tavern, and a stage-stop and post office on the Augusta-to-Milledgeville stagecoach line. William Shivers, the son, built a grist mill on the west side of the river, in Hancock County, and then this frame house named for the mill, before 1820. His mills "manufactured 'cotton goods and wool yarns,' and carded wool for the local people", and he became rich and owned many enslaved people, who lived on the property and worked to maintain it and the household.

The house is located on Mayfield Road, on the Ogeechee River north of the community of Jewell, Georgia; Jewell is at the intersection of Mayfield Road and Georgia State Route 16. The road may now or also be called Hamburg St. Park Rd., which goes north to Mayfield.

A church, the Rock Mills Methodist Episcopal Church, about .25 miles (0.40 km) to the west, on three acres of Shivers' land, was the "lord-of-the-manor's church". (Could the remains of this church be the single surviving wall and church bell, apparently from some historic structure, now at the Jewell House, a wedding venue? Probably not.)

== See also ==
- Jewell Historic District
