= Hancock State Prison =

Men's prison in Georgia, United States

Coordinates: 33°14′48″N 82°57′02″W

- Interactive map of Hancock State Prison
- Location: 701 Prison Boulevard Sparta, Georgia address
- Capacity: 1191
- Opened: 1991
- Managed by: Georgia Department of Corrections

Hancock State Prison is a Georgia Department of Corrections state prison for men located in unincorporated Hancock County, Georgia, with a Sparta postal address. The facility opened in 1991 and currently has a capacity of 1191 prisoners.

In 2010, Hancock state prison participated in the 2010 Georgia prison strike using contraband cell phones. The goal was to improve safety in Georgia state prisons and get rid of free labor.

A riot in November 2011 left 12 prisoners injured. The fight was gang-related, and organized with contraband cell phones. Hancock is one of several high-security Georgia state prisons found to have a large percentage of inoperative locks. In June 2012 auditors found 28% of Hancock's locks either didn't work or could be defeated.

Hancock was one of nine Georgia state prisons implicated in an FBI sting operation announced in February 2016. The agency indicted 47 correction officers who'd agreed to deliver illegal drugs while in uniform. These charges were "part of a larger public corruption investigation into Georgia Correctional Facilities".

Convicted serial killer Wayne Williams is serving a life sentence at Hancock, as is Charles Lee Duffy.

== Notable inmates ==
| Inmate Name | Register Number | Status | Details |
|---|---|---|---|
| Stephen Mark McDaniel | 1001291310 | Life imprisonment with the possibility of parole after 30 years | Perpetrator of the 2011 Murder of Lauren Giddings. |
| Andre Jason Pugh | 1002405939 | Serving a life sentence. | Had his wife Tiffany murdered in 2014. |
