= Sparta Historic District (Sparta, Georgia) =

Historic district in Georgia, United States

- U.S. National Register of Historic Places
- U.S. Historic district
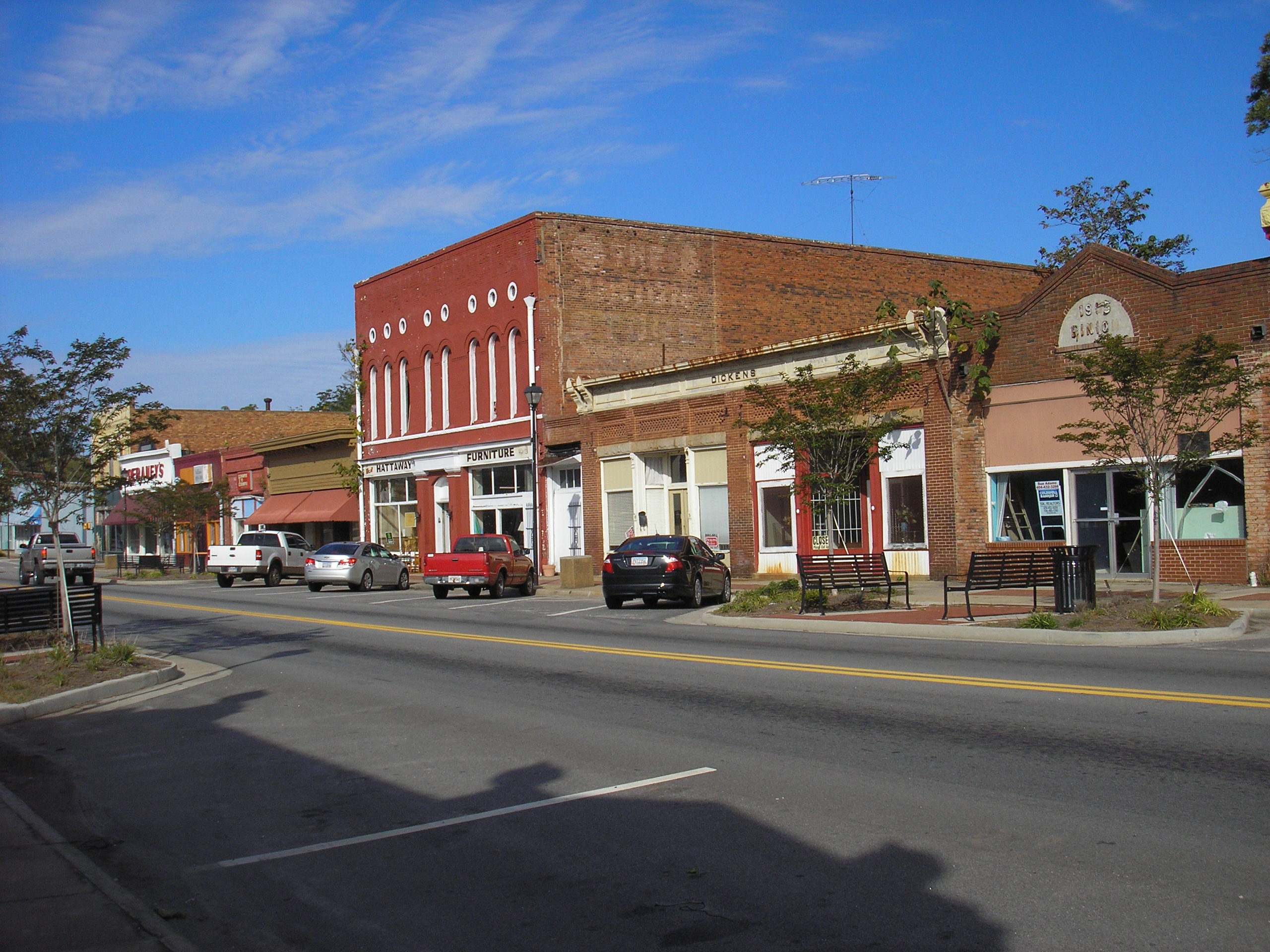

- Location within Georgia
- Location: Roughly bounded by Hamilton, Elm, W, and Burwell Sts., Sparta, Georgia
- Area: 50 acres (20 ha)
- Built: 1797
- Architect: Multiple
- Architectural style: Greek Revival, Late Victorian
- NRHP reference No.: 74000686
- Added to NRHP: April 16, 1974

The Sparta Historic District in Sparta, Georgia, is a 50 acres (20 ha) historic district which was listed on the National Register of Historic Places in 1974. It included 26 contributing buildings. The Rossiter-Little House is a contributing property.

The district is roughly bounded by Hamilton, Elm, W, and Burwell Streets.

It includes the Hancock County Courthouse, a brick courthouse which was designed in 1881 by architects Parkins and Bruce of Atlanta. The courthouse was completed by 1883. The morning of August 11, 2014, the courthouse was consumed in a fire, but was rebuilt and rededicated exactly 2-years after the fire.

== Gallery ==
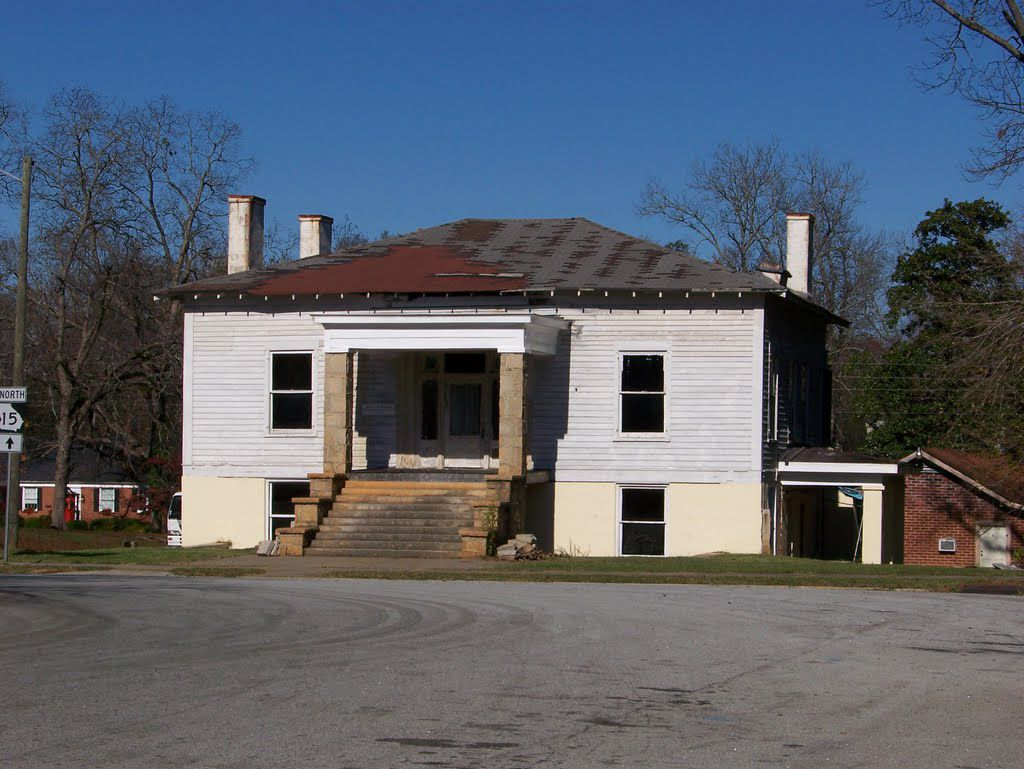
Roberts-Beall House

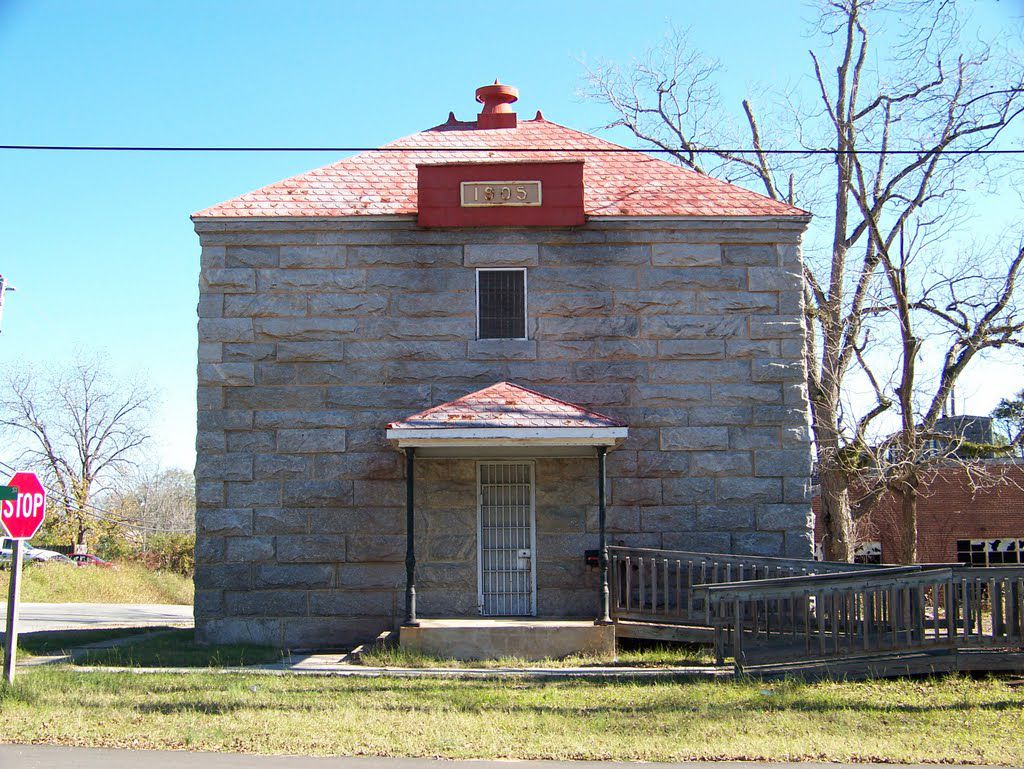
Old Hancock County Jail

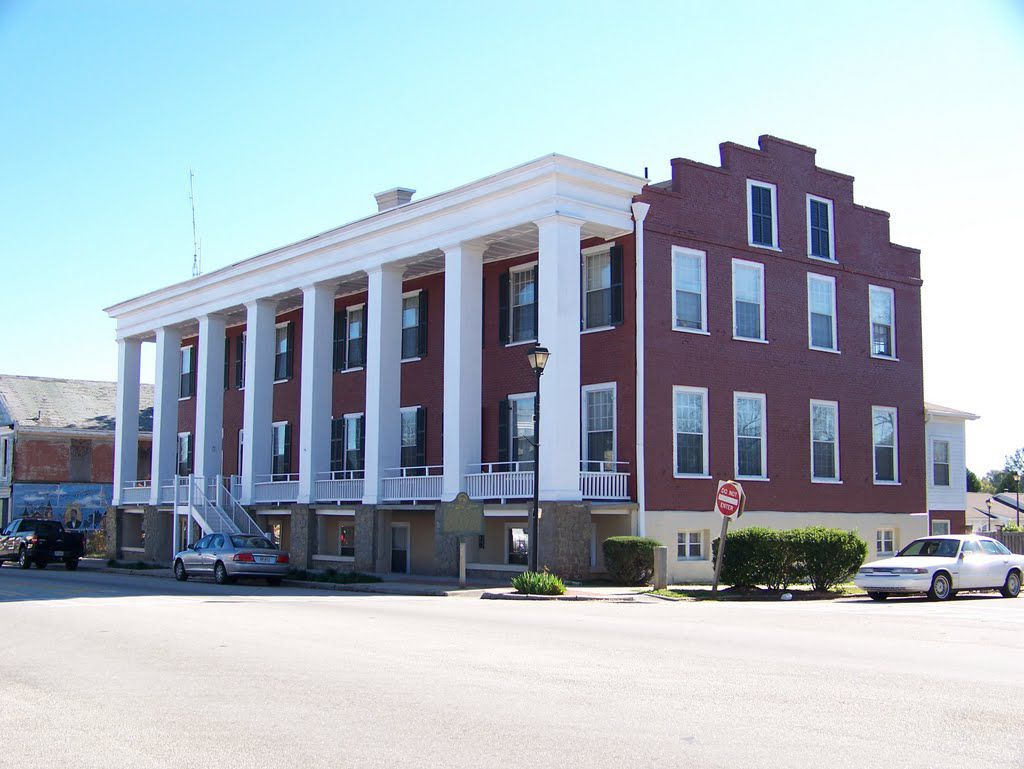
Old Eagle Tavern

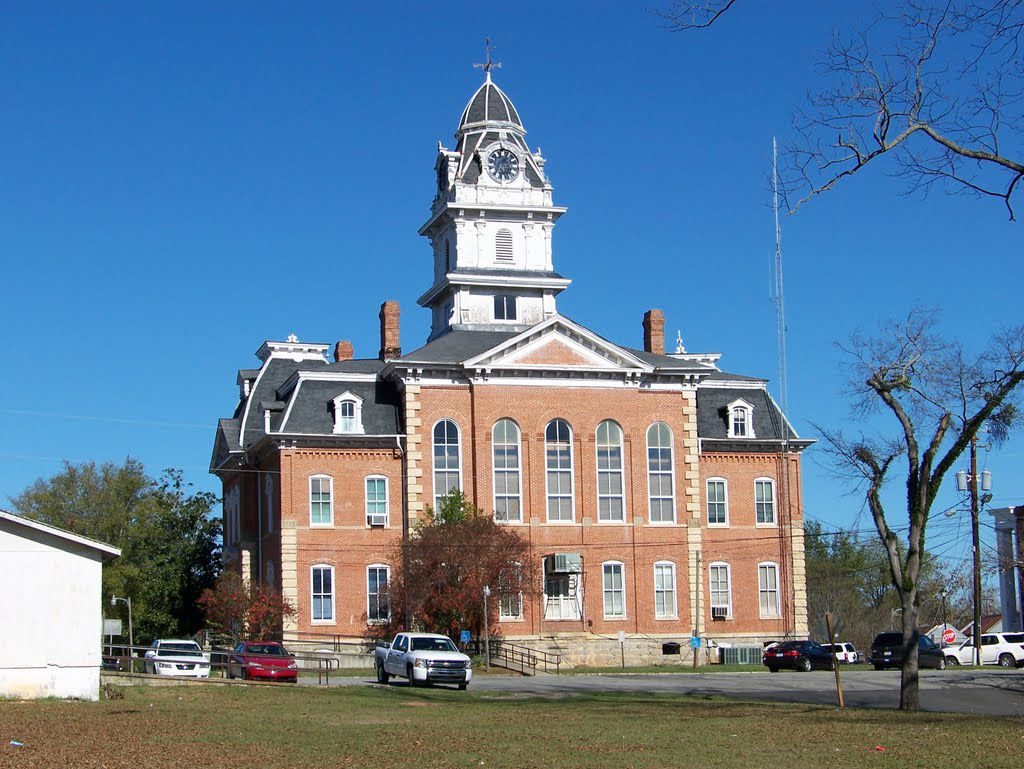
Hancock County Courthouse before fire & subsequent restoration
