= Jewell Historic District =

- U.S. National Register of Historic Places
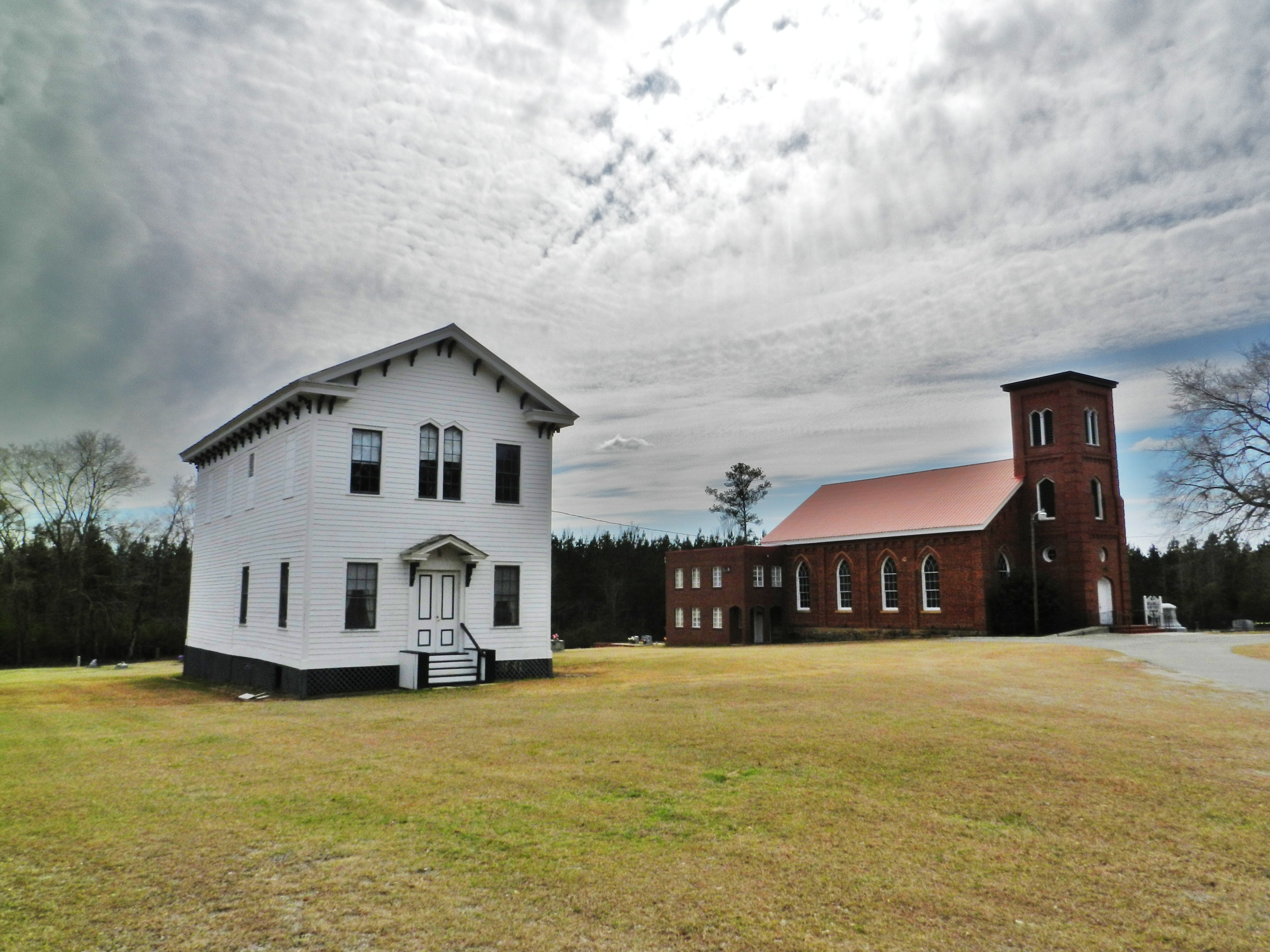

- Location within Georgia Location within the United States
- Location: GA 248 and GA 16, Jewell, Georgia
- Coordinates: 33°17′41″N 82°46′58″W
- Area: 56 acres (23 ha)
- Built: 1845
- Architectural style: Late Victorian, Queen Anne, Gothic Revival
- NRHP reference No.: 79003106
- Added to NRHP: May 14, 1979

The Jewell Historic District is a 56 acres (23 ha) historic district in Jewell, Georgia which was listed on the National Register of Historic Places in 1979.

It is a Georgia mill village in Hancock County, Georgia, about 12 miles (19 km) east of Sparta, and includes the area around the intersection of GA 248 and GA 16.

It includes Late Victorian, Queen Anne, Gothic Revival architecture. The listing included 37 contributing buildings and four contributing sites.
