= Prudence Punderson Rossiter =

American artist (1758–1784)

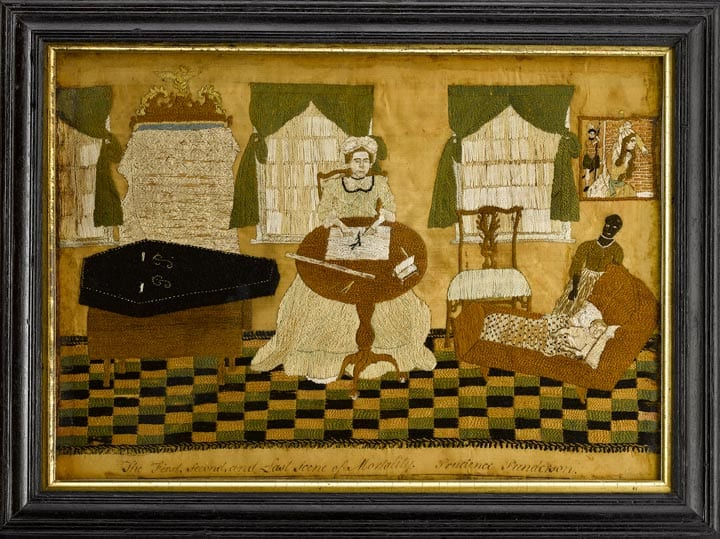
- The First, Second, and Last Scene of Mortality by Prudence Punderson
- Born: 1758
- Died: September 16, 1784 (aged 25–26)
- Spouse(s): Timothy Wells Rossiter
- Parent(s): Ebenezer Punderson; Prudence Geer Punderson

Prudence Punderson Rossiter (July 28, 1758 – September 16, 1784) was an American artist known for her needlework pictures.

== Birth and family ==
Originally from Preston, Connecticut, Rossiter was the first of eight children of Ebenezer Punderson and Prudence Geer Punderson; her father was a Loyalist during the American Revolutionary War, and as a result the family's goods were confiscated in 1778. The Pundersons fled to Long Island, where they lived in reduced circumstances for the duration of the war.

== Work and illness ==
Prudence turned to domestic work to earn money. In 1780 she overcame a severe illness that threatened her artistic ability; a letter to her sister from this time survives, speaking of a "gathering" on her breast that required lancing.

== Marriage and death ==
On October 20, 1783, she married Timothy Wells Rossiter; their daughter Sophia was born on July 18, 1784, and Prudence died on September 16 of the same year. She was interred in the Maple Cemetery in Berlin, Connecticut.

== Art ==
Rossiter produced a number of needlework pictures, including twelve depictions of the twelve apostles inspired by print sources. She is best known, however, for the self-portrait The First, Second, and Last Scene of Morality, completed around 1775. This work portrays a young woman, the artist herself, seated at a table in a finely-furnished parlor. To one side is a baby in a cradle, being cared for by a black servant. To the other is a coffin, marked "PP", sitting on a table.

The piece is owned by the Connecticut Historical Society. The same organization owns her other needlework pieces as well as her letters, poetry, drawings, and diary. They provide a rare glimpse into the life of a young woman of the period. Rossiter's embroidery is the most-reproduced piece in the Society's collection.

Elements of Rossiter's art have been incorporated into the work of artist Kiki Smith. Her needlework has been discussed by Laurel Thatcher Ulrich.
