= 1972 United States presidential election in Georgia =

- November 7, 1972

Nominee	Richard Nixon	George McGovern
Party	Republican	Democratic
Home state	California	South Dakota
Running mate	Spiro Agnew	Sargent Shriver
Electoral vote	12	0
Popular vote	881,496	289,529
Percentage	75.04%	24.65%
County results
Nixon
50–60%
60–70%
70–80%
80–90%
90–100%
President before election
Richard Nixon
Republican
Elected President
Richard Nixon
Republican

The 1972 United States presidential election in Georgia took place on November 7, 1972, as part of the 1972 United States presidential election. Georgia voters chose 12 representatives, or electors, to the Electoral College, who voted for president and vice president.

Georgia was won by incumbent President Richard Nixon (R–California), with 75.04% of the popular vote, against George McGovern (D–South Dakota), with 24.65% of the popular vote. This made Georgia, even amidst a Republican landslide, 26% more Republican than the nation at-large and made it Nixon's second strongest state in the 1972 election.

Among white voters, 90% supported Nixon while 10% supported McGovern.

As of the 2024 presidential election, this is the last time the following counties have ever voted Republican: Calhoun, Clay, Fulton (which contains the state's capital and largest city, Atlanta), Macon, Stewart, Talbot, Taliaferro, and Warren as well as the only time Hancock voted Republican. This was the first time any candidate had swept every Georgia county.

== Results ==
1972 United States presidential election in Georgia
Party	Candidate	Votes	%
Republican	Richard Nixon (inc.)	881,496	75.04%
Democratic	George McGovern	289,529	24.65%
Write–in		3,747 (Note: These write-in votes were not separated by county but given only as a state-wide total.)	0.32%
Total votes		1,174,772	100%

=== Results by county ===
County	Richard Nixon Republican		George McGovern Democratic		Margin		Total votes cast
County	#	%	#	%	#	%	Total votes cast
Appling	2,755	84.33%	512	15.67%	2,243	68.66%	3,267
Atkinson	924	74.94%	309	25.06%	615	49.88%	1,233
Bacon	1,771	90.22%	192	9.78%	1,579	80.44%	1,963
Baker	965	73.66%	345	26.34%	620	47.32%	1,310
Baldwin	4,826	77.08%	1,435	22.92%	3,391	54.16%	6,261
Banks	1,336	78.96%	356	21.04%	980	57.92%	1,692
Barrow	3,423	79.79%	867	20.21%	2,556	59.58%	4,290
Bartow	4,836	75.26%	1,590	24.74%	3,246	50.52%	6,426
Ben Hill	2,104	74.96%	703	25.04%	1,401	49.92%	2,807
Berrien	2,285	86.03%	371	13.97%	1,914	72.06%	2,656
Bibb	27,402	72.87%	10,201	27.13%	17,201	45.74%	37,603
Bleckley	2,308	85.96%	377	14.04%	1,931	71.92%	2,685
Brantley	1,587	82.44%	338	17.56%	1,249	64.88%	1,925
Brooks	2,430	79.08%	643	20.92%	1,787	58.16%	3,073
Bryan	1,409	84.27%	263	15.73%	1,146	68.54%	1,672
Bulloch	5,683	78.85%	1,524	21.15%	4,159	57.70%	7,207
Burke	2,846	72.90%	1,058	27.10%	1,788	45.80%	3,904
Butts	1,968	73.02%	727	26.98%	1,241	46.04%	2,695
Calhoun	892	64.31%	495	35.69%	397	28.62%	1,387
Camden	2,380	75.97%	753	24.03%	1,627	51.94%	3,133
Candler	1,427	85.71%	238	14.29%	1,189	71.42%	1,665
Carroll	8,296	79.36%	2,158	20.64%	6,138	58.72%	10,454
Catoosa	6,008	87.05%	894	12.95%	5,114	74.10%	6,902
Charlton	1,244	80.05%	310	19.95%	934	60.10%	1,554
Chatham	38,079	70.98%	15,566	29.02%	22,513	41.96%	53,645
Chattahoochee	345	74.03%	121	25.97%	224	48.06%	466
Chattooga	3,188	77.55%	923	22.45%	2,265	55.10%	4,111
Cherokee	5,509	82.62%	1,159	17.38%	4,350	65.24%	6,668
Clarke	11,465	65.31%	6,090	34.69%	5,375	30.62%	17,555
Clay	632	69.07%	283	30.93%	349	38.14%	915
Clayton	23,681	86.36%	3,740	13.64%	19,941	72.72%	27,421
Clinch	1,127	82.50%	239	17.50%	888	65.00%	1,366
Cobb	43,977	85.12%	7,688	14.88%	36,289	70.24%	51,665
Coffee	3,934	86.63%	607	13.37%	3,327	73.26%	4,541
Colquitt	6,900	88.12%	930	11.88%	5,970	76.24%	7,830
Columbia	4,839	83.65%	946	16.35%	3,893	67.30%	5,785
Cook	2,135	80.26%	525	19.74%	1,610	60.52%	2,660
Coweta	5,751	78.66%	1,560	21.34%	4,191	57.32%	7,311
Crawford	1,167	69.51%	512	30.49%	655	39.02%	1,679
Crisp	3,623	84.16%	682	15.84%	2,941	68.32%	4,305
Dade	2,110	93.45%	148	6.55%	1,962	86.90%	2,258
Dawson	828	78.26%	230	21.74%	598	56.52%	1,058
Decatur	4,292	78.21%	1,196	21.79%	3,096	56.42%	5,488
DeKalb	104,750	77.35%	30,671	22.65%	74,079	54.70%	135,421
Dodge	4,346	83.10%	884	16.90%	3,462	66.20%	5,230
Dooly	1,904	76.34%	590	23.66%	1,314	52.68%	2,494
Dougherty	12,878	78.03%	3,625	21.97%	9,253	56.06%	16,503
Douglas	6,610	87.07%	982	12.93%	5,628	74.14%	7,592
Early	2,396	82.37%	513	17.63%	1,883	64.74%	2,909
Echols	404	85.59%	68	14.41%	336	71.18%	472
Effingham	3,175	86.47%	497	13.53%	2,678	72.94%	3,672
Elbert	2,875	76.48%	884	23.52%	1,991	52.96%	3,759
Emanuel	3,684	80.09%	916	19.91%	2,768	60.18%	4,600
Evans	1,666	81.63%	375	18.37%	1,291	63.26%	2,041
Fannin	3,783	79.95%	949	20.05%	2,834	59.90%	4,732
Fayette	3,401	88.31%	450	11.69%	2,951	76.62%	3,851
Floyd	15,485	82.12%	3,372	17.88%	12,113	64.24%	18,857
Forsyth	2,968	84.39%	549	15.61%	2,419	68.78%	3,517
Franklin	2,022	82.30%	435	17.70%	1,587	64.60%	2,457
Fulton	96,256	56.43%	74,329	43.57%	21,927	12.86%	170,585
Gilmer	2,729	78.04%	768	21.96%	1,961	56.08%	3,497
Glascock	578	93.38%	41	6.62%	537	86.76%	619
Glynn	9,443	75.88%	3,002	24.12%	6,441	51.76%	12,445
Gordon	4,344	83.31%	870	16.69%	3,474	66.62%	5,214
Grady	3,732	81.02%	874	18.98%	2,858	62.04%	4,606
Greene	1,679	64.63%	919	35.37%	760	29.26%	2,598
Gwinnett	18,181	86.26%	2,896	13.74%	15,285	72.52%	21,077
Habersham	971	84.95%	172	15.05%	799	69.90%	1,143
Hall	10,686	81.41%	2,440	18.59%	8,246	62.82%	13,126
Hancock	1,595	51.50%	1,502	48.50%	93	3.00%	3,097
Haralson	3,460	81.85%	767	18.15%	2,693	63.70%	4,227
Harris	2,617	78.87%	701	21.13%	1,916	57.74%	3,318
Hart	2,308	74.64%	784	25.36%	1,524	49.28%	3,092
Heard	1,239	81.78%	276	18.22%	963	63.56%	1,515
Henry	5,155	77.93%	1,460	22.07%	3,695	55.86%	6,615
Houston	13,576	84.16%	2,556	15.84%	11,020	68.32%	16,132
Irwin	1,851	84.68%	335	15.32%	1,516	69.36%	2,186
Jackson	4,124	79.63%	1,055	20.37%	3,069	59.26%	5,179
Jasper	1,289	73.57%	463	26.43%	826	47.14%	1,752
Jeff Davis	1,857	86.01%	302	13.99%	1,555	72.02%	2,159
Jefferson	2,777	70.11%	1,184	29.89%	1,593	40.22%	3,961
Jenkins	1,769	78.52%	484	21.48%	1,285	57.04%	2,253
Johnson	2,201	84.07%	417	15.93%	1,784	68.14%	2,618
Jones	2,483	74.25%	861	25.75%	1,622	48.50%	3,344
Lamar	1,844	73.47%	666	26.53%	1,178	46.94%	2,510
Lanier	850	81.50%	193	18.50%	657	63.00%	1,043
Laurens	7,350	77.53%	2,130	22.47%	5,220	55.06%	9,480
Lee	1,441	78.70%	390	21.30%	1,051	57.40%	1,831
Liberty	2,337	65.76%	1,217	34.24%	1,120	31.52%	3,554
Lincoln	1,246	78.56%	340	21.44%	906	57.12%	1,586
Long	764	76.40%	236	23.60%	528	52.80%	1,000
Lowndes	7,812	79.50%	2,015	20.50%	5,797	59.00%	9,827
Lumpkin	1,477	79.32%	385	20.68%	1,092	58.64%	1,862
Macon	2,005	70.55%	837	29.45%	1,168	41.10%	2,842
Madison	2,606	82.00%	572	18.00%	2,034	64.00%	3,178
Marion	850	83.83%	164	16.17%	686	67.66%	1,014
McDuffie	2,990	75.01%	996	24.99%	1,994	50.02%	3,986
McIntosh	1,367	62.14%	833	37.86%	534	24.28%	2,200
Meriwether	3,420	73.82%	1,213	26.18%	2,207	47.64%	4,633
Miller	1,269	91.49%	118	8.51%	1,151	82.98%	1,387
Mitchell	2,400	68.18%	1,120	31.82%	1,280	36.36%	3,520
Monroe	2,181	73.43%	789	26.57%	1,392	46.86%	2,970
Montgomery	1,370	80.26%	337	19.74%	1,033	60.52%	1,707
Morgan	2,007	75.03%	668	24.97%	1,339	50.06%	2,675
Murray	2,643	80.41%	644	19.59%	1,999	60.82%	3,287
Muscogee	28,449	77.55%	8,234	22.45%	20,215	55.10%	36,683
Newton	4,647	77.10%	1,380	22.90%	3,267	54.20%	6,027
Oconee	2,029	81.39%	464	18.61%	1,565	62.78%	2,493
Oglethorpe	1,712	84.00%	326	16.00%	1,386	68.00%	2,038
Paulding	2,814	73.70%	1,004	26.30%	1,810	47.40%	3,818
Peach	3,747	60.83%	2,413	39.17%	1,334	21.66%	6,160
Pickens	2,101	80.16%	520	19.84%	1,581	60.32%	2,621
Pierce	1,982	88.05%	269	11.95%	1,713	76.10%	2,251
Pike	1,432	77.20%	423	22.80%	1,009	54.40%	1,855
Polk	4,929	78.91%	1,317	21.09%	3,612	57.82%	6,246
Pulaski	1,966	81.58%	444	18.42%	1,522	63.16%	2,410
Putnam	1,963	76.47%	604	23.53%	1,359	52.94%	2,567
Quitman	502	78.19%	140	21.81%	362	56.38%	642
Rabun	1,477	80.14%	366	19.86%	1,111	60.28%	1,843
Randolph	1,603	66.76%	798	33.24%	805	33.52%	2,401
Richmond	24,362	72.55%	9,219	27.45%	15,143	45.10%	33,581
Rockdale	3,560	81.82%	791	18.18%	2,769	63.64%	4,351
Schley	694	81.07%	162	18.93%	532	62.14%	856
Screven	2,402	80.69%	575	19.31%	1,827	61.38%	2,977
Seminole	1,851	83.12%	376	16.88%	1,475	66.24%	2,227
Spalding	7,183	80.84%	1,702	19.16%	5,481	61.68%	8,885
Stephens	3,773	81.24%	871	18.76%	2,902	62.48%	4,644
Stewart	1,020	74.29%	353	25.71%	667	48.58%	1,373
Sumter	4,533	78.14%	1,268	21.86%	3,265	56.28%	5,801
Talbot	990	66.09%	508	33.91%	482	32.18%	1,498
Taliaferro	585	61.13%	372	38.87%	213	22.26%	957
Tattnall	2,892	85.46%	492	14.54%	2,400	70.92%	3,384
Taylor	1,580	75.45%	514	24.55%	1,066	50.90%	2,094
Telfair	2,245	76.57%	687	23.43%	1,558	53.14%	2,932
Terrell	2,057	74.99%	686	25.01%	1,371	49.98%	2,743
Thomas	6,668	75.44%	2,171	24.56%	4,497	50.88%	8,839
Tift	4,591	84.91%	816	15.09%	3,775	69.82%	5,407
Toombs	4,080	85.80%	675	14.20%	3,405	71.60%	4,755
Towns	1,573	79.56%	404	20.44%	1,169	59.12%	1,977
Treutlen	1,346	86.50%	210	13.50%	1,136	73.00%	1,556
Troup	8,350	80.24%	2,056	19.76%	6,294	60.48%	10,406
Turner	2,120	82.91%	437	17.09%	1,683	65.82%	2,557
Twiggs	1,363	55.05%	1,113	44.95%	250	10.10%	2,476
Union	2,317	75.74%	742	24.26%	1,575	51.48%	3,059
Upson	4,892	84.52%	896	15.48%	3,996	69.04%	5,788
Walker	8,728	84.72%	1,574	15.28%	7,154	69.44%	10,302
Walton	3,994	77.80%	1,140	22.20%	2,854	55.60%	5,134
Ware	6,578	79.23%	1,724	20.77%	4,854	58.46%	8,302
Warren	1,175	71.21%	475	28.79%	700	42.42%	1,650
Washington	3,901	75.79%	1,246	24.21%	2,655	51.58%	5,147
Wayne	3,677	83.38%	733	16.62%	2,944	66.76%	4,410
Webster	483	81.73%	108	18.27%	375	63.46%	591
Wheeler	1,093	78.80%	294	21.20%	799	57.60%	1,387
White	1,537	81.76%	343	18.24%	1,194	63.52%	1,880
Whitfield	8,591	81.46%	1,955	18.54%	6,636	62.92%	10,546
Wilcox	1,863	85.54%	315	14.46%	1,548	71.08%	2,178
Wilkes	2,195	77.26%	646	22.74%	1,549	54.52%	2,841
Wilkinson	2,196	74.52%	751	25.48%	1,445	49.04%	2,947
Worth	2,942	84.44%	542	15.56%	2,400	68.88%	3,484
Totals	881,496	75.04%	289,529	24.65%	591,967	50.39%	1,174,772 (Note: This total included 3,747 write-in votes not separated by county but given only as a state-wide total.)

== Works cited ==
- Black, Earl; Black, Merle (1992). The Vital South: How Presidents Are Elected. Harvard University Press. ISBN 0674941306.
