= Rochester Mills, Pennsylvania =

Unincorporated village in Pennsylvania, U.S.

Coordinates: 40°49′07″N 78°59′08″W

Rochester Mills is an unincorporated village in Grant Township in northern Indiana County, Pennsylvania, United States. The community is served by the 286 exchange in Area Code 724. Zip Code 15771. Until the district consolidated its primary schools in 2010, the village was home to Canoe-Grant Elementary School, a part of Marion Center Area School District. The district sold the building and land.

== Geography ==
The village is located at 40.819 north latitude and 78.986 west longitude. Its elevation is 1,315 feet (401 m) above sea level. Former state highway PA-236 ran through the village until it was decommissioned in 1985. Today, that route is numbered 1038 and 1045. The village was formerly known as Richmond, but the post office was called Rochester Mills. It was also known as Savan for the dam and train stop.
