= Glen Mary Plantation =

Historic house in Georgia, United States

- Glen Mary
- U.S. National Register of Historic Places
- U.S. National Historic Site
- Location within Georgia
- Location: Sparta, Georgia, US
- Coordinates: 33.1778°N 83.0016°W
- Built: 1848
- Architect: Theophilus Jackson Smith
- Architectural style: Greek Revival
- NRHP reference No.: 74000687
- Added to NRHP: May 8, 1974

Glen Mary is an historical home located in Hancock County, Georgia, near the town of Sparta. The home was listed on the Georgia Register of Historic Places in 1973, and on the National Register of Historic Places on May 8, 1974. As of 2013, Glen Mary is owned by Preservation America.

== History ==
Theophilus Jackson Smith built the home on 2,400 acres (970 ha) in 1848 for his bride Mary Gonder. Glen Mary is Scottish for "Mary's Valley," and is a two-story Greek Revival house. Smith was a founding member of the Planters' Club of Hancock County, a pioneer agricultural society. He also served in the Georgia legislature and the Fifteenth Georgia Regiment during the American Civil War. Smith moved to Washington County and advertised Glen Mary for sale in 1859 in The Southern Recorder. Smith sold Glen Mary and 542 acres (219 ha) in 1869 to General Ethan A. Hitchcock and his wife Martha Rind Nicholls Hitchcock. General Hitchcock died at Glen Mary in 1870.

== Honors ==
Scenic America named Glen Mary to its Last Chance Landscapes in 2002–03, designating the plantation as one of the top ten most threatened scenic landscapes in the US. Meg McGuire, former president of Scenic America, said Glen Mary was placed on the list because it faced the threat of being destroyed by logging, and it is "typical of historic sites in which the site has been saved but the context is destroyed". The house was also named a National Treasure by Save America's Treasures, the White House Millennium Council's initiative to save America's cultural artifacts. Consultants on the project have included historian William Seale, who wrote the book on the White House for its bicentennial, and architect Charles A. Phillips, chief architect on the restoration of the Miles Brewton House in Charleston, South Carolina. Ian Firth, a faculty member with the University of Georgia College of Environment & Design is the landscape and garden consultant.
