= Timothy Wells Rossiter =

American physician (1751–1845)

- Born: March 18, 1751; New London, Connecticut, US
- Died: August 27, 1845 (aged 94); Sparta, Georgia, US
- Occupation: Medical Doctor
- Board member of: Mount Zion church in 1815 when he was ordained one of the original elders.
- Spouse(s): Prudence Punderson Rossiter (m. 1758–1784) Deborah Rossiter (m. 1755–1845)

Timothy Wells Rossiter (March 28, 1751 – August 27, 1845) was a medical doctor and later an American Revolutionary War surgeon under General George Washington.

== Early life ==
Rossiter was born on March 28, 1751, in New London, Connecticut. He was the son of a Presbyterian Congregational minister.

== American Revolution ==
Timothy W. Rosseter is listed as serving as a Surgeon's Mate of Fellow's Massachusetts Regiment from May to December 1775 and as a Surgeon's Mate in the 19th Continental Infantry from January 1 to December 31, 1776. He is also noted in Georgia's Roster of the Revolution as being a Surgeon's mate and Surgeon as well. Rossiter served in the Continental Troops, Second Regiment, Light Dragoons. The Second Regiment Light Dragoons was commissioned by Congress at General Washington's request on December 12, 1776. Washington directed the Regiment's commander, Elisha Sheldon of Litchfield, Conn. to choose "gentlemen of true spirits and of good character". In the next five months, the Regiment was mustered and trained at Wethersfield, Conn. by Major Benjamin Tallmadge. On the 6th of June 1777, after hearing local pastor Judah Champion exhort them "to be the avenging angels of destiny", they rode to support Washington's New Jersey campaign.

== Post-war life ==
In October 1783, Rosssiter married Prudence Punderson, whose family were Loyalists during the Revolution.

Rosseter is listed in the tax list for the Ranes District of Hancock County, in 1794 for the Georgia Tax Index, 1789–1799.

A Georgia Tax List of 1812 lists "Tim. W. Rosseter" as living in Hancock County.

Timothy W. Rossiter is listed as a charter member of Mt. Zion Presbyterian Church and was ordained one of the original elders, which was organized in 1813 and a church built in 1814 from funds raised. (The church became a Methodist congregation in 1903; in 1969 the property was donated to the Hancock County Foundation for Historic Preservation.)

As a former military serviceman, Timothy W. Rosseter is listed as successfully drawing for land in the Georgia Land Lottery of April 12, 1827. It notes him as having served during the Revolutionary War. It appears that he received land in the 108th Captains District, No. 249, District 13, Lee County.

The Georgia Pension Roll of 1835 notes that Timothy W. Rosseter had served in the Revolutionary War as a Surgeon's Mate (an officer), in the Connecticut Continental Line. He was approved to receive an annual allowance of $240, based on his rank, and his pension started on March 27, 1832, when he was 82 years of age.

In the US Census of 1840, "Timothy Rossiter" is listed as among ten Revolutionary War pensioners still alive in Hancock County, aged 90 years.
