= Culverton, Georgia =

- Unincorporated community
- Location within Georgia Location within the United States
- Coordinates: 33°18′31″N 82°53′43″W
- Country: United States
- State: Georgia
- County: Hancock
- Established: 1795
- Elevation: 554 ft (169 m)
- Time zone: UTC-5 (Eastern (EST))
  - Summer (DST): UTC-4 (EDT)
- GNIS feature ID: 355405

Culverton (also Mount Carmel) is an unincorporated community in Hancock County, Georgia, United States. It lies along State Route 16 to the east of the city of Sparta, the county seat of Hancock County. Its elevation is 554 feet (169 m). The community is part of the Milledgeville Micropolitan Statistical Area.

Culverton was named after Hardy Culver, an early resident.

== See also ==
- Central Savannah River Area
