= Rossiter-Little House =

Historic house in the US state of Georgia

- U.S. Historic district – Contributing property
- Location: Hancock County, Sparta, Georgia
- Coordinates: 33.2753°N 82.9792°W
- Built: 1797
- Part of: Sparta Historic District (Sparta, Georgia) (ID74000686)
- Designated CP: April 11, 1974

Rossiter-Little House is generally considered the oldest house in Sparta, Georgia, United States. The present structure was built onto and around a log cabin (1797). The structure was built on the highest point in Sparta and used initially as a fort. Beneath the crawlspace of the present house, the original structure of the log foundation is still in place. The Rossiter-Little House was probably built about 1798 when Timothy Wells Rossiter, a Revolutionary War surgeon from Connecticut, bought the northeast corner lot at Broad and Miles Streets or the year after that when he bought the adjoining lot to the east. It is a contributing property of the Sparta Historic District, listed on the National Register of Historic Places in 1974. It is also part of the Historic American Buildings Survey.

The main part of the house is built on a classic New England saltbox design typical of the 17th and 18th centuries. Dr. Rossiter displays his ancestral ties by building a house in a form distinct to that region. This style of house became used infrequently at the close of the eighteenth century for large home construction as the more popular Georgian and Federal styles were used throughout the region and may offer an insight into the house design he had been familiar with (or lived in) prior to emigrating to Georgia from Connecticut.

The Rossiter-Little House has been modified, however, from the archetypical New England form by having two front projecting wings or ells with an inset front porch or gallery between them. This is an atypical design for New England, but it does appear infrequently in some late 18th and early 19th century Southern plantations, such as the Kingsley Plantation (c. 1798) in Duval County, Florida, just below the Georgia border.

== Architectural description ==
A 1983 description of the house from The Georgia Catalog, Historic American Buildings Survey: "Frame with clapboarding, flush siding under porch, Central block 30' 4" (three bay front) with projecting wings 18' 2" (one-bay front). One and one-half stories, central block with spraddle roof and dormer windows, the wings with gable roofs. Two exposed end chimneys, two end chimneys within exterior walls, one interior chimney. Three bay front porch across central block, terminating at wings. Columns and frieze with Chinese lattice-design insets. Full length windows on porch. Six panel entrance door with transom. Central hall plan. Original part built before 1812, possible late 18th Century. Wings and front porch built before 1860, windows on porch probably enlarged at same time. Rear ell added later. Dormer windows in front enlarged and changed before 1937. Porch probably had balustrade, probably sheaf of wheat design. This removed before 1937. 3 exterior photos (1937), 1 interior photo (1936), 1 data page (1936). Illustrated on p, 157"

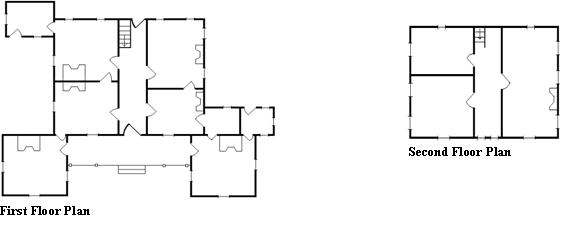
Rossiter-Little House floor plans
