= Marion Center Area School District =

School district in Pennsylvania

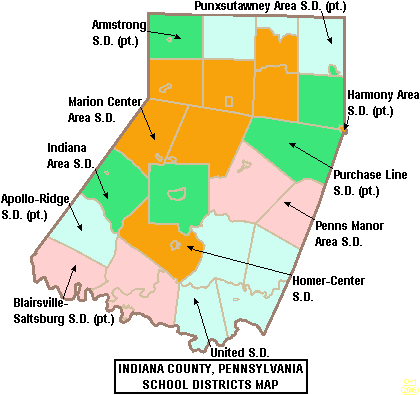

Address
- 22820 Pennsylvania 403 Marion Center, Indiana County, Pennsylvania, 15759; United States
- Coordinates: 40.74582°N 79.03409°W

District information
- Type: Public
- Grades: K-12
- Superintendent: Clint Weimer
- School board: President: Gregg Sacco Vice President: William McMillen Treasurer: William Cornman Voting Member: Charles Beatty Jr. Voting Member: Victoria Dicken Voting Member: Dwight Farmery Voting Member: Ronald Fulton Voting Member: Charles Glasser Voting Member: Tony Moretti
- Budget: $27,040,365

Students and staff
- District mascot: Stingers
- Colors: Green and Gold

Other information
- Website: www.mcasd.net

This is the logo of the Marion Center Stingers, the school district's mascot.

The Marion Center Area School District is a school district in the state of Pennsylvania. It is located in Marion Center in Indiana County. It also serves the municipalities of Creekside, Washington Township, Ernest, Rayne Township, Plumville, East Mahoning Township, South Mahoning Township, Grant Township, and Canoe Township. The school's athletic teams compete in the Heritage Conference of District 6.

== School campus ==
The school district consists of three buildings: Marion Center Area High School (grades 7–12), Rayne Elementary School (grades Pre-K–6), and W. A. McCreery Elementary School (grades Pre-K–6). The High School and W. A. McCreery Elementary are situated on the school's main campus at the intersection of 119 North and Pennsylvania 403 in Marion Center.

The school's campus at one time extended to additional schools: Creekside-Washington Elementary School in Creekside, and Canoe-Grant Elementary School in Rochester Mills. Both buildings closed in 2010 during consolidation and were later sold in 2012.

The school district is bordered by five other school districts: Indiana Area S. D., Penns Manor S. D., Punxsutawney S. D., Purchase Line S.D., as well as Armstrong S.D. (in Armstrong County).

=== Elementary schools ===
- Rayne Elementary School
  2535 Rte. 119 Hwy. N.
  Home, Pennsylvania 15747
- W. A. McCreery Elementary School
  PO Box 199
  22810 Pennsylvania 403
  Marion Center, Pennsylvania 15759

=== High school ===
- Marion Center Area High School
  PO Box 209
  22800 Pennsylvania 403
  Marion Center, Pennsylvania 15759

== Governance ==
The school district is governed by 9 individually elected board members (serve four-year terms), the Pennsylvania State Board of Education, the Pennsylvania Department of Education and the Pennsylvania General Assembly. The federal government controls programs it funds like Title I funding for low-income children in the Elementary and Secondary Education Act and the No Child Left Behind Act, which mandates the district focus resources on student success in acquiring reading and math skills.

== History ==
The Marion Center High School began in 1916 as a three-year high school on North Manor Street in Marion Center. The first class of two persons (Edgar Dawson and Walter Simpson) was graduated April 16, 1917.

In 1929 a new brick building was erected by E.E. Nupp Construction Co., Starford, Pa. This is now incorporated into the present high school building. The faculty was headed by William A. McCreery who had been teaching here since 1925 and was elected principal in 1928. In 1954 work on an extensive addition to the high school was begun and continued into 1955. Addition classrooms, including a new commercial department, a shop, and storage facilities were added to the building in 1962. The Marion Center East Mahoning Joint School Board was organized in 1928.

In 1951 an important change came with the organization of a new high school jointure consisting of Marion Center, Canoe Independent, East Mahoning, Grant, Rayne, South Mahoning, Plumville, and Washington. The new joint school board, with representatives from each district, supplanted the old Marion Center-East Mahoning Joint Board effective July 1, 1951. From this point, the high school and its affiliate elementary buildings became known as the Marion Center Area School District. Mr. McCreery was elected Supervising Principal.

In 1955 the jointure was extended to the elementary grades. Under the School District Reorganization Act of 1963, effective July 1, 1966, the school assumed the title of Marion Center Area High School.

== Athletics ==
=== Boys Athletics ===
- Baseball - Class AA
- Basketball - Class AA
- Cross Country - Class AA
- Football - Class AA
- Swimming - Class AA
- Track and Field - Class AA
- Wrestling - Class AA

=== Girls Athletics ===
- Basketball - Class AA
- Cross Country - Class AA
- Softball - Class AA
- Swimming- Class AA
- Track and Field - Class AA
- Volleyball - Class AA

The school district has many extra-curricular activities, including an AFJROTC and a marching band.
