= Mayfield, Georgia =

- Unincorporated community
- Location within Georgia Location within the United States
- Coordinates: 33°21′19″N 82°48′03″W
- Country: United States
- State: Georgia
- County: Hancock
- Elevation: 404 ft (123 m)
- Time zone: UTC-5 (Eastern (EST))
  - Summer (DST): UTC-4 (EDT)
- GNIS feature ID: 332340

Mayfield is an unincorporated community in Hancock County, Georgia, United States on the outskirts of its primary city Sparta.

== History ==
Mayfield was named after the plantation home of William Smith, a local judge.

The Shivers-Simpson House, also known as "Rock Mill", south of Mayfield along Mayfield Rd., is listed on the National Register of Historic Places.
