= Jewell, Georgia =

Jewell
- Unincorporated community
- Location within the state of Georgia Jewell (the United States)
- Coordinates: 33°17′47″N 82°46′38″W
- Country: United States
- State: Georgia
- County: Warren, Hancock
- Elevation: 420 ft (130 m)
- Time zone: UTC-5 (Eastern (EST))
  - Summer (DST): UTC-4 (EDT)
- ZIP codes: 31045
- GNIS feature ID: 332098

Jewell (also Jewells, Jewells Mills, Rock Factory, and Shivers) is an unincorporated community in the U.S. state of Georgia. It lies along Georgia Piedmont Scenic Byway/State Route 16 to the southwest of the city of Warrenton, the county seat of Warren County. Jewell's elevation is 420 feet (128 m). It has a post office with the ZIP code 31045. It is by the Ogeechee River, which is the western border of Warren County at this point.

Jewell has also been described as being at, or including, the intersection of Mayfield Road/Hamburg State Park Road and Georgia State Route 16, which is west across the Ogeechee River in Hancock County. The "Jewell House", a historic home which is now a wedding venue, is on the west side of the river.

The Jewell Historic District, in Hancock County, is listed on the National Register of Historic Places.

The Shivers-Simpson House, a short way up the Mayfield Road, is listed on the National Register of Historic Places.

== See also ==
- Central Savannah River Area
- Buddy Moss
