= Linton Sirait =

Indonesian judge (born 1956)

Linton Sirait (born 1956) is an Indonesian District Court judge in Bali. He is a Batak Christian from Medan in Sumatra.

As of 2005, out of 500 defendants facing drugs charges before him, not one was acquitted.
