= Grant Township, Indiana County, Pennsylvania =

Township in Pennsylvania, US

Coordinates: 40°47′00″N 78°57′00″W

Grant Township, Pennsylvania
- Township
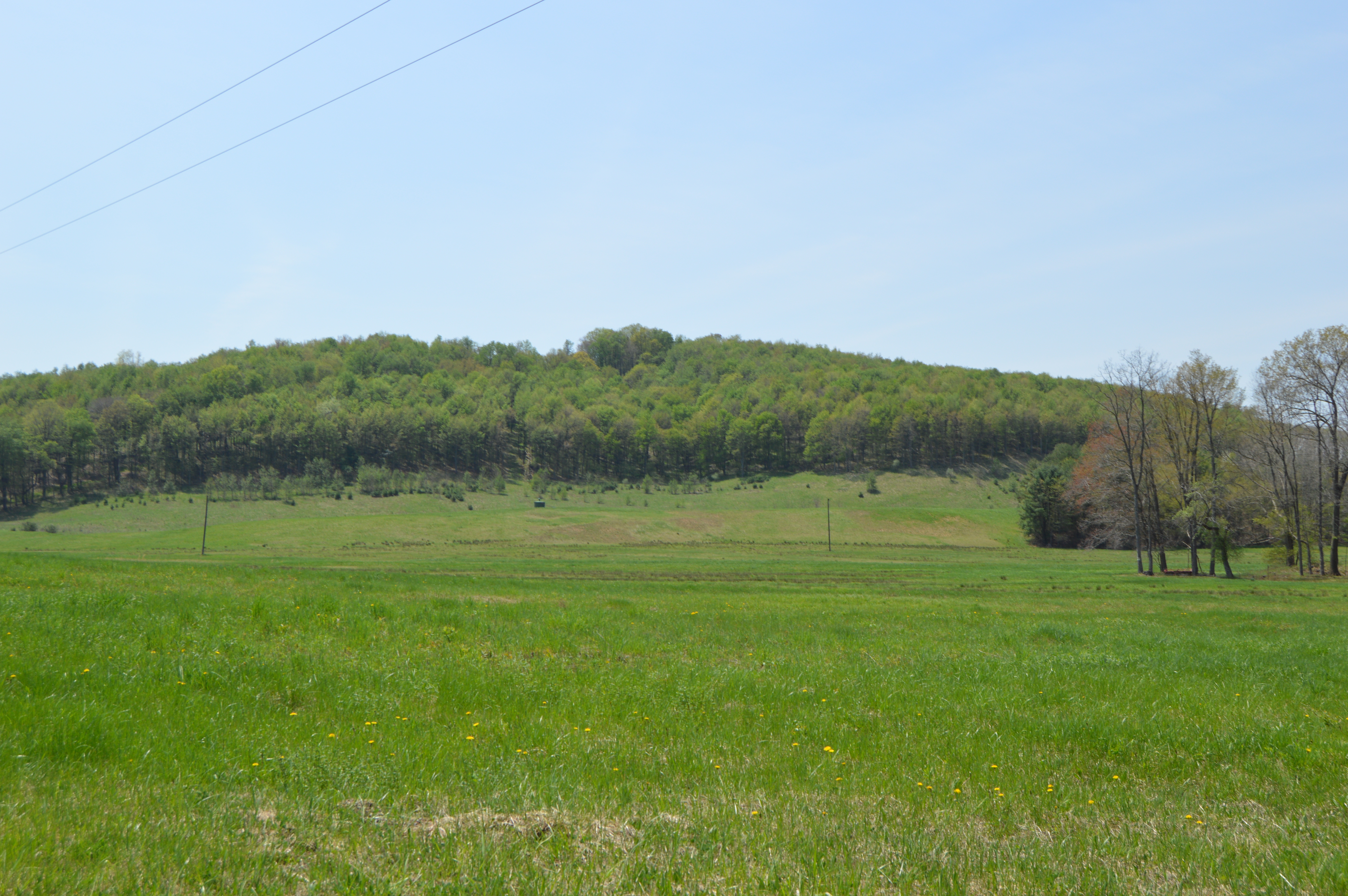
- Fields and hills along Burns Road

- Logo

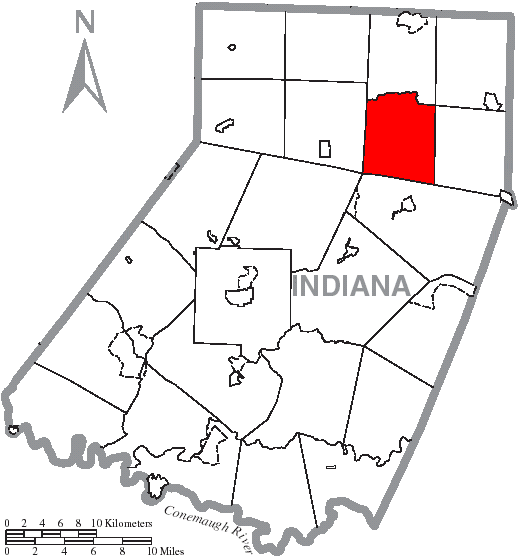
- Map of Indiana County, Pennsylvania Highlighting Grant Township

- Map of Pennsylvania highlighting Indiana County
- Country: United States
- State: Pennsylvania
- County: Indiana

Area
  - Total: 27.00 sq mi (69.94 km^{2})
  - Land: 26.95 sq mi (69.79 km^{2})
  - Water: 0.058 sq mi (0.15 km^{2})

Population (2020)
  - Total: 639 ▼
  - Estimate (2021): 636
  - Density: 26.1/sq mi (10.07/km^{2})
- Time zone: UTC-5 (Eastern (EST))
  - Summer (DST): UTC-4 (EDT)
- FIPS code: 42-063-30416
- Website: granttownshipsupervisors.com

Grant Township is a township in Indiana County, Pennsylvania, United States.

== History ==
Grant Township was formed when the eastern half of the original Mahoning Township was divided in 1868 and named after President Ulysses S. Grant. The township includes the unincorporated communities of Bald Ridge, Decker's Point (previously called Colfax), Doty's Round Top, East Run, Kinter Hill, Nashville, and Rochester Mills (previously called Richmond).

During the 1920s, the countryside of Grant Township was one of the few in Pennsylvania to have a woman, Grace Barr, appointed as a Rural Free Delivery carrier, delivering mail from the Rochester Mills Post Office.

== Geography ==
According to the United States Census Bureau, the township has a total area of 27.0 square miles (70 km^{2}), all land.

== Demographics ==
Historical population
Census	Pop.	Note	%±
1870	999		—
1880	1,318		31.9%
1890	1,350		2.4%
1900	1,285		−4.8%
1910	1,095		−14.8%
1920	975		−11.0%
1930	837		−14.2%
1940	929		11.0%
1950	863		−7.1%
1960	694		−19.6%
1970	637		−8.2%
1980	770		20.9%
1990	729		−5.3%
2000	696		−4.5%
2010	741		6.5%
2020	639		−13.8%
2021 (est.)	636		−0.5%
U.S. Decennial Census

The population was 639 at the 2020 census.

As of the census of 2000, there were 696 people, 279 households, and 195 families residing in the township. The population density was 25.8 inhabitants per square mile (10.0/km^{2}). There were 347 housing units at an average density of 12.9/sq mi (5.0/km^{2}). The racial makeup of the township was 99.57% White, 0.14% Native American, 0.14% Asian, and 0.14% from two or more races. Hispanic or Latino of any race were 0.29% of the population.

There were 279 households, out of which 30.5% had children under the age of 18 living with them, 58.8% were married couples living together, 6.8% had a female householder with no husband present, and 30.1% were non-families. 25.8% of all households were made up of individuals, and 15.1% had someone living alone who was 65 years of age or older. The average household size was 2.49 and the average family size was 3.01.

In the township the population was spread out, with 23.1% under the age of 18, 7.6% from 18 to 24, 28.0% from 25 to 44, 27.7% from 45 to 64, and 13.5% who were 65 years of age or older. The median age was 39 years. For every 100 females there were 110.3 males. For every 100 females age 18 and over, there were 105.8 males.

The median income for a household in the township was $27,500, and the median income for a family was $38,864. Males had a median income of $25,469 versus $16,346 for females. The per capita income for the township was $13,697. About 9.9% of families and 14.9% of the population were below the poverty line, including 23.3% of those under age 18 and 12.4% of those age 65 or over.
