= Linton Falls (Oregon) =

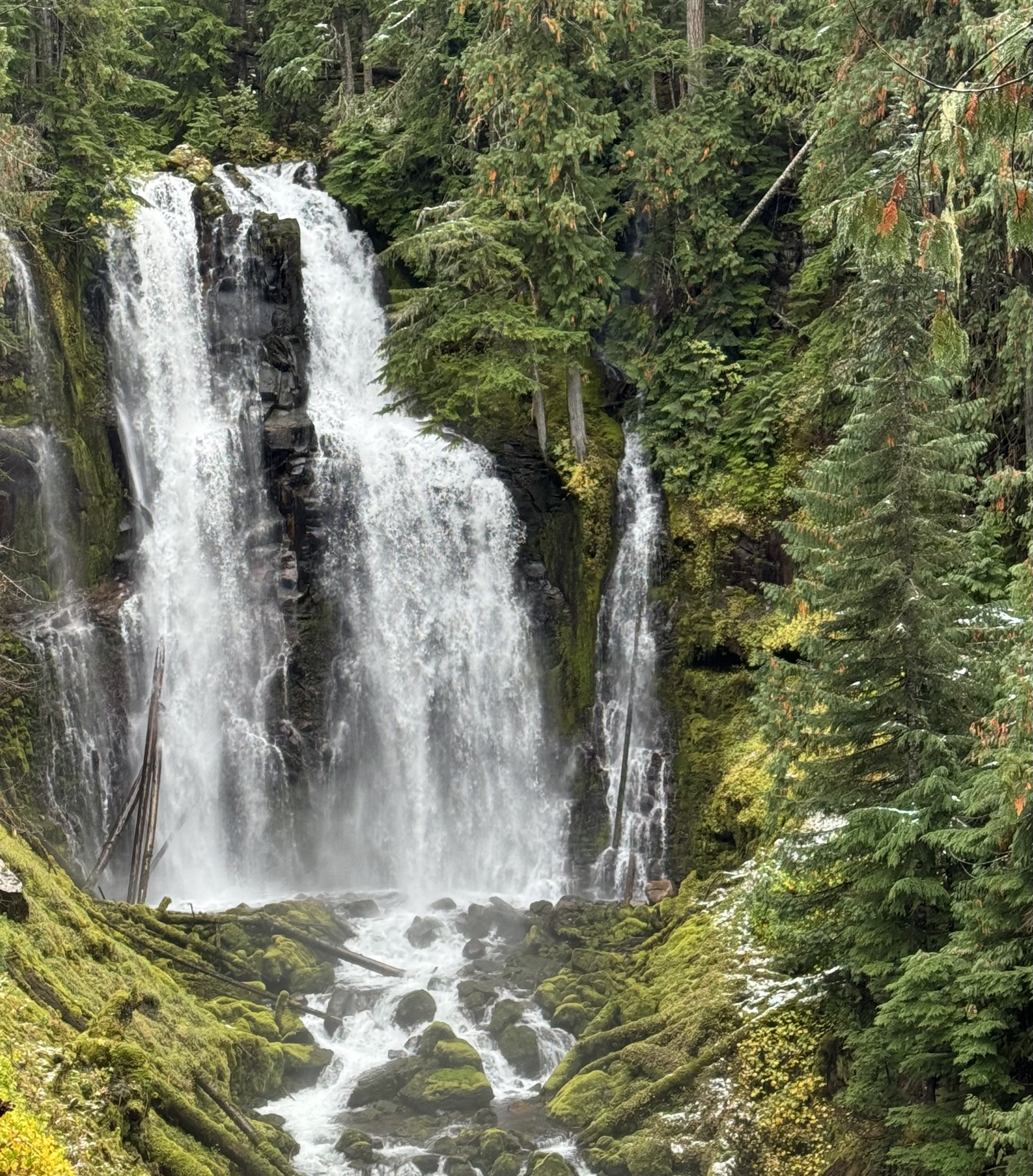
- Interactive map of Linton Falls
- Location: Three Sisters Wilderness
- Coordinates: 44.1598404°N 121.8866794°W
- Type: Staircase
- Elevation: 4,314 ft (1,315 m)
- Total height: 615 ft (187 m)
- Number of drops: 8
- Average flow rate: 150 cu ft/s (4 m^{3}/s)

Linton Falls, is a multi-step waterfall of 8 tiers located in the heart of the Three Sisters Wilderness, just east of the North Sister volcano on Oregon Route 242 in Lane County, in the U.S. state of Oregon. It totals 615 feet fall in eight drops, the tallest and last drop is 85 feet.

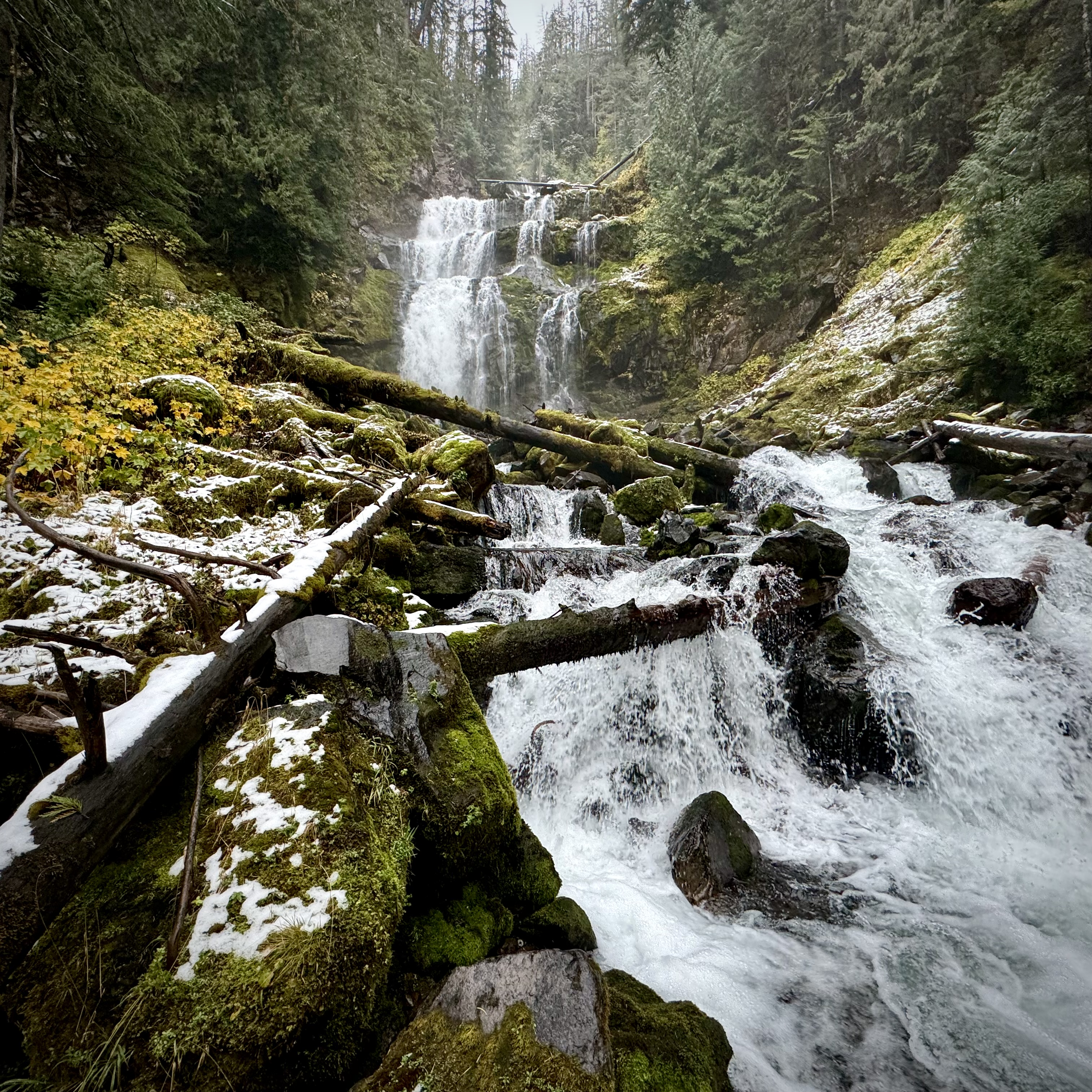

The waters of Linton Falls drain into the Linton Lake along the McKenzie Pass corridor and one of the main destinations along the Proxy Falls trailhead. Several unnamed waterfalls continue upstream until reaching Duncan Falls, approximately 1 mile from the Upper Linton tier.

Linton Falls has high sinuosity, frequent terraces, sloping terrains and is surrounded by thick forests, all of which makes it impossible to see in its entirety from a single view point. Past the Lower Linton Falls, the trek upstream is unmarked and mostly inaccessible.

== See also ==
- List of waterfalls in Oregon
