= Linton, Georgia =

Unincorporated community in Georgia, U.S.

Coordinates: 33°07′00″N 82°59′34″W

Linton is an unincorporated community in Hancock County, in the U.S. state of Georgia.

== History ==
A post office called Linton was established in 1860, and remained in operation until 1957. The community was named for Judge Linton Stephens, the brother of Georgia and Confederate politician Alexander H. Stephens.
