= Proxy Falls =

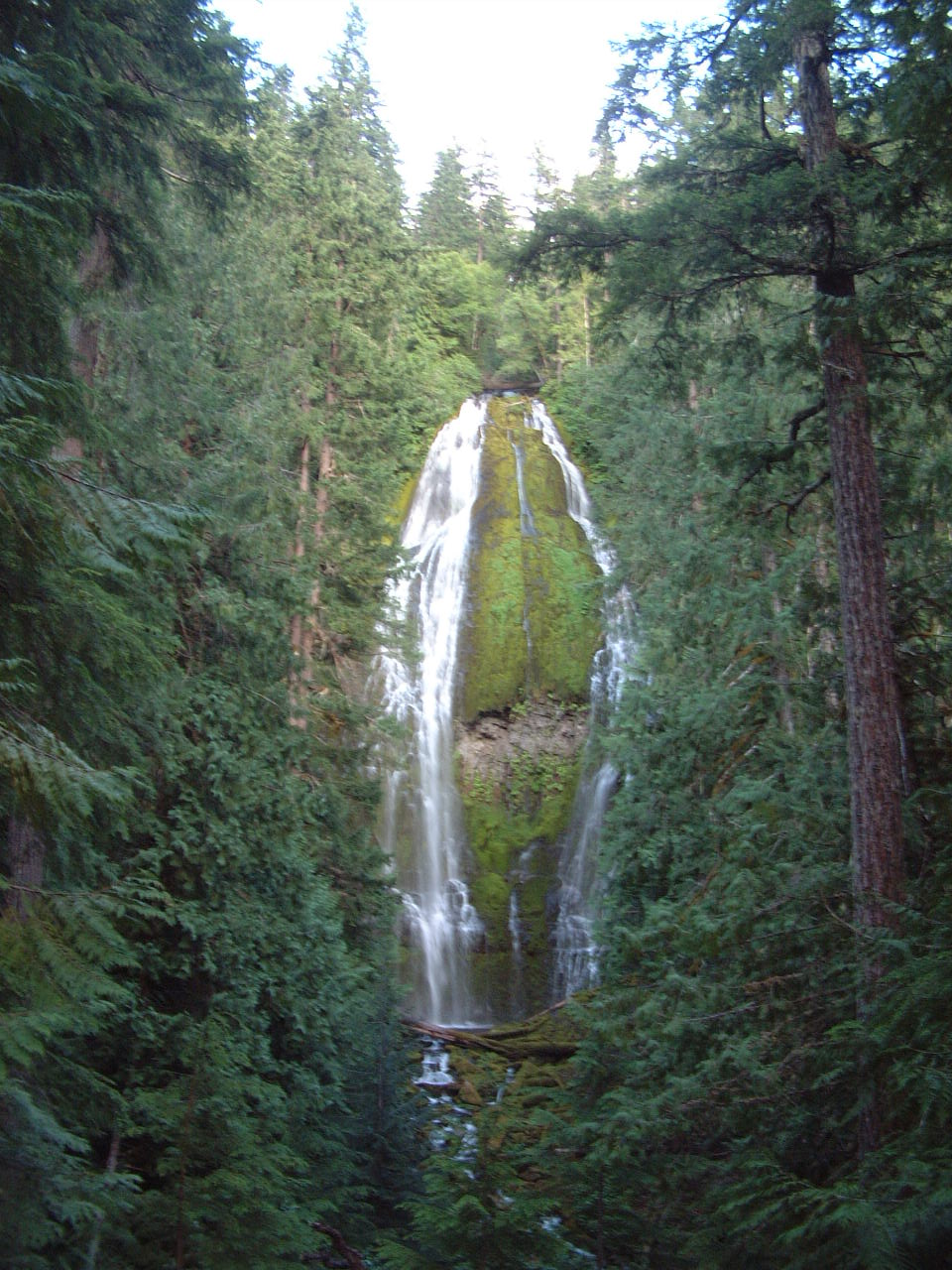
- Proxy Falls in the summer
- Interactive map of Proxy Falls
- Location: Lane County, Oregon
- Coordinates: 44.1616°N 121.92743°W
- Type: Cascade, Plunge
- Elevation: 3,286 ft (1,002 m)
- Total height: 226 ft (69 m)
- Number of drops: 1
- Average width: 60 ft (18 m)
- Average flow rate: 50 cu ft/s (1.4 m^{3}/s)

Proxy Falls, also known as Lower Proxy Falls, is a cascade and plunge waterfall from a collection of springs on the shoulder of North Sister, that plunges into a gaping canyon near McKenzie Pass in the Willamette National Forest, near Belknap Springs, Oregon. The waterfall is notable for its main drop of 226 feet (69 m) which makes it one of the highest plunge waterfalls in Oregon.

== Description ==
Proxy Falls formed at the end of a hanging valley created by the canyons cut by glaciers 6,000 years ago. Proxy Falls and its neighbor, Upper Proxy Falls, plummet off glacier-cut cliffs surrounded by lava fields from cinder cones near North Sister that filled the valley floor. The water plunges into porous subsoil and sinks underground, giving the impression that there is no outlet on the surface.

== Trails ==
An unpaved foot trail loops around lava fields and dense conifer forests with viewpoints to Proxy Falls and the smaller Upper Proxy Falls. It starts at the trailhead off highway 242 and totals 1.6 miles of easy hiking. The counterclockwise direction of the loop leads off to Proxy Falls, whereas on the opposite direction it leads to Upper Proxy Falls. Access to the base of Proxy Falls spins off the main trail and requires crossing Proxy River. Upper Proxy Falls stem from an unnamed river close to Proxy creek.

== See also ==
- List of waterfalls in Oregon
