= Linton Park (artist) =

American painter

- Born: 16 November 1826; Marion Center, Pennsylvania
- Died: 17 September 1906 (aged 79); Erie, Pennsylvania
- Occupation: Painter

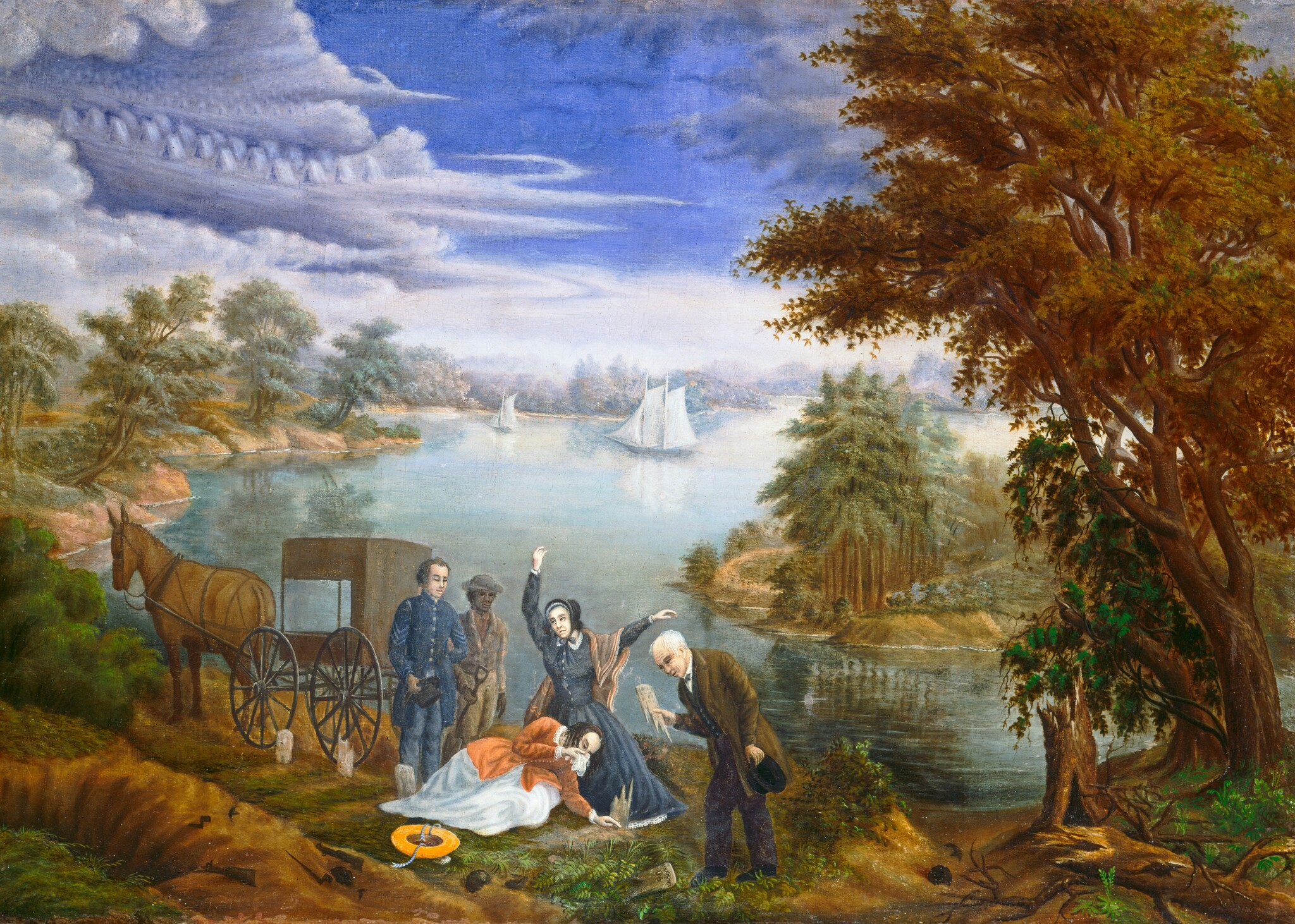
The Exhumation (formerly, The Burial)

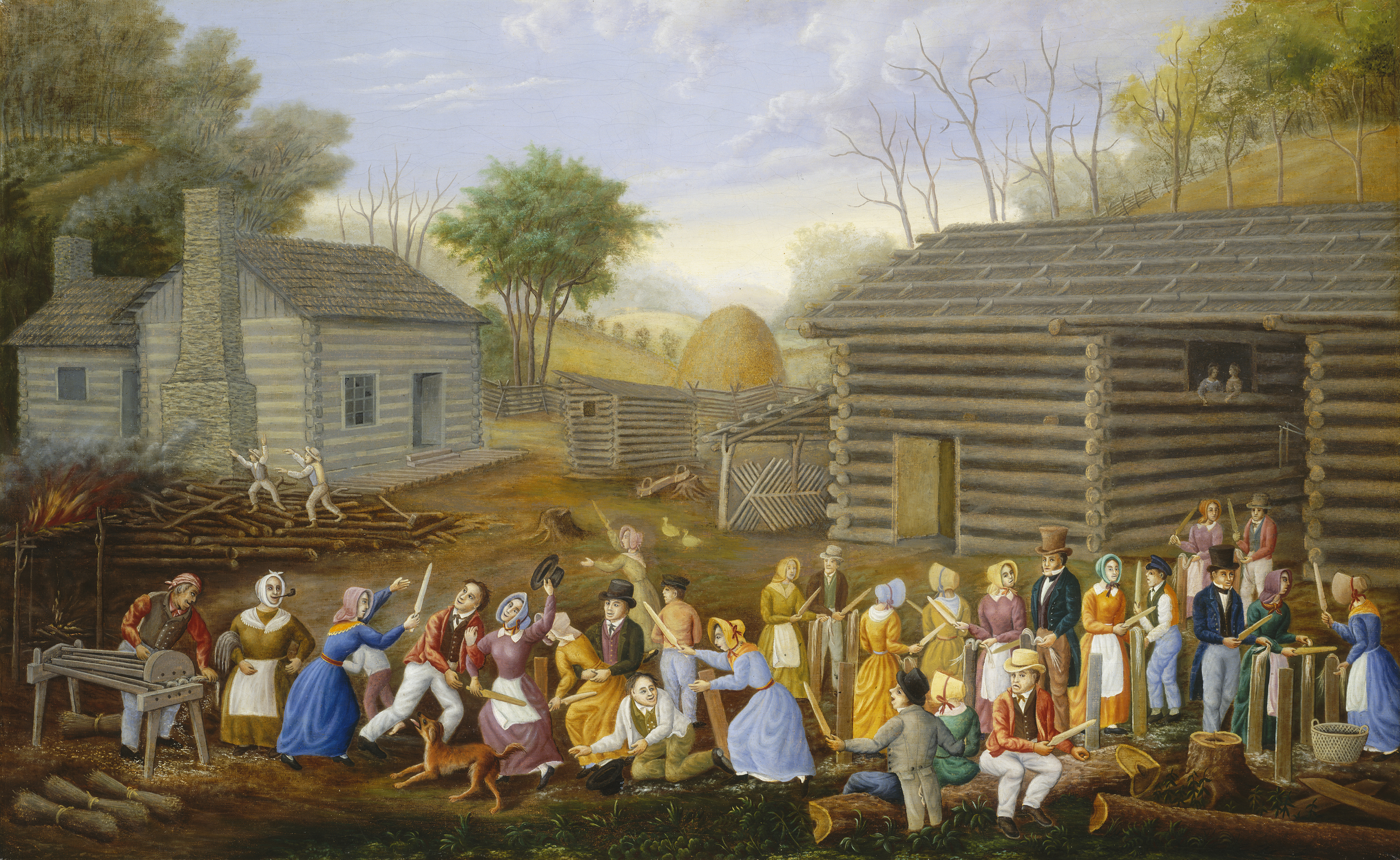
Flax Scutching Bee

Linton Park (16 November 1826, in Marion Center, Pennsylvania – 17 September 1906, in Erie, Pennsylvania) was an American painter in the Folk Art tradition and a vegetarian union soldier.

== Biography ==
His father was a surveyor who helped lay out his hometown. As a young man, he probably worked in his father's gristmill, although some of his paintings indicate that he may have worked in the lumber industry as well. After travelling throughout Pennsylvania in the 1850s, the year 1863 found him in Washington, D.C., where he may have worked on the new United States Capitol dome. The following year, he enlisted in the Union Army and was assigned to the Presidential Guard detail. He was honorably discharged in 1865 and received a thank you note from President Lincoln, which he reportedly had buried with him.

Apparently, he held some sort of government job until 1868, when he returned to his hometown. He would spend the rest of his life there. Later, he and a brother opened a planing mill, which was financially quite successful. At that time, the City Directory listed him as a painter and it is likely that he mostly painted signs, wagons and furniture. Known for his eccentric personality and odd behavior, he lived as something of a recluse and never married.

He was also an amateur inventor. In 1873, he patented "improved ventilating blinds" which bear a resemblance to modern venetian blinds. They were later awarded first prize at the Centennial Exposition. His other inventions include a hat rack, a "feather renovator" for cleaning the stuffing in pillows and mattresses, and a vegetable peeler (he was a lifelong vegetarian). An advertisement from 1876 indicates that he made "house decorations", probably of an architectural nature, and picture frames.

No record of any formal artistic training exists, and it appears that he did not begin painting individual pictures until late in life; possibly after he retired. His best known work, the "Flax Scutching Bee", dates from 1885 and the above-mentioned logging pictures may come from the 1890s. He is also said to have created a picture of the Johnstown Flood, the proceeds from which would benefit the survivors, but its whereabouts are unknown.

In 1904, a fire at a makeshift studio he had set up in an old creamery destroyed most of his belongings. After that, he moved into an old soldiers' home in Erie, where he died two years later. The number of paintings lost in the fire (if any) is unknown, but only thirteen paintings are definitely known to be his. Six of those are painted on the bed ticking.

== Vegetarianism ==
Park was a lifelong vegetarian and adhered to the diet through the American Civil War as a soldier in Company F of the 2nd District of Columbia Infantry Regiment. He requested vegetarian food as the US Army were given beef and pork rations. Linton stated that he could not eat any animal food or food that had been contaminated with meat, as it was opposed to his digestive functions and all his senses. Park managed to obtain vegetarian food from a sutler but this was not always available to him so he requested "some special accommodation or to draw an extra allowance of bread or other vegetable elements in lieu of the animal food." Park remained a vegetarian throughout his life and his dietary restrictions during the civil war were cited in a newspaper article in 1906 which noted that "while he could assimilate everything connected with his answer to the call of duty from the stand of patriotism, he could not assimilate the army pork."
