= Hancock County, Georgia =

County in Georgia, United States

- County
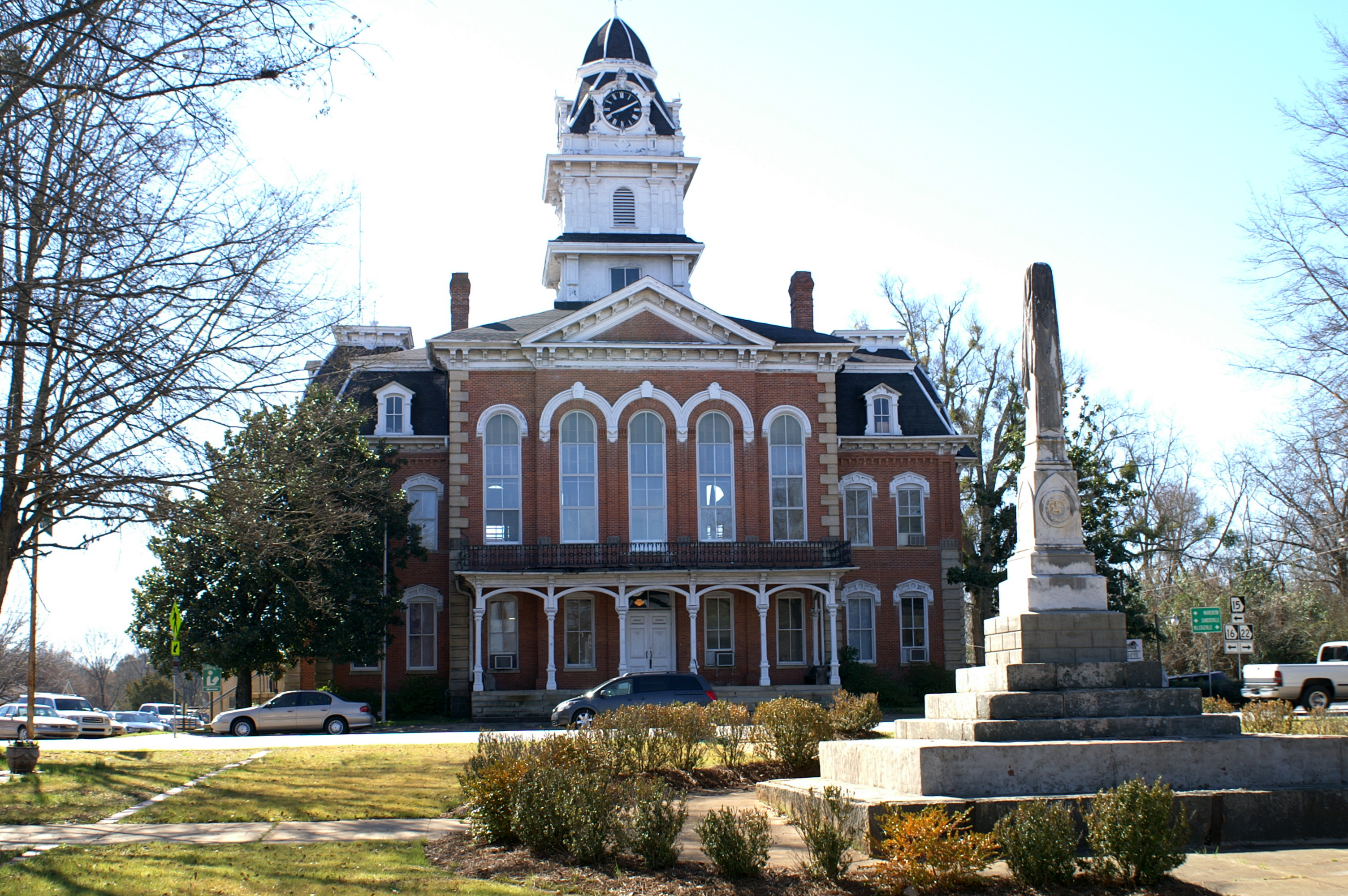
- Hancock County Courthouse and Confederate Monument in Sparta

- Location within the U.S. state of Georgia
- Coordinates: 33°16′N 83°00′W
- Country: United States
- State: Georgia
- Founded: December 17, 1793; 232 years ago
- Named for: John Hancock
- Seat: Sparta
- Largest city: Sparta

Area
  - Total: 479 sq mi (1,240 km^{2})
  - Land: 472 sq mi (1,220 km^{2})
  - Water: 6.8 sq mi (18 km^{2}) 1.4%

Population (2020)
  - Total: 8,735
  - Estimate (2025): 8,682 ▼
  - Density: 19/sq mi (7.3/km^{2})
- Time zone: UTC−5 (Eastern)
  - Summer (DST): UTC−4 (EDT)
- Congressional district: 10th
- Website: www.hancockcountyga.gov

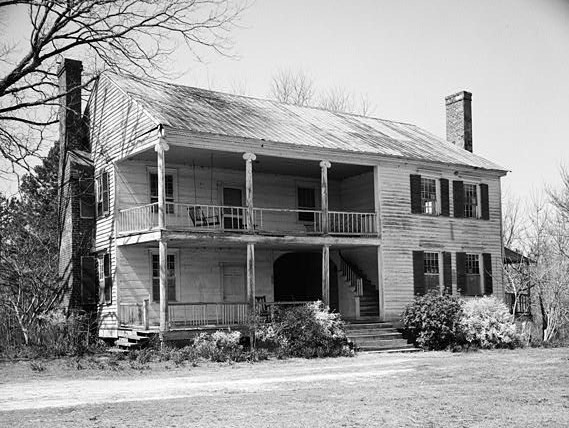
Thomas Cheely House, ca. 1825

Hancock County is a county located in the East Central part of the U.S. state of Georgia. As of the 2020 census, the population was 8,735. The county seat is Sparta. The county was created on December 17, 1793, and named for John Hancock, a Founding Father of the American Revolution.

== History ==
Before the Civil War, Hancock County was developed for cotton plantations, as international demand was high for the commodity. The land was developed and the cotton cultivated and processed by thousands of enslaved African Americans. This area is classified as part of the Black Belt of the United States, primarily due to its fertile soil. It was later also associated with the slave society. Enslaved persons made up 61% of the total county population in the 1850 Census. Unusually for such a plantation-dominated society, the county's representatives at the Georgia Secession Convention, who were overwhelmingly white and Democratic, voted against secession in 1861.

But the secession conventions were dominated by men who voted for separation, and Georgia soon seceded and entered the war.

After the war, the freed black population predominated by number in the county for decades. After emancipation and granting of citizenship and the franchise, most freedmen joined the Republican Party, which they credited with gaining their freedom. Conservative white Democrats resisted political domination by blacks, although they were outnumbered. In the later years of Reconstruction, whites used violence, intimidation and fraud to suppress black voting. In 1908 the white-dominated legislature passed an amendment that effectively disenfranchised most black voters and many poor whites ones.

== Geography ==
According to the U.S. Census Bureau, the county has a total area of 479 square miles (1,240 km^{2}), of which 472 square miles (1,220 km^{2}) is land and 6.8 square miles (18 km^{2}) (1.4%) is water.

The western portion of Hancock County, which is defined by a line running southeast from White Plains to the intersection of State Route 22 and Springfield Road, then running southwest along State Route 22, is located in the Upper Oconee River sub-basin of the Altamaha River basin. The southern portion of the county, defined by a triangle made of State Route 22 and State Route 15, with Sparta at its apex, is located in the Lower Oconee River sub-basin of the same Altamaha River basin. The northeastern portion of Hancock County is located in the Upper Ogeechee River sub-basin of the Ogeechee River basin.

=== Major highways ===
No Interstate Highway

- State Route 248
- State Route 15
- State Route 16
- State Route 22
- State Route 77

=== Adjacent counties ===
- Taliaferro County - north
- Warren County - northeast
- Glascock County - east
- Washington County - southeast
- Baldwin County - southwest
- Putnam County - west
- Greene County - northwest

== Communities ==
=== City ===
- Sparta (county seat)

=== Unincorporated communities ===
- Culverton
- Devereux
- Jewell
- Mayfield

== Demographics ==
Historical population
Census	Pop.	Note	%±
1800	14,456		—
1810	13,330		−7.8%
1820	12,734		−4.5%
1830	11,820		−7.2%
1840	9,659		−18.3%
1850	11,578		19.9%
1860	12,044		4.0%
1870	11,317		−6.0%
1880	16,989		50.1%
1890	17,149		0.9%
1900	18,277		6.6%
1910	19,189		5.0%
1920	18,357		−4.3%
1930	13,070		−28.8%
1940	12,764		−2.3%
1950	11,052		−13.4%
1960	9,979		−9.7%
1970	9,019		−9.6%
1980	9,466		5.0%
1990	8,908		−5.9%
2000	10,076		13.1%
2010	9,429		−6.4%
2020	8,735		−7.4%
2025 (est.)	8,682	▼	−0.6%
U.S. Decennial Census; 1790-1880 1890-1910; 1920-1930 1930-1940; 1940-1950 1960-1980; 1980-2000 2010 2020

=== Racial and ethnic composition ===
Hancock County, Georgia – Racial and ethnic composition Note: the US Census treats Hispanic/Latino as an ethnic category. This table excludes Latinos from the racial categories and assigns them to a separate category. Hispanics/Latinos may be of any race.
Race / Ethnicity (NH = Non-Hispanic)	Pop 1980	Pop 1990	Pop 2000	Pop 2010	Pop 2020	% 1980	% 1990	% 2000	% 2010	% 2020
White alone (NH)	2,052	1,789	2,141	2,212	2,413	21.68%	20.08%	21.25%	23.46%	27.62%
Black or African American alone (NH)	7,238	7,038	7,820	6,959	6,025	76.46%	79.01%	77.61%	73.80%	68.98%
Native American or Alaska Native alone (NH)	0	6	16	21	23	0.00%	0.07%	0.16%	0.22%	0.26%
Asian alone (NH)	4	0	9	47	37	0.04%	0.00%	0.09%	0.50%	0.42%
Native Hawaiian or Pacific Islander alone (NH)	x	x	0	1	1	x	x	0.00%	0.01%	0.01%
Other race alone (NH)	2	12	2	0	10	0.02%	0.13%	0.02%	0.00%	0.11%
Mixed race or Multiracial (NH)	x	x	34	50	163	x	x	0.34%	0.53%	1.87%
Hispanic or Latino (any race)	170	63	54	139	63	1.80%	0.71%	0.54%	1.47%	0.72%
Total	9,466	8,908	10,076	9,429	8,735	100.00%	100.00%	100.00%	100.00%	100.00%

=== 2020 census ===
As of the 2020 census, the county had a population of 8,735, 3,298 households, and 1,755 families. The median age was 48.0 years. 14.3% of residents were under the age of 18 and 23.6% of residents were 65 years of age or older. For every 100 females there were 121.8 males, and for every 100 females age 18 and over there were 125.7 males age 18 and over. 0.0% of residents lived in urban areas, while 100.0% lived in rural areas.

The racial makeup of the county was 27.7% White, 69.0% Black or African American, 0.3% American Indian and Alaska Native, 0.4% Asian, 0.0% Native Hawaiian and Pacific Islander, 0.3% from some other race, and 2.3% from two or more races. Hispanic or Latino residents of any race comprised 0.7% of the population.

Of those households, 22.4% had children under the age of 18 living with them and 35.6% had a female householder with no spouse or partner present. About 32.8% of all households were made up of individuals and 15.7% had someone living alone who was 65 years of age or older.

There were 4,896 housing units, of which 32.6% were vacant. Among occupied housing units, 75.4% were owner-occupied and 24.6% were renter-occupied. The homeowner vacancy rate was 1.5% and the rental vacancy rate was 9.6%.

== Politics ==
Hancock County has been one of the most consistently Democratic counties in the entire nation since the Civil War. However, the composition of the party voters and policies they support have undergone major changes since the late twentieth century, switching from whites to African Americans.

The majority of county voters have voted for the Democratic presidential nominee in every election since 1852 except that of 1972, when George McGovern lost every county in Georgia. McGovern did perform better here than elsewhere in the state, losing by only 93 votes. Apart from Richard Nixon in that election, Barry Goldwater in 1964 was one of only two Republicans since at least 1912 to gain 30 percent of the county's vote. That year, most of the county's African-American majority was still largely disenfranchised and could not vote at all. The conservative white minority favored Goldwater because its traditional Democratic loyalties had frayed. In 2024, Donald Trump also managed to break 30% of the vote, the strongest showing for a Republican since 1972.

In 1980, Hancock County gave "favorite son" candidate Jimmy Carter his second highest vote share in the nation. In 1984, it supported Walter Mondale, who won more than 76.6 percent of Hancock County ballots, making it his fourth-best county outside the District of Columbia. He was otherwise within 3,819 votes of losing all fifty states.

For elections to the United States House of Representatives, Hancock County is part of Georgia's 10th congressional district, currently represented by Mike Collins. For elections to the Georgia State Senate, Hancock County is part of District 26. For elections to the Georgia House of Representatives, Hancock County is part of District 128.

United States presidential election results for Hancock County, Georgia
Year	Republican		Democratic		Third party(ies)	
Year	No.	%	No.	%	No.	%
1912	13	2.16%	549	91.35%	39	6.49%
1916	30	4.89%	562	91.53%	22	3.58%
1920	53	9.62%	498	90.38%	0	0.00%
1924	22	7.14%	272	88.31%	14	4.55%
1928	118	17.61%	552	82.39%	0	0.00%
1932	18	3.27%	529	96.01%	4	0.73%
1936	57	10.00%	504	88.42%	9	1.58%
1940	153	23.36%	501	76.49%	1	0.15%
1944	109	22.29%	380	77.71%	0	0.00%
1948	111	14.38%	441	57.12%	220	28.50%
1952	267	17.66%	1,245	82.34%	0	0.00%
1956	354	29.16%	860	70.84%	0	0.00%
1960	286	26.83%	780	73.17%	0	0.00%
1964	925	46.27%	1,074	53.73%	0	0.00%
1968	381	10.44%	2,165	59.32%	1,104	30.25%
1972	1,595	51.50%	1,502	48.50%	0	0.00%
1976	651	23.52%	2,117	76.48%	0	0.00%
1980	573	20.40%	2,205	78.50%	31	1.10%
1984	644	23.39%	2,109	76.61%	0	0.00%
1988	621	23.99%	1,947	75.20%	21	0.81%
1992	506	16.03%	2,461	77.95%	190	6.02%
1996	438	16.55%	2,135	80.69%	73	2.76%
2000	662	21.45%	2,414	78.22%	10	0.32%
2004	822	23.12%	2,715	76.37%	18	0.51%
2008	795	18.28%	3,535	81.30%	18	0.41%
2012	769	18.80%	3,308	80.88%	13	0.32%
2016	843	23.49%	2,701	75.28%	44	1.23%
2020	1,154	27.79%	2,976	71.66%	23	0.55%
2024	1,364	32.17%	2,864	67.55%	12	0.28%

United States Senate election results for Hancock County, Georgia2
Year	Republican		Democratic		Third party(ies)	
Year	No.	%	No.	%	No.	%
2020	1,173	28.63%	2,858	69.76%	66	1.61%
2020	1,061	27.66%	2,775	72.34%	0	0.00%

United States Senate election results for Hancock County, Georgia3
Year	Republican		Democratic		Third party(ies)	
Year	No.	%	No.	%	No.	%
2020	608	14.87%	2,129	52.07%	1,352	33.06%
2020	1,058	27.57%	2,780	72.43%	0	0.00%
2022	989	29.16%	2,373	69.96%	30	0.88%
2022	910	27.86%	2,356	72.14%	0	0.00%

Georgia Gubernatorial election results for Hancock County
Year	Republican		Democratic		Third party(ies)	
Year	No.	%	No.	%	No.	%
2022	1,073	31.54%	2,313	67.99%	16	0.47%

== Education ==
Public education is offered by the Hancock County School District.

== Notable people ==
- James Abercrombie, former United States Representative from Alabama
- Amanda America Dickson, noted African-American heiress and socialite
- Harvey Grant, professional basketball player
- Horace Grant, professional basketball player
- William Henry Harrison, Georgia state legislator
- Tommy "Hurricane" Jackson, professional boxer
- Biddy Mason, nurse and entrepreneur, co-founder of First African Methodist Episcopal Church of Los Angeles
- Hiram Runnels, former Governor of Mississippi
- William Terrell, former United States Representative

== See also ==
- Central Savannah River Area
- National Register of Historic Places listings in Hancock County, Georgia
- Glen Mary Plantation
- List of counties in Georgia
