= Sparta, Georgia =

- City
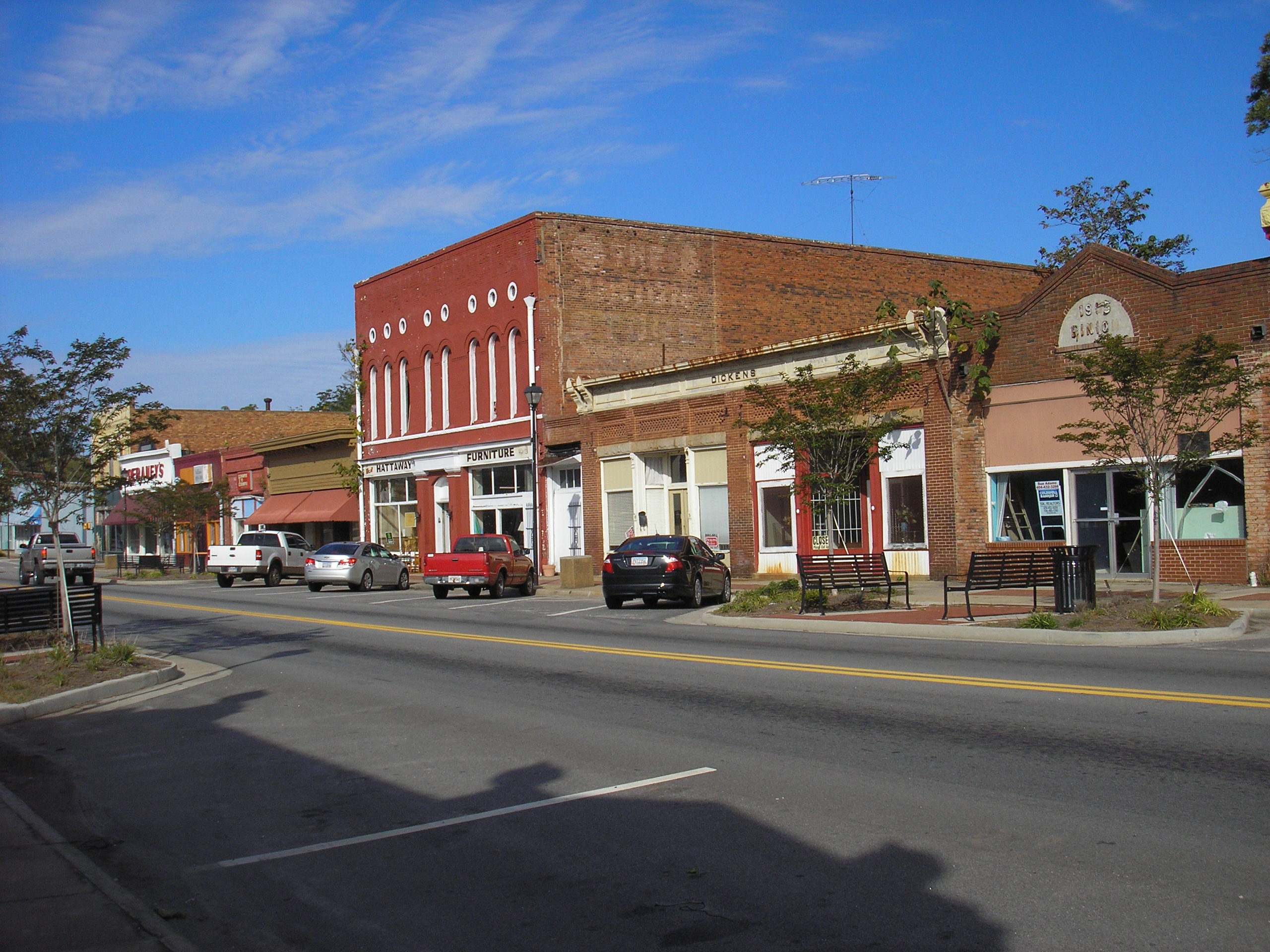
- Sparta Historic District

- Location in Hancock County and the state of Georgia
- Coordinates: 33°17′N 82°58′W
- Country: United States
- State: Georgia
- County: Hancock
- Established: December 5, 1805

Area
  - Total: 1.82 sq mi (4.72 km^{2})
  - Land: 1.81 sq mi (4.69 km^{2})
  - Water: 0.012 sq mi (0.03 km^{2})

Population (2020)
  - Total: 1,357
  - Density: 749.2/sq mi (289.27/km^{2})
- Time zone: UTC-5 (Eastern (EST))
  - Summer (DST): UTC-4 (EDT)
- ZIP code: 31087
- Area code: 706
- FIPS code: 13-72584
- GNIS feature ID: 0323330
- Website: www.cityofsparta.org

Sparta is a city in and the county seat of Hancock County, Georgia, United States. The city's population was 1,357 at the 2020 census.

== History ==
Sparta was founded in 1795 in the newly formed Hancock County. It became the county seat in 1797, was incorporated as a town in 1805, and later as a city in 1893. The community was named after Sparta, a city-state in Ancient Greece.

In 1864, during Sherman's March to the Sea, the town remained completely unscathed, reportedly due to the efforts of Confederate Captain Henry Culver, the son-in-law of local industrialist William Fraley, who successfully diverted Union troops away from the area.

== Geography ==
According to the United States Census Bureau, the city has a total area of 1.8 square miles (4.7 km^{2}), all land.

=== Major highways ===
- State Route 15
- State Route 16
- State Route 22

== Demographics ==
Historical population
Census	Pop.	Note	%±
1880	848		—
1890	1,540		81.6%
1900	1,150		−25.3%
1910	1,715		49.1%
1920	1,895		10.5%
1930	1,613		−14.9%
1940	1,872		16.1%
1950	1,954		4.4%
1960	1,921		−1.7%
1970	2,172		13.1%
1980	1,754		−19.2%
1990	1,710		−2.5%
2000	1,522		−11.0%
2010	1,400		−8.0%
2020	1,357		−3.1%
U.S. Decennial Census; 1850-1870 1870-1880; 1890-1910 1920-1930; 1940 1950 1960; 1970 1980 1990; 2000 2010

=== 2020 census ===
As of the 2020 census, Sparta had a population of 1,357. The median age was 49.0 years. 18.9% of residents were under the age of 18 and 24.8% of residents were 65 years of age or older. For every 100 females there were 90.6 males, and for every 100 females age 18 and over there were 88.9 males age 18 and over.

0.0% of residents lived in urban areas, while 100.0% lived in rural areas.

There were 546 households in Sparta, of which 26.9% had children under the age of 18 living in them. Of all households, 25.1% were married-couple households, 24.7% were households with a male householder and no spouse or partner present, and 44.3% were households with a female householder and no spouse or partner present. About 38.1% of all households were made up of individuals and 16.9% had someone living alone who was 65 years of age or older.

There were 651 housing units, of which 16.1% were vacant. The homeowner vacancy rate was 2.0% and the rental vacancy rate was 5.9%.

Racial composition as of the 2020 census
Race	Number	Percent
White	189	13.9%
Black or African American	1,116	82.2%
American Indian and Alaska Native	1	0.1%
Asian	23	1.7%
Native Hawaiian and Other Pacific Islander	0	0.0%
Some other race	0	0.0%
Two or more races	28	2.1%
Hispanic or Latino (of any race)	11	0.8%

== Economy ==
Sparta is the site of Georgia's Hancock State Prison.

== Education ==
=== Hancock County School District ===
The Hancock County School District holds pre-school to grade twelve, and consists of one elementary school, a middle school, and a high school. The district has 83 full-time teachers and over 670 students.

- Lewis Elementary School
- Hancock Central Middle School
- Hancock Central High School
- John Hancock Academy

== Notable people ==
- Thomas "Pee Wee" Butts – professional baseball player
- George Darden – United States Representative from Georgia who went to high school in Sparta
- Harvey Grant – professional basketball player
- Horace Grant – professional basketball player
- Tommy Hurricane Jackson – professional boxer
- Adella Hunt Logan – suffragist
- Jean Toomer – Harlem Renaissance writer and poet, once served as a principal in Sparta
- Angeria Paris VanMicheals – drag queen and finalist on season 14 of RuPaul's Drag Race and winner of the ninth season of RuPaul's Drag Race All Stars.

== See also ==
- Central Savannah River Area
- Rossiter-Little House - Oldest house in Sparta
