= Lovatt =

Lovatt is a surname. Notable people with the surname include:

- Harry Lovatt (1905–1984), much-travelled English footballer
- Mark Lovatt (born 1971), British road racing cyclist
- Paul Lovatt-Cooper, "Composer in Association" of the Black Dyke Band
- Stephen Lovatt (born 1964), New Zealand actor, plays Max Hoyland on the Australian soap Neighbours
- Tom Lovatt-Williams (1897–1986), English poet and writer about railways and nature topics
- George I. Lovatt, Sr. (1872–1958), US cathedral architect

== See also ==
- Lovat (disambiguation)
- Lovato
- Lovett (disambiguation)
