= South Georgia (region) =

Coordinates: 32°0′N 82°30′W

- Region
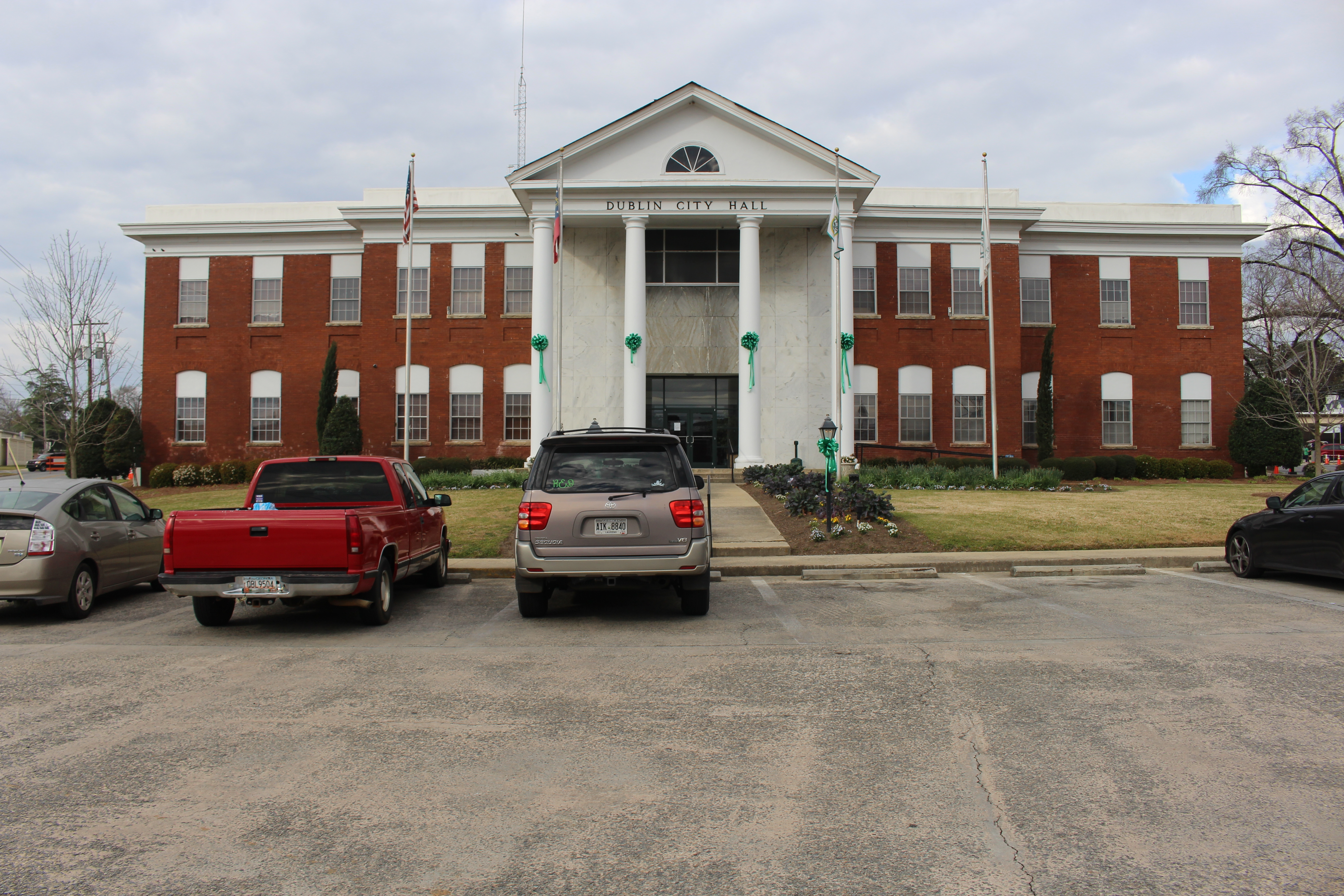
- Dublin City Hall

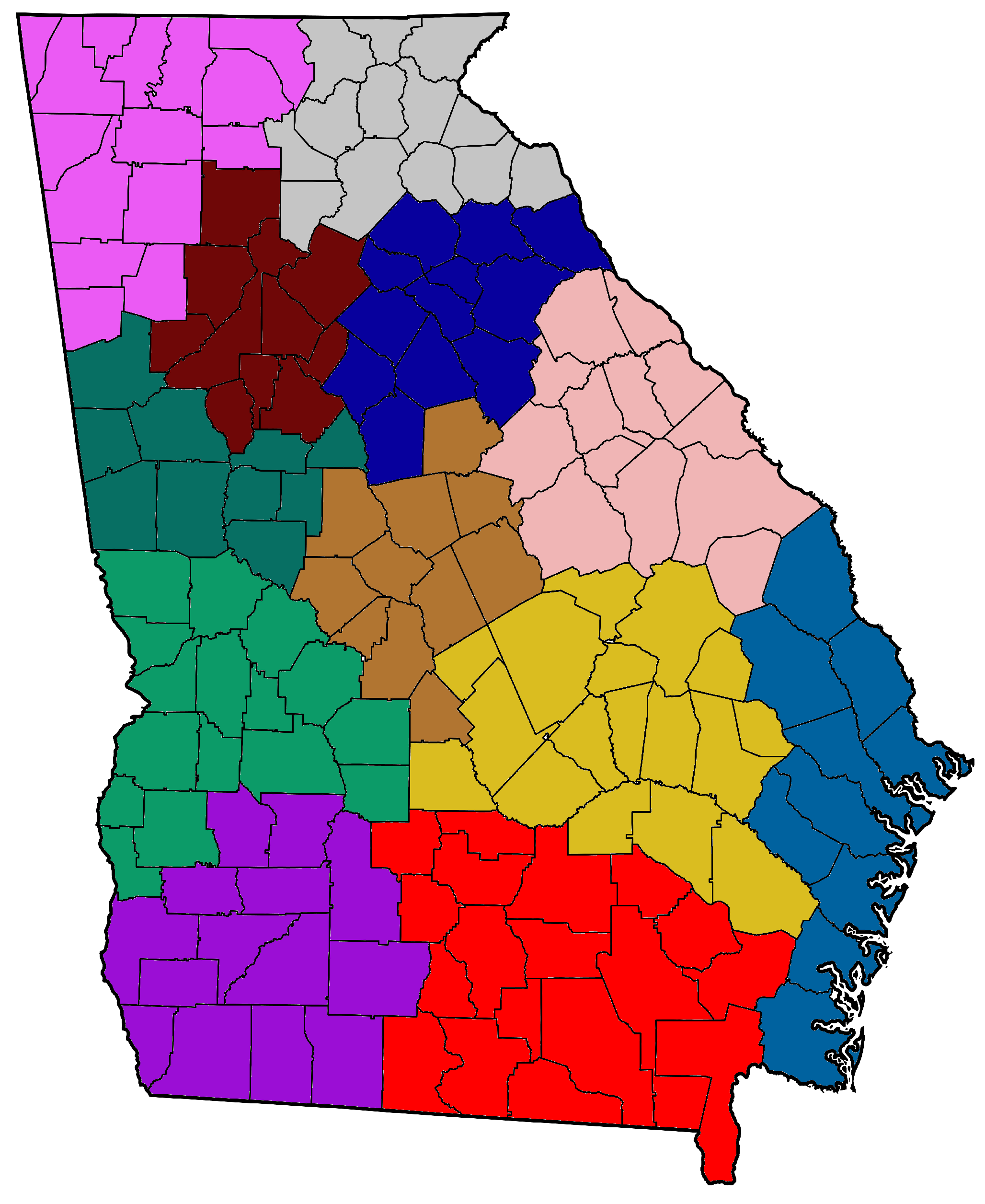
- South Georgia highlighted in gold

- Location of Georgia within the United States
- Country: United States
- State: Georgia

Population (2020)
  - Total: 292,759
- Demonym: South Georgian
- Website: georgia.org/regions/central-east-georgia

South Georgia is a seventeen-county region in the U.S. state of Georgia, with a 2020 population of 292,759. The most populated county in the region is Laurens County, which had a 2020 census population of 49,570. The Dublin micropolitan area had a population of 65,903 in 2020.

== Geography ==
South Georgia, according to the Georgia Department of Economic Development, consists of the following counties: Appling, Bleckley, Candler, Dodge, Emanuel, Evans, Jeff Davis, Johnson, Laurens, Montgomery, Tattnall, Telfair, Toombs, Treutlen, Wayne, Wheeler, and Wilcox.

== Demographics ==
Tabulating South Georgia's counties according to the 2020 U.S. census, the region had a population of 292,950, making it one of Georgia's least-populated regions statewide.

In terms of religious affiliation, Christianity is the largest religion in South Georgia. According to the Association of Religion Data Archives in 2020, Baptists formed the largest Christian tradition for the region, being part of the Bible Belt. The largest Christian denominations were the Southern Baptist Convention, United Methodist Church, Church of God (Cleveland, Tennessee), National Missionary Baptist Convention of America, and the Catholic Church in the United States. Overall, non-denominational Protestants were the second-largest collective Christian tradition in South Georgia.

Non-Christian religions accounted for a minority in South Georgia, with Buddhism being the second-largest religion, followed by the Baha'i Faith.

== Economy ==
The South Georgia region's economy is primarily stimulated by agriculture and Southeastern Technical College.

== Transportation ==
- Interstate 16
