= Leavitt =

Leavitt may refer to:

== People ==
- Leavitt (surname)

== Places ==
United States

- Leavitt, California
- Leavitt Lake, a lake in Minnesota
- Leavitt Peak, California
- Leavitt Township, Michigan
- Leavittsburg, Ohio
- Leavittstown, New Hampshire, name later changed to Effingham, New Hampshire

Canada

- Leavitt, Alberta

Extraterrestrial

- Leavitt (crater)
- 5383 Leavitt, asteroid

== Structures ==
United States

- Leavitt Area High School, Turner, Maine
- Blazo-Leavitt House, Parsonsfield, Maine
- James Leavitt House, Waterboro Center, Maine
- Thomas Leavitt House, Bunkerville, Nevada

== See also ==
- Levett
- Lovett (disambiguation)
