= 1932 United States presidential election in Georgia =

- November 8, 1932

| Nominee | Franklin D. Roosevelt | Herbert Hoover |
| Party | Democratic | Republican |
| Home state | New York | California |
| Running mate | John Nance Garner | Charles Curtis |
| Electoral vote | 12 | 0 |
| Popular vote | 234,118 | 19,863 |
| Percentage | 91.60% | 7.77% |
County results
Roosevelt
60–70%
80–90%
90–100%
Hoover
50–60%
President before election
Herbert Hoover
Republican
Elected President
Franklin Roosevelt
Democratic

The 1932 United States presidential election in Georgia took place on November 8, 1932, as part of the 1932 United States presidential election. Voters chose 12 representatives, or electors, to the Electoral College, who voted for president and vice president.

With the exception of a handful of historically Unionist North Georgia counties – chiefly Fannin but also to a lesser extent Pickens, Gilmer and Towns – Georgia since the 1880s had been a one-party state dominated by the Democratic Party. Disfranchisement of almost all African-Americans and most poor whites had made the Republican Party virtually nonexistent outside of local governments in those few hill counties, and the national Democratic Party served as the guardian of white supremacy against a Republican Party historically associated with memories of Reconstruction. The only competitive elections were Democratic primaries, which state laws restricted to whites on the grounds of the Democratic Party being legally a private club.

The previous election of 1928 had seen many Protestant ministers in this state stand strongly opposed to Catholic Democratic nominee Al Smith, with the result that Republican candidate Herbert Hoover was able to gain considerable support in the largely white but secessionist upcountry. However, unlike in Alabama, where Hoover nearly carried the state due to the Alabama U.S. Senator James Thomas Heflin supporting him over Smith, in Georgia no local Democrats supported Hoover.

The onset of the Great Depression completely destroyed any hope of building on the gains from anti-Catholicism and growing urban middle class presidential Republican voting which had been seen since 1920. In fact, Hoover fell far below typical Republican percentages from before the 1920s, and Roosevelt won more than ninety percent of ballots in Georgia as a whole and in all but twenty-two of the state's 159 counties. His performance is the best in Georgia by any presidential candidates since Andrew Jackson won the state uncontested exactly a century previously. Despite this landslide victory, Georgia was the only Deep South state in which Hoover carried any counties.

== Results ==
1932 United States presidential election in Georgia
| Party | Candidate | Votes | Percentage | Electoral votes |
|---|---|---|---|---|
| Democratic | Franklin D. Roosevelt | 234,118 | 91.60% | 12 |
| Republican | Herbert Hoover (incumbent) | 19,863 | 7.77% | 0 |
| Prohibition | William Upshaw | 1,125 | 0.44% | 0 |
| Socialist | Norman Thomas | 461 | 0.18% | 0 |
| Communist | William Foster | 23 | 0.01% | 0 |

=== Results by congressional districts ===
State at-large
| Candidate | Party | Votes | % |
|---|---|---|---|
| Cam D. Dorsey | Democratic Party | 234,118 | 45.81 |
| Mrs. Oscar McKenzie | Democratic Party | 234,058 | 45.79 |
| I. H. Pitts | Republican Party | 19,863 | 3.89 |
| Bertha M. Field | Republican Party | 19,859 | 3.89 |
| R. E. L. Whitworth | Prohibition Party | 1,125 | 0.22 |
| Luther E. Mann | Prohibition Party | 1,125 | 0.22 |
| Sara D. Halley | Socialist Party of America | 461 | 0.09 |
| C. H. Simpson | Socialist Party of America | 461 | 0.09 |
| Stonewall Jackson Leathers | Communist Party | 23 | 0.00 |
| Frances E. Leathers | Communist Party | 23 | 0.00 |
| Total | | 511,116 | 100.00 |

1st congressional district
| Candidate | Party | Votes | % |
|---|---|---|---|
| H. P. Smith | Democratic Party | 234,100 | 91.61 |
| Mrs. C. C. Mordecai | Republican Party | 19,849 | 7.77 |
| George S. Austin | Prohibition Party | 1,125 | 0.44 |
| Henry Applebaum | Socialist Party of America | 461 | 0.18 |
| Total | | 255,535 | 100.00 |

2nd congressional district
| Candidate | Party | Votes | % |
|---|---|---|---|
| W. J. Crowe | Democratic Party | 233,963 | 91.62 |
| O. W. Pidcock | Republican Party | 19,827 | 7.76 |
| E. G. Jolly | Prohibition Party | 1,125 | 0.44 |
| W. J. Lewis | Socialist Party of America | 461 | 0.18 |
| Total | | 255,376 | 100.00 |

3rd congressional district
| Candidate | Party | Votes | % |
|---|---|---|---|
| Nora Lawrence Smith | Democratic Party | 233,926 | 91.78 |
| J. E. Peterson | Republican Party | 19,827 | 7.78 |
| Susue C. Barrett | Prohibition Party | 1,125 | 0.44 |
| Total | | 254,878 | 100.00 |

4th congressional district
| Candidate | Party | Votes | % |
|---|---|---|---|
| N. F. Culpepper | Democratic Party | 233,952 | 91.78 |
| H. O. Lovvorn | Republican Party | 19,838 | 7.78 |
| C. F. Johnson | Prohibition Party | 1,125 | 0.44 |
| Total | | 254,915 | 100.00 |

5th congressional district
| Candidate | Party | Votes | % |
|---|---|---|---|
| John W. Weeks | Democratic Party | 233,967 | 91.61 |
| Earl S. Scott | Republican Party | 19,828 | 7.76 |
| Ralph Watson | Prohibition Party | 1,125 | 0.44 |
| M. J. Merlin | Socialist Party of America | 461 | 0.18 |
| Samuel Johnson | Communist Party | 23 | 0.01 |
| Total | | 255,404 | 100.00 |

6th congressional district
| Candidate | Party | Votes | % |
|---|---|---|---|
| Charles J. Bloch | Democratic Party | 233,951 | 91.61 |
| George S. Jones | Republican Party | 19,828 | 7.76 |
| Mrs. E. L. Cowan | Prohibition Party | 1,125 | 0.44 |
| J. Haskin | Socialist Party of America | 461 | 0.18 |
| Total | | 255,365 | 100.00 |

7th congressional district
| Candidate | Party | Votes | % |
|---|---|---|---|
| Newt Morris | Democratic Party | 233,951 | 91.61 |
| Garnett S. Andrews, Jr. | Republican Party | 19,829 | 7.76 |
| J. Walter Rice | Prohibition Party | 1,125 | 0.44 |
| Edith Washburn | Socialist Party of America | 461 | 0.18 |
| Total | | 255,366 | 100.00 |

8th congressional district
| Candidate | Party | Votes | % |
|---|---|---|---|
| DeWitt Roberts | Democratic Party | 233,949 | 91.61 |
| H. J. Carswell | Republican Party | 19,828 | 7.76 |
| Joe Lawrence | Prohibition Party | 1,125 | 0.44 |
| George D. Smith | Socialist Party of America | 461 | 0.18 |
| Total | | 255,363 | 100.00 |

9th congressional district
| Candidate | Party | Votes | % |
|---|---|---|---|
| Mary Jarrett White | Democratic Party | 233,938 | 91.61 |
| W. Y. Gilliam | Republican Party | 19,828 | 7.76 |
| H. J. Morgan | Prohibition Party | 1,125 | 0.44 |
| August Andreae | Socialist Party of America | 461 | 0.18 |
| H. V. Haranis | Communist Party | 23 | 0.01 |
| Total | | 255,375 | 100.00 |

10th congressional district
| Candidate | Party | Votes | % |
|---|---|---|---|
| Hugh J. Rowe | Democratic Party | 233,949 | 91.61 |
| C. L. Upchurch | Republican Party | 19,827 | 7.76 |
| George W. Gaines | Prohibition Party | 1,125 | 0.44 |
| Earl L. Bell | Socialist Party of America | 461 | 0.18 |
| Total | | 255,362 | 100.00 |

=== Results by county ===
| County | Franklin Delano Roosevelt Democratic | | Herbert Clark Hoover Republican | | William David Upshaw Prohibition | | Norman Mattoon Thomas Socialist | | William Z. Foster Communist | | Margin | | Total votes cast |
| County | # | % | # | % | # | % | # | % | # | % | # | % | Total votes cast |
|---|---|---|---|---|---|---|---|---|---|---|---|---|---|
| Appling | 601 | 90.38% | 64 | 9.62% | 0 | 0.00% | 0 | 0.00% | 0 | 0.00% | 537 | 80.75% | 665 |
| Atkinson | 747 | 94.20% | 41 | 5.17% | 3 | 0.38% | 2 | 0.25% | 0 | 0.00% | 706 | 89.03% | 793 |
| Bacon | 515 | 97.54% | 11 | 2.08% | 2 | 0.38% | 0 | 0.00% | 0 | 0.00% | 504 | 95.45% | 528 |
| Baker | 647 | 99.23% | 2 | 0.31% | 3 | 0.46% | 0 | 0.00% | 0 | 0.00% | 644 (Note: In this county where Upshaw ran second ahead of Hoover, margin given is Roosevelt vote minus Upshaw vote and percentage margin Roosevelt percentage minus Upshaw percentage.) | 98.77% | 652 |
| Baldwin | 801 | 93.79% | 45 | 5.27% | 4 | 0.47% | 4 | 0.47% | 0 | 0.00% | 756 | 88.52% | 854 |
| Banks | 1,283 | 94.27% | 58 | 4.26% | 20 | 1.47% | 0 | 0.00% | 0 | 0.00% | 1,225 | 90.01% | 1,361 |
| Barrow | 1,111 | 97.03% | 23 | 2.01% | 9 | 0.79% | 2 | 0.17% | 0 | 0.00% | 1,088 | 95.02% | 1,145 |
| Bartow | 1,546 | 92.19% | 121 | 7.22% | 9 | 0.54% | 1 | 0.06% | 0 | 0.00% | 1,425 | 84.97% | 1,677 |
| Ben Hill | 1,026 | 91.94% | 85 | 7.62% | 5 | 0.45% | 0 | 0.00% | 0 | 0.00% | 941 | 84.32% | 1,116 |
| Berrien | 1,447 | 97.44% | 19 | 1.28% | 19 | 1.28% | 0 | 0.00% | 0 | 0.00% | 1,428 | 96.16% | 1,485 |
| Bibb | 4,372 | 90.93% | 405 | 8.42% | 22 | 0.46% | 8 | 0.17% | 1 | 0.02% | 3,967 | 82.51% | 4,808 |
| Bleckley | 1,338 | 97.24% | 37 | 2.69% | 0 | 0.00% | 1 | 0.07% | 0 | 0.00% | 1,301 | 94.55% | 1,376 |
| Brantley | 693 | 96.65% | 22 | 3.07% | 2 | 0.28% | 0 | 0.00% | 0 | 0.00% | 671 | 93.58% | 717 |
| Brooks | 1,426 | 94.69% | 75 | 4.98% | 5 | 0.33% | 0 | 0.00% | 0 | 0.00% | 1,351 | 89.71% | 1,506 |
| Bryan | 353 | 94.64% | 17 | 4.56% | 3 | 0.80% | 0 | 0.00% | 0 | 0.00% | 336 | 90.08% | 373 |
| Bulloch | 2,203 | 98.74% | 17 | 0.76% | 9 | 0.40% | 2 | 0.09% | 0 | 0.00% | 2,186 | 97.98% | 2,231 |
| Burke | 498 | 95.40% | 18 | 3.45% | 6 | 1.15% | 0 | 0.00% | 0 | 0.00% | 480 | 91.95% | 522 |
| Butts | 1,693 | 98.14% | 21 | 1.22% | 11 | 0.64% | 0 | 0.00% | 0 | 0.00% | 1,672 | 96.93% | 1,725 |
| Calhoun | 483 | 97.18% | 10 | 2.01% | 4 | 0.80% | 0 | 0.00% | 0 | 0.00% | 473 | 95.17% | 497 |
| Camden | 417 | 88.91% | 49 | 10.45% | 3 | 0.64% | 0 | 0.00% | 0 | 0.00% | 368 | 78.46% | 469 |
| Candler | 476 | 97.14% | 13 | 2.65% | 1 | 0.20% | 0 | 0.00% | 0 | 0.00% | 463 | 94.49% | 490 |
| Carroll | 3,232 | 91.14% | 284 | 8.01% | 30 | 0.85% | 0 | 0.00% | 0 | 0.00% | 2,948 | 83.14% | 3,546 |
| Catoosa | 985 | 88.18% | 123 | 11.01% | 5 | 0.45% | 4 | 0.36% | 0 | 0.00% | 862 | 77.17% | 1,117 |
| Charlton | 330 | 90.91% | 32 | 8.82% | 1 | 0.28% | 0 | 0.00% | 0 | 0.00% | 298 | 82.09% | 363 |
| Chatham | 8,020 | 82.31% | 1,669 | 17.13% | 13 | 0.13% | 39 | 0.40% | 3 | 0.03% | 6,351 | 65.18% | 9,744 |
| Chattahoochee | 186 | 99.47% | 1 | 0.53% | 0 | 0.00% | 0 | 0.00% | 0 | 0.00% | 185 | 98.93% | 187 |
| Chattooga | 2,200 | 91.25% | 188 | 7.80% | 22 | 0.91% | 1 | 0.04% | 0 | 0.00% | 2,012 | 83.45% | 2,411 |
| Cherokee | 1,727 | 83.88% | 314 | 15.25% | 14 | 0.68% | 3 | 0.15% | 1 | 0.05% | 1,413 | 68.63% | 2,059 |
| Clarke | 1,992 | 92.05% | 159 | 7.35% | 4 | 0.18% | 9 | 0.42% | 0 | 0.00% | 1,833 | 84.70% | 2,164 |
| Clay | 433 | 96.65% | 12 | 2.68% | 3 | 0.67% | 0 | 0.00% | 0 | 0.00% | 421 | 93.97% | 448 |
| Clayton | 1,361 | 97.01% | 35 | 2.49% | 5 | 0.36% | 2 | 0.14% | 0 | 0.00% | 1,326 | 94.51% | 1,403 |
| Clinch | 461 | 97.26% | 11 | 2.32% | 2 | 0.42% | 0 | 0.00% | 0 | 0.00% | 450 | 94.94% | 474 |
| Cobb | 3,079 | 92.71% | 218 | 6.56% | 23 | 0.69% | 1 | 0.03% | 0 | 0.00% | 2,861 | 86.15% | 3,321 |
| Coffee | 1,652 | 97.06% | 29 | 1.70% | 17 | 1.00% | 4 | 0.24% | 0 | 0.00% | 1,623 | 95.36% | 1,702 |
| Colquitt | 3,534 | 96.77% | 101 | 2.77% | 15 | 0.41% | 2 | 0.05% | 0 | 0.00% | 3,433 | 94.00% | 3,652 |
| Columbia | 528 | 97.96% | 11 | 2.04% | 0 | 0.00% | 0 | 0.00% | 0 | 0.00% | 517 | 95.92% | 539 |
| Cook | 1,408 | 97.78% | 25 | 1.74% | 6 | 0.42% | 1 | 0.07% | 0 | 0.00% | 1,383 | 96.04% | 1,440 |
| Coweta | 2,183 | 97.67% | 46 | 2.06% | 6 | 0.27% | 0 | 0.00% | 0 | 0.00% | 2,137 | 95.62% | 2,235 |
| Crawford | 272 | 96.80% | 9 | 3.20% | 0 | 0.00% | 0 | 0.00% | 0 | 0.00% | 263 | 93.59% | 281 |
| Crisp | 725 | 97.97% | 10 | 1.35% | 4 | 0.54% | 1 | 0.14% | 0 | 0.00% | 715 | 96.62% | 740 |
| Dade | 770 | 86.81% | 103 | 11.61% | 7 | 0.79% | 7 | 0.79% | 0 | 0.00% | 667 | 75.20% | 887 |
| Dawson | 567 | 83.88% | 105 | 15.53% | 4 | 0.59% | 0 | 0.00% | 0 | 0.00% | 462 | 68.34% | 676 |
| Decatur | 1,169 | 93.00% | 65 | 5.17% | 7 | 0.56% | 16 | 1.27% | 0 | 0.00% | 1,104 | 87.83% | 1,257 |
| DeKalb | 5,323 | 88.14% | 633 | 10.48% | 37 | 0.61% | 45 | 0.75% | 1 | 0.02% | 4,690 | 77.66% | 6,039 |
| Dodge | 2,809 | 98.80% | 33 | 1.16% | 1 | 0.04% | 0 | 0.00% | 0 | 0.00% | 2,776 | 97.64% | 2,843 |
| Dooly | 1,139 | 98.96% | 8 | 0.70% | 4 | 0.35% | 0 | 0.00% | 0 | 0.00% | 1,131 | 98.26% | 1,151 |
| Dougherty | 2,012 | 95.04% | 95 | 4.49% | 2 | 0.09% | 8 | 0.38% | 0 | 0.00% | 1,917 | 90.55% | 2,117 |
| Douglas | 1,013 | 93.19% | 57 | 5.24% | 16 | 1.47% | 1 | 0.09% | 0 | 0.00% | 956 | 87.95% | 1,087 |
| Early | 1,131 | 98.18% | 19 | 1.65% | 2 | 0.17% | 0 | 0.00% | 0 | 0.00% | 1,112 | 96.53% | 1,152 |
| Echols | 414 | 98.81% | 5 | 1.19% | 0 | 0.00% | 0 | 0.00% | 0 | 0.00% | 409 | 97.61% | 419 |
| Effingham | 518 | 84.92% | 90 | 14.75% | 2 | 0.33% | 0 | 0.00% | 0 | 0.00% | 428 | 70.16% | 610 |
| Elbert | 2,023 | 95.47% | 77 | 3.63% | 16 | 0.76% | 3 | 0.14% | 0 | 0.00% | 1,946 | 91.84% | 2,119 |
| Emanuel | 2,420 | 98.49% | 33 | 1.34% | 2 | 0.08% | 2 | 0.08% | 0 | 0.00% | 2,387 | 97.15% | 2,457 |
| Evans | 548 | 95.14% | 21 | 3.65% | 7 | 1.22% | 0 | 0.00% | 0 | 0.00% | 527 | 91.49% | 576 |
| Fannin | 1,375 | 41.14% | 1,967 | 58.86% | 0 | 0.00% | 0 | 0.00% | 0 | 0.00% | -592 | -17.71% | 3,342 |
| Fayette | 746 | 99.07% | 6 | 0.80% | 1 | 0.13% | 0 | 0.00% | 0 | 0.00% | 740 | 98.27% | 753 |
| Floyd | 4,342 | 92.94% | 300 | 6.42% | 19 | 0.41% | 11 | 0.24% | 0 | 0.00% | 4,042 | 86.52% | 4,672 |
| Forsyth | 1,627 | 92.97% | 117 | 6.69% | 6 | 0.34% | 0 | 0.00% | 0 | 0.00% | 1,510 | 86.29% | 1,750 |
| Franklin | 1,361 | 93.16% | 78 | 5.34% | 18 | 1.23% | 4 | 0.27% | 0 | 0.00% | 1,283 | 87.82% | 1,461 |
| Fulton | 20,137 | 89.69% | 2,063 | 9.19% | 144 | 0.64% | 103 | 0.46% | 6 | 0.03% | 18,074 | 80.50% | 22,453 |
| Gilmer | 1,210 | 66.27% | 616 | 33.73% | 0 | 0.00% | 0 | 0.00% | 0 | 0.00% | 594 | 32.53% | 1,826 |
| Glascock | 393 | 98.25% | 7 | 1.75% | 0 | 0.00% | 0 | 0.00% | 0 | 0.00% | 386 | 96.50% | 400 |
| Glynn | 1,262 | 86.91% | 186 | 12.81% | 2 | 0.14% | 2 | 0.14% | 0 | 0.00% | 1,076 | 74.10% | 1,452 |
| Gordon | 1,708 | 92.42% | 122 | 6.60% | 13 | 0.70% | 5 | 0.27% | 0 | 0.00% | 1,586 | 85.82% | 1,848 |
| Grady | 2,184 | 96.89% | 60 | 2.66% | 10 | 0.44% | 0 | 0.00% | 0 | 0.00% | 2,124 | 94.23% | 2,254 |
| Greene | 918 | 94.44% | 52 | 5.35% | 2 | 0.21% | 0 | 0.00% | 0 | 0.00% | 866 | 89.09% | 972 |
| Gwinnett | 2,616 | 96.60% | 91 | 3.36% | 0 | 0.00% | 1 | 0.04% | 0 | 0.00% | 2,525 | 93.24% | 2,708 |
| Habersham | 1,693 | 86.95% | 225 | 11.56% | 15 | 0.77% | 14 | 0.72% | 0 | 0.00% | 1,468 | 75.40% | 1,947 |
| Hall | 2,649 | 95.29% | 120 | 4.32% | 11 | 0.40% | 0 | 0.00% | 0 | 0.00% | 2,529 | 90.97% | 2,780 |
| Hancock | 529 | 96.01% | 18 | 3.27% | 4 | 0.73% | 0 | 0.00% | 0 | 0.00% | 511 | 92.74% | 551 |
| Haralson | 1,278 | 85.14% | 223 | 14.86% | 0 | 0.00% | 0 | 0.00% | 0 | 0.00% | 1,055 | 70.29% | 1,501 |
| Harris | 851 | 97.26% | 21 | 2.40% | 3 | 0.34% | 0 | 0.00% | 0 | 0.00% | 830 | 94.86% | 875 |
| Hart | 1,261 | 98.98% | 12 | 0.94% | 1 | 0.08% | 0 | 0.00% | 0 | 0.00% | 1,249 | 98.04% | 1,274 |
| Heard | 989 | 97.34% | 24 | 2.36% | 3 | 0.30% | 0 | 0.00% | 0 | 0.00% | 965 | 94.98% | 1,016 |
| Henry | 1,496 | 97.65% | 21 | 1.37% | 15 | 0.98% | 0 | 0.00% | 0 | 0.00% | 1,475 | 96.28% | 1,532 |
| Houston | 460 | 94.46% | 27 | 5.54% | 0 | 0.00% | 0 | 0.00% | 0 | 0.00% | 433 | 88.91% | 487 |
| Irwin | 1,416 | 98.40% | 22 | 1.53% | 1 | 0.07% | 0 | 0.00% | 0 | 0.00% | 1,394 | 96.87% | 1,439 |
| Jackson | 1,389 | 93.54% | 80 | 5.39% | 12 | 0.81% | 4 | 0.27% | 0 | 0.00% | 1,309 | 88.15% | 1,485 |
| Jasper | 773 | 97.85% | 14 | 1.77% | 3 | 0.38% | 0 | 0.00% | 0 | 0.00% | 759 | 96.08% | 790 |
| Jeff Davis | 1,179 | 95.70% | 50 | 4.06% | 3 | 0.24% | 0 | 0.00% | 0 | 0.00% | 1,129 | 91.64% | 1,232 |
| Jefferson | 1,454 | 94.66% | 65 | 4.23% | 16 | 1.04% | 1 | 0.07% | 0 | 0.00% | 1,389 | 90.43% | 1,536 |
| Jenkins | 510 | 96.23% | 20 | 3.77% | 0 | 0.00% | 0 | 0.00% | 0 | 0.00% | 490 | 92.45% | 530 |
| Johnson | 1,314 | 98.06% | 18 | 1.34% | 8 | 0.60% | 0 | 0.00% | 0 | 0.00% | 1,296 | 96.72% | 1,340 |
| Jones | 553 | 99.46% | 0 | 0.00% | 2 | 0.36% | 1 | 0.18% | 0 | 0.00% | 551 | 99.10% | 556 |
| Lamar | 714 | 94.69% | 33 | 4.38% | 4 | 0.53% | 3 | 0.40% | 0 | 0.00% | 681 | 90.32% | 754 |
| Lanier | 211 | 97.24% | 3 | 1.38% | 3 | 1.38% | 0 | 0.00% | 0 | 0.00% | 208 | 95.85% | 217 |
| Laurens | 2,188 | 98.25% | 38 | 1.71% | 1 | 0.04% | 0 | 0.00% | 0 | 0.00% | 2,150 | 96.54% | 2,227 |
| Lee | 252 | 97.67% | 6 | 2.33% | 0 | 0.00% | 0 | 0.00% | 0 | 0.00% | 246 | 95.35% | 258 |
| Liberty | 289 | 93.83% | 18 | 5.84% | 1 | 0.32% | 0 | 0.00% | 0 | 0.00% | 271 | 87.99% | 308 |
| Lincoln | 660 | 99.40% | 3 | 0.45% | 1 | 0.15% | 0 | 0.00% | 0 | 0.00% | 657 | 98.95% | 664 |
| Long | 430 | 95.77% | 14 | 3.12% | 5 | 1.11% | 0 | 0.00% | 0 | 0.00% | 416 | 92.65% | 449 |
| Lowndes | 1,840 | 94.65% | 97 | 4.99% | 6 | 0.31% | 1 | 0.05% | 0 | 0.00% | 1,743 | 89.66% | 1,944 |
| Lumpkin | 924 | 91.94% | 81 | 8.06% | 0 | 0.00% | 0 | 0.00% | 0 | 0.00% | 843 | 83.88% | 1,005 |
| Macon | 1,438 | 96.06% | 55 | 3.67% | 4 | 0.27% | 0 | 0.00% | 0 | 0.00% | 1,383 | 92.38% | 1,497 |
| Madison | 2,124 | 97.88% | 38 | 1.75% | 8 | 0.37% | 0 | 0.00% | 0 | 0.00% | 2,086 | 96.13% | 2,170 |
| Marion | 455 | 94.99% | 24 | 5.01% | 0 | 0.00% | 0 | 0.00% | 0 | 0.00% | 431 | 89.98% | 479 |
| McDuffie | 568 | 94.04% | 29 | 4.80% | 7 | 1.16% | 0 | 0.00% | 0 | 0.00% | 539 | 89.24% | 604 |
| McIntosh | 271 | 93.45% | 19 | 6.55% | 0 | 0.00% | 0 | 0.00% | 0 | 0.00% | 252 | 86.90% | 290 |
| Meriwether | 2,604 | 97.82% | 53 | 1.99% | 4 | 0.15% | 1 | 0.04% | 0 | 0.00% | 2,551 | 95.83% | 2,662 |
| Miller | 392 | 98.99% | 0 | 0.00% | 0 | 0.00% | 4 | 1.01% | 0 | 0.00% | 388 (Note: In this county where Thomas ran second ahead of Hoover, margin given is Roosevelt vote minus Thomas vote and percentage margin Roosevelt percentage minus Thomas percentage.) | 97.98% | 396 |
| Mitchell | 2,097 | 99.06% | 15 | 0.71% | 5 | 0.24% | 0 | 0.00% | 0 | 0.00% | 2,082 | 98.35% | 2,117 |
| Monroe | 1,200 | 96.31% | 45 | 3.61% | 1 | 0.08% | 0 | 0.00% | 0 | 0.00% | 1,155 | 92.70% | 1,246 |
| Montgomery | 868 | 97.20% | 17 | 1.90% | 8 | 0.90% | 0 | 0.00% | 0 | 0.00% | 851 | 95.30% | 893 |
| Morgan | 923 | 91.75% | 74 | 7.36% | 8 | 0.80% | 1 | 0.10% | 0 | 0.00% | 849 | 84.39% | 1,006 |
| Murray | 1,874 | 83.92% | 350 | 15.67% | 9 | 0.40% | 0 | 0.00% | 0 | 0.00% | 1,524 | 68.25% | 2,233 |
| Muscogee | 3,413 | 93.07% | 230 | 6.27% | 9 | 0.25% | 15 | 0.41% | 0 | 0.00% | 3,183 | 86.80% | 3,667 |
| Newton | 1,672 | 96.82% | 45 | 2.61% | 7 | 0.41% | 3 | 0.17% | 0 | 0.00% | 1,627 | 94.21% | 1,727 |
| Oconee | 664 | 92.48% | 39 | 5.43% | 13 | 1.81% | 2 | 0.28% | 0 | 0.00% | 625 | 87.05% | 718 |
| Oglethorpe | 1,240 | 97.03% | 34 | 2.66% | 2 | 0.16% | 0 | 0.00% | 2 | 0.16% | 1,206 | 94.37% | 1,278 |
| Paulding | 1,914 | 85.98% | 276 | 12.40% | 31 | 1.39% | 5 | 0.22% | 0 | 0.00% | 1,638 | 73.58% | 2,226 |
| Peach | 595 | 90.70% | 56 | 8.54% | 3 | 0.46% | 2 | 0.30% | 0 | 0.00% | 539 | 82.16% | 656 |
| Pickens | 1,472 | 66.46% | 743 | 33.54% | 0 | 0.00% | 0 | 0.00% | 0 | 0.00% | 729 | 32.91% | 2,215 |
| Pierce | 1,094 | 96.90% | 29 | 2.57% | 6 | 0.53% | 0 | 0.00% | 0 | 0.00% | 1,065 | 94.33% | 1,129 |
| Pike | 1,021 | 95.96% | 33 | 3.10% | 10 | 0.94% | 0 | 0.00% | 0 | 0.00% | 988 | 92.86% | 1,064 |
| Polk | 2,170 | 91.14% | 211 | 8.86% | 0 | 0.00% | 0 | 0.00% | 0 | 0.00% | 1,959 | 82.28% | 2,381 |
| Pulaski | 973 | 98.58% | 14 | 1.42% | 0 | 0.00% | 0 | 0.00% | 0 | 0.00% | 959 | 97.16% | 987 |
| Putnam | 770 | 95.53% | 33 | 4.09% | 2 | 0.25% | 1 | 0.12% | 0 | 0.00% | 737 | 91.44% | 806 |
| Quitman | 239 | 98.35% | 0 | 0.00% | 4 | 1.65% | 0 | 0.00% | 0 | 0.00% | 235 | 96.71% | 243 |
| Rabun | 893 | 91.22% | 78 | 7.97% | 6 | 0.61% | 1 | 0.10% | 1 | 0.10% | 815 | 83.25% | 979 |
| Randolph | 1,344 | 97.18% | 31 | 2.24% | 8 | 0.58% | 0 | 0.00% | 0 | 0.00% | 1,313 | 94.94% | 1,383 |
| Richmond | 4,873 | 85.58% | 738 | 12.96% | 27 | 0.47% | 53 | 0.93% | 3 | 0.05% | 4,135 | 72.62% | 5,694 |
| Rockdale | 461 | 95.45% | 18 | 3.73% | 4 | 0.83% | 0 | 0.00% | 0 | 0.00% | 443 | 91.72% | 483 |
| Schley | 398 | 97.55% | 8 | 1.96% | 2 | 0.49% | 0 | 0.00% | 0 | 0.00% | 390 | 95.59% | 408 |
| Screven | 508 | 91.20% | 46 | 8.26% | 3 | 0.54% | 0 | 0.00% | 0 | 0.00% | 462 | 82.94% | 557 |
| Seminole | 776 | 96.28% | 20 | 2.48% | 8 | 0.99% | 2 | 0.25% | 0 | 0.00% | 756 | 93.80% | 806 |
| Spalding | 2,185 | 97.07% | 54 | 2.40% | 8 | 0.36% | 4 | 0.18% | 0 | 0.00% | 2,131 | 94.67% | 2,251 |
| Stephens | 1,026 | 97.53% | 18 | 1.71% | 6 | 0.57% | 2 | 0.19% | 0 | 0.00% | 1,008 | 95.82% | 1,052 |
| Stewart | 588 | 97.03% | 15 | 2.48% | 3 | 0.50% | 0 | 0.00% | 0 | 0.00% | 573 | 94.55% | 606 |
| Sumter | 1,619 | 95.69% | 57 | 3.37% | 16 | 0.95% | 0 | 0.00% | 0 | 0.00% | 1,562 | 92.32% | 1,692 |
| Talbot | 912 | 95.00% | 45 | 4.69% | 3 | 0.31% | 0 | 0.00% | 0 | 0.00% | 867 | 90.31% | 960 |
| Taliaferro | 503 | 99.41% | 3 | 0.59% | 0 | 0.00% | 0 | 0.00% | 0 | 0.00% | 500 | 98.81% | 506 |
| Tattnall | 2,133 | 98.02% | 37 | 1.70% | 6 | 0.28% | 0 | 0.00% | 0 | 0.00% | 2,096 | 96.32% | 2,176 |
| Taylor | 685 | 93.58% | 44 | 6.01% | 1 | 0.14% | 2 | 0.27% | 0 | 0.00% | 641 | 87.57% | 732 |
| Telfair | 746 | 93.60% | 45 | 5.65% | 5 | 0.63% | 1 | 0.13% | 0 | 0.00% | 701 | 87.95% | 797 |
| Terrell | 1,000 | 97.37% | 24 | 2.34% | 3 | 0.29% | 0 | 0.00% | 0 | 0.00% | 976 | 95.03% | 1,027 |
| Thomas | 2,607 | 96.20% | 90 | 3.32% | 9 | 0.33% | 4 | 0.15% | 0 | 0.00% | 2,517 | 92.88% | 2,710 |
| Tift | 1,394 | 95.09% | 65 | 4.43% | 5 | 0.34% | 2 | 0.14% | 0 | 0.00% | 1,329 | 90.65% | 1,466 |
| Toombs | 1,868 | 96.49% | 54 | 2.79% | 8 | 0.41% | 6 | 0.31% | 0 | 0.00% | 1,814 | 93.70% | 1,936 |
| Towns | 742 | 48.43% | 790 | 51.57% | 0 | 0.00% | 0 | 0.00% | 0 | 0.00% | -48 | -3.13% | 1,532 |
| Treutlen | 849 | 95.93% | 36 | 4.07% | 0 | 0.00% | 0 | 0.00% | 0 | 0.00% | 813 | 91.86% | 885 |
| Troup | 2,371 | 96.62% | 81 | 3.30% | 2 | 0.08% | 0 | 0.00% | 0 | 0.00% | 2,290 | 93.32% | 2,454 |
| Turner | 909 | 93.04% | 59 | 6.04% | 6 | 0.61% | 3 | 0.31% | 0 | 0.00% | 850 | 87.00% | 977 |
| Twiggs | 646 | 97.29% | 15 | 2.26% | 2 | 0.30% | 1 | 0.15% | 0 | 0.00% | 631 | 95.03% | 664 |
| Union | 1,344 | 62.40% | 810 | 37.60% | 0 | 0.00% | 0 | 0.00% | 0 | 0.00% | 534 | 24.79% | 2,154 |
| Upson | 1,660 | 98.57% | 20 | 1.19% | 3 | 0.18% | 1 | 0.06% | 0 | 0.00% | 1,640 | 97.39% | 1,684 |
| Walker | 2,255 | 83.80% | 405 | 15.05% | 22 | 0.82% | 7 | 0.26% | 2 | 0.07% | 1,850 | 68.75% | 2,691 |
| Walton | 2,136 | 98.34% | 36 | 1.66% | 0 | 0.00% | 0 | 0.00% | 0 | 0.00% | 2,100 | 96.69% | 2,172 |
| Ware | 2,504 | 91.96% | 205 | 7.53% | 9 | 0.33% | 4 | 0.15% | 1 | 0.04% | 2,299 | 84.43% | 2,723 |
| Warren | 676 | 96.99% | 18 | 2.58% | 3 | 0.43% | 0 | 0.00% | 0 | 0.00% | 658 | 94.40% | 697 |
| Washington | 1,923 | 99.33% | 9 | 0.46% | 3 | 0.15% | 1 | 0.05% | 0 | 0.00% | 1,914 | 98.86% | 1,936 |
| Wayne | 1,044 | 93.97% | 60 | 5.40% | 3 | 0.27% | 3 | 0.27% | 1 | 0.09% | 984 | 88.57% | 1,111 |
| Webster | 235 | 97.92% | 5 | 2.08% | 0 | 0.00% | 0 | 0.00% | 0 | 0.00% | 230 | 95.83% | 240 |
| Wheeler | 1,127 | 97.41% | 29 | 2.51% | 1 | 0.09% | 0 | 0.00% | 0 | 0.00% | 1,098 | 94.90% | 1,157 |
| White | 936 | 94.45% | 53 | 5.35% | 2 | 0.20% | 0 | 0.00% | 0 | 0.00% | 883 | 89.10% | 991 |
| Whitfield | 2,384 | 81.87% | 483 | 16.59% | 35 | 1.20% | 9 | 0.31% | 1 | 0.03% | 1,901 | 65.28% | 2,912 |
| Wilcox | 619 | 95.97% | 25 | 3.88% | 0 | 0.00% | 1 | 0.16% | 0 | 0.00% | 594 | 92.09% | 645 |
| Wilkes | 1,172 | 95.75% | 42 | 3.43% | 9 | 0.74% | 1 | 0.08% | 0 | 0.00% | 1,130 | 92.32% | 1,224 |
| Wilkinson | 726 | 100.00% | 0 | 0.00% | 0 | 0.00% | 0 | 0.00% | 0 | 0.00% | 726 | 100.00% | 726 |
| Worth | 2,269 | 98.23% | 38 | 1.65% | 3 | 0.13% | 0 | 0.00% | 0 | 0.00% | 2,231 | 96.58% | 2,310 |
| Totals | 234,118 | 91.60% | 19,863 | 7.77% | 1,125 | 0.44% | 461 | 0.18% | 23 | 0.01% | 214,255 | 83.83% | 255,590 |

==== Counties that flipped from Republican to Democratic ====
- Chattooga
- Decatur
- Murray
- Paulding
- Screven
- Gwinnett
- Glynn
- Bartow
- Brantley
- Carroll
- Catoosa
- Clayton
- Cobb
- DeKalb
- Douglas
- Gilmer
- Effingham
- Fulton
- Forsyth
- Floyd
- Franklin
- Glascock
- Gordon
- Habersham
- Hall
- Liberty
- Jefferson
- Haralson
- Long
- Madison
- McDuffie
- McIntosh
- Milton
- Paulding
- Pickens
- Richmond
- Tattnall
- Turner
- Union
- Walker
- Warren
- White
- Whitfield
- Wilkes
- Appling
- Barrow
- Cherokee
