= Lauren Hill =

Lauren Hill (or similar) is the name of:

- Lauryn Hill (born 1975), American rapper, singer, and member of the Fugees
- Lauren Michelle Hill (born 1979), February 2001 Playboy Playmate of the Month
- Lauren Hill (basketball) (1995–2015), American college basketball player and cancer research activist
- Loren Hill, songwriter on Dance for Me
- Lauren Hill (figure skater) in 1999 United States Figure Skating Championships
- Lauren Hill (soccer) on Michigan Hawks

== See also ==
- LaurenHill Academy
- Laurens Hill, Georgia, a community in the United States
- Laurie Hill (disambiguation)
