= Lovette =

Lovette is a given name and surname. Notable people with the name include:

== Given name ==
- Lovette George (1961–2006), musical theatre actress and singer
- Lovette Hill (1907–1989), head coach of the Houston Cougars baseball team

== Surname ==
- Eddie Lovette (1943–1998), reggae musician
- Lauren Lovette, New York City Ballet dancer
- Lizzy Lovette, Australian radio and TV presenter
- Oscar Lovette (1871–1934), United States Representative from Tennessee

== See also ==
- Lovett (disambiguation)
