= Million Minutes of Peace =

1986 United Nations appeal

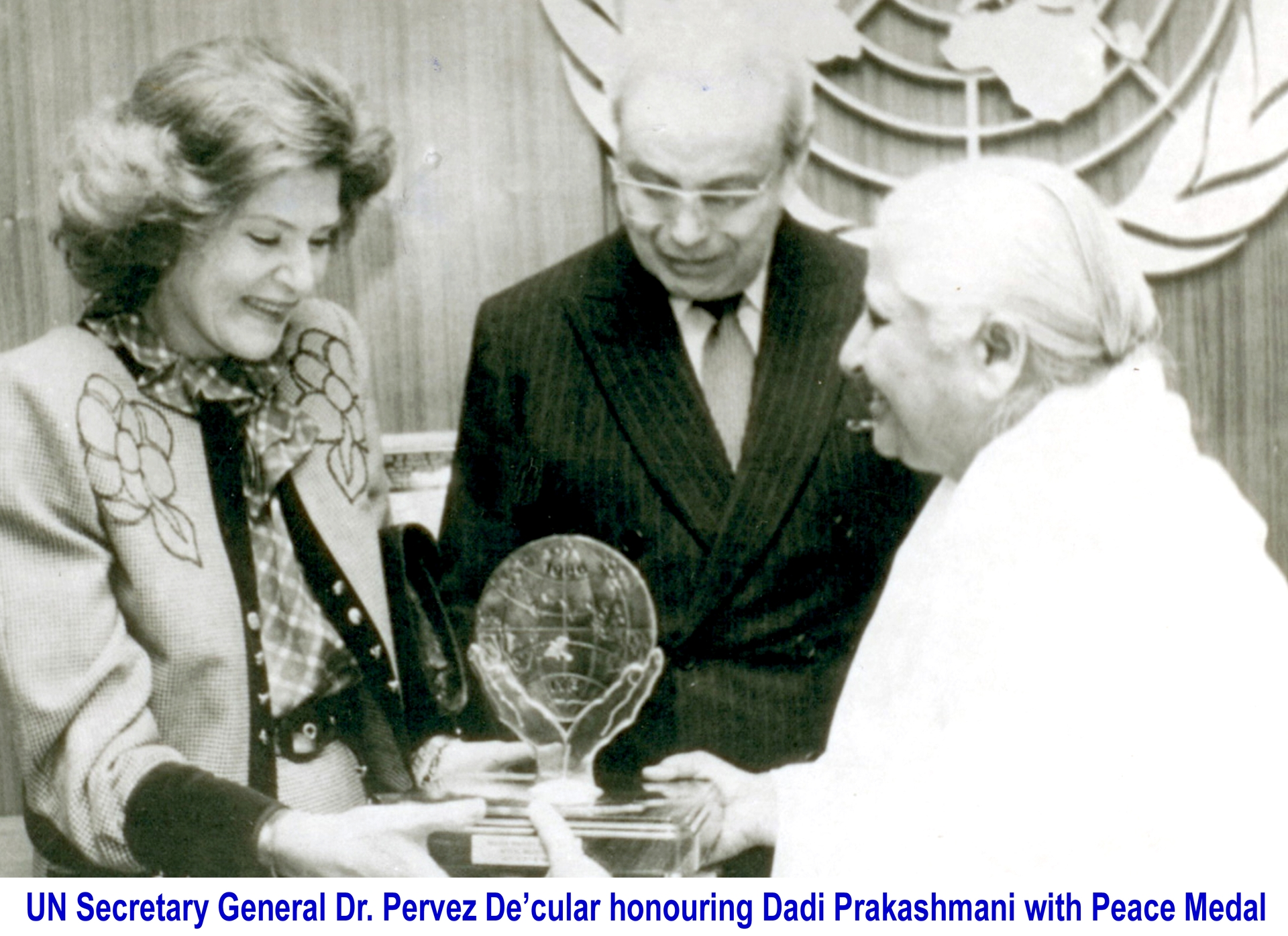
- Dadi Prakashmani, administrative head of the Brahma Kumaris, who received United Nations Peace Messenger recognition in 1987 following the appeal
- Date: mid-September to 24 October 1986
- Venue: Handover at the United Nations, New York
- Also known as: Million Minutes of Peace Appeal
- Type: Peace appeal
- Organised by: Brahma Kumaris World Spiritual University
- Participants: Pledges from 88 countries
- Outcome: UN Peace Messenger awards (1987); follow-on Global Co-operation for a Better World project (1988)

Million Minutes of Peace, also called the Million Minutes of Peace Appeal, was a 1986 international peace appeal coordinated by the Brahma Kumaris World Spiritual University as part of the United Nations' International Year of Peace. The appeal asked participants to pledge time spent in meditation, prayer or positive reflection rather than money. According to the Brahma Kumaris, pledges totalling 1,231,975,713 minutes from 88 countries were presented to United Nations Secretary-General Javier Perez de Cuellar on 24 October 1986.

The appeal was part of a wider period of United Nations engagement by the Brahma Kumaris, which had been affiliated with the UN Department of Public Information from 1980 and had gained consultative status with the United Nations Economic and Social Council in 1983. The campaign was followed by the Brahma Kumaris' 1987 Peace Messenger recognition and by Global Co-operation for a Better World, a 1988–1993 follow-on initiative that collected public responses on the theme of a better world and led to the publication of Visions of a Better World.

== Background ==
The International Year of Peace was designated by the United Nations for 1986. It followed earlier UN observances and was intended to encourage governments, non-governmental organisations and civil society groups to organise activities around peace, disarmament and international cooperation. The Brahma Kumaris had developed a public programme of meditation teaching and values education by the 1980s.

The organisation's UN-related work formed part of a broader institutional expansion under Dadi Prakashmani, who served as its administrative head from 1969 to 2007. Its UN affiliations, public campaigns and international conferences were among the ways in which the Brahma Kumaris presented itself outside its internal millenarian religious framework and developed a more outward-facing public presence.

== The appeal (1986) ==
=== Origin and structure ===
According to the Brahma Kumaris, the idea for the Million Minutes of Peace appeal emerged in December 1985 from three Australian members of the organisation who were discussing possible projects for the forthcoming International Year of Peace while travelling between Sydney and Canberra. The appeal asked individuals and groups to pledge minutes spent in silent reflection, meditation, prayer or positive thinking and to contribute those pledged minutes to a symbolic "World Peace Bank".

The target was to collect one million minutes of peace from each participating country. The organisation later reported that the appeal ran from mid-September to 24 October 1986 and produced pledges totalling 1,231,975,713 minutes from 88 countries, which it described as equivalent to approximately 2,344 years of peace.

=== Conduct and presentation ===
United Nations documentation on activities for the International Year of Peace recorded, under India, that the "Million Minutes of Peace Appeal" had been endorsed by the head of state and that nationwide activities were coordinated by the Brahma Kumaris World Spiritual University. The pledged minutes were presented to Secretary-General Javier Perez de Cuellar at the United Nations on 24 October 1986, which is United Nations Day.

The appeal was promoted through the Brahma Kumaris' international network of centres and through partner organisations. The organisation's later UN FAQ described the campaign as an observance of the International Year of Peace and said that Brahma Kumaris centres in seven countries received Peace Messenger Awards for their contribution.

== UN Peace Messenger Awards (1987) ==
In 1987 the Brahma Kumaris received United Nations Peace Messenger recognition connected with its International Year of Peace activities. The Brahma Kumaris' centres in seven countries received Peace Messenger Awards and described the recognition as the result of the Million Minutes of Peace appeal. A 2014 article in GMA News Online published a photograph captioned as Dadi Prakashmani receiving the United Nations' Peace Messenger Award from Secretary-General Javier Perez de Cuellar in 1987, and described her as a recipient of a United Nations Peace Medal.

The Peace Messenger awards of the 1980s should not be confused with the later United Nations Messengers of Peace programme, a separate celebrity-advocacy programme that began in 1997. In the Brahma Kumaris context, the 1987 recognition was tied to activities for the International Year of Peace and to the movement's civil-society relationship with the United Nations.

== Global Co-operation for a Better World (1988–1993) ==
The Brahma Kumaris launched Global Co-operation for a Better World in April 1988 at the Houses of Parliament in London as a follow-on to the Million Minutes of Peace appeal. The project asked participants to express their "vision of a better world" in written or visual form. According to the Brahma Kumaris, it reached people in 129 countries and gathered responses that were later synthesised into a publication, Visions of a Better World.

The project reflected the organisation's increasing emphasis, during the late 1980s and early 1990s, on public values education, interfaith contact and UN-related civic campaigns. Brahma Kumaris had launched the "Million Minutes of Peace Appeal" and "Global Cooperation for a Better World" as part of its peace initiatives, and linked those projects to the movement's later International Conference on Values for a Better World at Mount Abu.

== Visions of a Better World (1993) ==
The responses gathered through Global Co-operation for a Better World were published in 1993 as Visions of a Better World, described by the Brahma Kumaris as a United Nations Peace Messenger publication. The book became one of several Brahma Kumaris publications and programmes connected with values education in the 1990s, a field that later included Living Values: A Guidebook and the development of the Living Values Education initiative in consultation with UNICEF.

In February 1995 the Brahma Kumaris held the International Conference on Values for a Better World at Mount Abu, alongside the inauguration of the Academy for a Better World at Gyan Sarovar. Around 2,000 delegates from more than 60 countries attended, including government, education, health, media and religious representatives.

== Reception ==
Million Minutes of Peace and the later Better World projects as examples of the Brahma Kumaris' outward-facing public engagement rather than as independent peace organisations. The movement's late twentieth-century development was toward embracing a more public presence, in which meditation, values education and international outreach were presented in forms legible to wider audiences. The movement's UN status and public programmes was part of its wider internationalisation after the 1970s.

Million Minutes of Peace appeal was among the Brahma Kumaris' attempts to create public presence through vows, appeals, interfaith events and partnerships. The campaign asked people to commit time for prayer, positive thinking or meditation, and reports the 88-country and 1,231,975,713-minute figures.

== See also ==
- Brahma Kumaris
- Dadi Prakashmani
- Dadi Janki
- International Year of Peace
- Living Values Education
