= Atlantic Short Line Railway =

Overview
- Locale: Georgia, USA
- Dates of operation: 1892–1896
- Predecessor: Macon and Atlantic Railway
- Successor: Bruton and Pineora Railway

Technical
- Length: 29 mi (47 km)

The Atlantic Short Line Railway was chartered on May 24, 1890, and formed on December 9, 1892, from the failed Macon and Atlantic Railway. Leadership consisted of John R. Young, president, W.C. Hartridge, secretary and treasurer, and J.T. Millen, general superintendent. It managed to build a 29-mile (47 km) stretch of railroad east out of Brewton, Georgia, (spelled Bruton at the time) before going bankrupt. Allegations arose that the railway's directors sought to defraud investors by enabling a monopoly of rail transportation in Georgia led by Southern Railway. It was sold to the Central of Georgia Railway in 1896 and reorganized as the Bruton and Pineora Railway in 1897.
