= Lovett =

Lovett may refer to:

== Places ==
- Lovett, Georgia, USA, an unincorporated community in Laurens County
- Lovett, Indiana, USA, an unincorporated town
- Lovett Township, Jennings County, Indiana
- Lovett Bay, New South Wales, Australia
- Lovett Island, a river island in Tennessee
- Lovett Lake, Nova Scotia, Canada
- Lovett River, Alberta, Canada

== Other uses ==
- Lovett (surname)
- Lovett Purnell (born 1972), National Football League player
- The Lovett School, an independent school in Atlanta, Georgia, USA
- Lovett Tower, Canberra, Australia
- Lovett Baronets, an extinct title in the Baronetage of Great Britain

== See also ==
- Lovat (disambiguation)
- Levett
- Leavitt
