= J.W. McMillan =

J.W. McMillan may refer to:

- James W. McMillan (1825-1903), American soldier
- J.W. McMillan (brick manufacturer) (1850-1925), Scottish-American businessman
