= Cow Hell Swamp =

Swamp in the U.S. state of Georgia

- Swamp
- Location within Georgia Location within the United States
- Coordinates: 32°39′12″N 82°55′26″W
- Location: Laurens County, Georgia
- Part of: Oconee River

Area
  - Total: 2.22 mi^{2} (5.7 km^{2})
- Surface elevation: 53 m (174 ft)

Cow Hell Swamp (also called Cow Hell) is a swamp in the U.S. state of Georgia. The swamp is located along the eastern bank of the Oconee River near the mouth of Buckeye creek in northern Laurens County, with a small portion of the swamp extending north into the southern portion of Johnson County. Cow Hell Swamp is on the opposite side of the Oconee River from Beaverdam Swamp, located on the western bank of the Oconee River. Cow Hell Swamp has a surface area of approximately 2.22 mi^{2} (5.7 km^{2}) and a surface elevation of 174 ft (53 m) above sea level. The nearest town is Dublin, Georgia, the northernmost city limits of which is 9.3 mi (15.0 km) south of the swamp.

The swamp was named Cow Hell by nearby residents because cattle that ventured into the swamp from nearby farms would frequently get stuck in the bogs.

Cow Hell Swamp is a dense bottomland hardwood forest swamp filled with a large number of bald cypress trees. The nests of birds such as Eastern phoebes are often found in the swamp and its surrounding areas. The United States Geological Survey (USGS) mapping quadrangle that the swamp is contained in is also named Cow Hell Swamp. It includes parts of nearby Wilkinson and Johnson counties.

In the early 20th century, badly decomposed human remains were found in the swamp after a nearby farmer went missing while herding cows. The remains could not be identified and were buried in a nearby grave.
