= LVE =

LVE may refer to:

- Living Values Education, an educational program
- La Vie Electronique, a series of 3-disc CD releases by Klaus Schulze
- Los Verdes Ecologistas, a green political party in Spain
- Los Verdes Ecopacifistas, an ecologist political party in Spain
- Leighton Vander Esch, an American football player
