= Cedar Grove, Laurens County, Georgia =

Unincorporated community in Georgia, U.S.

Coordinates: 32°15′01″N 82°52′56″W

Cedar Grove is an unincorporated community in Laurens County, in the U.S. state of Georgia.

== History ==
The Georgia General Assembly incorporated the place as the "Town of Cedar Grove" in 1908. The community was named for a grove of cedar trees near the original town site. The town's charter was formally dissolved in 1918.
