= Scott, Georgia =

Unincorporated community in Georgia, U.S.

Coordinates: 32°33′07″N 82°40′00″W

Scott is an unincorporated community in Johnson County, in the U.S. state of Georgia.

== History ==
A post office called Scott was established in 1897, and remained in operation until 1957. Scott also had a hospital, train station, jail, and a grocery store. It is unknown why the name "Scott" was applied to this place.

The Georgia General Assembly incorporated Scott as a town in 1904. The town's municipal charter was repealed in 1995.

As a young boy in the late 1940s and 1950s, I spent most of my summers living with relatives in Scott. I recall two different versions of how Scott was named. The most believed version was that Scott was originally settled by a small group of Scottish immigrants, who had broken off from a larger group of Irish immigrants settling about 15 miles away and creating what became Dublin. A less popular, and not widely believed, version of how Scott was named was from hearing railroad engineers yelling "scatt" to scare cattle off the railroad that ran thru the town.

Born in 1943, I recall from my grandparents and great grandparents that neither Laurens County, or neighboring Johnson County. embraced slavery when they settled here because their home country, Ireland and Scotland were against it.
