= J. W. McMillan (brick manufacturer) =

Scottish brick manufacturer in the American South

J. W. McMillan (5 May 1850 – 16 December 1925) was an industrialist and brick supplier. Born in Glasgow, Scotland, McMillan moved to the United States, where he produced bricks in the American South.

== Early life and immigration to America ==
J.W. McMillian was born in Scotland in 1850, into a Presbyterian family. McMillian subsequently immigrated to the United States, living in Philadelphia, Pennsylvania for a time. He then moved to Madison, Georgia, where he supplied bricks for the Georgia State Sanitarium.

=== Milledgeville Brick Works ===
McMillian later moved to Milledgeville, Georgia, where he established the Milledgeville Brick Works. The Brick Works had six kilns and produced as many as 2,000 bricks per day. Buildings constructed with McMillan's bricks in Milledgeville include the First Presbyterian Church in downtown Milledgeville on South Wayne Street, the original barracks on the campus of Georgia Military College on Greene Street, Old Baldwin County Courthouse (1886), the Jones Building for Central State Hospital,

The brick factory was located along the Oconee River, site of the Oconee River Greenway. It operated until the early 1940s.

=== Terra cotta burial markers ===
Terracotta burial markers found around Milledgeville cemeteries are believed to be from African Americans working at the McMillan brick factory and other local brick factories, or by those working at some of Georgia's southern stoneware potteries. Archaeologists have studied the markers.
