= St. Joseph's Polish Catholic Church =

Historic church in New Jersey, United States

St. Joseph Church
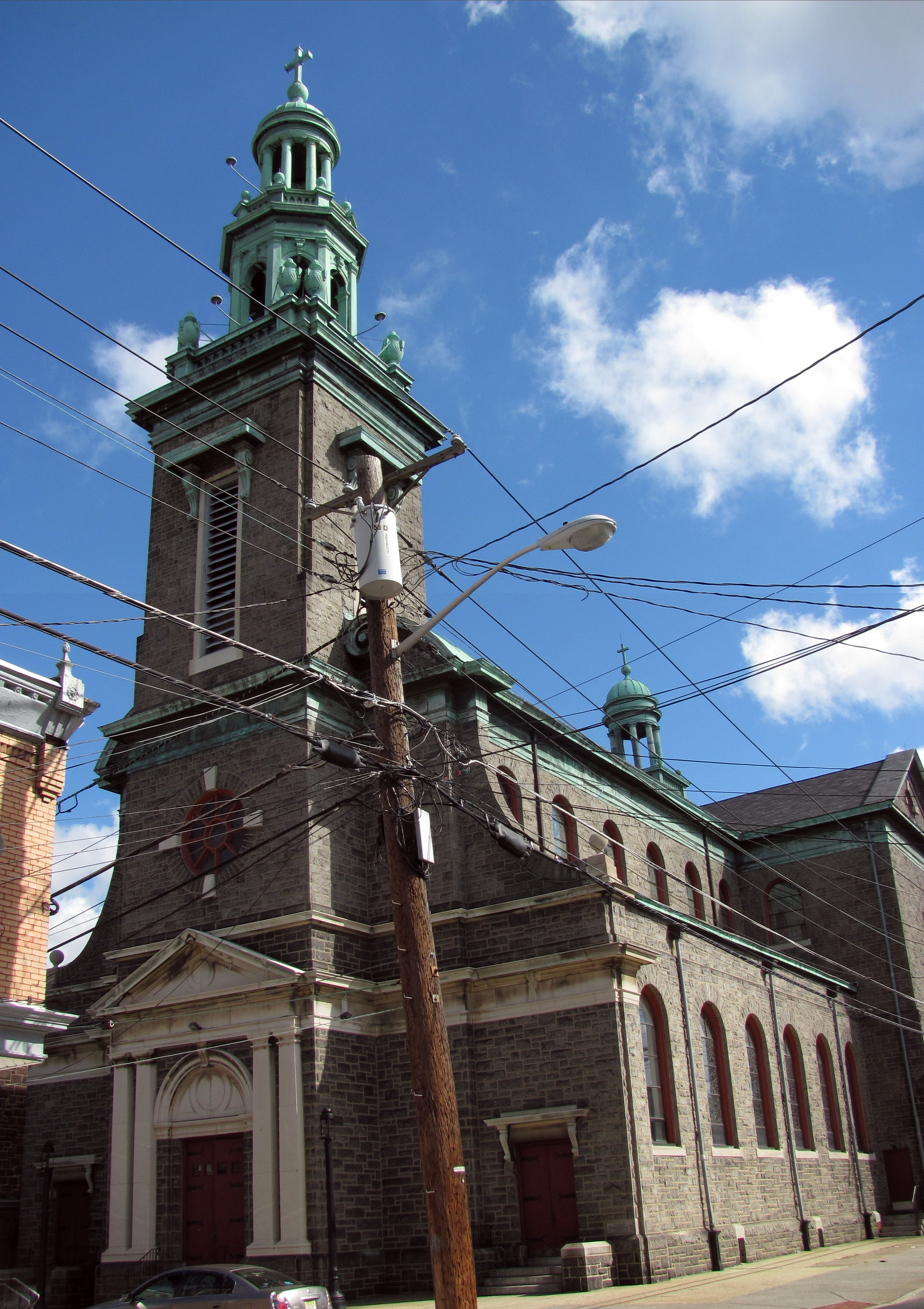
- St. Joseph Polish Catholic Church
- St. Joseph Church
- 39°55′49″N 75°6′36″W
- Location: 1010 Liberty Street, Camden, New Jersey
- Country: United States
- Denomination: Roman Catholic

History
- Founder: Polish immigrants
- Dedication: St. Joseph
- Dedicated: May 1914

Architecture
- Architect: George I. Lovatt, Sr.
- Architectural type: Late 19th And 20th Century Revivals
- Groundbreaking: 1913

- St. Joseph's Polish Catholic Church
- U.S. National Register of Historic Places
- Location within Camden County, New Jersey Location within New Jersey Location within the United States
- Location: 1010 Liberty Street, Camden, New Jersey
- Area: 1 acre (0.40 ha)
- Built: 1913-1914
- NRHP reference No.: 03001307
- Added to NRHP: December 18, 2003

St. Joseph's Polish Catholic Church (Polish: Kościół Świętego Józefa) is a historic Roman Catholic church at 1010 Liberty Street in Camden, Camden County, New Jersey, United States. It is one of two churches in Camden named St. Joseph. The other is St. Joseph Pro-Cathedral.

== History ==
The parish was started by a group of Polish immigrants in 1891 and incorporated the following year on October 24. The parish rented a building on Broadway to use as a church. Land was bought at Tenth and Liberty Streets and a combination church and school was completed in 1895. George I. Lovatt, Sr., a Philadelphia architect, designed the present church in the Baroque style. Construction was begun in 1913 and the church was dedicated in May 1914. The church building cost $100,000 to build. The interior was painted in 1923 for $15,000. The stained-glass windows were donated as memorials over the years.

== Architecture ==
The exterior of the structure is covered in gray Vermont granite. A Romanesque style entrance is located in the tower. The building is cruciform in shape. There are three bells in the tower: Mary (quarter-ton), John (half-ton) and Adalbert (one-ton). The bells were dedicated on December 2, 1917.

The interior of the church features a 63-foot (19.2 m) nave and an apse that is crowned by a half-rounded cupola above the main altar. There are two side altars in nitches that flank the main altar. A choir loft is above the main entrance. The church has a seating capacity of 1,000 people.

== See also ==
- National Register of Historic Places listings in Camden County, New Jersey
