= Laurie Hill =

Laurie Hill may refer to:

- Laurie Hill (footballer, born 1942) (1942–2014), Australian rules footballer
- Laurie Hill (footballer, born 1970), American-born Mexican international soccer player
- the title character of Laurie Hill (TV series), an American television series

== See also ==
- Lauren Hill (disambiguation)
