= Donovan, Georgia =

- Unincorporated community
- Location within the state of Georgia Donovan, Georgia (the United States)
- Coordinates: 32°46′17″N 82°42′46″W
- Country: United States
- State: Georgia
- County: Johnson
- Elevation: 371 ft (113 m)
- Time zone: UTC-5 (Eastern (EST))
  - Summer (DST): UTC-4 (EDT)
- Area code: 478
- GNIS ID: 331570

Donovan is an unincorporated community in Johnson County, Georgia, United States.
