= Nameless, Georgia =

Unincorporated community in Georgia, U.S.

Coordinates: 32°23′14″N 83°04′20″W

Nameless is an unincorporated community in Laurens County, in the U.S. state of Georgia.

== History ==
The town's name of Nameless was selected when all other names submitted to postal authorities were rejected. A post office was then established as Nameless in 1886, and remained in operation until being discontinued in 1901.
