= Dublin micropolitan area, Georgia =

Dublin micropolitan area
- Micropolitan statistical area
- Dublin, GA micropolitan statistical area
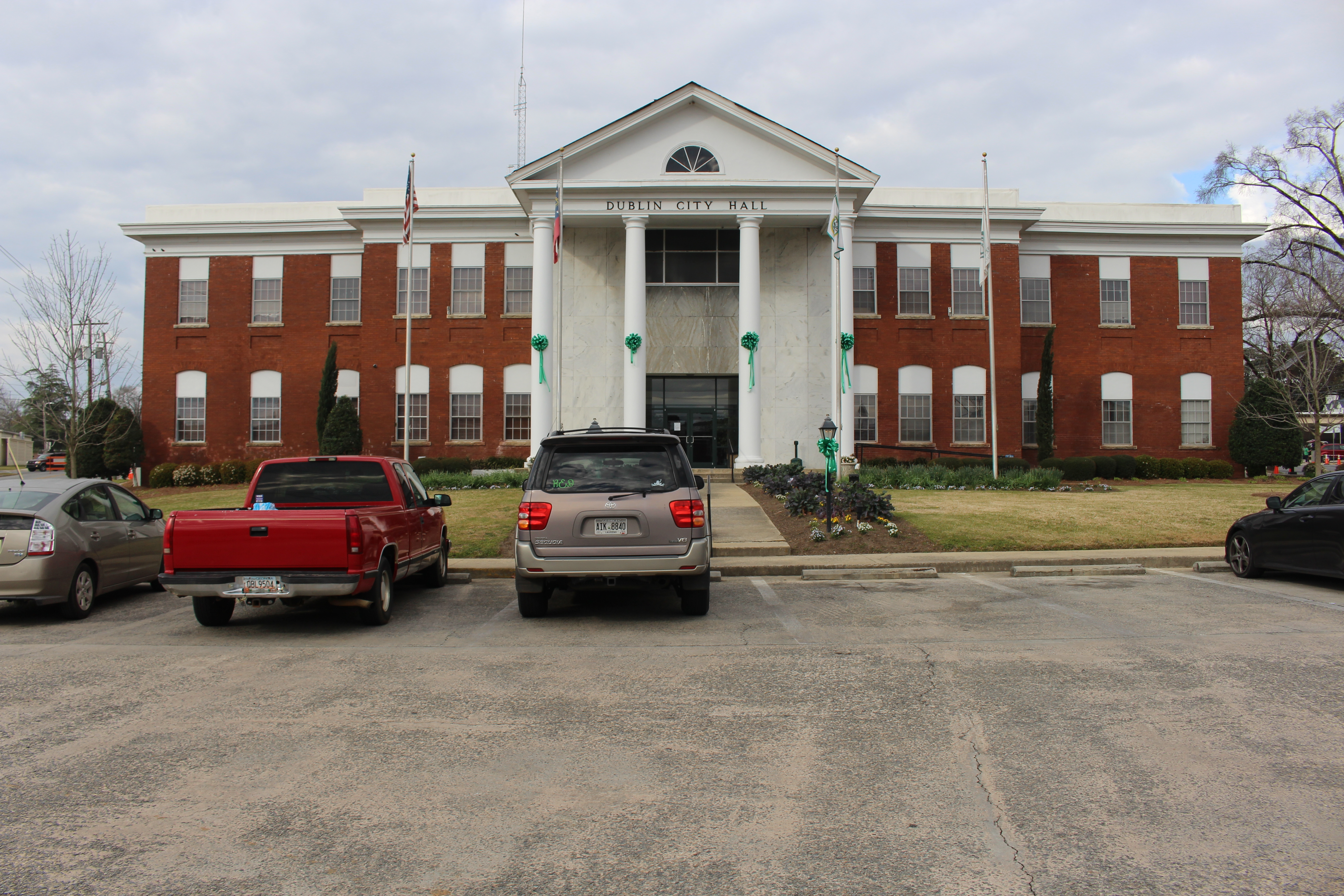
- Dublin City Hall
Interactive Map of Dublin, GA μSA
City of Dublin
Dublin, GA μSA
- Country: United States
- State: Georgia
- Principal city: Dublin
- Time zone: UTC−5 (EST)
  - Summer (DST): UTC−4 (EDT)

The Dublin micropolitan statistical area, as defined by the United States Census Bureau, is an area consisting of two counties in Georgia, anchored by the city of Dublin.

At the 2000 census, the micropolitan area had a population of 53,434; on July 1, 2009 the population was estimated at 57,595. In 2020, it sat at a population of around 65,903.

== Counties ==
- Johnson
- Laurens

== Communities ==
- Cities
  - Adrian (partial)
  - Dublin (Principal city)
  - Dudley
  - East Dublin
  - Wrightsville
- Towns
  - Allentown (partial)
  - Cadwell
  - Dexter
  - Kite
  - Montrose
  - Rentz
- Unincorporated Communities
  - Lovett
  - Meeks

== Demographics ==
As of the census of 2000, there were 53,434 people, 20,213 households, and 14,421 families residing within the μSA. The racial makeup of the μSA was 63.28% White, 34.92% African American, 0.19% Native American, 0.69% Asian, 0.03% Pacific Islander, 0.34% from other races, and 0.55% from two or more races. Hispanic or Latino of any race were 1.14% of the population.

The median income for a household in the μSA was $27,929, and the median income for a family was $34,125. Males had a median income of $29,182 versus $19,941 for females. The per capita income for the μSA was $14,574.

== See also ==
- Georgia census statistical areas
