= Tweed, Georgia =

Unincorporated community in Georgia, U.S.

Coordinates: 32°25′45″N 82°45′28″W

Tweed is an unincorporated community in Laurens County, in the U.S. state of Georgia.

== History ==
A post office called Tweed was established in 1880, and remained in operation until 1904. The community's name most likely is a transfer from the River Tweed, in Scotland.
