= Bruton and Pineora Railway =

Railway in Georgia, United States of America

Incorporated on 27 June 1897, the Bruton and Pineora Railway (B&P) was controlled by the Central of Georgia Railway, which took over the former Atlantic Short Line Railway, which had gone bankrupt. The B&P ran from Statesboro to Brewton (spelling changed from Bruton in 1895) for a total of 67 miles.

The Central of Georgia fully purchased the B&P in 1901.
