= Laurens County, Georgia =

County in Georgia, United States

- County
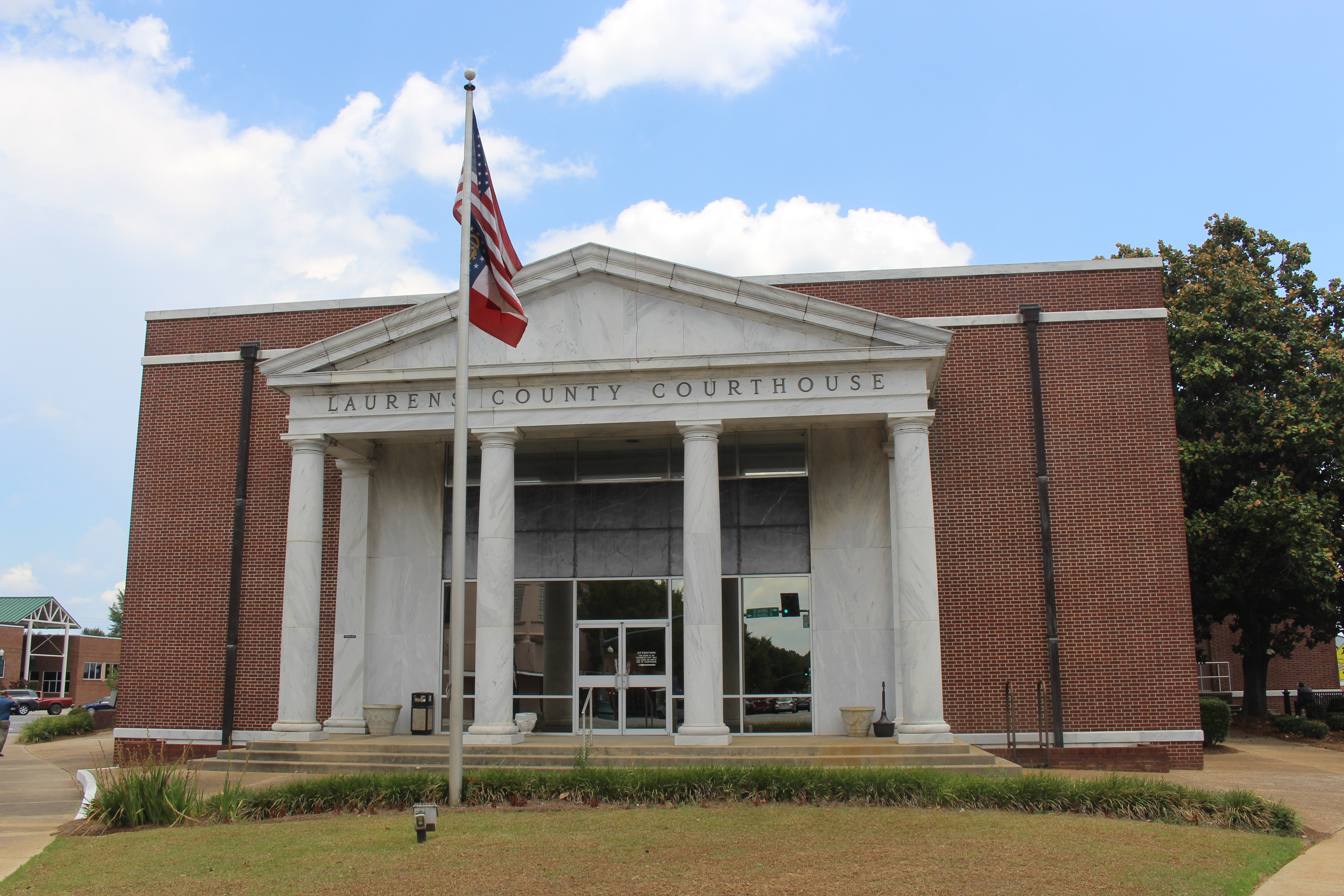
- Laurens County Courthouse in Dublin

- Seal

- Location within the U.S. state of Georgia
- Coordinates: 32°28′N 82°56′W
- Country: United States
- State: Georgia
- Founded: December 10, 1807; 218 years ago
- Named for: John Laurens
- Seat: Dublin
- Largest city: Dublin

Area
  - Total: 818 sq mi (2,120 km^{2})
  - Land: 807 sq mi (2,090 km^{2})
  - Water: 11 sq mi (28 km^{2}) 1.4%

Population (2020)
  - Total: 49,570
  - Estimate (2025): 51,041 ▲
  - Density: 60/sq mi (23/km^{2})
- Time zone: UTC−5 (Eastern)
  - Summer (DST): UTC−4 (EDT)
- Congressional district: 12th
- Website: www.laurenscoga.org

Laurens County is a county located in the central part of the U.S. state of Georgia. As of the 2020 census, the population was 49,570, up from 48,434 in 2010. The county seat is Dublin. The county was founded on December 10, 1807, and named after Lieutenant Colonel John Laurens, an American soldier and statesman from South Carolina during the American Revolutionary War.

Laurens County is part of the Dublin micropolitan statistical area.

== History ==
Laurens County was formed on December 10, 1807, from portions of Wilkinson and Washington Counties. During the Red Summer of 1919, racial tensions increased in the area, leading to the Laurens County, Georgia race riot of 1919.

== Geography ==
According to the U.S. Census Bureau, the county has a total area of 818 square miles (2,120 km^{2}), of which 807 square miles (2,090 km^{2}) is land and 11 square miles (28 km^{2}) (1.4%) is water. It is the third-largest county in Georgia by land area and fourth-largest by total area.

The majority of Laurens County is located in the Lower Oconee River sub-basin of the Altamaha River basin. The southwestern corner of the county, defined by a line that runs west from Chester through Rentz to U.S. Route 441, and then southeast toward Glenwood, is located in the Little Ocmulgee River sub-basin of the same Altamaha River basin. A small and narrow sliver of the eastern edge of the county, from east of Lovett to northeast of Rockledge, is located in the Ohoopee River sub-basin of the larger Altamaha River basin. The county has several swamps along with Oconee river including Cow Hell Swamp.

=== Major highways ===
- I-16 / SR 404 (unsigned)
- US 80
- US 319 / SR 31
- US 441
  - US 441 Byp. (around Dublin)
- SR 19
- SR 26
- SR 29
- SR 46
- SR 86
- SR 117
- SR 126
- SR 199
- SR 257
- SR 278
- SR 338

=== Adjacent counties ===
- Johnson County – northeast
- Treutlen County – east
- Wheeler County – south
- Dodge County – southwest
- Bleckley County – west
- Wilkinson County – northwest
- Twiggs County – northwest

== Communities ==
=== Cities ===
- Allentown
- Dublin
- Dudley
- East Dublin

=== Towns ===
- Cadwell
- Dexter
- Montrose
- Rentz

=== Unincorporated communities ===
- Alcorns
- Alligood
- Baston
- Brewton
- Catlin
- Cedar Grove
- Chappells Mill
- Condor
- Five Points
- Garretta
- Harlow
- Haskins Crossing
- Holly Hills
- Kewanee
- Laurens Hill
- Lollie
- Lovett
- Lowery
- Midway
- Minter
- Moores
- Nameless
- Old Condor
- Rockledge
- Shewmake
- Spring Hill
- Tuckers Crossroad
- Tweed
- Vincent
- Whipples Crossing

=== Ghost towns ===
- Bender

== Demographics ==
Historical population
Census	Pop.	Note	%±
1810	2,210		—
1820	5,436		146.0%
1830	5,589		2.8%
1840	5,585		−0.1%
1850	6,442		15.3%
1860	6,998		8.6%
1870	7,834		11.9%
1880	10,053		28.3%
1890	13,747		36.7%
1900	25,908		88.5%
1910	35,501		37.0%
1920	39,605		11.6%
1930	32,693		−17.5%
1940	33,606		2.8%
1950	33,123		−1.4%
1960	32,313		−2.4%
1970	32,738		1.3%
1980	36,990		13.0%
1990	39,988		8.1%
2000	44,874		12.2%
2010	48,434		7.9%
2020	49,570		2.3%
2025 (est.)	51,041	▲	3.0%
U.S. Decennial Census; 1790-1880 1890-1910; 1920-1930 1930-1940; 1940-1950 1960-1980; 1980-2000 2010 2020

=== Racial and ethnic composition ===
Laurens County, Georgia – Racial and ethnic composition Note: the US Census treats Hispanic/Latino as an ethnic category. This table excludes Latinos from the racial categories and assigns them to a separate category. Hispanics/Latinos may be of any race.
Race / Ethnicity (NH = Non-Hispanic)	Pop 1980	Pop 1990	Pop 2000	Pop 2010	Pop 2020	% 1980	% 1990	% 2000	% 2010	% 2020
White alone (NH)	24,569	26,395	28,199	28,920	27,881	66.42%	66.01%	62.84%	59.71%	56.25%
Black or African American alone (NH)	12,009	13,235	15,417	17,268	18,219	32.47%	33.10%	34.36%	35.65%	36.75%
Native American or Alaska Native alone (NH)	11	35	80	87	80	0.03%	0.09%	0.18%	0.18%	0.16%
Asian alone (NH)	74	135	361	478	507	0.20%	0.34%	0.80%	0.99%	1.02%
Native Hawaiian or Pacific Islander alone (NH)	x	x	12	4	14	x	x	0.03%	0.01%	0.03%
Other race alone (NH)	6	8	44	41	141	0.02%	0.02%	0.10%	0.08%	0.28%
Mixed race or Multiracial (NH)	x	x	232	493	1,304	x	x	0.52%	1.02%	2.63%
Hispanic or Latino (any race)	321	180	529	1,143	1,424	0.87%	0.45%	1.18%	2.36%	2.87%
Total	36,990	39,988	44,874	48,434	49,570	100.00%	100.00%	100.00%	100.00%	100.00%

=== 2020 census ===
As of the 2020 census, there were 49,570 people living in 19,501 households, including 11,549 families in the county. The median age was 40.6 years; 23.9% of residents were under the age of 18 and 18.6% of residents were 65 years of age or older. For every 100 females there were 91.6 males, and for every 100 females age 18 and over there were 88.3 males age 18 and over. 42.0% of residents lived in urban areas, while 58.0% lived in rural areas.

The racial makeup of the county was 56.8% White, 37.0% Black or African American, 0.2% American Indian and Alaska Native, 1.0% Asian, 0.0% Native Hawaiian and Pacific Islander, 1.6% from some other race, and 3.4% from two or more races. Hispanic or Latino residents of any race comprised 2.9% of the population.

Of the 19,501 households, 31.6% had children under the age of 18 living with them and 33.2% had a female householder with no spouse or partner present. About 28.8% of all households were made up of individuals and 12.7% had someone living alone who was 65 years of age or older.

There were 21,924 housing units, of which 11.1% were vacant. Among occupied housing units, 63.4% were owner-occupied and 36.6% were renter-occupied. The homeowner vacancy rate was 0.9% and the rental vacancy rate was 7.4%.

== Education ==
Laurens County School District operates the county's public schools.

== Notable people ==
- Karl Slover, one of the oldest living Munchkins from Wizard of Oz (1939 film).
- Demaryius Thomas, wide receiver for the Denver Broncos
- Anthony Johnson, mixed martial artist for the Ultimate Fighting Championship(UFC)

== Politics ==
As of the 2020s, Laurens County is a Republican stronghold, voting 66% for Donald Trump in 2024. For elections to the United States House of Representatives, Laurens County is part of Georgia's 12th congressional district, currently represented by Rick Allen. For elections to the Georgia State Senate, Laurens County is part of District 20. For elections to the Georgia House of Representatives, Laurens County is part of District 155.

United States presidential election results for Laurens County, Georgia
Year	Republican		Democratic		Third party(ies)	
Year	No.	%	No.	%	No.	%
1912	92	7.52%	1,107	90.52%	24	1.96%
1916	143	9.69%	1,269	85.98%	64	4.34%
1920	350	23.07%	1,167	76.93%	0	0.00%
1924	121	9.31%	1,127	86.76%	51	3.93%
1928	470	19.13%	1,987	80.87%	0	0.00%
1932	38	1.71%	2,188	98.25%	1	0.04%
1936	304	10.37%	2,620	89.39%	7	0.24%
1940	435	15.79%	2,316	84.07%	4	0.15%
1944	498	16.37%	2,544	83.63%	0	0.00%
1948	268	7.05%	2,325	61.12%	1,211	31.83%
1952	1,046	17.30%	5,001	82.70%	0	0.00%
1956	1,189	18.95%	5,085	81.05%	0	0.00%
1960	1,884	28.84%	4,648	71.16%	0	0.00%
1964	5,457	58.76%	3,828	41.22%	2	0.02%
1968	2,738	21.33%	3,451	26.88%	6,649	51.79%
1972	7,350	77.53%	2,130	22.47%	0	0.00%
1976	3,281	27.58%	8,617	72.42%	0	0.00%
1980	4,392	35.07%	7,860	62.76%	271	2.16%
1984	7,181	56.76%	5,471	43.24%	0	0.00%
1988	6,929	57.89%	4,879	40.76%	162	1.35%
1992	6,146	43.72%	6,184	43.99%	1,729	12.30%
1996	6,118	47.79%	5,792	45.24%	893	6.97%
2000	8,133	57.94%	5,724	40.78%	179	1.28%
2004	10,883	63.05%	6,281	36.39%	97	0.56%
2008	12,052	60.37%	7,769	38.92%	142	0.71%
2012	11,950	60.85%	7,513	38.26%	176	0.90%
2016	12,411	63.33%	6,752	34.46%	433	2.21%
2020	14,493	63.76%	8,074	35.52%	164	0.72%
2024	15,460	66.20%	7,820	33.49%	72	0.31%

United States Senate election results for Laurens County, Georgia2
Year	Republican		Democratic		Third party(ies)	
Year	No.	%	No.	%	No.	%
2020	14,363	63.91%	7,698	34.25%	413	1.84%
2020	12,855	63.50%	7,389	36.50%	0	0.00%

United States Senate election results for Laurens County, Georgia3
Year	Republican		Democratic		Third party(ies)	
Year	No.	%	No.	%	No.	%
2020	6,762	30.29%	5,334	23.89%	10,229	45.82%
2020	12,806	63.27%	7,435	36.73%	0	0.00%
2022	14,681	68.03%	6,285	29.12%	615	2.85%
2022	11,355	65.20%	6,060	34.80%	0	0.00%

Georgia Gubernatorial election results for Laurens County
Year	Republican		Democratic		Third party(ies)	
Year	No.	%	No.	%	No.	%
2022	12,508	67.43%	5,973	32.20%	69	0.37%

== See also ==
- National Register of Historic Places listings in Laurens County, Georgia
- List of counties in Georgia
