= Lovett, Georgia =

Unincorporated community in Georgia, U.S.

Coordinates: 32°38′18″N 82°46′03″W

Lovett is an unincorporated community in eastern Laurens County, Georgia, United States. It is part of the Dublin Micropolitan Statistical Area.

== History ==
Lovett had its start in 1884 when the railroad was extended to that point. The community was named after Warren P. Lovett, a railroad official.

The Georgia General Assembly incorporated Lovett as a town in 1889. The town's municipal charter was repealed in 1995.
