= Meeks, Georgia =

Unincorporated community in Georgia, U.S.

Coordinates: 32°37′08″N 82°33′24″W

Meeks is an unincorporated community in Johnson County, in the U.S. state of Georgia.

== History ==
The first permanent settlement at Meeks was made ca. 1888. A post office called Meeks was established in 1893, and remained in operation until 1954. The community has the name of Henry Meeks, an early settler.
