= Oconee River Greenway =

Trail in Milledgeville, Georgia

Coordinates: 33.9435°N 83.3618°W

The Oconee River Greenway is a trail along the Oconee River in Milledgeville, Georgia. It opened in 2008. It includes fishing areas, paved trails for bicycles and foot traffic, and a boat ramp. River flow can change rapidly due to operations of a Georgia Power plant upstream of the Greenway. Recent trail expansion connects the Greenway to Flagg Chapel and Memory Hill Cemetery.
