= Tom Lovatt-Williams =

English poet and writer

Tom Lovatt-Williams, often known as T. Lovatt Williams, (28 May 1897 – 22 September 1986) was an English poet and writer about railways and nature topics.

Thomas Lovatt-Williams was born in the English town of Ellesmere, Shropshire. His career began on the railways and having gained an engineering apprenticeship at Crewe, he became Works Manager at various places on the LNWR system, and later the LMS. He was Manager at Wolverton Carriage and Wagon Works before he retired at an early age when nationalisation of the railways took place.

His best-known poem, "Oxford", was broadcast several times on the BBC programme "Poetry Please", and is included in the published anthology of favourite poems from that programme. His novel The Gentle Years was read on the BBC's Book at Bedtime by Richard Harris. What was not publicised at the time was that it was based on his childhood experiences at Ellesmere, near Oswestry, where he was born. He was a regular contributor of nature notes and poetry to many magazines including The Lady, The AutoCar, and The Countryman.

He then concentrated full-time on healing as a Christian Science practitioner; and was also a frequent contributor to Christian Science magazines.

He was a prolific painter in oils, and was also a talented pianist with many compositions to his name, especially for children. He was playing the organ at church services at the age of 13. His improvisations on both piano and organ were inspiring.
