= Lovat =

Lovat may refer to:

- A colour of Scottish tweed
- River Lovat, a river in England
- Lovat (river), a river in Belarus and Russia
- Lord Lovat, a title in the Peerage of Scotland
- Lovat Scouts, British Army unit
- Lovat Shinty Club, a shinty club from Kiltarlity, Scotland
- LOVAT Inc., a Canadian company which manufactures and markets tunnel boring machines (TBMs)
- Lucas Lovat (born 1997), Brazilian footballer
- Terry Lovat, Australian academic
