= Oconee River =

River in the state of Georgia, U.S.

Coordinates: 31°57′35″N 82°32′37″W

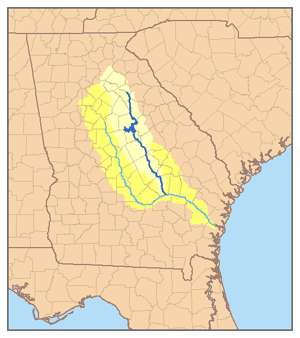
Map of the Altamaha River system with Oconee highlighted

The Oconee River is a 220-mile-long (350 km) river in the U.S. state of Georgia. Its origin is in Hall County and it terminates where it joins the Ocmulgee River to form the Altamaha River near Lumber City at the borders of Montgomery County, Wheeler County, and Jeff Davis County. South of Athens, two forks, known as the Middle Oconee River and North Oconee River, which flow for 55–65 miles (89–105 km) upstream, converge to form the Oconee River. Milledgeville, the former capital city of Georgia, lies on the Oconee River.

The Oconee River Greenway along the Oconee River in Milledgeville opened in 2008; the North Oconee River Greenway is in Athens, Georgia. J.W. McMillan's brick factory was located along the river.

== Course ==
The Oconee River begins at the confluence of the North Oconee River and the Middle Oconee River on the border of Athens–Clarke and Oconee counties. Those tributaries both have their headwaters to the east of Lake Lanier in Hall County. South of Athens, the Oconee River passes through the Oconee National Forest into Lake Oconee, a man made lake, near the towns of Madison and Greensboro off Interstate 20. From Lake Oconee, the river travels to Lake Sinclair, another manmade lake near Milledgeville, the town founded on Georgia's Fall Line and former state capital. South of Milledgeville, the river flows unobstructed until merging with the Ocmulgee River to form the Altamaha River. Along the river there are many sandbars and oxbow lakes while the forest bottomland swamp surrounding the Oconee extends for miles, creating a very remote setting. Swamps along the Oconee river include Cow Hell Swamp in Laurens County.

== Names and etymology ==
The river's name derives from the Oconee, a former Muskogean polity in central Georgia. The Oconee lived in present-day Baldwin County at a settlement known as Oconee Old Town, later moving to the Chattahoochee River in the early 18th century. The name exists in several variations, including Ocone, Oconi, Ocony, and Ekwoni.

Early in the period of European settlement of the region, the North Oconee was known as the Etoho and the Middle Oconee the Tishmaugu.

There is no South Oconee River, but that name was used first for what is now the Middle Oconee, while the name Middle Oconee was first applied to what is now Walnut Fork (or Walnut Creek) northeast of Jefferson. Subsequently, the name South Oconee River was applied to another Oconee tributary, the Apalachee, but by the 19th century, the name South Oconee was no longer in wide use.

== River pollution ==
One of the main sources of pollution comes from fecal coliform bacteria, several species of bacteria found in human and animal feces. Fecal coliform bacteria enter the river through a number of sources; storm-water runoff leaving farmlands, storm-water runoff carrying pet waste, leaking septic and sewer lines contaminating surface or groundwater, and sewer spills throughout the watershed. Fecal coliform bacteria can be deadly to humans if ingested or acquired through an open wound. Fish caught in the Oconee Basin may be eaten if cooked thoroughly.

The second biggest form of pollution in the river is fertilizer. Nitrogen in fertilizer in the form of nitrates or ammonia, measured in parts per million, is found in regularly collected samples. These forms of nitrogen stimulate abundant growth of algae in the water.

The third largest source of pollution is sedimentation, typically caused by construction and urbanization.

== Crossings ==
Crossings of the Oconee River include:

- Oconee River Bridge, east of Downtown Milledgeville, site of American Civil War resistance of the Fourth Kentucky Regiment, plus a unit of convicts from the Milledgeville penitentiary and a battalion of Georgia Military Institute cadets vs. a Union army corps (part of Sherman's March to the Sea).
- The Herschel Lovett Bridge is a steel girder bridge over the Oconee River along the Dublin–East Dublin city line. It carries US 80/US 319/SR 26/SR 29/SR 31. The bridge was named for Herschel Lovett, a Dublin businessman and politician.
