= George I. Lovatt Sr. =

American architect

George I. Lovatt Sr
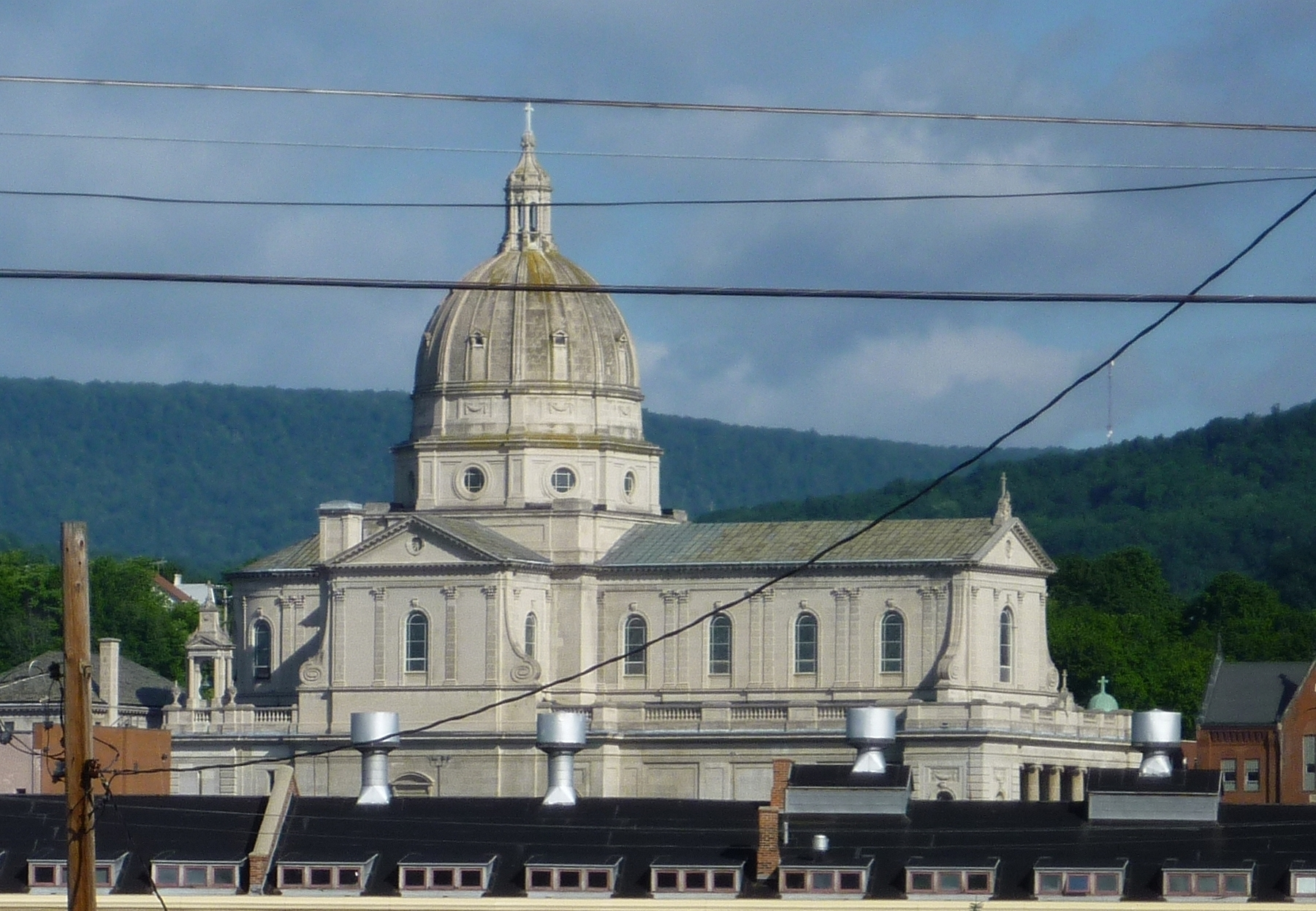
- Cathedral of the Blessed Sacrament; Altoona Pennsylvania
- Born: 1872
- Died: 1958 (aged 85–86)
- Known for: George I. Lovatt Sr, Architect

George I. Lovatt Sr. (February 13, 1872 – September 5, 1958) was an American architect who designed numerous Roman Catholic churches in Eastern Pennsylvania, New Jersey, and elsewhere during the late 19th and early 20th centuries.

== Childhood and architectural education ==
George Ignatius Lovatt Sr. was born on February 13, 1872, in Philadelphia County, Pennsylvania. He studied at the Pennsylvania Museum and School of Industrial Art during the academic terms 1890/91 and 1892/93. His first documented commission resulted from the death of Adrian Worthington Smith, who had begun work on the Monastery of the Visitation (now demolished) in Wilmington, Delaware. Following Smith's death in 1892, Lovatt completed the convent and continued his studies at the PMSI at the same time. In 1894 he established an architectural practice in Philadelphia, with offices at 424 Walnut Street.

== Practice ==
Lovatt proved to be a formidable competitor for the considerable Catholic church work which was initiated in the time. Although Edwin Forrest Durang and Henry D. Dagit designed a number of Catholic church and institutional buildings, Durang's firm moved to New York City in the 1930s, leaving Dagit, Lovatt, and the Hoffman-Henon firm to divide major Catholic commissions.

Lovatt's firm received both local and national honors, including a commendation for the Church of the Most Precious Blood, Philadelphia, in 1926 at the International Exhibition held in Barcelona, Spain. He followed this honor in 1930 by winning the Philadelphia Chapter of the AIA's gold medal for his Church of the Holy Child, Philadelphia. In 1927 he was joined in the firm by his son George I. Lovatt Jr., but did not retire until 1940. He died September 5, 1958, in Darby, Delaware County, Pennsylvania.

== Works include ==
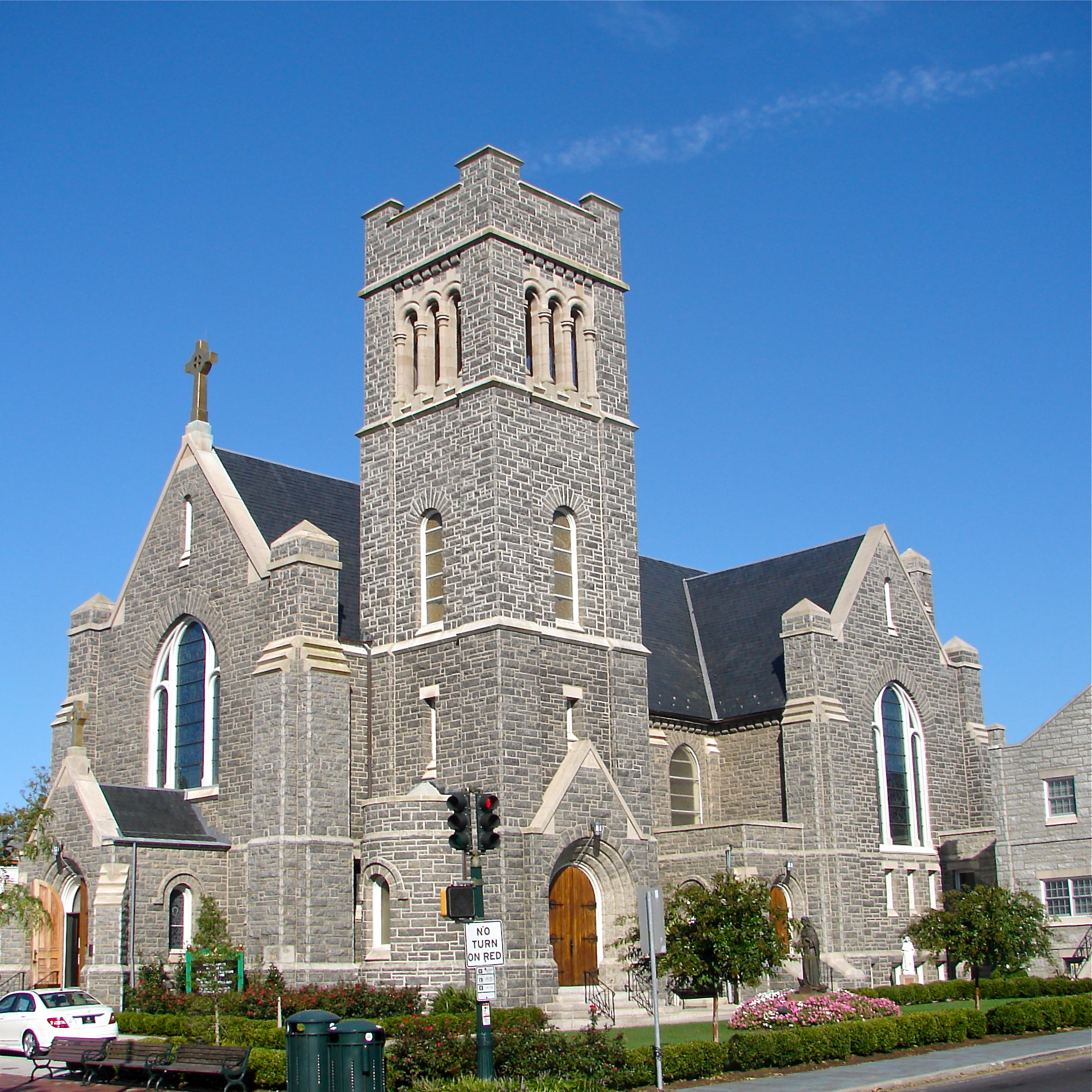
Our Lady Star of the Sea Church, Cape May

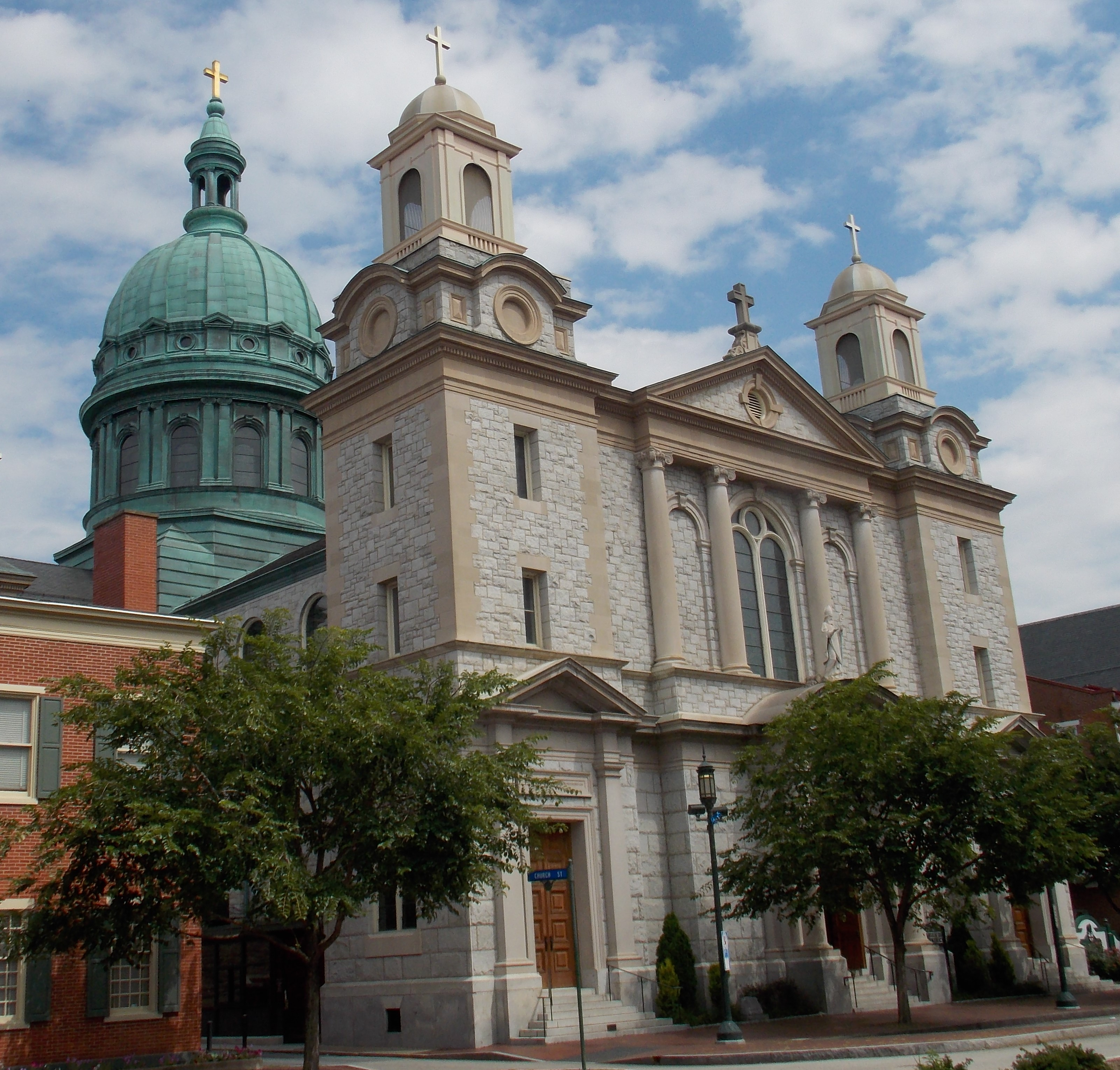
Cathedral of Saint Patrick, Harrisburg

- Cathedral of the Blessed Sacrament, Altoona, Pennsylvania
- Holy Spirit Church, Asbury Park, New Jersey
- Ascension Church, Bradley Beach, New Jersey
- St. Joseph Church, Camden, New Jersey
- Holy Name Church, Camden, New Jersey
- Our Lady Star of the Sea Church, Cape May, New Jersey
- Church of The Immaculate Heart of Mary, Chester, Pennsylvania
- St. John Church, Collingswood, New Jersey
- Sacred Heart of Jesus Church, Cornwall, Pennsylvania
- St. Elizabeth Church and Convent, Cornwells Heights, Pennsylvania
- Blessed Virgin Mary Church, Darby, Pennsylvania
- St. Andrew Church, Drexel Hill, Pennsylvania
- St. Joseph Church, Equality, Illinois
- Assumption Church, Hackettstown, New Jersey
- Cathedral of Saint Patrick in Harrisburg, Harrisburg, Pennsylvania
- St. Mary Magdeline Church, Millville, New Jersey
- Holy Saviour Church, Norristown, Pennsylvania
- Immaculate Conception Church, Philadelphia
- Holy Angels Church, Philadelphia
- Holy Cross Church, Philadelphia
- St. Anthony of Padua Church, Philadelphia
- St. Bridgit Church, Philadelphia
- St. Agnes Church, Philadelphia
- St. Aloysius Church, Philadelphia
- St. Ambrose Church, Philadelphia
- Our Lady of Hope (Holy Child) Church, Philadelphia
- St. Leo Church, Philadelphia
- Acts of the Apostles (former) Church, Philadelphia
- Sacred Heart Church, Phoenixville, Pennsylvania
- St. Ann Church, Wildwood, New Jersey
- Sacred Heart of Jesus Church, Williamstown, Pennsylvania
- St. Philomena Church, Lansdowne, Pennsylvania,
- St. Ann Church, Wilmington, Delaware
- St. Elisabeth Church, Wilmington, Delaware
- St. Joseph Church, Wilmington, Delaware
- St. Peter Church, Columbia, South Carolina
