= Living Values Education =

The Living Values Education Approach (LVE) is a way of conceptualising education that promotes the development of values-based learning communities and places the search for meaning and purpose at the heart of education. It is run by Association for Living Values Education International (ALIVE), a non-profit organisation in Geneva, Switzerland which creates LVE professional development courses for children, educators, youth and parents as well as street children and other at-risk groups.

In addition to practical activities in group settings workshops, classroom activity and study groups, there are also LVE Online Correspondence Courses.

As of November 2018, LVE had 30 member organisations ("Associates") and 15 individual Focal Points for LVE, with about 40 countries using the LVE Approach.

== Structure ==
ALIVE was founded in 2004 as an international coordinating organization for the LVE Approach. Drawing on a strong volunteer base, LVE has been supported by many organisations, including UNESCO, governmental bodies, foundations, community groups and individuals. It is part of the global movement for a culture of peace following the United Nations International Decade for a Culture of Peace and Non-Violence for the Children of the World.

While focusing on values within formal school education settings, LVE also supports individuals at home, youth, parents, businesses and communities in understanding, developing and living by values in daily life.

== Activities ==
As well as creating professional development courses ALIVE creates educational resource materials to help educators and others develop widely-shared values, according to their cultural context.

LVE focuses on values such as: Peace, Love, Respect, Tolerance, Responsibility, Humility, Honesty, Cooperation, Happiness, Simplicity, Freedom, Compassion, Care, Unity expressed through attitude, behaviour and relationships. LVE emphasizes the worth and integrity of each person involved in the provision of education, in the home, school and community. In fostering quality education, LVE supports the overall development of the individual and a culture of positive values in each society and throughout the world, believing that education is a fundamental purposeful activity designed to help humanity flourish.

In 2001, the initial series of five LVE books won 'The Teachers' Choice Award' by Learning Magazine, Substantial expansion and updating of the books, including the three age group (3–7), (8–14), (Young Adults) activities books, began in 2019.

In 2019, ALIVE introduced LVE distance facilitator training programmes and held regional gatherings of ALIVE member organisations. It also revamped and expanded its website, offering more downloadable resources, and increased its offering of videos on YouTube.

== Special risk ==
LVE has special programmes for children at risk including refugees and Children Affected by War (LVARCAW), street children, youth in need of drug rehabilitation and young offenders.

The Ministry of Labor in Vietnam noted in March 2008 that LVE’ drug rehabilitation program was the most successful drug rehab program in government rehabilitation clinics in the country.

== Bibliography ==
- Living values, Theoretical Background and Support
- Living Values Activities for Children Ages 3–7 by Diane Tillman and Diana Hsu, 2001. ISBN 1-55874-879-2.
- Living Values Activities for Children Ages 8–14 by Diane Tillman, 2001. ISBN 978-1-55874-880-4.
- Living Values Activities for Young Adults by Diane Tillman, 2001. ISBN 1-55874-881-4.
- Living Values Parent Groups: A Facilitator Guide by Diane Tillman, 2001. ISBN 1-55874-882-2.
- LVEP Educator Training Guide by Diane Tillman and Pilar Quera Colomina. February 2001. ISBN 1-55874-883-0.
- Making the Case for Values and Character Education: A Brief Review of the Literature
- Common values for the common school? Using two values education programmes to promote ‘spiritual and moral development', Arweck, Elisabeth, Nesbitt, Eleanor and Jackson, Robert. Journal of Moral Education, Volume 34, Number 3, Sep 2005, pp. 325–342
- Lovat T., Schofield N., Morrison, K., & O'Neill, O. (2002). Research Dimensions of values education: A Newcastle Perspective. Canberra: Australian College of Education Yearbook.

== Website ==
- Official ALIVE - LVE website
