= Laurens Hill, Georgia =

Unincorporated community in Georgia, U.S.

Coordinates: 32°31′15″N 83°08′46″W

Laurens Hill is an unincorporated community in Laurens County, in the U.S. state of Georgia.

== History ==
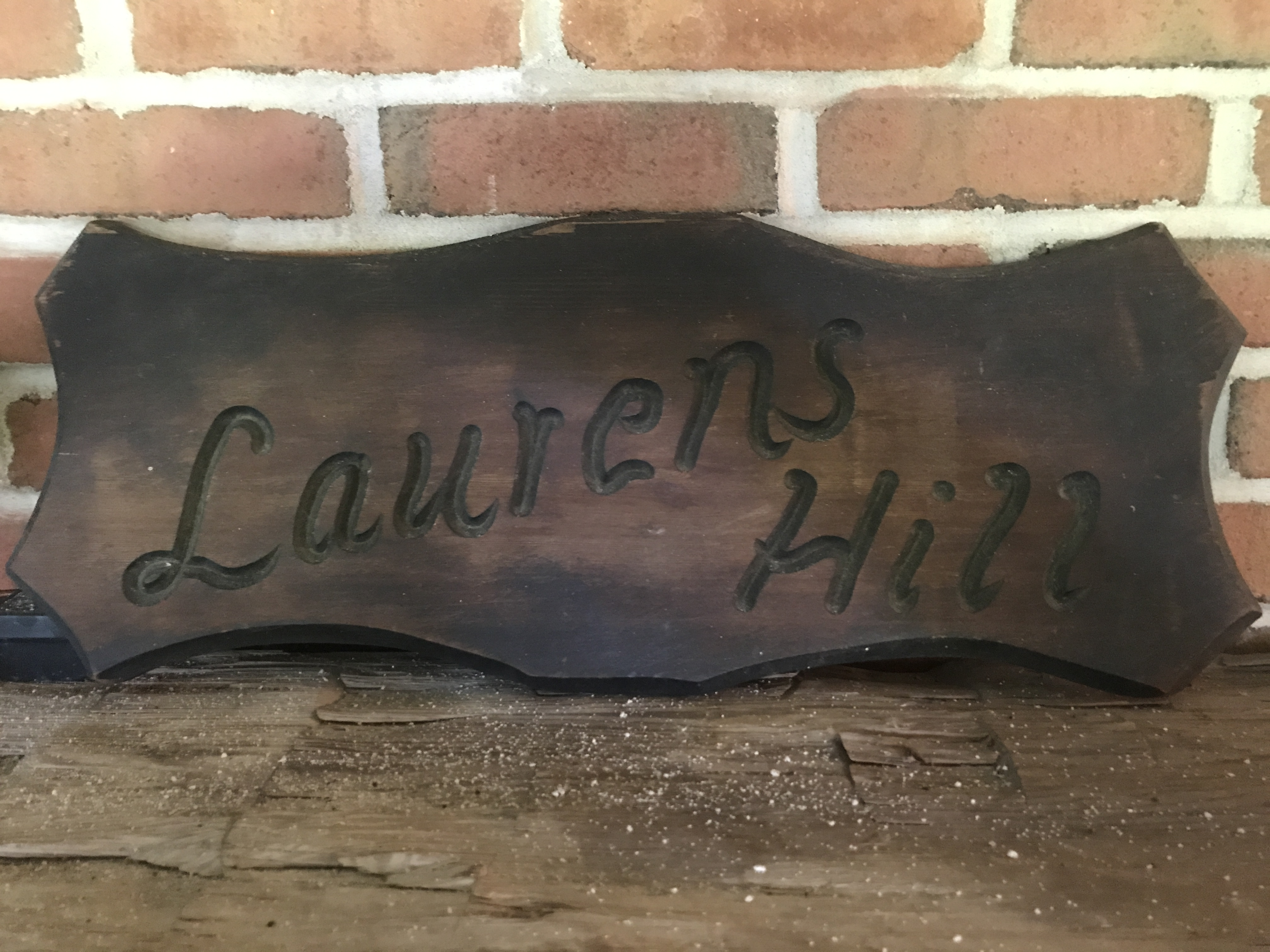
Engraved Plaque

A post office called Laurens Hill was established in 1835 and remained in operation until 1903. The community was named after a nearby plantation estate. The home built by David Harvard in 1835 at the crossroads of Blackshear Ferry Rd (GA Hwy 26 today) and Laurens Hill Church Rd was dubbed Laurens Hill and David was its first Postmaster. Following his death in 1865, his wife Mary (née Fish) and son Quinn also served in that capacity. David co-founded the Laurens Hill Baptist Church which was first built on the banks of Rocky Creek at the intersection of Blackshear Ferry Rd about 1 mile southwest of the main home. Diagonally across the street from the main home is the Harvard Family Cemetery where John and many of his descendants and their spouses are interred. The Laurens Hill Church Cemetery is about 1/2 mile northeast where some of the slaves (who were also descendants of John Harvard) and their descendants are buried. A description of the Laurens Hill estate and its original inhabitants is available in The Official History of Laurens County Georgia, 1807–1941. The community and persons are also described by descendants in the memoir, Spitting Image.
