= Lovett Island =

Coordinates: 35.8056218°N 87.6177966°W

Lovett Island is an island in Hickman County, Tennessee on the Duck River. The island takes it shape from the formation of an oxbow lake.

Lovett Island was named for Jesse Lovett, a pioneer settler.
