= Mary Jarrett White =

Early American woman voter

Mary Jarrett White was the first woman to vote in the state of Georgia, casting a vote after the passage of the Nineteenth Amendment to the United States Constitution but before it was logistically feasible for women to do so in Georgia. White was also the last private owner of one of the first land grants in the state of Georgia, and she was the founding organizing regent of the Daughters of the American Revolution in Toccoa, Georgia.

== Life ==
White was born Mary Jarrett, and was married to Virgil A. White.

White was able to vote before women's suffrage was officially instituted in the state of Georgia through the adoption of the Nineteenth Amendment to the United States Constitution. When the amendment was passed, the state decreed that women could vote in the 1920 election only if they had registered 6 months before the election date, which was a tactic to suppress women's votes, since it would not have been reasonable to expect women to register to vote in an election when they did not yet have the right to vote. For reasons that are not known, Mary Jarrett White was the only woman who did actually register 6 months before the election took place, even though at the time the amendment had not been ratified. This made White the only woman to vote in the 1920 election, and the first woman to vote in the state of Georgia.

White was also the last private owner of what is now the Traveler's Rest Historical Site in Toccoa, Georgia. The land was one of the first land grants in the history of Georgia, when it was given by the government to revolutionary war veteran Major Jesse Walton in 1785. White's grandfather, Devereaux Jarrett, bought the site near Toccoa, which came to be known as Jarrett Manor. White sold the home to the state of Georgia in 1955, when it was officially designated a historical site. The Historic American Buildings Survey commissioned drawings of the Traveler's Rest homestead in 1934, and the National Register of Historic Places named Traveler's Rest a National Historic Landmark in 1963.

White was a founder and the first organizing regent of the Daughters of the American Revolution in Toccoa, and she also served as secretary of the chapter. Several events have been held commemorating her founding of the chapter. In addition to founding the local chapter of the Daughters of the American Revolution, White was an active volunteer with prison reform efforts and the Red Cross.

White was an elector for Georgia in the United States Electoral College in 1932.
