= Brewton, Georgia =

Unincorporated community in Georgia, U.S.

- Unincorporated community
- Interactive map of Brewton, Georgia
- Coordinates: 32°35′38″N 82°47′53″W
- Country: United States
- State: Georgia
- County: Laurens
- Incorporated: 1889
- Charter dissolved: 1995
- Named for: Bruton Creek

Brewton (also spelled Bruton) is an unincorporated community in Laurens County, in the U.S. state of Georgia.

== History ==
Variant names were "Bruton" and "Bruton Station". Brewton had its start in 1884 when the Wrightsville and Tennille Railroad was extended to that point. A post office called Brewton was established in 1894, and remained in operation until 1958. The community took its name from Bruton Creek (also known as Brewton Creek). The Georgia General Assembly incorporated the place as the "Town of Bruton" in 1889. The town's charter was dissolved in 1995.

== See also ==
- Bruton and Pineora Railway
