= Thomas Leavitt House =

Historic house in Nevada, United States

- U.S. National Register of Historic Places
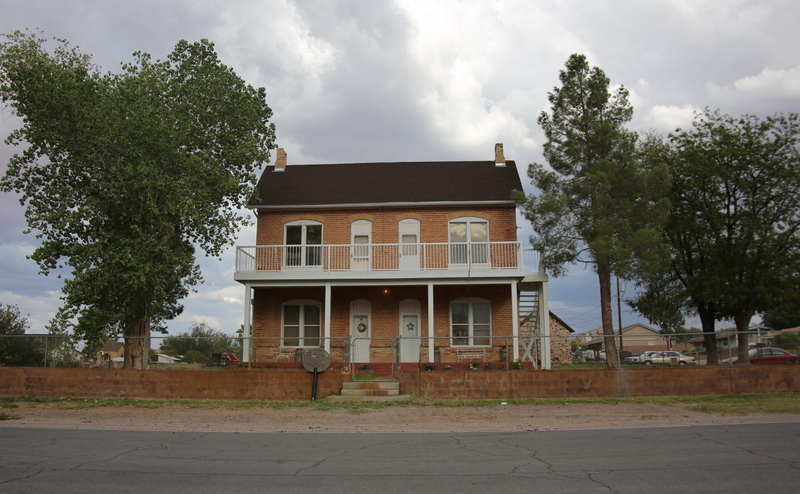

- Location within Nevada Location within the United States
- Location: 160 S. First West St., Bunkerville, Nevada
- Coordinates: 36°46′15″N 114°7′37″W
- Built: 1895
- Architect: Leavitt, Thomas Dudley
- Architectural style: Vernacular I-house
- NRHP reference No.: 91001653
- Added to NRHP: November 14, 1991

Thomas Leavitt House, a brick house built in the nineteenth century in Bunkerville, Nevada, United States, is listed on the National Register of Historic Places.

The Thomas Leavitt House was built by Thomas Dudley Leavitt (1857–1933), who was born in Santa Clara, Utah, the son of Lemuel Sturdevant Leavitt and his wife Laura Melvina (Thompson). Thomas Dudley Leavitt settled in Bunkerville, Nevada, near Mesquite, Nevada. in 1877 with 22 other members of the Church of Jesus Christ of Latter-day Saints.

Leavitt's group harked back to church pioneer Joseph Smith, founding a utopian community based on an economic system based on cooperative labor and communal property ownership, principles that Mormon leader Brigham Young had set aside in favor of the tithing system. But Young permitted the settlement to proceed despite his differences with the utopian ideals of the United Order settlers.

Thomas Leavitt built a two-story brick home in Bunkerville for his first wife Louella (Abbott). Then Leavitt subsequently married a second wife Ada (Waite). The prosperous Leavitt, who had thrived growing grain, raising cattle and selling molasses, built another home for the family. The T-shaped house, two stories high and one room deep, had chimneys at each end. The design was typical of the homes of Mormon settlers dispersing from Salt Lake northward to Idaho and southward towards Nevada. The house featured multiple exterior doors, which in a Mormon polygamist community meant that the house would allow circulation while allowing some interior privacy. The house had no hallways, and was surrounded by large wooden porches on the exterior.

Eventually, the large home couldn't contain the Mormon settler's entire brood. He had gone on to father some 22 children—11 with each wife. So Leavitt built a house next door for his wife Ada. The original brick house today is listed on the National Register of Historic Places. It sits on a large lot surrounded by a picket fence, with honey locust trees, chicken coops and the house's original stone granary out back. The house retains the character of the early Mormon utopian settlement.

Thomas Dudley Leavitt Park in Bunkerville is also named for the early Mormon pioneer.
