= Johnson County, Georgia =

County in Georgia, United States

- County
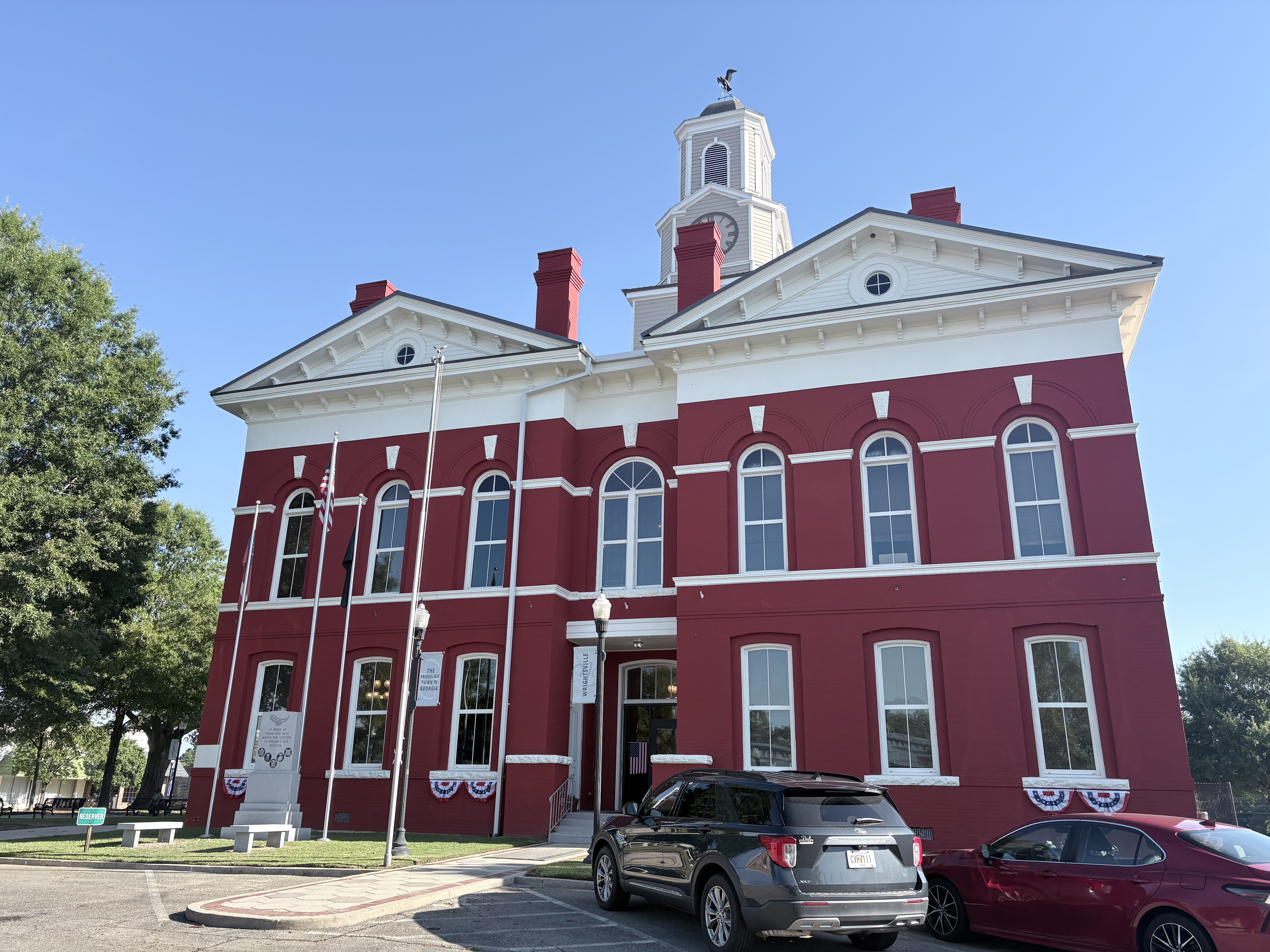
- Johnson County Courthouse in Wrightsville

- Location within the U.S. state of Georgia
- Coordinates: 32°42′N 82°40′W
- Country: United States
- State: Georgia
- Founded: December 11, 1858; 167 years ago
- Named for: Herschel Vespasian Johnson
- Seat: Wrightsville
- Largest city: Wrightsville

Area
  - Total: 307 sq mi (800 km^{2})
  - Land: 303 sq mi (780 km^{2})
  - Water: 3.6 sq mi (9.3 km^{2}) 1.2%

Population (2020)
  - Total: 9,189
  - Estimate (2025): 9,310 ▲
  - Density: 30.3/sq mi (11.7/km^{2})
- Time zone: UTC−5 (Eastern)
  - Summer (DST): UTC−4 (EDT)
- Congressional district: 12th
- Website: www.johnsonco.org

Johnson County is a county located along the Oconee River in the U.S. state of Georgia. As of the 2020 census, the population was 9,189. The county seat is Wrightsville. Johnson County is part of the Dublin, Georgia, micropolitan statistical area.

== History ==
Johnson County was created by the Georgia legislature on December 11, 1858, from parts of Emanuel, Laurens, and Washington counties. Johnson County was named for Georgia governor, senator, and U.S. vice-presidential candidate Herschel Vespasian Johnson.

In 1919, a deputy driving Jim Waters, a black prisoner accused of rape, out of the county was stopped by a group of 150 men at a bridge over the Ohoopee River. The men tied Waters to a tree and shot him numerous times. The case was closed without any investigation.

== Geography ==
According to the U.S. Census Bureau, the county has a total area of 307 square miles (800 km^{2}), of which 303 square miles (780 km^{2}) is land and 3.6 square miles (9.3 km^{2}) (1.2%) is water.

The vast majority of Johnson County is located in the Ohoopee River sub-basin of the Altamaha River basin. Tiny portions of the northeastern borders of the county are located in the Upper Ogeechee River sub-basin of the Ogeechee River basin, while the western corner of Johnson County is located in the Lower Oconee River sub-basin of the Altamaha River basin.

=== Major highways ===
- U.S. Route 80 / State Route 26
- U.S. Route 221 / State Route 171
- U.S. Route 319
- State Route 15
- State Route 31
- State Route 57
- State Route 78
- State Route 86

=== Adjacent counties ===
- Washington County - north
- Jefferson County - northeast
- Emanuel County - east
- Treutlen County - south
- Laurens County - southwest
- Wilkinson County - west

== Communities ==
=== Cities ===
- Adrian (partly in Emanuel County)
- Kite
- Wrightsville (county seat)

=== Unincorporated communities ===
- Meeks
- Donovan
- New Home (Johnson County)
- Tom
- Scott
- Moores Chapel (Johnson County)

== Demographics ==
Historical population
Census	Pop.	Note	%±
1860	2,919		—
1870	2,964		1.5%
1880	4,800		61.9%
1890	6,129		27.7%
1900	11,409		86.1%
1910	12,897		13.0%
1920	13,546		5.0%
1930	12,681		−6.4%
1940	12,953		2.1%
1950	9,893		−23.6%
1960	8,048		−18.6%
1970	7,727		−4.0%
1980	8,660		12.1%
1990	8,329		−3.8%
2000	8,560		2.8%
2010	9,980		16.6%
2020	9,189		−7.9%
2025 (est.)	9,310	▲	1.3%
U.S. Decennial Census; 1790-1880 1890-1910; 1920-1930 1930-1940; 1940-1950 1960-1980; 1980-2000 2010 2020

=== Racial and ethnic composition ===
Johnson County, Georgia – Racial and ethnic composition Note: the US Census treats Hispanic/Latino as an ethnic category. This table excludes Latinos from the racial categories and assigns them to a separate category. Hispanics/Latinos may be of any race.
Race / Ethnicity (NH = Non-Hispanic)	Pop 1980	Pop 1990	Pop 2000	Pop 2010	Pop 2020	% 1980	% 1990	% 2000	% 2010	% 2020
White alone (NH)	5,833	5,457	5,307	6,219	5,800	67.36%	65.52%	62.00%	62.31%	63.12%
Black or African American alone (NH)	2,725	2,825	3,131	3,461	3,017	31.47%	33.92%	36.58%	34.68%	32.83%
Native American or Alaska Native alone (NH)	1	3	11	17	23	0.01%	0.04%	0.13%	0.17%	0.25%
Asian alone (NH)	3	7	10	22	28	0.03%	0.08%	0.12%	0.22%	0.30%
Native Hawaiian or Pacific Islander alone (NH)	x	x	1	3	15	x	x	0.01%	0.03%	0.16%
Other race alone (NH)	2	2	1	7	14	0.02%	0.02%	0.01%	0.07%	0.15%
Mixed race or Multiracial (NH)	x	x	21	65	175	x	x	0.25%	0.65%	1.90%
Hispanic or Latino (any race)	96	35	78	186	117	1.11%	0.42%	0.91%	1.86%	1.27%
Total	8,660	8,329	8,560	9,980	9,189	100.00%	100.00%	100.00%	100.00%	100.00%

=== 2020 census ===
As of the 2020 census, the county had a population of 9,189. The median age was 43.8 years. 18.7% of residents were under the age of 18 and 18.7% of residents were 65 years of age or older. For every 100 females there were 128.7 males, and for every 100 females age 18 and over there were 134.4 males age 18 and over. 0.0% of residents lived in urban areas, while 100.0% lived in rural areas.

There were 3,100 households in the county, 2,208 of which were families; 29.7% had children under the age of 18 living with them and 34.5% had a female householder with no spouse or partner present. About 30.3% of all households were made up of individuals and 14.7% had someone living alone who was 65 years of age or older.

There were 3,542 housing units, of which 12.5% were vacant. Among occupied housing units, 73.1% were owner-occupied and 26.9% were renter-occupied. The homeowner vacancy rate was 1.1% and the rental vacancy rate was 6.4%.

The racial makeup of the county was 63.4% White, 33.0% Black or African American, 0.3% American Indian and Alaska Native, 0.3% Asian, 0.2% Native Hawaiian and Pacific Islander, 0.5% from some other race, and 2.4% from two or more races. Hispanic or Latino residents of any race comprised 1.3% of the population.

== Government ==
The county is governed by a five-member board of commissioners. A county manager handles the daily operation of the county.

The county is part of the Dublin Judicial Circuit along with Twiggs County, Treutlen County, and Laurens County.

Board of commissioners
District	Commissioner	Party
District 1	Felice Pullen	Democratic
District 2	James McAfee Jr. [CHAIR]	Republican
District 3	Jerronney Darrisaw	Democratic
District 4	Brian Lindsey	Republican
District 5	Mike Keene	Republican

== Politics ==
United States presidential election results for Johnson County, Georgia
Year	Republican		Democratic		Third party(ies)	
Year	No.	%	No.	%	No.	%
1912	92	23.00%	285	71.25%	23	5.75%
1916	150	16.95%	715	80.79%	20	2.26%
1920	74	19.47%	306	80.53%	0	0.00%
1924	194	14.18%	1,058	77.34%	116	8.48%
1928	284	31.00%	632	69.00%	0	0.00%
1932	18	1.34%	1,314	98.06%	8	0.60%
1936	334	15.15%	1,861	84.40%	10	0.45%
1940	306	11.32%	2,386	88.24%	12	0.44%
1944	304	23.71%	978	76.29%	0	0.00%
1948	67	5.33%	685	54.54%	504	40.13%
1952	344	15.99%	1,808	84.01%	0	0.00%
1956	179	10.02%	1,607	89.98%	0	0.00%
1960	488	27.32%	1,298	72.68%	0	0.00%
1964	1,940	73.99%	682	26.01%	0	0.00%
1968	381	13.28%	446	15.55%	2,041	71.16%
1972	2,201	84.07%	417	15.93%	0	0.00%
1976	698	24.00%	2,210	76.00%	0	0.00%
1980	1,123	37.07%	1,854	61.21%	52	1.72%
1984	1,733	59.11%	1,199	40.89%	0	0.00%
1988	1,567	62.83%	927	37.17%	0	0.00%
1992	1,314	39.88%	1,473	44.70%	508	15.42%
1996	815	36.14%	1,194	52.95%	246	10.91%
2000	1,797	62.33%	1,065	36.94%	21	0.73%
2004	2,279	64.11%	1,263	35.53%	13	0.37%
2008	2,426	66.47%	1,198	32.82%	26	0.71%
2012	2,440	64.62%	1,305	34.56%	31	0.82%
2016	2,519	68.34%	1,136	30.82%	31	0.84%
2020	2,850	69.51%	1,222	29.80%	28	0.68%
2024	2,913	73.12%	1,066	26.76%	5	0.13%

United States Senate election results for Johnson County, Georgia2
Year	Republican		Democratic		Third party(ies)	
Year	No.	%	No.	%	No.	%
2020	2,801	69.43%	1,158	28.71%	75	1.86%
2020	2,529	70.78%	1,044	29.22%	0	0.00%

United States Senate election results for Johnson County, Georgia3
Year	Republican		Democratic		Third party(ies)	
Year	No.	%	No.	%	No.	%
2020	1,376	34.71%	763	19.25%	1,825	46.04%
2020	2,529	70.72%	1,047	29.28%	0	0.00%
2022	2,484	73.71%	869	25.79%	17	0.50%
2022	2,419	71.44%	967	28.56%	0	0.00%

Georgia Gubernatorial election results for Johnson County
Year	Republican		Democratic		Third party(ies)	
Year	No.	%	No.	%	No.	%
2022	2,504	74.02%	867	25.63%	12	0.35%

As of the 2020s, Johnson County is a Republican stronghold, voting 73% for Donald Trump in 2024. For elections to the United States House of Representatives, Johnson County is part of Georgia's 12th congressional district, currently represented by Rick Allen. For elections to the Georgia State Senate, Johnson County is part of District 26. For elections to the Georgia House of Representatives, Johnson County is part of District 155.

== Education ==
In 1970, Johnson County schools integrated peacefully due to careful planning by the county's board of education and firm management by superintendent Buren Claxton.

The county's public schools are located in Wrightsville. The school mascot is the Trojan, and the school colors are blue and white. The school fight song is the theme from the movie Hang 'Em High.

== Sports ==
Herschel Walker, a Johnson County native, played on the county's only state championship football team in 1979. Walker went on to play for the University of Georgia and won the Heisman Trophy. In 2004 Johnson County High School named its football field for Walker.

== See also ==
- National Register of Historic Places listings in Johnson County, Georgia
- List of counties in Georgia
