= Terry Lovat =

Australian academic

Terence John "Terry" Lovat is an Australian academic and author, best known for his research on values education, Islamic education, curriculum and doctoral education. He is Emeritus Professor at the University of Newcastle (Australia), Distinguished Visiting professor at the University of Johannesburg (South Africa), and Honorary Research Fellow at the University of Oxford (UK), where he remains active as a doctoral supervisor. In 2024, GPS Scholar ranked him in the top 0.05% of scholars worldwide. As of 2026, he has over 7000 citations and an h-index of 43.

== Early life and education ==
Lovat completed a Bachelor of Theology (1973) and a Master of Theology (1979) before undertaking further study. He earned a Master of Arts (Hons) (1982), Bachelor of Education (1983) and a Doctor of Philosophy (1987) from the University of Sydney. He was in religious ministry, including work in the South Pacific, and high school teaching before starting an academic career.

== Academic career ==
Lovat served at the University of Newcastle in multiple roles, including Lecturer (1985–1989), Senior Lecturer (1989–1993), Associate Professor (1994–1995), Professor of Education (1995–2011), Dean of Education (1996–2001), and Pro Vice-Chancellor (Education and Arts) (2001–2011). Between 2001 and 2011, he was a member of the University Executive Committee, occasionally serving as Acting Deputy and Vice-Chancellor. He was appointed Emeritus Professor upon retirement in 2011.

Nationally, Lovat served as: President of the Australian Council of Deans of Education; Executive Member of the Australian Council of Deans of Arts, Humanities and Social Science; board member of the Carrick Institute for Learning and Teaching in Higher Education; Ministerial Appointee to the National Inquiry into the Teaching of Literacy [2004-2005] and the National Review of Teaching and Teacher Education [2003], as well as regular duties as Australian Research Council Expert & Assessor.

== Research and work ==
Lovat's early research focused on curriculum theory and practice, culminating in a book (with David Smith) that became a prescribed text in many teacher education programs in Australia and overseas, including through translated work. In 2003, he was invited to lead the research projects of the Australian Values Education Program (2003–2010), leading to multiple academic books and other publications.

His early interest in religious education led to specializing in Islamic philosophy and education and producing many publications, including editing a Handbook of Islamic Philosophy. Other work has focused on doctoral education with special emphasis on doctoral examination, and the theology of Dietrich Bonhoeffer.

Lovat was co-editor-in-chief of Teaching and Teacher Education (Elsevier) (2019–2021) and editor-in-chief of The Bonhoeffer Legacy (ATF Press) (2013–2020).

== Honours and service ==
Lovat has received awards for his contribution to intercultural understanding, including an Affinity Intercultural Foundation award (2005) for work promoting understanding of Islam. He was also awarded the University of Newcastle Postgraduate Students Association's Supervisor of the Year in 2017.

He has successfully supervised more than 50 doctoral theses in Australia and overseas and examined more than 80 theses from across the world. He has been cited in parliamentary proceedings for his contribution to higher education.

== Selected publications ==
- Handbook of Islamic Philosophy (Ed.). Springer Nature, in press.
- The Art and Heart of Good Teaching: Values as the Pedagogy. Springer Nature, 2019.
- Lovat, T.; Toomey, R.; Clement, N.; Dally, K. (Eds.), International Research Handbook on Values Education and Student Wellbeing. Springer, 2010/2023.
- Lovat, T.; Crotty, R. Reconciling Islam, Christianity and Judaism: Islam’s Special Role in Restoring Convivencia. Springer, 2015.
- Lovat, T. What Is This Thing Called Religious Education? (3rd ed.). David Barlow Publishing, 2009.
- Lovat, T.; Smith, D. Curriculum: Action on Reflection (4th ed.). Thomson, 2003.
