= Cohutta Wilderness =

Protected area in Georgia, United States

- IUCN category Ib (wilderness area)
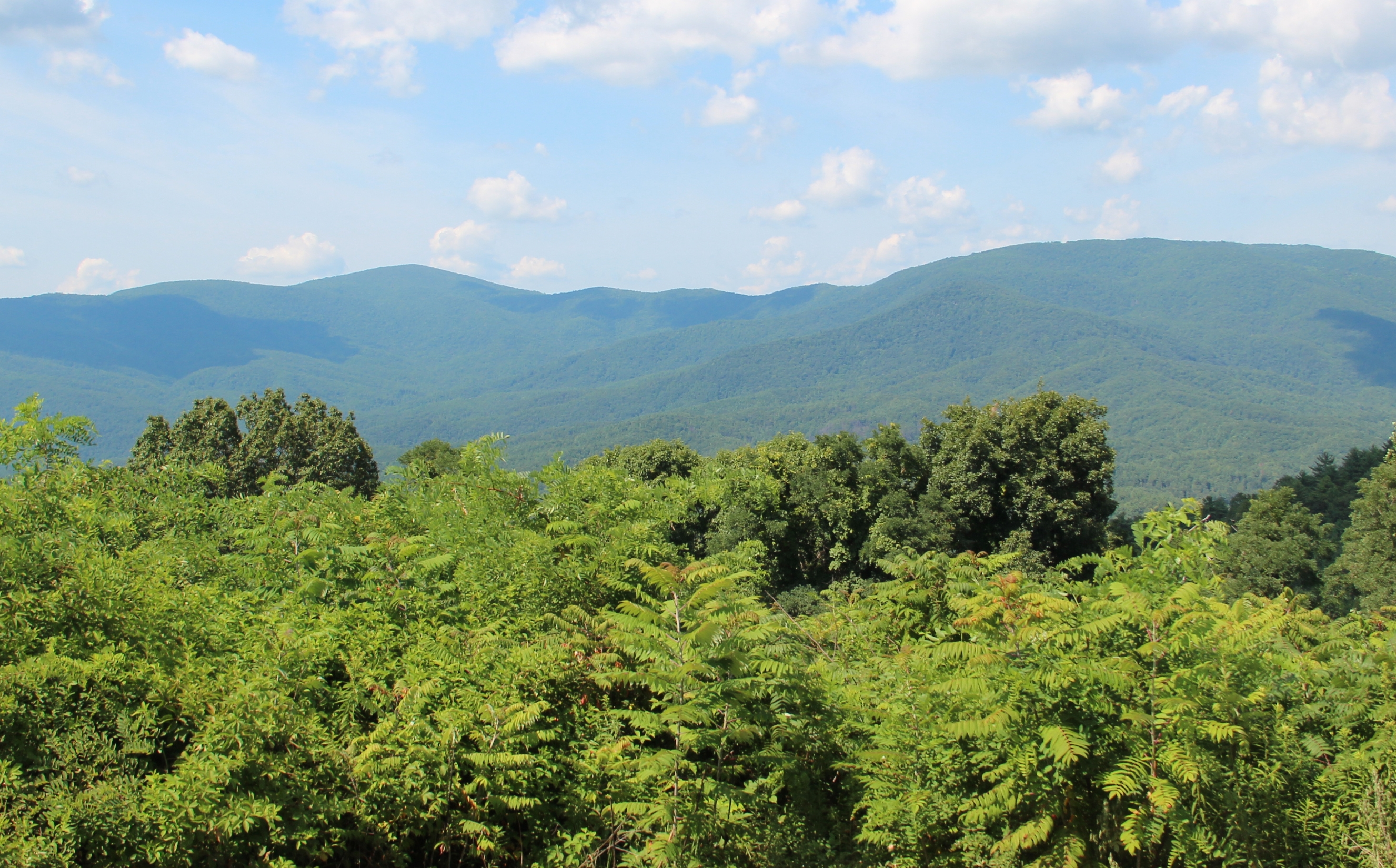

- Location within Georgia
- Location: Fannin / Murray / Gilmer counties, Georgia / Polk County, Tennessee, USA
- Nearest city: Crandall, Georgia
- Coordinates: 34°52′32″N 84°37′32″W
- Area: 36,977 acres (150 km^{2})
- Established: 1975
- Visitors: 60,000
- Governing body: U.S. Forest Service

The Cohutta Wilderness was designated in 1975, expanded in 1986, and currently consists of 36,977 acres (149.64 km^{2}). Approximately 35,268 acres (142.72 km^{2}) are located in Georgia in the Chattahoochee National Forest and approximately 1,709 acres (6.92 km^{2}) are located in Tennessee in the Cherokee National Forest. Combined with the surrounding 96,583-acre Cohutta Wildlife Management Area and the bordering 8,082 acre Big Frog Wilderness, the region spans over 100,000 acres, making it one of the largest contiguous protected areas in the Eastern United States and the largest federally designated wilderness on the East Coast. The Wilderness is managed by the Conasauga Ranger District of the United States Forest Service and is part of the National Wilderness Preservation System.

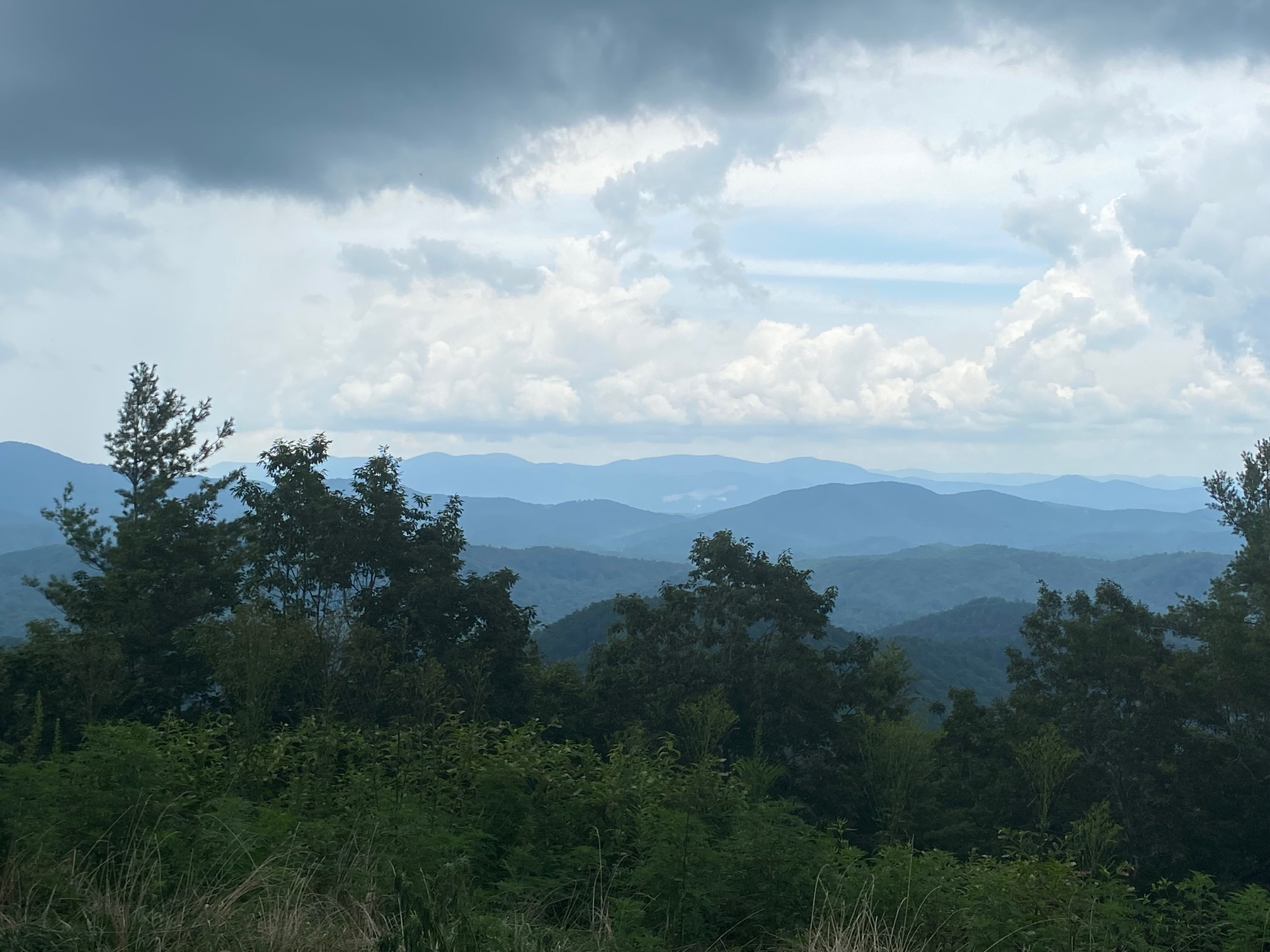
View from Conasauga Road via Bear Creek Overlook

== Geography and elevation ==
The Cohutta Wilderness is entirely within the broader metasedimentary Cohutta Mountains which are part of the broader Blue Ridge Mountains ecoregion. The Cohutta Mountains are part of the Unaka Range which includes the Ocoee, Unicoi Mountains, and Great Smoky Mountains. They are the southern terminus of this mountain chain. This range is geologically distinct from the Northeast Georgia mountains east of the geological Murphy Syncline split. The Cohuttas of Fannin, Murray and Gilmer counties are not part of the Blue Ridge, either physiographically or geologically. They are composed of early cambrian rocks: slates, quartzites and conglomerates of the Ocoee series and quite different from the biotite schists and gneisses of the more highly metamorphosed sedimentary rocks from which the main core of the Blue Ridge is constructed with.

The Cohutta Mountains form one of the most prominent high-elevation blocks on the western edge of the Georgia Blue Ridge. Rising sharply above the lower Ridge and Valley province to the west, the range creates an elevated habitat complex with a marked contrast between the surrounding valleys and the cooler, wetter uplands. This elevation gradient gives the Cohuttas a sky island-like character, in which higher-elevation forests, headwater streams, and montane plant communities are separated from adjacent lowland environments by steep relief. The Environmental Protection Agency describes the Ridge and Valley region west of the Blue Ridge as a relatively low-lying province of parallel ridges and valleys, while the Blue Ridge contains Georgia's highest and wettest mountains.

Cohutta Wilderness, USFS Map & Pamphlet

The highest point in the range within Georgia is Cowpen Mountain standing at 4,150 feet (1,265 m). The highest point within the range lies just over the state line in Tennessee on Big Frog Mountain 4,224 feet (1287 m). The Cohuttas are notable for their dramatic elevation gradient, rising sharply from the Great Valley (Appalachian Valley). The wilderness features the first peaks exceeding 4,000 feet if traveling from the west and the most westerly 4,000 footers on the East coast until you reach the Black Hills of South Dakota. Grassy Mountain, another prominent peak at 3,690 feet (1,125 m), demonstrates the striking rise of nearly 3,000 feet in just under four miles. Just a few miles later, the elevation gradient of nearby Bald Mountain rises over 3,000 feet from its base at the valley floor to its peak at 4,009 feet (1,222 m). These features contribute to the wilderness's lofty topography. For comparison Brasstown Bald, the highest mountain in Georgia has a prominence of 2,108 ft (643 m) from its base.

The same ridge hosts Lake Conasauga, the highest lake in Georgia at an elevation of 3,150 feet (960 m). This Appalachian alpine lake is surrounded by an old-growth forest of white pine, hemlock, yellow birch, sweet birch, red oak, white oak, yellow poplar, and hickory with an understory and herbaceous layer of rhododendron, witch-hazel, mountain laurel, galax, mountain holly, partridge berry and several species of ferns.

== Hydrology, ecology, and climate ==
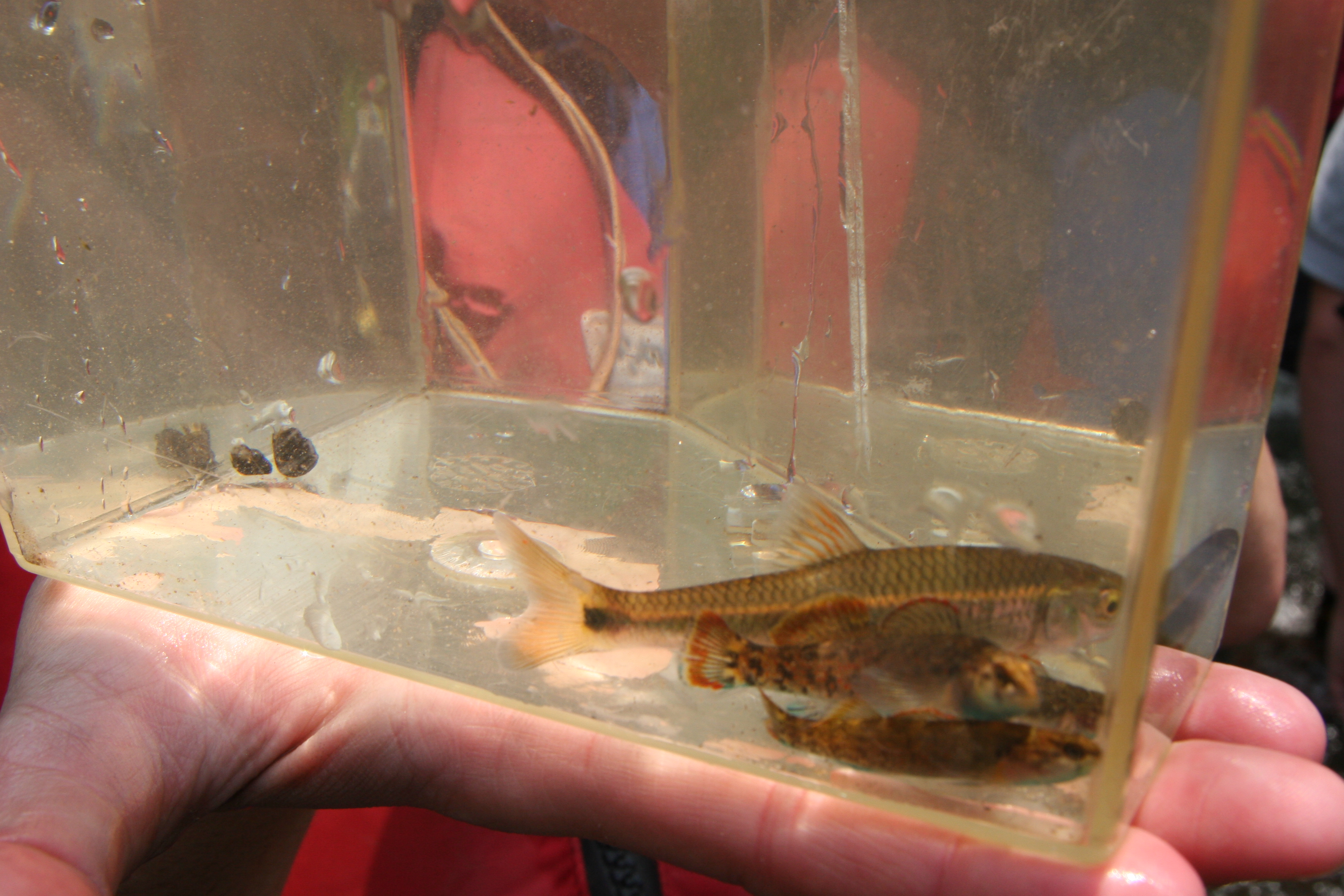
Various Species of Fish in the Conasauga River

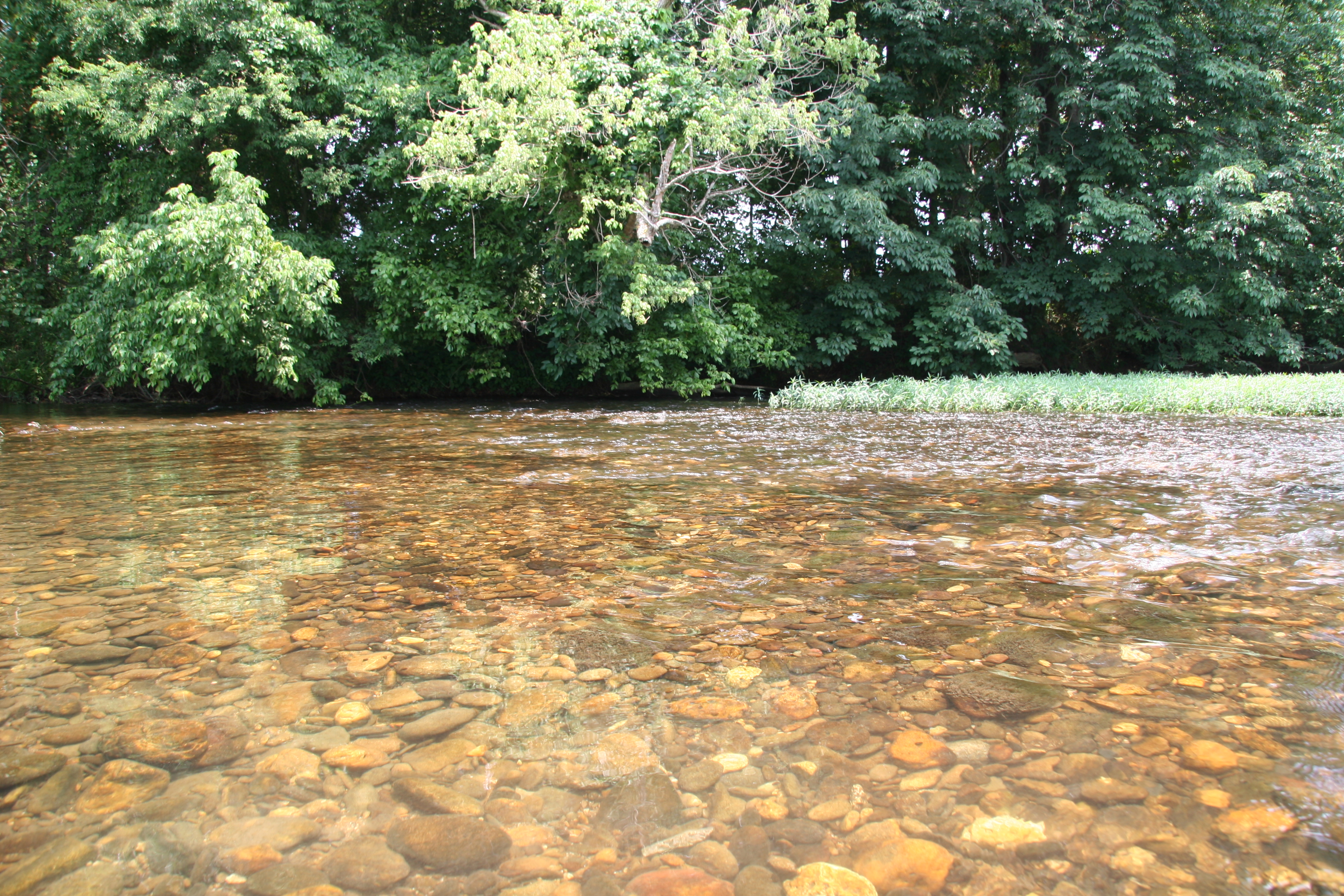
The clear waters of the Conasauga River

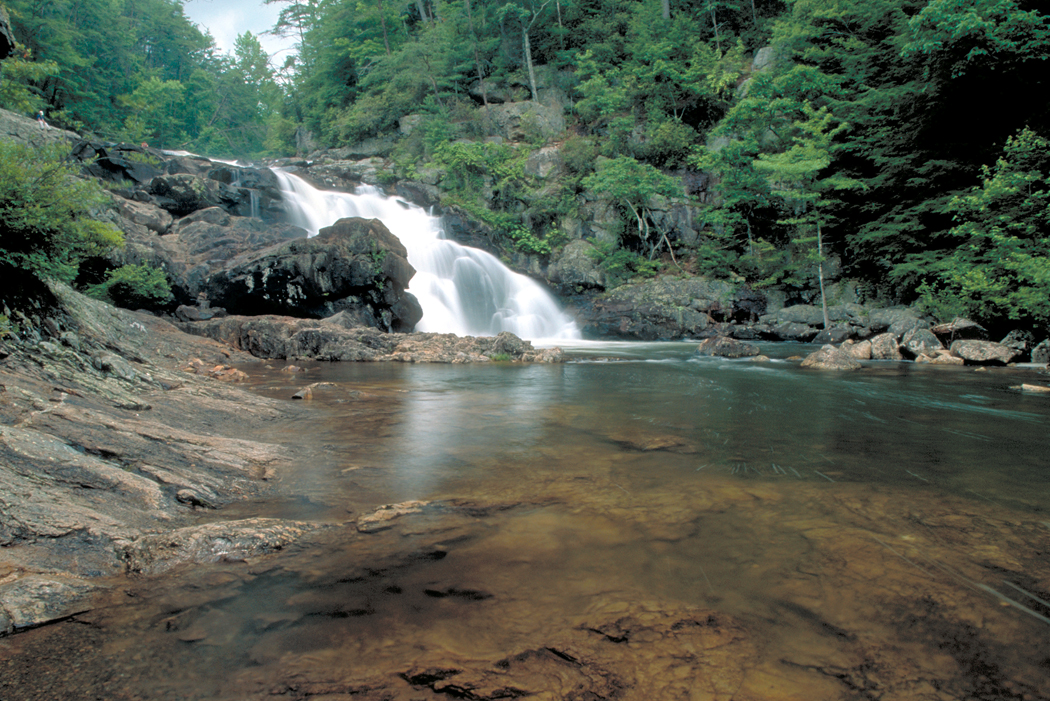
Jacks River Falls

The Cohutta Wilderness and the range is home to two major rivers, the Conasauga River and the Jacks River, along with the headwaters of dozens of tributaries that flow through the rugged landscape such as Bear Creek, Mill Creek, Tumbling Creek, Rough Creek, Emery Creek, Holly Creek, Fightingtown Creek, and Mountaintown Creek. The Conasauga River, one of the most biodiverse rivers in North America, supports more aquatic species than the Columbia and Colorado River watersheds combined, making it an ecological treasure. The river is home to over 90 species of fish such as endangered darters, shiners, and 25 surviving species of freshwater mussels. The upper portion of the Conasauga River that is located within the Cohutta Mountains is also one of the cleanest and clearest rivers of its size in the Southern Appalachians from a sedimentation standpoint. The headwaters of the Conasauga River originate within the Cohutta Wilderness at an elevation of approximately 3,600 feet (1,100 m), where the river begins as a cold spring and flows northward into Tennessee. The Jacks River features numerous waterfalls, Class V whitewater, and deep blue swimming holes, including the renowned Jacks River Falls. Both of these rivers compromise two of the state's most prolific wild trout streams, which meander through rocky gorges, cascades, bluffs, and often flash flood the wilderness during periods of heavy rain. Three species of trout were stocked prior to wilderness designation including non-native rainbow trout, brown trout, and the endemic native Southern Appalachian brook trout and coosa bass.

The wilderness is also home to many mammal species such as white-tailed deer, black bear, bobcat, red fox, coyote, raccoon, opossum, skunk, red squirrel, gray squirrel, chipmunk, beaver, river otter, bats, and wild boar. The uplands and coves provide habitat for turkey, ruffled grouse, and eastern whip-poor-will.

Due to the wilderness's geographical location on the Appalachian flyway, more than 100 bird species have been identified in the area such as hawk, owl, herons, blackbirds, ducks, eagles, sparrows, hummingbirds, juncos, mourning doves, chimney swifts, eastern phoebes, barn swallows, blue jays, indigo buntings, cardinals, towhees, sparrows, chickadees, thrushes, warblers, and geese.

Reptile species such as the eastern copperhead, timber rattlesnakes, watersnakes, box turtles and Amphibians such as frogs, toads, newts and salamanders are also common. Being situated in the Southern Appalachians, a global hotspot for salamander diversity, the wilderness is home to 14 known salamander species. The Tumbling and Fightingtown creek watersheds in the eastern edge of the Cohutta range are also home to the Appalachian endemic eastern hellbender.

However, many large species once lived in the area but were extirpated by land-use and hunting changes brought about by European colonization. These include bison, elk, cougar, Eastern wolf, red wolf, fisher, peregrine falcon, and several species of fish.

Spring and summer bring a riot of colorful blooms to many shrubs, vines, and herbaceous plants, ranging from the brilliant orange of flame azalea, the pink blooming mountain azalea and gorge rhododendron, to the pink lady's-slipper, yellow lady's-slipper, the blue cohosh, and the scarlet cardinal flower. The hillsides of the cove forests become carpeted with trillium flowers around early May. Grassy Mountain is also home to nine species of Trillium, the most known from any single mountain on Earth making Grassy Mountain notable as a center of trillium diversity within the United States. The creek valleys bloom with rhododendron maximum from late June to early July. Northern species that reach unusually low elevations in the Cohuttas include yellow birch, rhododendron catawba, and mountain maple, and southern species rarely found in the mountains include swamp chestnut oak and oakleaf hydrangea.

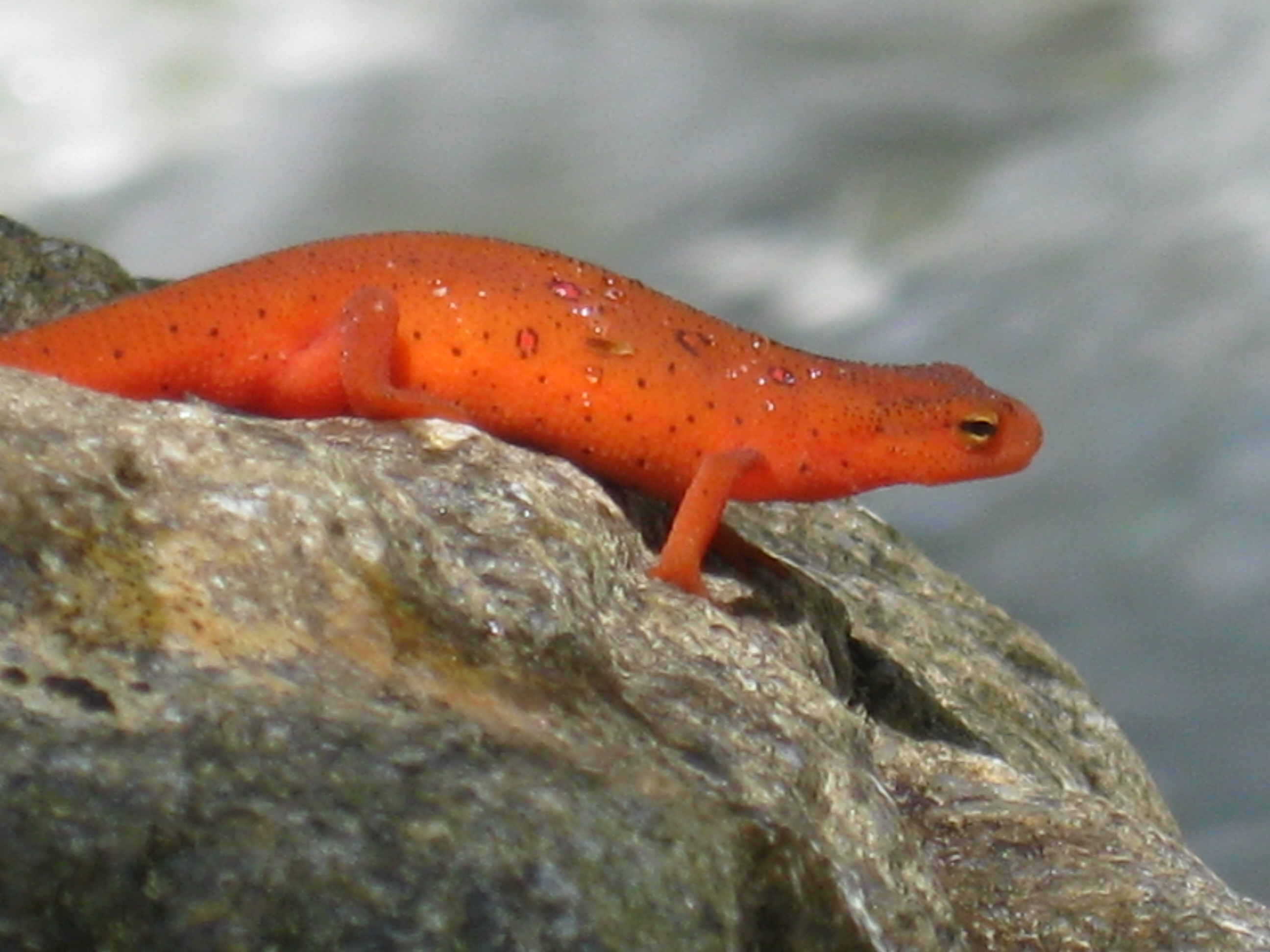
Eft form of the Eastern newt (Notophthalmus viridescens) in the Cohutta Wilderness.

The dendritic hydrology of the range supports diverse ecosystems ranging from lush river valleys at lower elevations under 1,000 feet (300 m) above sea level to white pine, sycamore, yellow buckeye, mountain silverbell, yellow birch, sugar maple, beech, stunted white and red oak, and pockets of naturalized Southern Appalachian spruce–fir forests at higher altitudes such as on Potato Patch Mountain 3,573 feet (1,089 m), and Bald Mountain 4,009 feet (1,222 m). This represents one of the best opportunities in Georgia for species to migrate upslope in response to warming temperatures. High elevation boulder field forests are also present on the northern slopes and coves of the highest peaks within the Cohuttas comprising a variety of lichen covered basswood, maple, oak, and yellow birch trees with a rich herbaceous layer and moss covering the boulders.

Hemlocks (Tsuga canadensis) next to a group shelter on Lake Conasauga.

The largest known tract of old-growth in north Georgia spreads across Grassy Mountain’s rocky upper slopes. The tract includes not only dry, non-commercial oak forests typical of north Georgia’s remaining old-growth, but also cove forests with towering trees. Both tuliptree and northern red oak reach 4.5 feet in diameter on the slopes of Grassy Mountain. Within the range the second largest living tree in Georgia can be viewed and accessed via Bear Creek trail. This old-growth yellow poplar specimen known as the "Gennett Poplar", was named after Andrew Gennett, the founder of the Gennett Lumber Company who famously sold large tracts of land to the United States government, primarily in the North Georgia mountains, which became part of the Chattahoochee National Forest as part of the Weeks Act of 1911.

The Cohutta Mountains, particularly the eastern slopes and the Potato Patch–Grassy–Bald escarpment in the southwestern portion of the range, form one of Georgia's notable high-rainfall mountain areas. Like the better-known Highlands–Cashiers region of the Blue Ridge Escarpment in southwestern North Carolina, where the Highlands Plateau receives about 80–100 inches (2,000–2,500 mm) of annual precipitation, the Cohuttas receive enhanced rainfall through orographic lift as moist air is forced upward over abrupt mountain relief. Although smaller and less continuous than the more Eastern Blue Ridge Escarpment, the Cohutta escarpment occupies a similar ecological role on the western edge of the Blue Ridge, rising above the lower Ridge and Valley province and creating a cool, wet upland habitat island. The eastern Cohuttas receive more than 80 inches of rain annually, producing temperate rainforest-like conditions in north-facing coves and sheltered headwater basins. This precipitation fosters some of the southernmost Appalachian temperate rainforests which are characterized by a thick, dense, and lush herbaceous layer of plants Additionally, these wet coves support rich Southern Appalachian plant communities with dense herbaceous layers, mossy boulderfields, rhododendron and hemlock thickets, and mesic hardwood forests. In this respect, the Cohuttas represent a smaller western counterpart to the Highlands Escarpment, a rugged orographic rain trap where elevation, slope aspect, and abundant precipitation combine to preserve some of the southernmost rainforest-like habitats in the Appalachian Mountains.

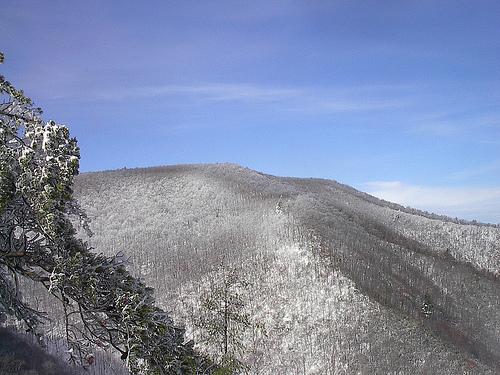
Big Frog Mountain during the winter.

Only the highest elevations in the Cohuttas and high elevation valleys such as Boatwright Valley and Jacks River Fields Campground, the latter which lies at 2,700 feet (820 m) fall with the Appalachian influenced subtropical highland (Köppen climate classification Cfb) climate, a variety grouped within Oceanic climates known for their milder summer climate. These valleys act as cold sinks or frost hollows due to their unique topography which allows cold air to settle and pool on the valley floor, resulting in significantly colder temperatures compared to surrounding areas, essentially making it a "cold sink" or "frost hollow" where cold air gets trapped. The lower elevations fall within the typical humid subtropical climate (Köppen climate classification Cfa).

The Cohutta mountains, particularly the northern facing coves can average between 4 and 18 inches annually due to the upslope flow phenomenon. Surrounding counties typically average 1 to 4 inches of snow annually on average. Elevations over 3,800 feet can have particularly brutal winters with some storms blanketing the mountains with over a foot of snow such as on Big Frog Mountain 4,224 feet (1287 m) which lacks the protection of other mountains, it receives the full impact of cold fronts and other climatic events. During the March 1993 Storm of the Century, the north Georgia mountains received between 12 and 30 inches (30–76 cm) of snow, while NOAA county snowfall data identify Murray County as holding Georgia's single-day snowfall record, with 20 inches (51 cm) recorded on March 14, 1993.

== Human impact and conservation ==
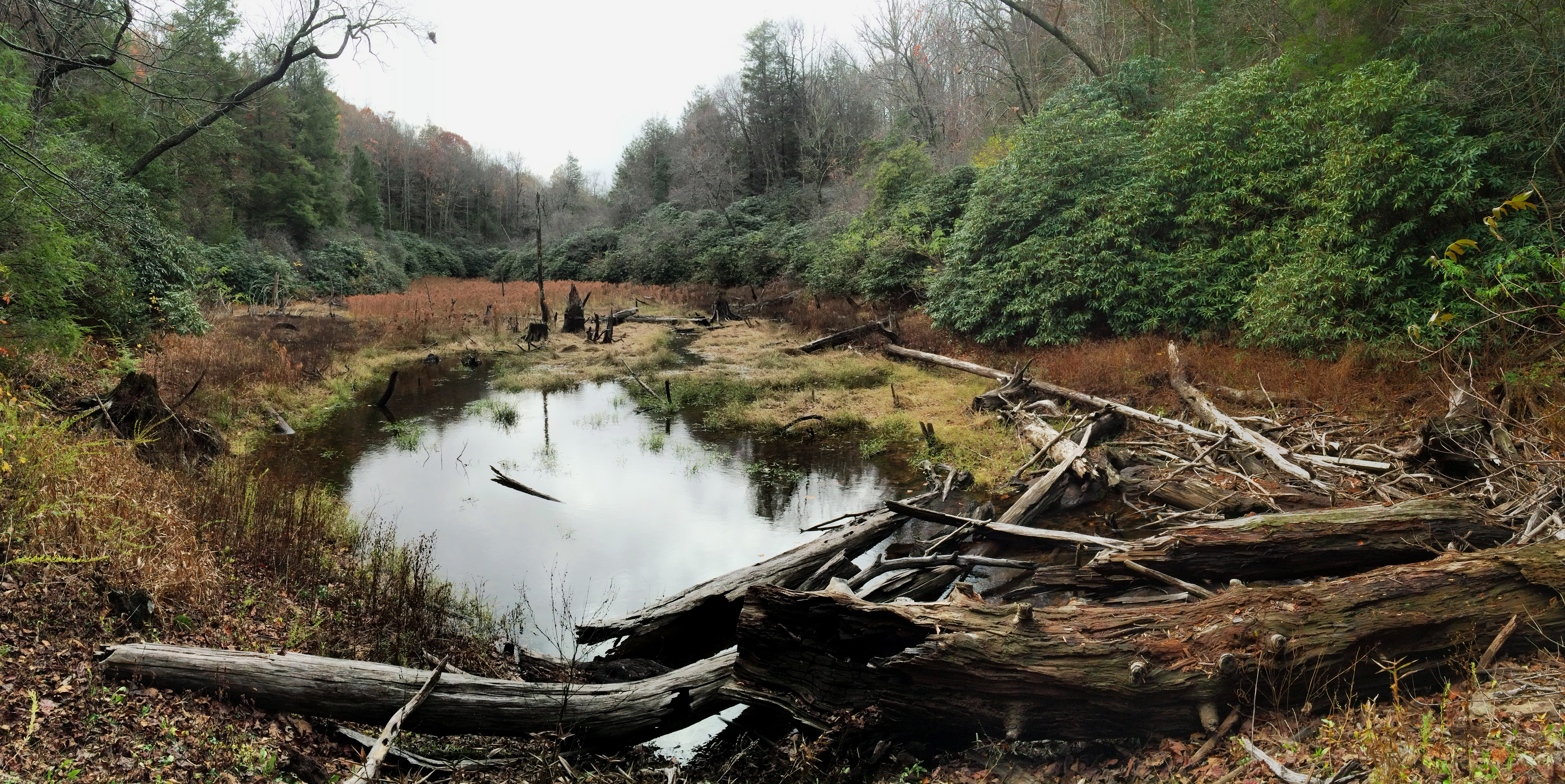
Beaver pond and bog on Lake Conasauga Songbird Trail

In the early 1900s, much of the Cohutta Wilderness was logged by the Conasauga Lumber Company. Extensive clearcutting and timber harvesting, particularly of the region's old-growth American chestnut, poplar, hemlock, and pine forests, continued until the 1930s when the Great Depression brought operations to a halt. This period of overexploitation dramatically altered the landscape, but the subsequent designation as a wilderness area allowed the forest to recover, creating the lush and rugged second growth terrain in much of the wilderness seen today. One can still find evidence of logging roads, equipment, and stonework within the interior trails of the wilderness.

Historically, the area's grassy balds, such as those on Grassy Mountain and Bald Mountain, were used as pasture lands by local farmers from local communities like Cisco, Georgia. Livestock grazing maintained these open fields until the land was acquired by the Forest Service in the early 20th century. Although there are no naturally formed Appalachian balds in the Cohuttas, man-made openings remained until as recently as the 1950s. Today, much of the forest has reclaimed these summits, though similar grassy balds in regions like the Great Smoky Mountains and Roan Highlands are actively maintained by federal agencies.

Due to its popularity, with more than 60,000 visitors annually, the Forest Service has implemented regulations to mitigate overuse, including group size limits and restrictions on campfires. These measures aim to preserve the wilderness character and protect the area for future generations.

== Historical and cultural significance ==
The Cohutta Mountains have cultural significance as part of the historic Cherokee landscape of north Georgia. The name "Cohutta" is generally traced to the Cherokee term Gahuti, commonly interpreted as "a shed roof supported on poles", a reference to the appearance of Cohutta Mountain. The surrounding region was affected by the forced removal of the Cherokee from Georgia in the 1830s, including military activity and removal operations centered elsewhere in north Georgia, such as New Echota and Ellijay. Local tradition also identifies a flat grassy area on Little Bald Mountain as a Cherokee ballfield, possibly associated with Anetsa, the Cherokee form of stickball sometimes called the "little brother of war". In the early twentieth century, the Cohuttas were heavily logged; about 70 percent of the present wilderness area was logged between 1915 and 1930, with logging railroads extending into the Jacks and Conasauga river drainages. The area later became part of the modern conservation history of the Chattahoochee National Forest when Congress designated the Cohutta Wilderness in 1975 under the Eastern Wilderness Areas Act, with an expansion following under the Georgia Wilderness Act of 1986.

The Cohutta Mountains also preserve traces of nineteenth- and early twentieth-century settlement, mining, and logging history. Fort Mountain, at the southwestern end of the range, is best known for its prehistoric stone wall, but the surrounding mountain also attracted mineral prospecting. The National Register of Historic Places nomination for Fort Mountain notes that a talc mine was located on the lower west side of the mountain, and that around 1901 several gold-bearing veins were located at the Cohutta Mine, where shafts, open cuts, and a stamp mill were developed before operations were suspended. The same nomination also records that an 1889 county map showed gold deposits around Fort Mountain and identified the Legal Tender Gold Mine on the mountain's slope.

Settlement-era communities also existed in and around the Cohutta foothills. Local histories identify the Boatwright settlement in the McDonald District near the Murray and Gilmer County line, on the upper reaches of Holly Creek, with grist mills and farms associated with the small mountain community. Farther north, Alaculsy Valley, near the Georgia–Tennessee line, was a developed mountain community from the late nineteenth century into the 1930s. According to Recreation.gov, the valley once contained homes, farms, a church, a post office, a grist mill, a school, cemeteries, and possibly an iron-smelting furnace. The area later became a hub of logging activity in the Cohutta Mountains, with railroad grades following the Conasauga and Jacks Rivers into the mountains; sections of the present-day Conasauga and Jacks River trails follow old railroad beds. Across the state line in Polk County, Tennessee, the broader Cohutta borderlands also included the Old Dutch Settlement, a nineteenth-century community referenced in regional histories and travel accounts.

== Rough Ridge fire ==
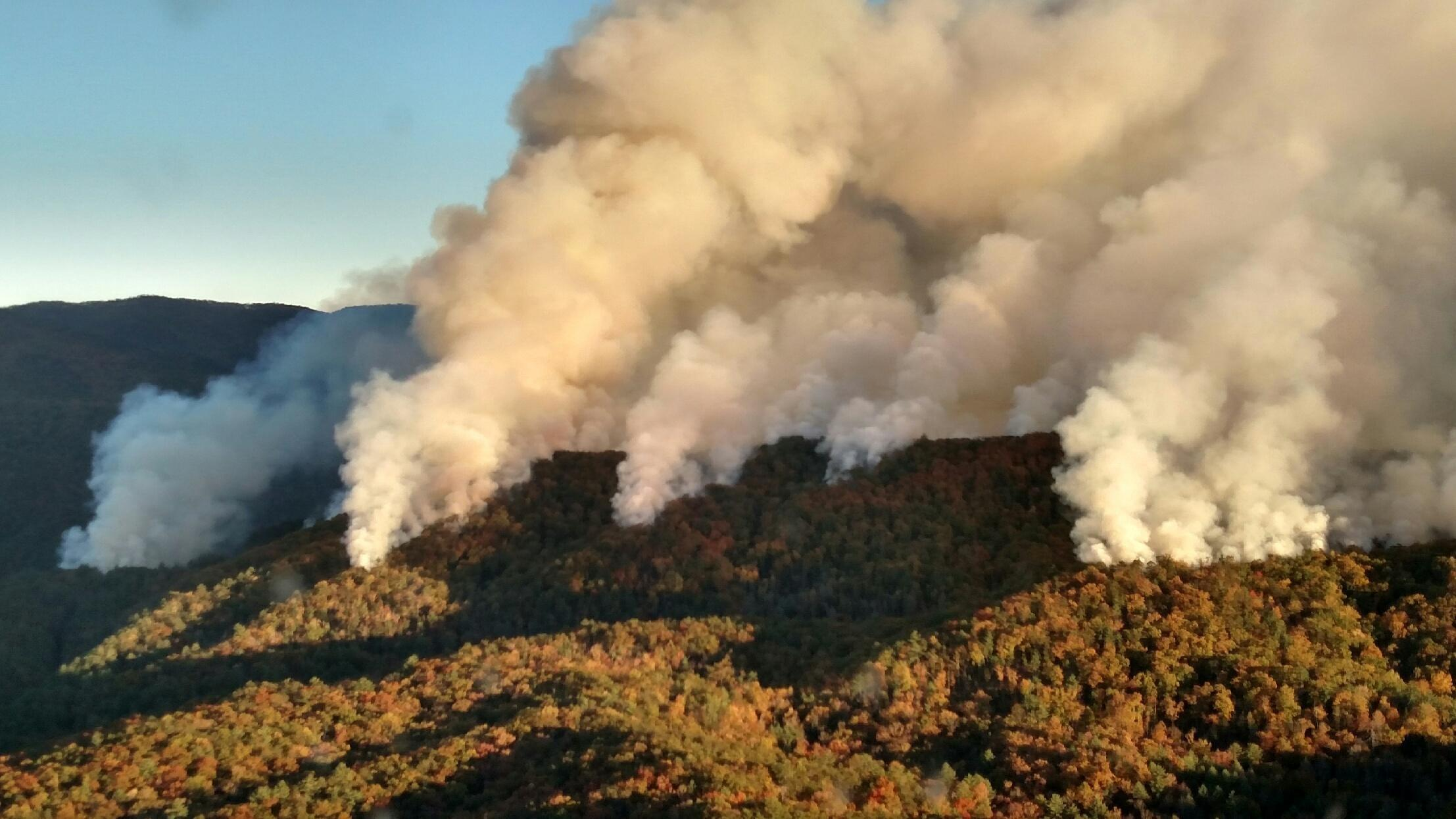
The Rough Ridge Fire burning the Cohutta Wilderness

The Rough Ridge wildfire began on October 16, 2016, with a lightning strike. Due to drought conditions, the wildfire rapidly expanded to 27,870 acres. Fire management objectives prioritized allowing the fire to burn naturally while ensuring firefighter and public safety.

== Recreation ==
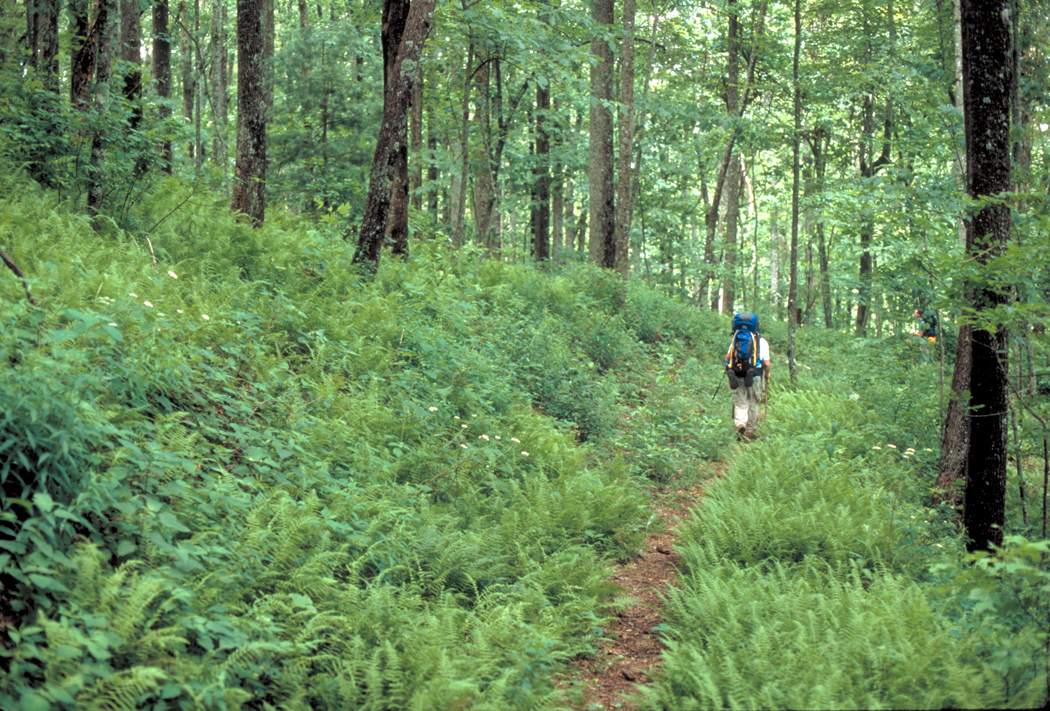
Rough Ridge Trail in the Cohutta Wilderness

The Cohutta Wilderness and surrounding area is a haven for hikers, fishermen, botanists, kayakers, mountain bikers, naturalists, and hunters, offering a variety of ecosystems that traverse remote gorges, ridgelines, river valleys, and hardwood forests. Some trails are open to horses. Originally, the southern terminus of the Appalachian Trail was planned to run through the wilderness and end on Cohutta Mountain in Murray County, Georgia but was moved more south due to the area's remoteness. The Benton MacKaye Trail cuts through the eastern side of the wilderness, while the Pinhoti National Recreation Trail bisects it, with its northern terminus just south of the wilderness where it joins the Benton MacKaye Trail. The highest point on the Pinhoti Trail, Buddy Cove Gap, reaches 3,164 feet (964 m) near the Cohutta Wilderness.

The Cohutta Wilderness offers an extensive network of trails maintained by volunteers catering to hikers and backpackers of varying skill levels. Encompassing approximately 127 hiking miles spanning two states elevations range from a high of 4,224 feet atop Big Frog Mountain (Hemp Top Trail) to an elevation of 978 feet at the Alaculsy Valley Trailhead of the Jacks River Trail.

Trails are open year-round. Some trailhead parking lots are inaccessible from January 1 through early March due to annual winter gate closures but the trails remain open from other trailheads. The trailhead parking lots affected by winter road closures are Tearbritches, Chestnut Lead, Betty Gap and Three Forks. This closure is in effect annually from January through early March. The closest "gateway" towns to the Wilderness area are Chatsworth, Ellijay, and Blue Ridge, Georgia.

== See also ==
- List of U.S. Wilderness Areas
- Cohutta Mountains
- Wilderness Act
