= Panther Creek Falls Trail =

Hiking trail in the Cohitta Mountains

Coordinates: 34°53′59″N 84°35′44″W

Panther Creek Falls Trail is an interior hiking trail in Georgia's Cohutta Mountains, in Fannin County, northwest of Ellijay, at the southern end of the Smoky Mountains. The trail falls within the 35,000-acre Cohutta Wilderness, part of the Wilderness's 87 mile (140 km) trail system. As an interior trail, Panther Creek Falls cannot be accessed by road, but only via other hiking trails. Eastern access is via the East Cowpen Trail, and its western access via the Conasauga River Trail. The trail starts at the confluence of Panther Creek and the Conasauga River.

Total distance of the trail is roughly 3.5 miles (5.6 km). Campsites are located approximately 1.5 miles (2.4 km) down the trail. The trail runs along an old railroad line for the first mile, then climbs through a boulder field to the top of Panther Creek Falls, where one achieves a panoramic view of the Conasauga River Valley. From the falls, the trail climbs to its eastern termination at East Cowpen Trail.
