= National Register of Historic Places listings in Murray County, Georgia =

This is a list of properties and districts in Murray County, Georgia that are listed on the National Register of Historic Places (NRHP).

This National Park Service list is complete through NPS recent listings posted October 16, 2026.

== Current listings ==
	Name on the Register	Image	Date listed	Location	City or town	Description
1	Carter's Quarters		March 17, 1986 (#86000460)	Old U.S. Route 411, 9 miles south of Chatsworth; 34°39′27″N 84°42′47″W	Chatsworth	
2	Chatsworth Downtown Historic District	Chatsworth Downtown Historic District	July 13, 2005 (#05000693)	Roughly bounded by Peachtree St., 1st Ave., CSX railroad tracks, Fort St., and 4th Ave. 34°46′04″N 84°46′06″W	Chatsworth	
3	Fort Mountain	Fort Mountain	November 23, 1977 (#77001587)	U.S. Route 76; 34°47′03″N 84°42′24″W	Chatsworth	
4	Murray County Courthouse	Murray County Courthouse	September 18, 1980 (#80001123)	Courthouse Sq. 34°46′01″N 84°46′14″W	Chatsworth	
5	Murray County High School Historic District	Murray County High School Historic District	June 21, 2004 (#04000628)	1004 Green St. 34°46′37″N 84°47′20″W	Chatsworth	
6	Pleasant Valley Historic District	Pleasant Valley Historic District	September 24, 2009 (#09000751)	Roughly bounded by the CSX railroad line, the old city limits, and land lot lines 34°50′55″N 84°44′56″W	Crandall	
7	Spring Place Historic District		January 4, 2005 (#04000338)	Approximately 2.5 miles west of Chatsworth, east of the junction of State Routes 52A and 225; 34°45′37″N 84°48′59″W	Spring Place	
8	Vann House	Vann House	October 28, 1969 (#69000044)	Junction of U.S. Route 76 and State Route 225; 34°45′50″N 84°50′35″W	Spring Place	A Georgia state historic site
9	Wright Hotel	Wright Hotel	June 17, 1982 (#82002456)	201 E. Market St. 34°46′03″N 84°46′06″W	Chatsworth	
