= Wright Hotel =

Historic hotel in Georgia, US

- U.S. National Register of Historic Places
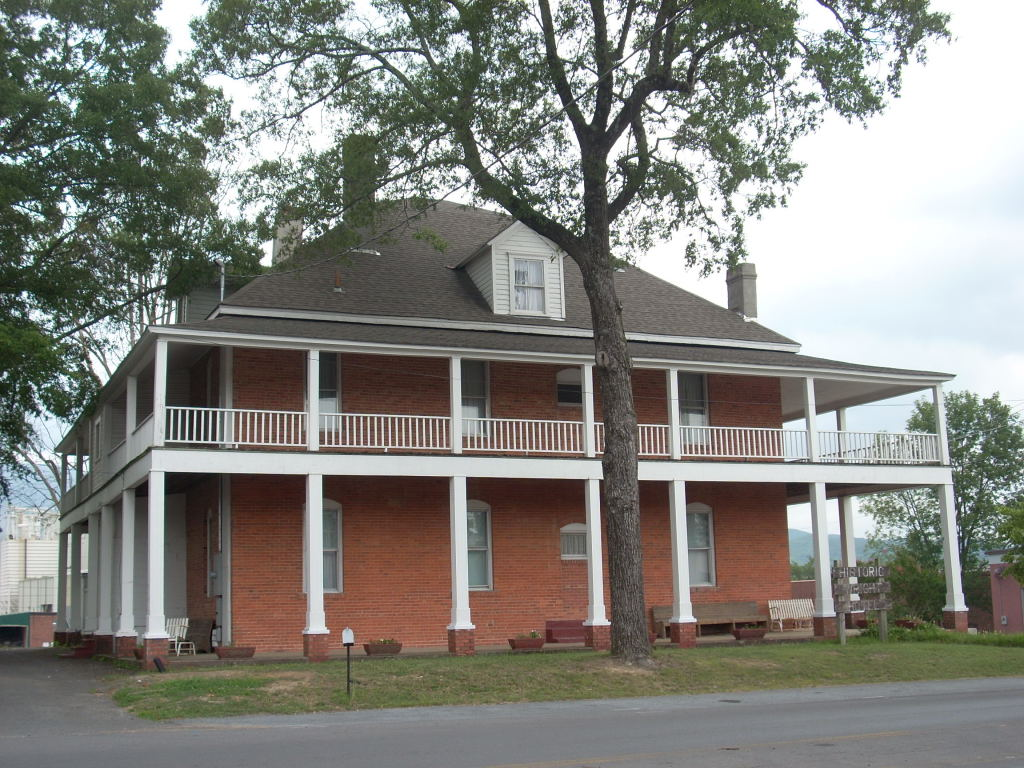

- Location within Georgia
- Location: 201 E. Market St., Chatsworth, Georgia
- Coordinates: 34°46′3″N 84°46′6″W
- Area: 0.5 acres (0.20 ha)
- Built: 1909
- Built by: Wright, Thomas M.; Banks, Thomas
- NRHP reference No.: 82002456
- Added to NRHP: June 17, 1982

Wright Hotel is a historic hotel at 201 East Market Street in Chatsworth, in Murray County, Georgia, that was built in 1909. It is a two-story brick building with two-story porches. It was added to the National Register of Historic Places in 1982.

Its NRHP nomination notes that the hotel

reflects its local, vernacular, do-it-yourself origins.

Built by its owner-operator, Thomas Monroe Wright, and his cousin, Thomas Banks, a builder from Cleveland, Tennessee, it shows few signs of high style architecture. Local materials were used as much as possible. Bricks were manufactured a few blocks away at the now defunct Chatsworth Brick Company. Timber was cut from Mr. Wright's nearby farm and aged for a year before being used in the hotel construction. The surrounding two-story porches made excellent use of one of the area's greatest resources, cool mountain air. The ten foot deep foundation and twelve inch thick exterior walls reflect the care with which Mr. Wright constructed the building. The hotel's modest scale, simplicity of design and structural solidity give it real integrity. The building no longer functions as a hotel, but it has survived

remarkably intact."

== See also ==
- National Register of Historic Places listings in Murray County, Georgia
