= Murray County High School =

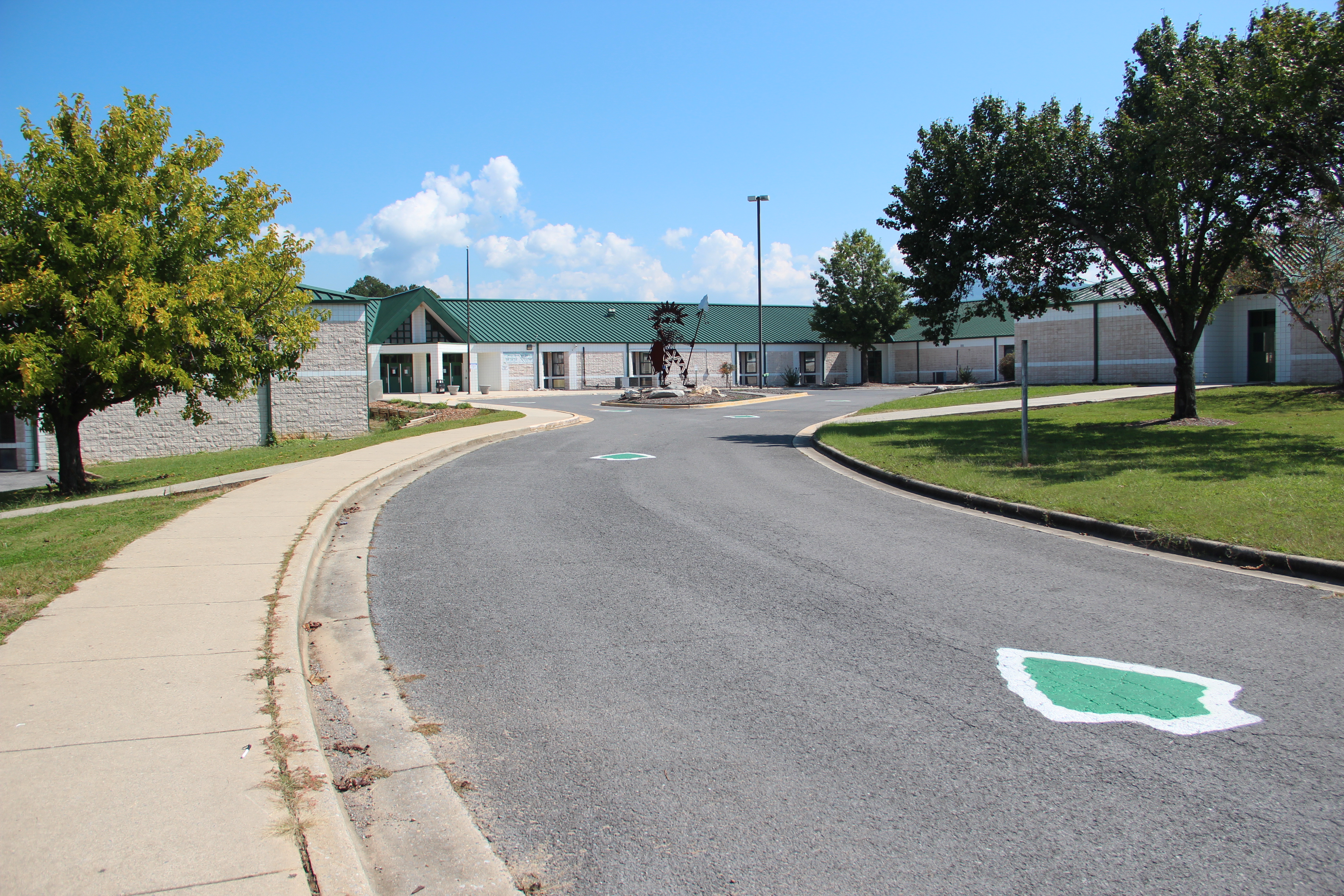

Location
- 1001 Green Road; Chatsworth, Murray County, Georgia 30705-2098; United States; 34.777127°N 84.788540°W

Information
- Type: Public
- School district: Murray County School District
- Principal: Andrea Morrow
- Teaching staff: 64.80 FTE
- Grades: 9–12
- Enrollment: 1,068 (2024–2025)
- Student to teacher ratio: 16.48
- Colors: Green and white
- Athletics conference: Class AA
- Mascot: Indian
- Team name: Indians
- Accreditation: Southern Association of Colleges and Schools
- Telephone: (706) 695-1414
- Fax: (706) 517-2625
- Website: https://www.murrayhigh.murray.k12.ga.us/o/mchs

Murray County High School (MCHS) is a public high school located in Chatsworth, Georgia, United States. It is part of the Murray County School District.

The school colors are green and white, and its mascot is the Indian. In athletics, it competes as a Division AA school in the Georgia High School Association.
