= Drowning Bear Creek =

Stream in Georgia, U.S.

Coordinates: 34°42′48″N 84°54′56″W

Drowning Bear Creek is a stream in the U.S. state of Georgia. It is a tributary to the Conasauga River.

The stream has the name of a local Cherokee Indian. Variant names are "Drownding Bear Creek" and "Bear Creek".
