= Carters, Georgia =

Unincorporated community in Georgia, U.S.

Coordinates: 34°36′32″N 84°41′35″W

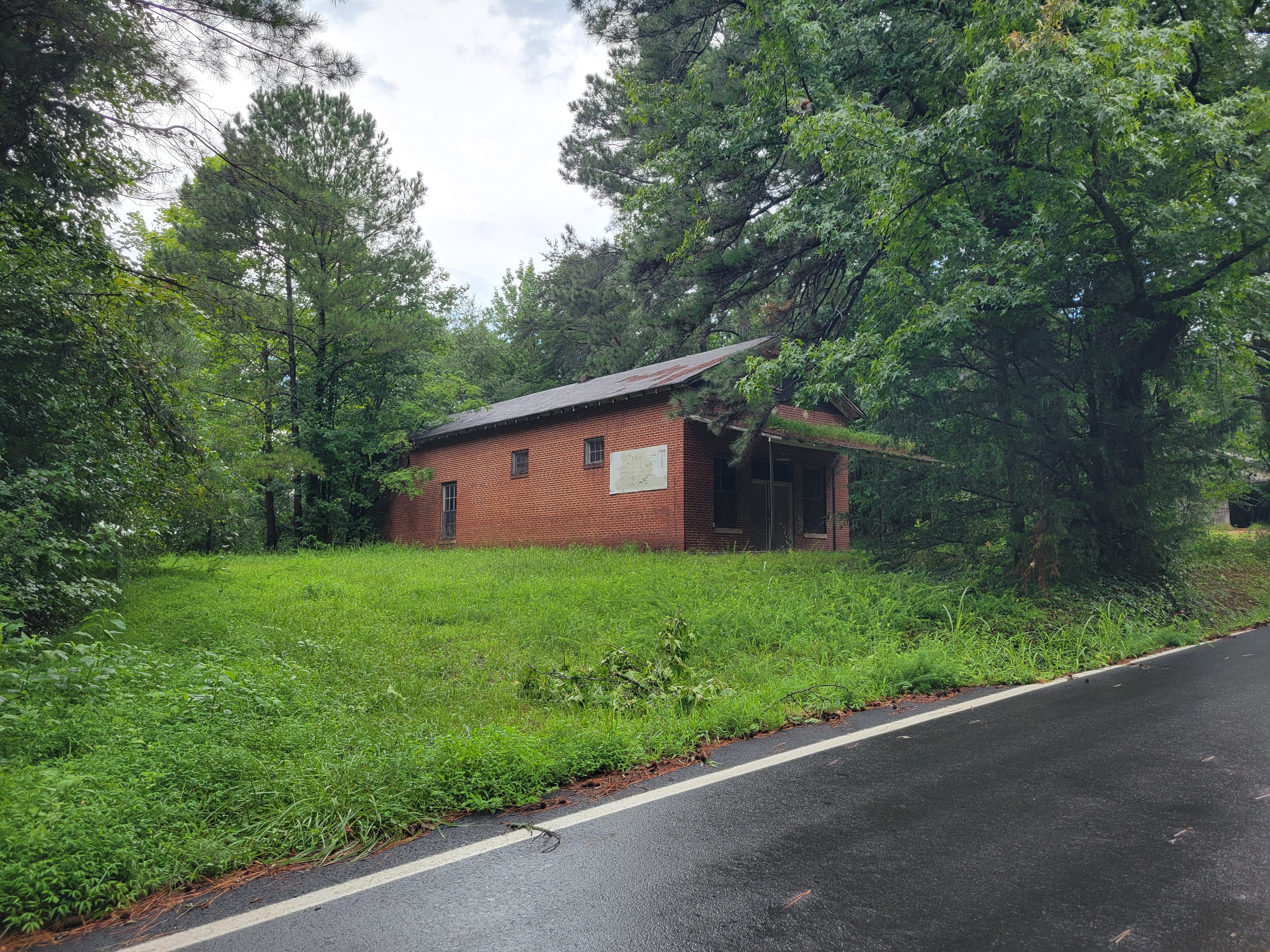
Building on Carters Road

Carters, formerly known as Carter's Quarter, is an unincorporated community in Murray County, Georgia, United States. Nearby Carters Lake, impounded by Carters Dam, takes its name from the community.

== History ==
The community was named after Farish Carter, who in 1833 had bought 15,000 acres of land, with the largest unit located in Murray County. In his youth, Carter had run away from home, made himself a substantial fortune, and was engaged in managing his numerous enterprises involving farms, steamboats, banks, ferries, factories, mills, and marble quarries, spread across the Southeastern United States and into the Midwest. He owned property in Murray County that he used as a summer home, in what was then known as Carter's Quarter. His farm grew wheat, rye, oats, corn, tobacco, peas, beans, potatoes, rice, and cotton, with the labor of his hundreds of slaves. On the 1850 census, Carter reported that he owned 403 slaves. Later that year he turned the family plantation over to his son James Carter, who was the first of the Carter family to live in Murray County all-year-round. The plantation continued to sustain the family, and the 1860 census indicates that 355 slaves remained on the property.

The Carters post office was discontinued in 1976.
