= Sumac Creek =

Stream in Georgia, U.S.

Coordinates: 34°52′38.28″N 84°49′5.79″W

Sumac Creek is a stream in the U.S. state of Georgia. It is a tributary to the Conasauga River.

Sumac Creek received its name from the Cherokee Indians of the area, on account of the sumac growing along the creek's course. Variant names are "Shewmake Creek", "Shoemak Creek", and "Sumach Creek".
