= Grassy Mountain (Georgia) =

Mountain in Georgia, United States

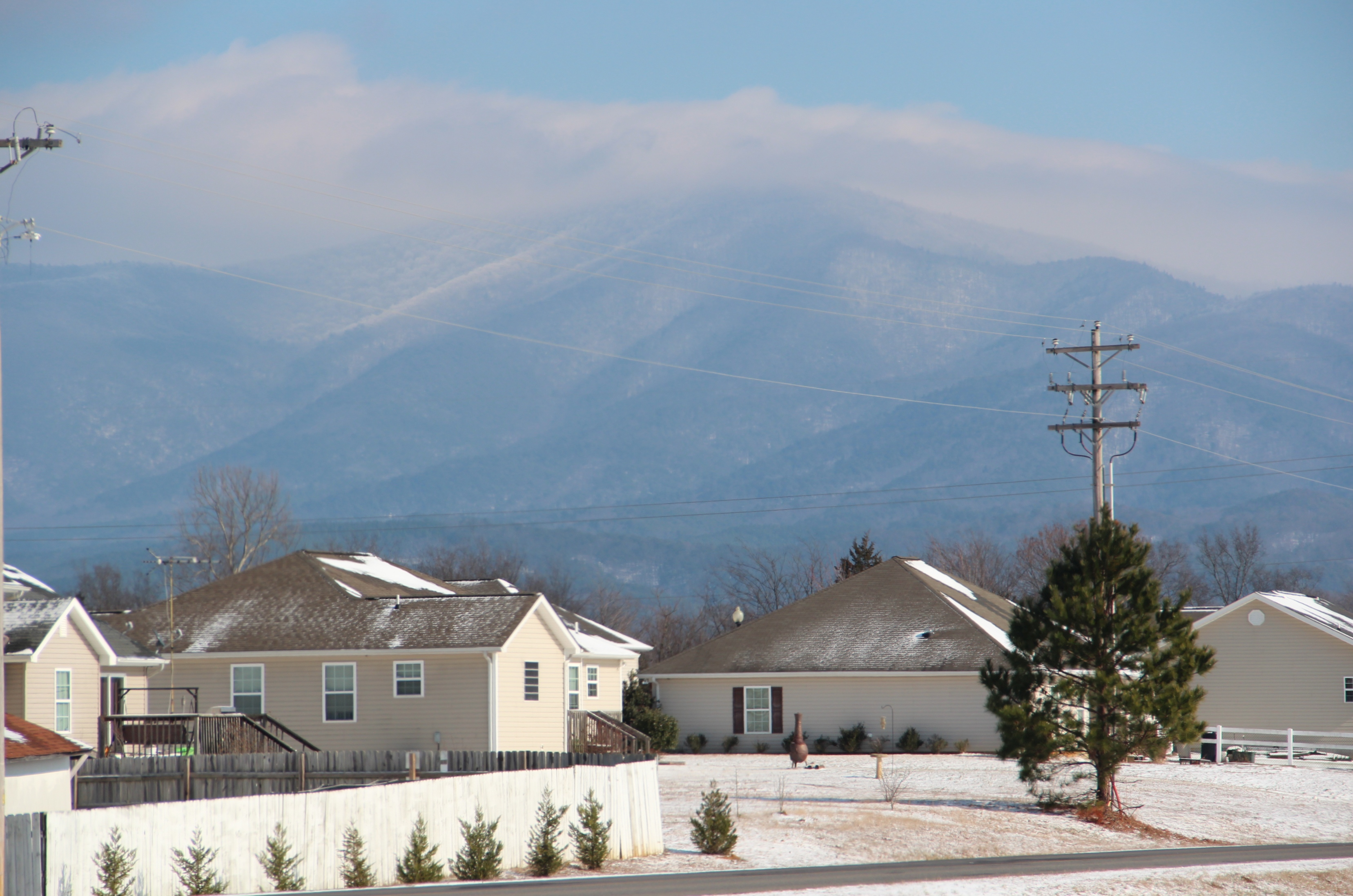
- Grassy Mountain viewed from Eton, Georgia

Highest point
- Elevation: 3,694 ft (1,126 m)
- Prominence: 494 ft (151 m)
- Coordinates: 34°51′46″N 84°40′19″W

Geography
- Location: Murray County, Georgia, U.S.
- Parent range: Cohutta Mountains
- Topo map: USGS Crandall

Climbing
- Easiest route: Drive

Grassy Mountain is a summit in Murray County, Georgia. At its highest point, the mountain has an elevation of 3,694 feet (1,126 m). It is the second tallest peak in Murray County, if using a 100 feet (30 m) prominence rule, behind nearby Bald Mountain.

== Geography ==
Grassy Mountain is located in the Chattahoochee-Oconee National Forest near Lake Conasauga. There is a fire lookout tower at the top of the mountain that offers views of Fort Mountain, the Cohutta Wilderness and the Ridge-and-Valley Appalachians.

== See also ==
- List of mountains in Georgia (U.S. state)
