= Tearbritches Creek =

Stream in Georgia, U.S.

Coordinates: 34°53′52.29″N 84°37′14.76″W

Tearbritches Creek is a stream in the U.S. state of Georgia. It is a tributary to the Conasauga River.

Tearbritches Creek was so named on account of the thick brush which lines its banks.
