= Kate Galt Zaneis =

American educator

President of Southeastern Oklahoma State Teachers College
- In office 1935–1937
- Preceded by: Wade H. Schumate
- Succeeded by: W. B. Morrison

Personal details
- Born: Kathrine Benton Galt; February 17, 1887 Spring Place, Georgia
- Died: September 9, 1973 (aged 86) Ardmore, Oklahoma
- Spouse: H. P. Zaneis (m. 1913-1915; divorced)
- Education: Southeastern Oklahoma State Teachers College

Kate Galt Zaneis (February 17, 1887 - September 9, 1973) was an American educator. In May 1935, she became president of Southeastern Oklahoma State Teachers College, becoming the first woman to lead a state college or university in the United States.

== Early life ==
Born Kathrine Benton Galt in Spring Place, Georgia, Zaneis was the fourth of eight children, four sons and four daughters, of James Edward and Miriam (Otis) Galt. The family lived in Ardmore, Oklahoma, but would return to Georgia for Miriam to give birth; not long thereafter, they returned westward.

Kate graduated from high school in Ardmore in 1907; she was immediately hired by school superintendent Charles Evans to teach. In 1913, she married H. P Zaneis, moving with him to Wirt, Oklahoma; two years later, divorced, she returned to Ardmore to serve as principal of Lincoln Ward School. In 1915, she became superintendent of Lone Grove High School, at the same time joining the summer teaching faculty at Southeastern Oklahoma State Teachers College. In 1920, working towards a bachelor's degree at the same institution, she was elected superintendent of schools in Carter County, pledging to consolidate rural schools. She also worked to improve the condition of schools for black children in the county.

Upon completing her term as superintendent, Zaneis enrolled at Southeastern Oklahoma State, from which she graduated in 1926. While in school, Zaneis met Pearl Brent, who her mother hired to be the family's housekeeper. Brent remained Zaneis' housekeeper, assistant, and best friend for the rest of their lives. After graduating, Zaneis returned to Carter County to teach.

When the Great Depression caused funding shortfalls which resulted in teachers being paid in warrants, Zaneis condemned the practice. Her position on this issue led her to support E. W. Marland in his campaign for governor, during which she served as his campaign director for Carter County. She was rewarded after his election with a position on the Oklahoma State Board of Education; among her achievements on that body was approval of sabbatical leaves for college faculty.

On the cusp of receiving her master's degree from Oklahoma A&M, she was named president of Southeastern Oklahoma State Teachers College by Governor Marland, effective May 20, 1935. In accepting the position, Zaneis became the first woman to head a state institution of higher learning in the United States; regardless, she stated in an interview that she expected to "succeed or fail in this job on my own merits, without the fact that I'm the only woman to head a state college."

== Tenure as college president ==
Zaneis' tenure in the role was short and not without controversy, beginning when she appointed her favorite instructor, Dr. Everett Fixley, as dean, and continuing with the firing of faculty members without master's degrees. Furthermore, the salaries of the higher-paid men on staff were cut to adjust the pay scale of female faculty members, causing problems with townspeople. Successes included the securing of Public Works Administration funds to improve buildings and athletic fields on campus; mandatory political donations from faculty were ended, enrollment increased by 30%, and student work programs were funded.

She secured a speaking appearance by Eleanor Roosevelt. But public sentiment in Oklahoma was turning against the New Deal, and with the men of the faculty upset the State Board of Education fired Zaneis from her post in May 1937. Another woman would not be named to the school's presidency until Joe Anna Hibbler took the position in 1991.

Zaneis' firing inspired the formation of the Women's Democratic Council, a group of local activists who believed she was fired because of her gender; Zaneis led the group, which advocated for women's participation in politics, for six years.

== Later life ==
Zaneis continued her work in her chosen field, serving as director of education for the Oklahoma Department of Public Safety and working on the state's school lunch program, first through the Oklahoma Department of Public Welfare and later through the Oklahoma Department of Education. In later years, she transferred between various state agencies, including a stint with the newly formed Civil Defense Agency in the 1950s, before retiring in 1963 and moving back to her native Ardmore with Brent. In 1973, Brent died unexpectedly of a sudden fall; Zaneis was distraught over her death and never recovered.

She died on September 9, 1973, at Ardmore Memorial Hospital, aged 86. She was buried in Ardmore's Rosehill Cemetery. A school in Carter County, erected in 1923, was named for Zaneis, while her portrait, painted by Southeastern Oklahoma State Teachers College faculty member Minnie Baker, is displayed at the Oklahoma Historical Society.
