= Murray County School District =

School district in Georgia (U.S. state)

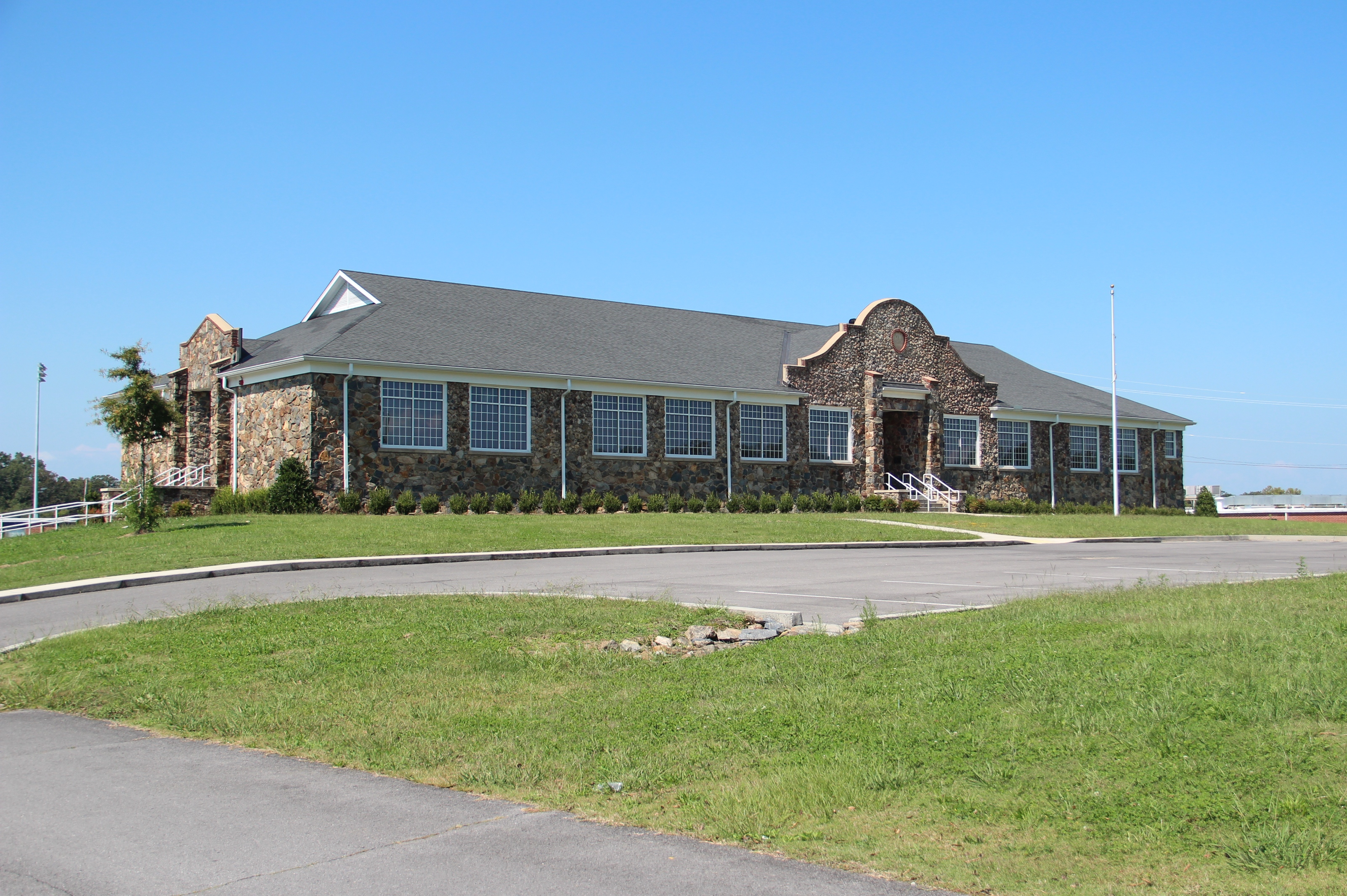
- Murray County School District offices

Address
- 1006 Green Road Chatsworth, Georgia, 30705-2363; United States
- Coordinates: 34.774977°N 84.783637°W

District information
- Grades: Pre-school - 12
- Superintendent: Dr Tim Wright
- Accreditations: Southern Association of Colleges and Schools; Georgia Accrediting Commission

Students and staff
- Enrollment: 4,375
- Faculty: 451

Other information
- Telephone: (706) 695-4531
- Fax: (706) 695-8425
- Website: www.murray.k12.ga.us

The Murray County School District is a public school district in Murray County, Georgia, United States, based in Chatsworth. It serves the communities of Chatsworth and Eton.

== Schools ==
The Murray County School District has six elementary schools, two middle schools, and two high schools.

=== Elementary schools ===
- Chatsworth Elementary School
- Coker Elementary School
- Eton Elementary School
- Northwest Elementary School
- Spring Place Elementary School
- Woodlawn Elementary School

=== Middle school ===
- Gladden Middle School
- New Bagley Middle School

=== High schools ===
- Murray County High School
- North Murray High School

=== Academy ===
- Pleasant Valley Innovative
