= Holly Creek =

Creek in Murray County, Georgia, in the United States

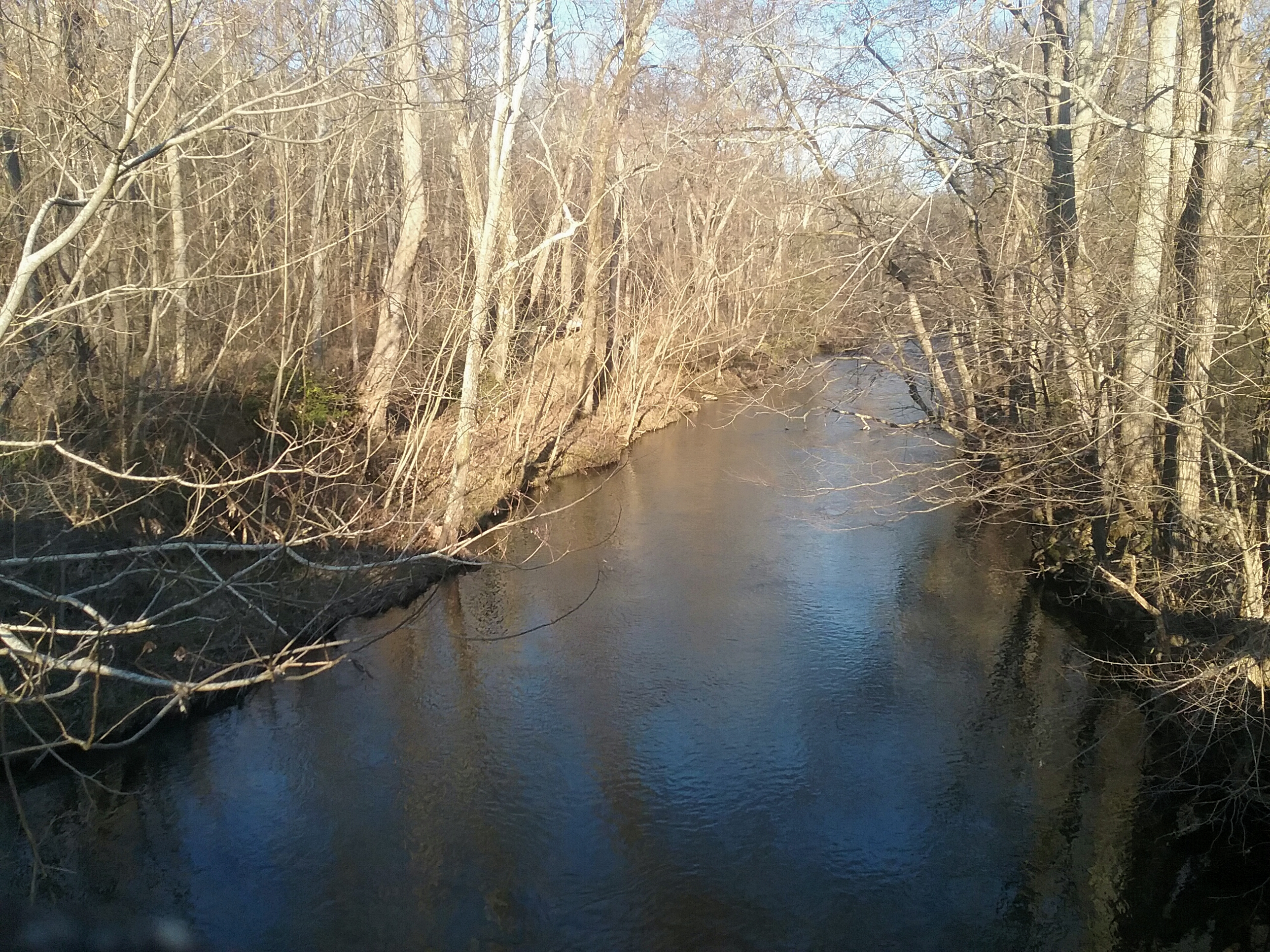
- Holly Creek: view east from Warren D Earnest Sr Bridge on Holly Creek-Cool Springs Road

Location
- Country: United States
- State: Georgia
- County: Murray
- Forest: Chattahoochee National Forest
- Preserve: Holly Creek Preserve

Physical characteristics
- Source: Mountain spring
  - location: Chattahoochee National Forest, Cohutta Wilderness, near Murray County, Georgia United States
  - coordinates: 34°50′09.8″N 84°35′47.2″W
  - elevation: 3,120 ft (950 m)
- Mouth: Conasauga River
  - location: Murray County, Georgia United States
  - coordinates: 34°42′17.3″N 84°53′27.3″W
  - elevation: 650 ft (200 m)

Basin features
- Progression: Source spring in Cohutta Wilderness → Conasauga River
- Basin Name: Alaculsy Valley

Holly Creek is a stream in the U.S. state of Georgia. It is a tributary to the Conasauga River.

The creek's name comes from the Native Americans of the area, who saw holly growing along its course. An alternative spelling was "Holley Creek".

A portion of Holly Creek, near its source in the Cohutta Wilderness, runs through Holly Creek Preserve and is under the protection of The Nature Conservancy. The Conservancy's site states that Holly Creek, along with Dill Creek, is "a stronghold for diverse and rare aquatic species, whose health, in turn, affects the Conasauga." Holly Creek is important to the Conasauga Watershed. Reducing erosion and sediment in the stream is a goal of Georgia's water quality and conservation programs. Holly Creek is a habitat for freshwater mussels. It is a coldwater stream.

Holly creek flows in a westerly direction through the Chattahoochee National Forest in Murray County, Georgia, toward the Conasauga River at the Whitfield County line.

== Nearby branches ==
The following branches or streams connect to Holly Creek at the specified coordinates. These may be branches, tributaries, or streams that run confluently for a time. The unknown streams may or may not be named, but may be identified by their coordinates.

- Unknown at 34.818993°N 84.593320°W
- Moreland Branch 34.817186°N 84.601769°W
- Unknown at 34.807222°N 84.608726°W
- 3rd confluence (Boatwright Branch) 34.804230°N 84.614738°W
- Unknown at Mulberry Gap Road 34.800752°N 84.616641°W
- Unknown at 34.800455°N 84.618877°W
- Shanty Creek at 34.803876°N 84.629063°W
- Unknown at 34.804546°N 84.630316°W
- Unknown at 34.814600°N 84.644744°W
- Emery Creek 34.815486°N 84.649880°W
- Leadmine Branch (other name or confluent branch) 34.811401°N 84.660348°W
- Dill Creek 34.815345°N 84.666934°W
- Neal Branch (other name or nearby branch)
- Rigley Branch 34.814017°N 84.690244°W
- Mill Creek 34.814050°N 84.696568°W
- Muskrat Creek 34.812818°N 84.703937°W
- Dry Prong 34.783088°N 84.756607°W
- Rock Creek 34.782596°N 84.757070°W
- Unknown at 34.753265°N 84.764699°W
- Chicken Creek 34.717161°N 84.769412°W
- Lick Branch 34.707939°N 84.781677°W
- Stewart Branch 34.699098°N 84.786591°W
- Wright Branch (other name or nearby branch)
- Holly Creek widens (dam or reservoir?) 34.687538°N 84.787546°W
- Rock Creek 34.684328°N 84.786278°W
- Buck Creek 34.672930°N 84.808552°W
- Bullpen Branch 34.681391°N 84.837615°W
- Casey Springs Branch 34.681312°N 84.839023°W
- Unknown branch at 34.684210°N 84.848432°W
- Unknown branch1 (surrounds islet) 34.684726°N 84.848794°W
- Unknown branch2 (surrounds islet) 34.686535°N 84.851423°W
- Branch1 or 2 reconnects 34.687847°N 84.852931°W
- Pettiet Branch 34.689375°N 84.853864°W
- Unknown or fork of Pettiet 34.690356°N 84.855361°W
- Unknown, crosses oxbow curve (1) and reconnects 34.691189°N 84.861963°W
- Unknown at 34.694538°N 84.859284°W encompasses small islet
- Unknown at 34.694699°N 84.861341°W
- Fork encompasses islet 34.697061°N 84.860427°W
- Unknown, crossed oxbow curve (2) 34.695669°N 84.863205°W
- Unknown at 34.700539°N 84.887211°W
- Conasauga River (mouth of Holly Creek) 34.704804°N 84.890909°W
