= Spring Place, Georgia =

- Unincorporated community
- Location within Georgia Location within the United States
- Coordinates: 34°45′29″N 84°49′16″W
- Country: United States
- State: Georgia
- County: Murray
- Elevation: 709 ft (216 m)
- Time zone: UTC-5 (Eastern (EST))
  - Summer (DST): UTC-4 (EDT)
- Area codes: 706 & 762
- GNIS ID: 356549

Spring Place (also Poinset, Springplace) is an unincorporated community in Murray County, Georgia, United States.

== History ==
A post office was established at Spring Place in 1826. The community took its name from Spring Place Mission, a nearby Native American Moravian mission.

Spring Place held the county seat of Murray County from 1834 until the seat was transferred to Chatsworth in 1913.

The Georgia General Assembly incorporated Spring Place as a town in 1885. The town's municipal charter was repealed in 1995.

== Notable people ==
- Kate Galt Zaneis (1887–1973), educator, born in Spring Place
- Joseph Vann (1798-1844), Cherokee leader, born in Spring Place

== Historic site ==
Chief Vann House Historic Site is on the National Register of Historic Places listings in Murray County, Georgia as the Vann House.
