= Lake Conasauga =

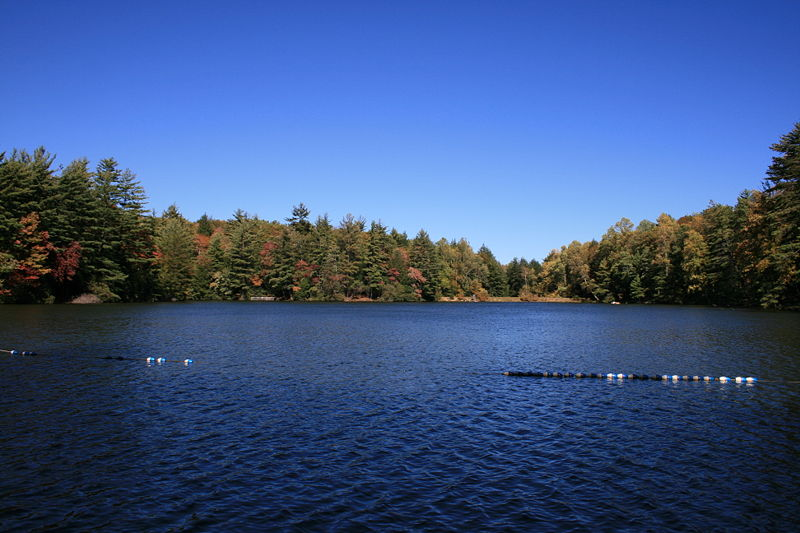
- View from the dock at the roped-off swimming area

- Location within Georgia Location within the United States
- Location: Chattahoochee National Forest, Murray County, Georgia, US
- Coordinates: 34°51′36″N 084°39′04″W
- Type: artificial lake
- Basin countries: United States
- Surface area: 19 acres (7.7 ha)
- Average depth: 5.4 ft (1.6 m)
- Max. depth: 30 ft (9.1 m)
- Surface elevation: 3,150 ft (960 m)

Lake Conasauga is a 19-acre (77,000 m^{2}) lake in the Lake Conasauga Campground located near the summit of Grassy Mountain in the Chattahoochee National Forest in northern Georgia, United States. It is the highest lake in Georgia at 3,150 feet (960 m) above sea level. It was built by the Civilian Conservation Corps, which finished it in 1940. "Conasauga" is a name derived from the Cherokee language meaning "grass".

Lake Conasauga camp ground is managed by the Armuchee-Cohutta Ranger District of the U.S. Forest Service. The area opens in mid-April and closes in late October

== Camping ==
One of the two group shelters that include a firepit, picnic tables, and grill

The campground has 35 family camping units located directly on the lake and in the surrounding woods with restrooms and water faucets. While each campsite has a tent pad, picnic table, fire ring and lantern post, there is no electricity available on the mountain.

== Day use ==
In addition to camping, the campground area also offers a Day Use area with a roped-off swimming area, picnic tables, grills, group shelters and restrooms as well as several hiking trails located on Grassy Mountain including the 1.2-mile (1.9 km) Lake Conasauga Trail, the 1.7-mile (2.7 km) Songbird Trail and the 2-mile (3.2 km) Grassy Mountain Tower Trail.

The lake was restocked with Bass (fish), bluegill, and trout several years ago and offers fishing from the bank or from the water only from canoes or electric-powered boats that can be launched from a boat ramp located across the lake from the Day Use area.
