= Bald Mountain (Murray County, Georgia) =

Mountain in Georgia, United States

Coordinates: 34°51′53″N 84°37′42″W

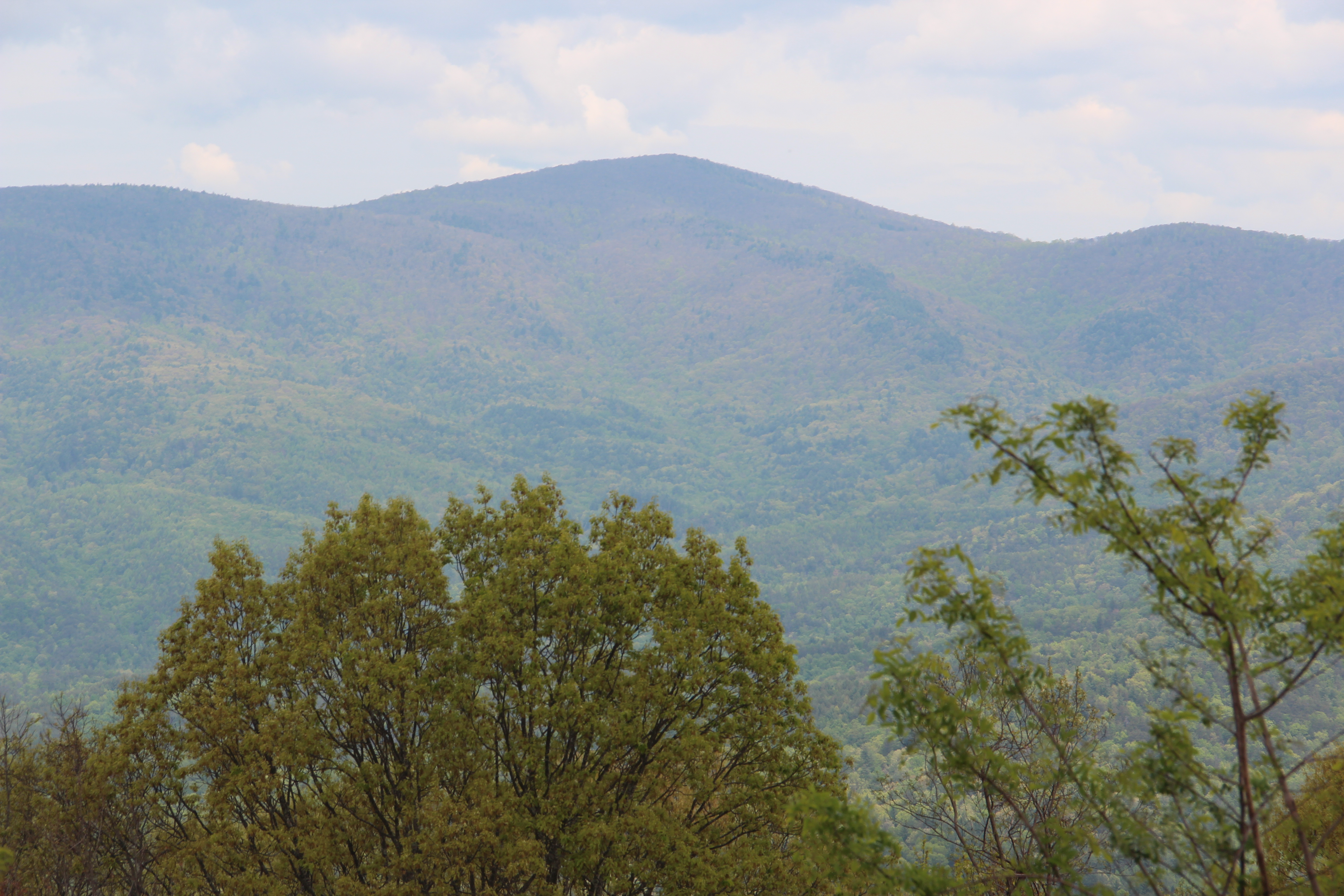
Bald Mountain viewed form Fort Mountain State Park

Bald Mountain is a summit in the U.S. state of Georgia. The elevation is 4,009 feet (1,222 m).

Bald Mountain was so named on account of its treeless apex. A variant name is Big Bald Mountain.
