= Crandall, Georgia =

- Unincorporated community
- Location within Georgia Location within the United States
- Coordinates: 34°52′00″N 84°44′44″W
- Country: United States
- State: Georgia
- County: Murray
- Elevation: 830 ft (250 m)
- Time zone: UTC-5 (Eastern (EST))
  - Summer (DST): UTC-4 (EDT)
- ZIP code: 30711
- Area codes: 706 & 762
- GNIS feature ID: 355363

Crandall is an unincorporated community in Murray County, Georgia, United States. The community is located along the concurrent U.S. Route 411, Georgia State Route 2, and Georgia State Route 61, 7 miles (11 km) north of Chatsworth. Crandall has a post office with ZIP code 30711.
