= Fightingtown Creek =

Stream in Georgia, U.S.

Coordinates: 34°59′31″N 84°22′49″W

Fightingtown Creek is a stream in the U.S. state of Georgia. It is a tributary to the Ocoee River.

Fightingtown is accurate preservation of its native Cherokee name, for near the site met warring tribal leaders.
