= Yellow lady's-slipper =

Yellow lady's-slipper may refer to any of three yellow orchids from the genus Cypripedium:

- Cypripedium calceolus, native to Eurasia
- Cypripedium parviflorum, native to North America
- Cypripedium flavum, native to China
