= Chatsworth, Georgia =

- City
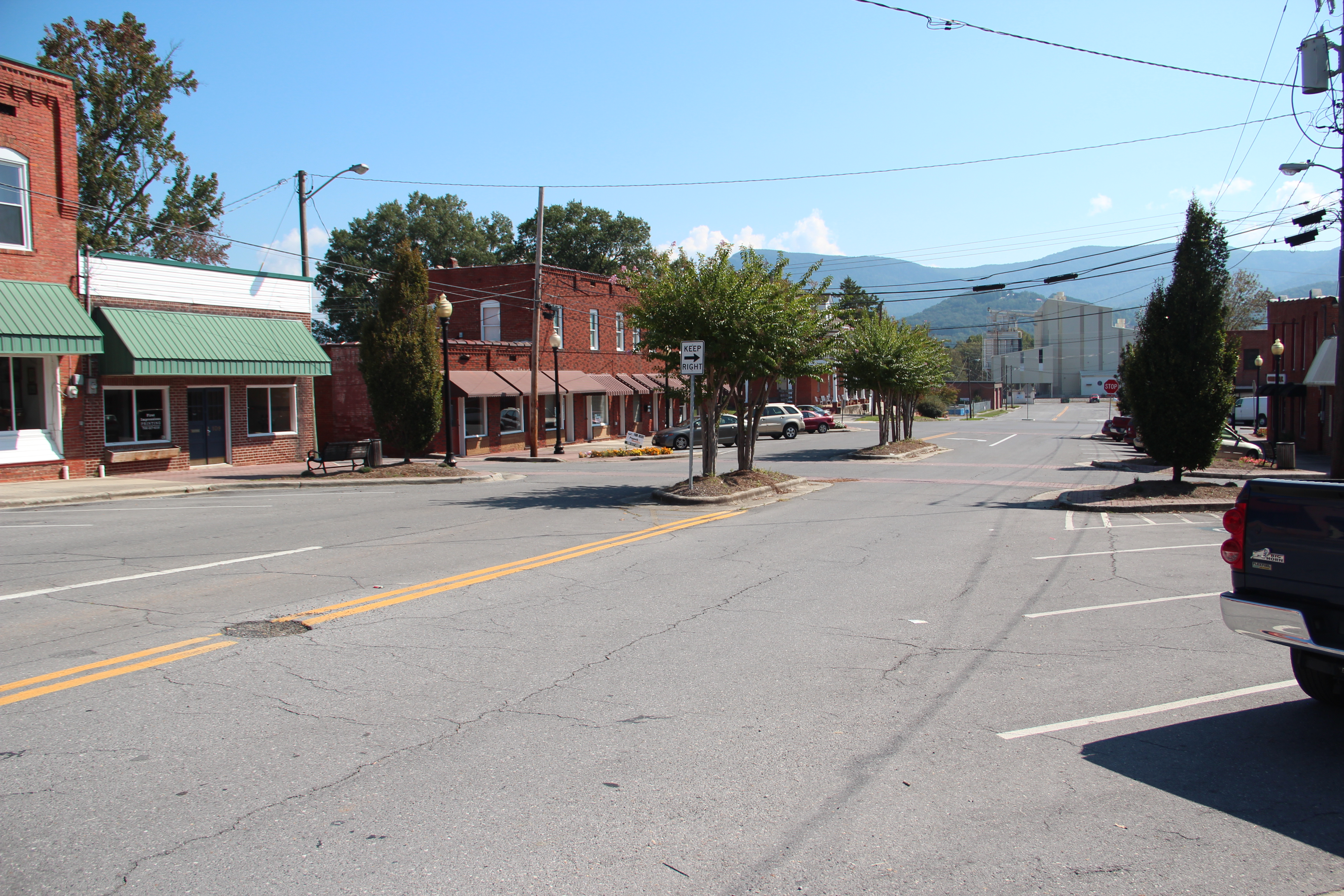
- Downtown Chatsworth

- Location in Murray County and the state of Georgia
- Coordinates: 34°46′20″N 84°46′44″W
- Country: United States
- State: Georgia
- County: Murray

Area
  - Total: 5.14 sq mi (13.3 km^{2})
  - Land: 5.13 sq mi (13.3 km^{2})
  - Water: 0.01 sq mi (0.026 km^{2})
- Elevation: 745 ft (227 m)

Population (2020)
  - Total: 4,874
  - Density: 916.9/sq mi (354.02/km^{2})
- Time zone: UTC-5 (Eastern (EST))
  - Summer (DST): UTC-4 (EDT)
- ZIP code: 30705
- Area codes: 706/762
- FIPS code: 13-15508
- GNIS feature ID: 03274178
- Website: www.chatsworthga.gov

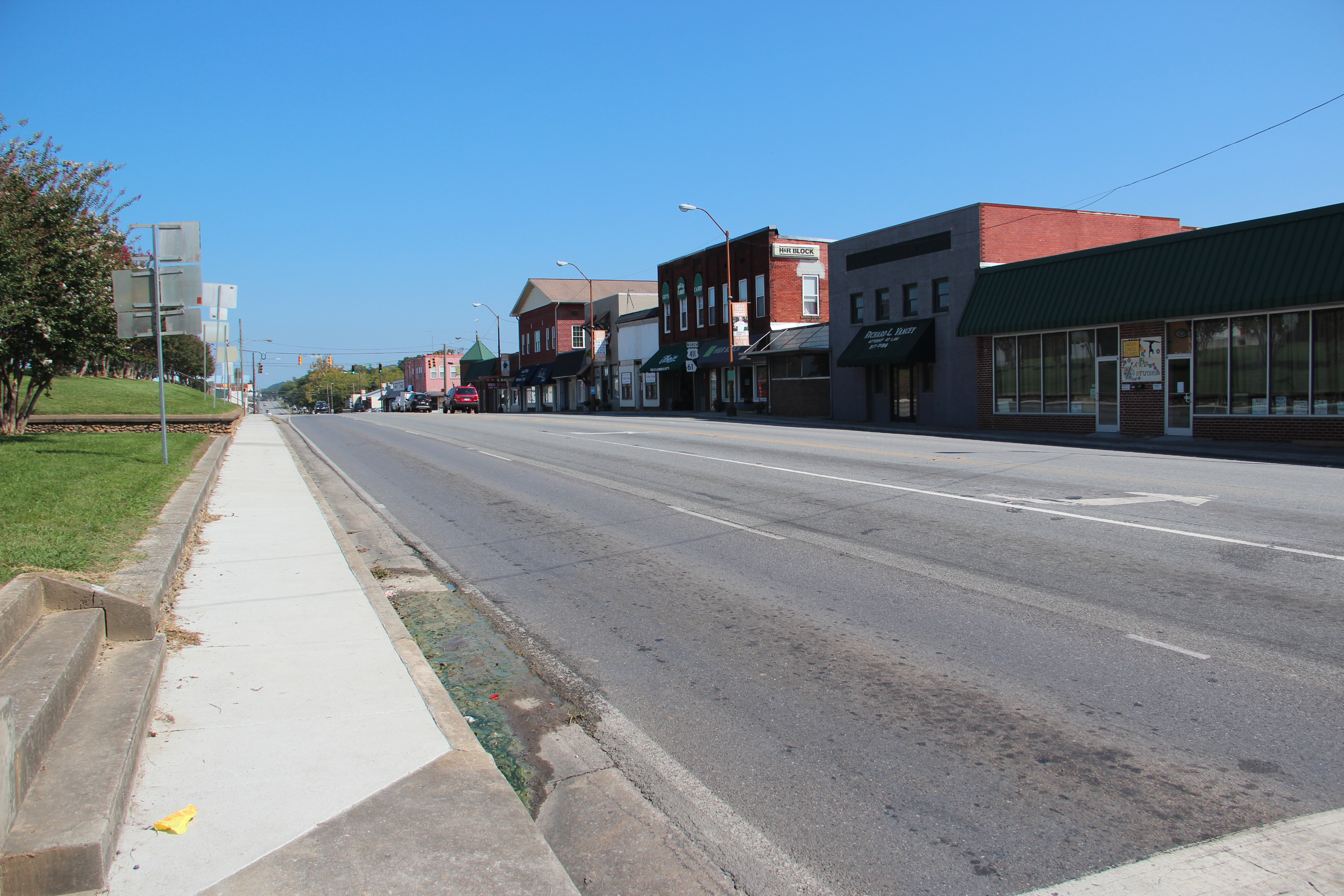
U.S. Route 411 in Chatsworth

Chatsworth is a city in and the county seat of Murray County, Georgia, United States. It is part of the Dalton, Georgia, Metropolitan Statistical Area. Its population was 4,874 at the 2020 census, up from 4,299 in 2010.

The city is the site of the coldest recorded temperature in Georgia, −17 °F (−27 °C) on January 27, 1940.

According to a popular legend, the town received its name after a road sign with the word "Chatsworth" fell off a passing freight train nearby. Someone put the sign on a post, and the name stuck.

== History ==
Chatsworth was founded in 1905 as a depot on the Louisville and Nashville Railroad. It was incorporated as a town in 1906 and as a city in 1923. In 1915, the seat of Murray County transferred to Chatsworth from Spring Place, which was once the county seat.

== Geography ==
Chatsworth is located in central Murray County at 34°46′20″N 84°46′44″W (34.772336, -84.778977), in northwestern Georgia. It sits at an elevation of 750 feet (230 m) on the west side of the valley of Holly Creek, with 2,840-foot (870 m) Fort Mountain and 2,780-foot (850 m) Cohutta Mountain rising over the valley to the east.

U.S. Routes 76 and 411 pass through the center of town on Third Avenue. US 76 leads 13 miles (21 km) west to Dalton and southeast 25 miles (40 km) to Ellijay, while US 411 leads south 24 miles (39 km) to Fairmount and north 31 miles (50 km) to Benton, Tennessee. Georgia State Routes 2 and 52 run together out of Chatsworth to the east, climbing into the Cohutta Mountains and passing through Fort Mountain State Park 7 miles (11 km) east of the city center.

According to the United States Census Bureau, Chatsworth has a total area of 5.1 square miles (13 km^{2}), of which 0.01 square miles (0.03 km^{2}), or 0.18%, are water. Holly Creek, which runs along the eastern edge of the city, is a south- and west-flowing tributary of the Conasauga River, part of the Oostanaula/Coosa/Alabama River watershed.

== Climate ==
According to the Köppen Climate Classification system, Chatsworth has a humid subtropical climate, abbreviated "Cfa" on climate maps. The hottest temperature recorded in Chatsworth was 105 °F (40.6 °C) on July 1, 2012, while the coldest temperature recorded was 2 °F (−16.7 °C) on January 30–31, 2014.

Climate data for Chatsworth, Georgia, 1991–2020 normals, extremes 1999–present
Month	Jan	Feb	Mar	Apr	May	Jun	Jul	Aug	Sep	Oct	Nov	Dec	Year
Record high °F (°C)	78 (26)	79 (26)	87 (31)	89 (32)	94 (34)	103 (39)	105 (41)	103 (39)	99 (37)	97 (36)	85 (29)	76 (24)	105 (41)
Mean maximum °F (°C)	67.9 (19.9)	72.1 (22.3)	79.9 (26.6)	84.5 (29.2)	89.4 (31.9)	94.5 (34.7)	95.7 (35.4)	96.0 (35.6)	92.5 (33.6)	86.3 (30.2)	76.8 (24.9)	70.1 (21.2)	97.8 (36.6)
Mean daily maximum °F (°C)	50.6 (10.3)	54.6 (12.6)	62.7 (17.1)	72.0 (22.2)	79.2 (26.2)	85.9 (29.9)	89.2 (31.8)	88.7 (31.5)	83.7 (28.7)	73.6 (23.1)	62.4 (16.9)	53.2 (11.8)	71.3 (21.8)
Daily mean °F (°C)	40.5 (4.7)	44.0 (6.7)	51.4 (10.8)	59.5 (15.3)	67.4 (19.7)	75.1 (23.9)	78.5 (25.8)	77.6 (25.3)	72.0 (22.2)	61.0 (16.1)	50.2 (10.1)	43.3 (6.3)	60.0 (15.6)
Mean daily minimum °F (°C)	30.3 (−0.9)	33.3 (0.7)	40.1 (4.5)	47.1 (8.4)	55.7 (13.2)	64.3 (17.9)	67.7 (19.8)	66.6 (19.2)	60.3 (15.7)	48.4 (9.1)	38.0 (3.3)	33.3 (0.7)	48.8 (9.3)
Mean minimum °F (°C)	13.9 (−10.1)	19.2 (−7.1)	24.9 (−3.9)	31.8 (−0.1)	40.5 (4.7)	55.3 (12.9)	60.1 (15.6)	59.6 (15.3)	48.8 (9.3)	32.1 (0.1)	23.3 (−4.8)	20.3 (−6.5)	12.5 (−10.8)
Record low °F (°C)	2 (−17)	8 (−13)	14 (−10)	25 (−4)	33 (1)	44 (7)	52 (11)	52 (11)	39 (4)	26 (−3)	16 (−9)	5 (−15)	2 (−17)
Average precipitation inches (mm)	4.88 (124)	4.71 (120)	5.26 (134)	5.02 (128)	4.64 (118)	5.54 (141)	5.43 (138)	4.30 (109)	4.32 (110)	3.45 (88)	4.56 (116)	5.39 (137)	57.5 (1,463)
Average precipitation days (≥ 0.01 in)	10.8	11.2	11.3	9.6	9.9	12.2	10.9	9.8	7.8	7.0	8.6	10.9	120
Source 1: NOAA
Source 2: National Weather Service (mean maxima/minima 2006–2020)

== Demographics ==
Historical population
Census	Pop.	Note	%±
1910	314		—
1920	472		50.3%
1930	607		28.6%
1940	1,001		64.9%
1950	1,214		21.3%
1960	1,184		−2.5%
1970	2,706		128.5%
1980	2,493		−7.9%
1990	2,865		14.9%
2000	3,531		23.2%
2010	4,299		21.8%
2020	4,874		13.4%
U.S. Decennial Census

=== 2020 census ===
As of the 2020 census, Chatsworth had a population of 4,874. The median age was 36.7 years. 24.4% of residents were under the age of 18 and 16.6% of residents were 65 years of age or older. For every 100 females there were 95.1 males, and for every 100 females age 18 and over there were 90.7 males age 18 and over.

89.4% of residents lived in urban areas, while 10.6% lived in rural areas.

There were 1,775 households and 1,117 families in Chatsworth, of which 33.2% had children under the age of 18 living in them. Of all households, 44.3% were married-couple households, 15.6% were households with a male householder and no spouse or partner present, and 32.4% were households with a female householder and no spouse or partner present. About 29.7% of all households were made up of individuals and 14.1% had someone living alone who was 65 years of age or older.

There were 1,908 housing units, of which 7.0% were vacant. The homeowner vacancy rate was 2.2% and the rental vacancy rate was 5.1%.

Chatsworth racial composition
Race	Num.	Perc.
White (non-Hispanic)	3,382	69.39%
Black or African American (non-Hispanic)	29	0.59%
Native American	6	0.12%
Asian	54	1.11%
Other/mixed-race	161	3.3%
Hispanic or Latino	1,242	25.48%

=== 2010 census ===
As of the census of 2010, there were 4,299 people, 1,587 households, and 1,071 families residing in the city. The population density was 749.5 inhabitants per square mile (289.4/km^{2}). There were 1,546 housing units at an average density of 328.1 per square mile (126.7/km^{2}). The racial makeup of the city was 99.1% White, 0.5% African American, 0.1% Native American, 0.1% Asian, 0.2% Pacific Islander, 0% from other races, and 0% from two or more races. Hispanic or Latino people of any race were 0% of the population.

== Education ==
=== Murray County School District ===
The Murray County School District holds preschool to grade twelve, and consists of six elementary schools, two middle schools, two high schools, and once had an academy school which became another high school. The district has 451 full-time teachers and over 7,350 students.

== Healthcare ==
AdventHealth Murray purchased Murray Medical Center on December 15, 2020. Advent Health Murray is the only hospital in the Chatsworth/Murray County area.

== Notable people ==
- Charles L. Carnes, former chief justice of Fulton County State Court
- C. K. Fauver, former Major League Baseball pitcher for the Louisville Colonels
- Ladd McConkey, wide receiver for the Los Angeles Chargers
- Jody Ridley, NASCAR driver
- James L. Terry, U.S. Army lieutenant general
- Robert L. Vining Jr., former senior U.S. district judge
