= Murray County, Georgia =

County in Georgia, United States

- County
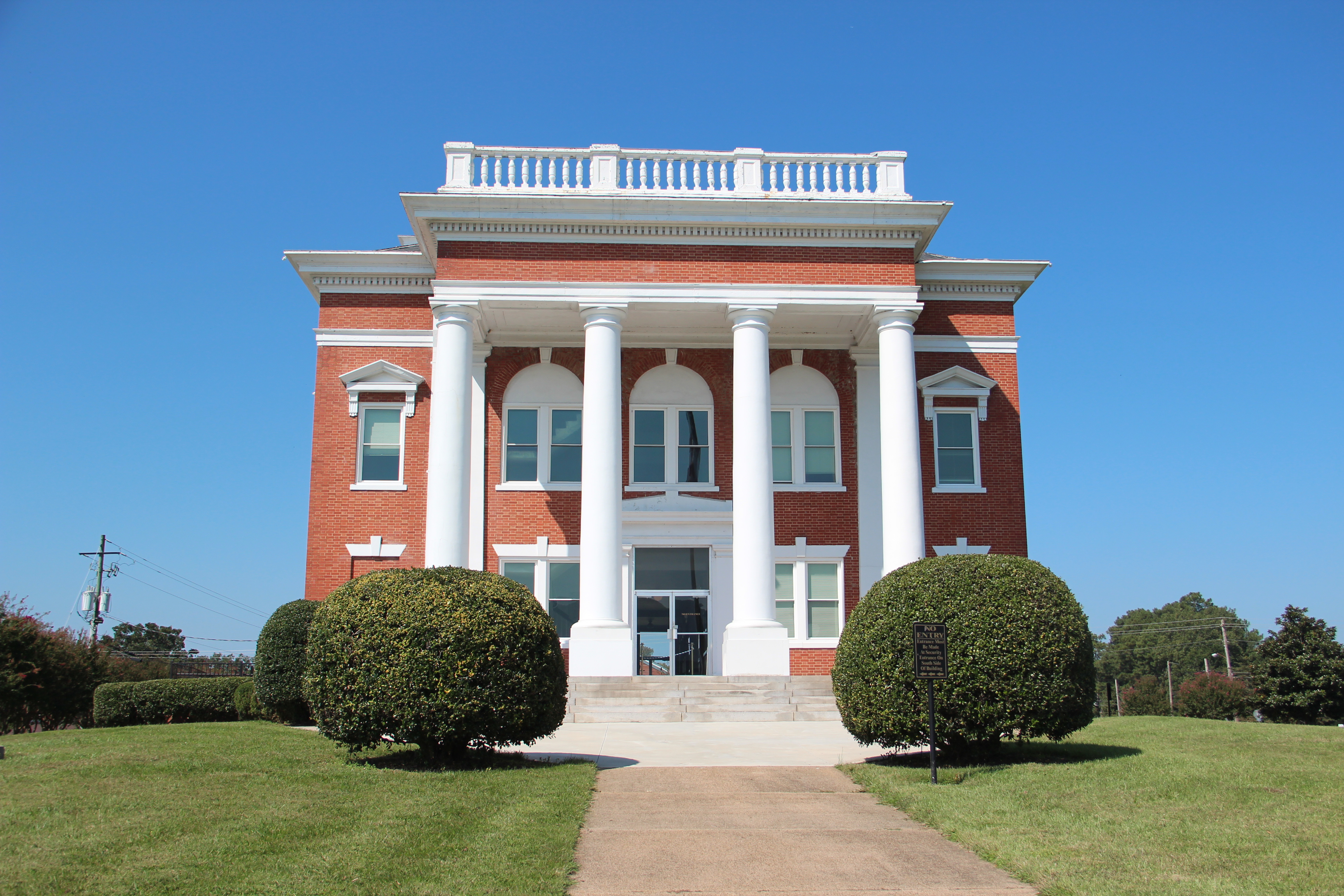
- Murray County courthouse in Chatsworth

- Location within the U.S. state of Georgia
- Coordinates: 34°47′N 84°45′W
- Country: United States
- State: Georgia
- Founded: 1832; 194 years ago
- Named for: Thomas W. Murray
- Seat: Chatsworth
- Largest city: Chatsworth

Area
  - Total: 347 sq mi (900 km^{2})
  - Land: 344 sq mi (890 km^{2})
  - Water: 2.2 sq mi (5.7 km^{2}) 0.6%

Population (2020)
  - Total: 39,973
  - Estimate (2025): 41,607 ▲
  - Density: 116/sq mi (44.9/km^{2})
- Time zone: UTC−5 (Eastern)
  - Summer (DST): UTC−4 (EDT)
- Congressional district: 14th
- Website: www.murraycountyga.org

Murray County is a county in the Northwest region of the U.S. state of Georgia. As of the 2020 census, the population was 39,973. The county seat is Chatsworth. Murray County is part of the Dalton, Georgia Metropolitan Statistical Area, which is also included in the Chattanooga-Cleveland-Dalton, TN-GA-AL Combined Statistical Area.

== History ==
In December 1832 the Georgia General Assembly designated the extreme northwestern corner of the state as Murray County. Formerly part of Cherokee County, the area was named for a distinguished Georgia statesman from Lincoln County, Thomas W. Murray, a former speaker of the Georgia House. Within a short time the legislature found the county was too large to administer properly as the population grew, for the county then included what is now Dade, Walker, Catoosa, Whitfield, Murray, Gordon and parts of Bartow and Chatooga Counties, so further division became necessary. Within two decades, Murray County came to be 342 square miles (886 km^{2}) of land with Spring Place as its county seat until the railroad was built through Chatsworth. With Chatsworth more accessible, the county seat was moved there.

=== Cherokees ===
The area was in the heart of the Cherokee Nation at the time the boundary lines were drawn through the territory. Not until after the Cherokees were removed in 1838–39 did white settlers enter the county in large numbers. Spring Place had been established in 1801 as a Moravian mission to the Cherokee and had been a post office since 1810 – the second oldest in North Georgia. After the Cherokee removal, the Moravians relocated with the tribe in what is now Oklahoma to establish New Springplace near the town of Oaks, Oklahoma. Sometime during the late 19th century, James B. Brackett donated the land upon which the Brackett Indian School was built. The school did not always function as a segregated Indian school. At one point in its previously integrated history, it was referred to as the Lone Cherry School.

The Brackets were a notable Eastern Cherokee family who lived along Brackett's Ridges, amongst several other American Indian families, several of which were also Eastern Cherokee. Most of the Brackets were forced to leave Georgia during the Trail of Tears earlier in the 19th century; however, some of them returned to Georgia several years later. James Brackett's brother Adam Brackett, along with several other siblings show up on the Dawes Rolls as being enrolled members of the Cherokee Nation of Oklahoma.

=== Civil War ===
At the outbreak of the American Civil War, Murray County had no industry and very little wealth. When Georgia seceded from the Union, hundreds of men and boys.from Murray enlisted in the Confederate Army. The following units were from Murray County:

- 3rd Battalion, Georgia Infantry, Company B, Spring Place Volunteers
- 11th Regiment, Georgia Infantry, Company C, Murray Rifle Company
- 22nd Regiment, Georgia Infantry, Company D
- 37th Regiment, Georgia Infantry, Company A
- 39th Regiment, Georgia Infantry, Company A, Cohutta Rangers
- 39th Regiment, Georgia Infantry, Company B
- 19th State Troops – Capt. John Oats Company

In 1864, two skirmishes between Union and Confederate soldiers took place just to the west of Spring Place, one of which took place on June 25, 1864, with the 8th Michigan Cavalry US. The First Tennessee Cavalry CS also skirmished about 5 miles north of Spring Place on April 19, 1864. Another skirmish took place near Westfield late during the night of August 22, 1864. Captain Woody of the Murray County Home Guard was reported wounded.

On February 27, 1865, and April 20, 1865, there was a skirmish at Spring Place between Confederates and the 145th Indiana Infantry US. This was followed by a skirmish on Holly Creek on March 1, 1865. By 1865 Spring Place was known as an area occupied by Confederate Guerrillas. During March 20–22, 1865 Union soldiers made an attempt to suppress this activity.

=== Railroad ===
In 1906, after two earlier attempts at building a railroad in Murray County had failed, the Louisville and Nashville line was built to run north to south through the entire length of the county. Murray grew, with new towns developing along the railroad. One of these new towns was named Chatsworth. With the new railroad line in place, timber could be shipped out of the mountains, and talc deposits, discovered in the 1870s, were able to be mined and the ore shipped throughout the country.

The old county seat of Spring Place was bypassed by the railroad. Some Murray Countians began an effort to move the county seat to the more central and accessible railroad town of Chatsworth. Much dissention was caused by this effort. A county-wide referendum was held on the matter in 1912, which resulted in Chatsworth being named as the seat of local government, where it remains to present day.

Into the twentieth century, Murray remained predominantly agricultural. Shortly after World War II the textile industry, prevalent in neighboring Whitfield County, began to move into Murray. Today, the carpet industry is the predominant employer in Murray County.

== Geography ==
According to the U.S. Census Bureau, the county has a total area of 347 square miles (900 km^{2}), of which 344 square miles (890 km^{2}) is land and 2.2 square miles (5.7 km^{2}) (0.6%) is water.

The majority of Murray County is located in the Conasauga River sub-basin in the ACT River Basin (Coosa-Tallapoosa River Basin), and the southeastern corner of the county is located in the Coosawattee River sub-basin of the same larger ACT River Basin.

=== Major highways ===
- U.S. Route 76
- U.S. Route 411 / State Route 61
- State Route 2
- State Route 52
  - State Route 52 Alternate
- State Route 136
- State Route 225
- State Route 282
- State Route 286

=== Adjacent counties ===
- Polk County, Tennessee (northeast)
- Fannin County (east-northeast)
- Gilmer County (east)
- Gordon County (south)
- Whitfield County (west)
- Bradley County, Tennessee (northwest)

=== National protected area ===
- Chattahoochee National Forest (part)

== Demographics ==
Historical population
Census	Pop.	Note	%±
1840	4,695		—
1850	14,443		207.6%
1860	7,083		−51.0%
1870	6,500		−8.2%
1880	8,269		27.2%
1890	8,461		2.3%
1900	8,623		1.9%
1910	9,763		13.2%
1920	9,490		−2.8%
1930	9,215		−2.9%
1940	11,137		20.9%
1950	10,676		−4.1%
1960	10,447		−2.1%
1970	12,986		24.3%
1980	19,685		51.6%
1990	26,147		32.8%
2000	36,506		39.6%
2010	39,628		8.6%
2020	39,973		0.9%
2025 (est.)	41,607	▲	4.1%
U.S. Decennial Census; 1790-1880 1890-1910; 1920-1930 1930-1940; 1940-1950 1960-1980; 1980-2000 2010 2020

=== Racial and ethnic composition ===
Murray County, Georgia – racial and ethnic composition Note: the US Census treats Hispanic/Latino as an ethnic category. This table excludes Latinos from the racial categories and assigns them to a separate category. Hispanics/Latinos may be of any race.
Race / ethnicity (NH = Non-Hispanic)	Pop 1980	Pop 1990	Pop 2000	Pop 2010	Pop 2020	% 1980	% 1990	% 2000	% 2010	% 2020
White alone (NH)	19,464	25,872	33,890	33,666	32,164	98.88%	98.95%	92.83%	84.96%	80.46%
Black or African American alone (NH)	32	41	191	212	263	0.16%	0.16%	0.52%	0.53%	0.66%
Native American or Alaska Native alone (NH)	28	43	94	94	79	0.14%	0.16%	0.26%	0.24%	0.20%
Asian alone (NH)	30	54	89	110	127	0.15%	0.21%	0.24%	0.28%	0.32%
Native Hawaiian or Pacific Islander alone (NH)	x	x	4	1	2	x	x	0.01%	0.00%	0.01%
Other race alone (NH)	0	1	3	15	58	0.00%	0.00%	0.01%	0.04%	0.15%
Mixed-race or multiracial (NH)	x	x	229	376	1,366	x	x	0.63%	0.95%	3.42%
Hispanic or Latino (any race)	131	136	2,006	5,154	5,914	0.67%	0.52%	5.49%	13.01%	14.79%
Total	19,685	26,147	36,506	39,628	39,973	100.00%	100.00%	100.00%	100.00%	100.00%

=== 2020 census ===
As of the 2020 census, there were 39,973 people, 14,718 households, and 10,557 families residing in the county. The median age was 38.8 years, 24.4% of residents were under the age of 18, and 15.4% were 65 years of age or older. For every 100 females there were 98.3 males, and for every 100 females age 18 and over there were 96.2 males age 18 and over. 32.0% of residents lived in urban areas, while 68.0% lived in rural areas.

The racial makeup of the county was 83.4% White, 0.7% Black or African American, 1.5% American Indian and Alaska Native, 0.3% Asian, 0.0% Native Hawaiian and Pacific Islander, 7.0% from some other race, and 7.0% from two or more races. Hispanic or Latino residents of any race comprised 14.8% of the population.

There were 14,718 households in the county, of which 33.9% had children under the age of 18 living with them and 24.3% had a female householder with no spouse or partner present. About 22.9% of all households were made up of individuals and 10.2% had someone living alone who was 65 years of age or older.

There were 16,038 housing units, of which 8.2% were vacant. Among occupied housing units, 68.7% were owner-occupied and 31.3% were renter-occupied. The homeowner vacancy rate was 1.0% and the rental vacancy rate was 6.1%.

=== 2010 census ===
As of the 2010 United States census, there were 39,628 people, 14,080 households, and 10,677 families living in the county. The population density was 115.0 inhabitants per square mile (44.4/km^{2}). There were 15,979 housing units at an average density of 46.4 per square mile (17.9/km^{2}). The racial makeup of the county was 89.1% white, 0.6% black or African American, 0.4% American Indian, 0.3% Asian, 0.1% Pacific islander, 7.9% from other races, and 1.6% from two or more races. Those of Hispanic or Latino origin made up 13.0% of the population. In terms of ancestry, 40.1% were American, 8.8% were Irish, 7.8% were English, and 5.0% were German.

Of the 14,080 households, 39.9% had children under the age of 18 living with them, 56.6% were married couples living together, 12.8% had a female householder with no husband present, 24.2% were non-families, and 19.8% of all households were made up of individuals. The average household size was 2.80 and the average family size was 3.20. The median age was 36.2 years.

The median income for a household in the county was $38,226 and the median income for a family was $45,420. Males had a median income of $33,543 versus $27,797 for females. The per capita income for the county was $16,925. About 14.3% of families and 17.1% of the population were below the poverty line, including 23.1% of those under age 18 and 12.9% of those age 65 or over.

=== 2000 census ===
As of the census of 2000, there were 36,506 people, 13,286 households, and 10,256 families living in the county. The population density was 41/km^{2} (110/mi^{2}). There were 14,320 housing units at an average density of 16/km^{2} (41/mi^{2}). The racial makeup of the county was 95.30% White, 0.62% Black or African American, 0.29% Native American, 0.25% Asian, 0.01% Pacific Islander, 2.64% from other races, and 0.88% from two or more races. 5.49% of the population were Hispanic or Latino of any race.

There were 13,286 households, out of which 39.00% had children under the age of 18 living with them, 60.80% were married couples living together, 11.10% had a female householder with no husband present, and 22.80% were non-families. 18.80% of all households were made up of individuals, and 6.00% had someone living alone who was 65 years of age or older. The average household size was 2.73 and the average family size was 3.10.

In the county, the population was spread out, with 28.00% under the age of 18, 9.50% from 18 to 24, 33.00% from 25 to 44, 21.50% from 45 to 64, and 8.00% who were 65 years of age or older. The median age was 33 years. For every 100 females, there were 99.90 males. For every 100 females age 18 and over, there were 97.50 males.

The median income for a household in the county was $36,996, and the median income for a family was $42,155. Males had a median income of $29,812 versus $23,035 for females. The per capita income for the county was $16,230. About 9.20% of families and 12.70% of the population were below the poverty line, including 15.90% of those under age 18 and 19.40% of those age 65 or over.

== Attractions ==
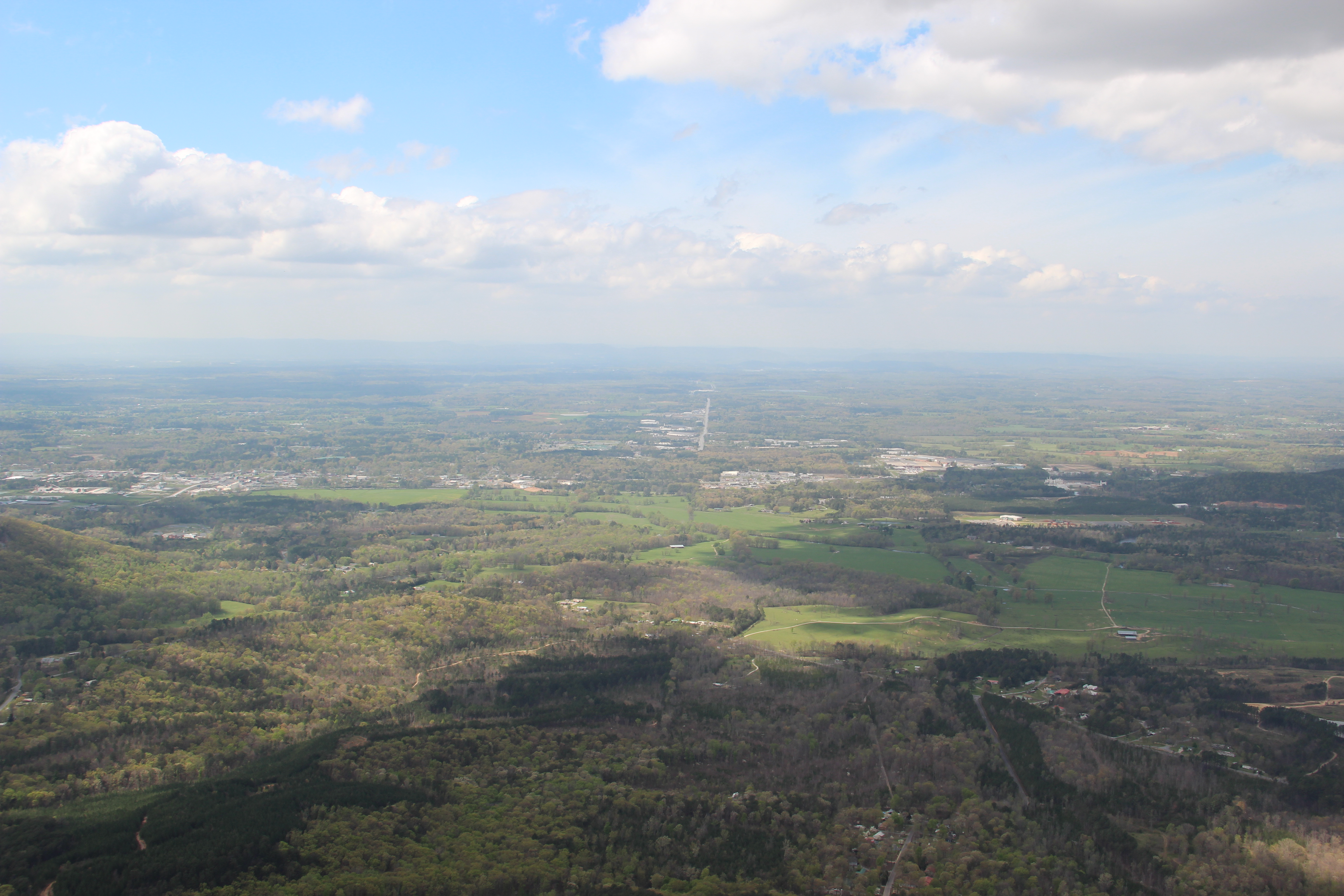
View of Murray County from Fort Mountain State Park

The Chief Vann House Historic Site at Spring Place. Constructed in 1805 for James Vann, a Cherokee chief, the two-story red brick home was built alongside the Federal Road, a major early path in northwest Georgia.

Fort Mountain State Park is a 3,712-acre (15 km^{2}) park in the Cohutta Mountains.

Another major asset is the Chattahoochee National Forest, which occupies a large portion of northeastern Murray County. Within the forest is the Cohutta Wilderness Area, a roadless, mountainous landscape featuring several of Georgia's premier backpacking trails.

Carters Lake, on the Coosawatee River, was formed by the Carter Dam, which is the largest earth-rock dam east of the Mississippi. The 3,200-acre (13 km^{2}) lake attracts fishermen, boaters and campers.

Lake Conasauga, near the summit of Grassy Mountain, was built by the Civilian Conservation Corps in 1940 and is the highest lake in Georgia at 3,150 feet (960 m) above sea level.

== Communities ==
=== Cities ===
- Chatsworth (county seat)

=== Towns ===
- Eton

=== Unincorporated communities ===
- Spring Place
- Carters
- Tennga
- Cisco

The community is located at the intersection of U.S. Route 411, Georgia State Route 2, and Georgia State Route 61, 13 miles (21 km) north of Chatsworth. Cisco has a post office with ZIP code 30708. A post office called Cisco has been in operation since 1881. The community's name is a shortening and alteration of the name of "Cis" Cockburn, a local storekeeper.

- Crandall (incorporated until 1995)

The community is located along the concurrent U.S. Route 411, Georgia State Route 2, and Georgia State Route 61, 7 miles (11 km) north of Chatsworth. Crandall has a post office with ZIP code 30711.

- Amzi/Treadwell Community
- Dennis

A post office called Dennis was established in 1882, and remained in operation until 1906. The community was named after Dennis Johnson, a local merchant.

- Hasslers Mill

A post office was established at Hasslers Mill in 1836, and remained in operation until 1909. The community was named after one William Hassler. Variant names are "Hasler Mill" and "Hassler Mill".

- Holley

A variant spelling was "Holly". A post office called Holly Creek was established in 1843, the name was changed to Holly in 1894, and the post office closed in 1909. The community derives its name from nearby Holly Creek.

- Ramhurst

Ramhurst of U.S. Route 411 and U.S. Route 76, 5.2 miles (8.4 km) south-southeast of Chatsworth. Ramhurst was first called "Ramsey", after A. K. Ramsey, the proprietor of a local gristmill and country store.

- Sumac

The community takes its name from nearby Sumac Creek. A variant spelling is "Sumach". A post office called Sumach was established in 1878, and remained in operation until 1907. The town was hit by a tornado on April 12, 2020, which killed eight people in and around the town and was rated EF2.

== Media ==
Murray County, Georgia was featured in an Independent Lens series documenting bullying.

== Politics ==
As of the 2020s, Murray County is a strongly Republican voting county, voting 86% for Donald Trump in 2024. For elections to the United States House of Representatives, Murray County is part of Georgia's 14th congressional district, currently represented by Clay Fuller. For elections to the Georgia State Senate, Murray County is part of District 54. For elections to the Georgia House of Representatives, Murray County is part of District 6.

United States presidential election results for Murray County, Georgia
Year	Republican		Democratic		Third party(ies)	
Year	No.	%	No.	%	No.	%
1912	68	9.18%	366	49.39%	307	41.43%
1916	301	18.82%	1,162	72.67%	136	8.51%
1920	851	53.89%	728	46.11%	0	0.00%
1924	648	42.33%	818	53.43%	65	4.25%
1928	1,106	52.97%	982	47.03%	0	0.00%
1932	350	15.67%	1,874	83.92%	9	0.40%
1936	806	33.53%	1,597	66.43%	1	0.04%
1940	545	28.01%	1,399	71.89%	2	0.10%
1944	671	32.80%	1,375	67.20%	0	0.00%
1948	616	25.41%	1,653	68.19%	155	6.39%
1952	756	29.12%	1,840	70.88%	0	0.00%
1956	1,144	38.61%	1,819	61.39%	0	0.00%
1960	925	33.02%	1,876	66.98%	0	0.00%
1964	1,064	30.44%	2,426	69.41%	5	0.14%
1968	1,278	33.23%	818	21.27%	1,750	45.50%
1972	2,643	80.41%	644	19.59%	0	0.00%
1976	889	20.20%	3,511	79.80%	0	0.00%
1980	1,538	32.72%	3,094	65.82%	69	1.47%
1984	3,521	68.10%	1,649	31.90%	0	0.00%
1988	3,996	70.11%	1,679	29.46%	25	0.44%
1992	3,256	45.13%	2,764	38.31%	1,194	16.55%
1996	3,289	46.17%	2,861	40.16%	974	13.67%
2000	5,539	66.16%	2,684	32.06%	149	1.78%
2004	7,745	72.38%	2,899	27.09%	56	0.52%
2008	8,180	71.46%	3,026	26.43%	241	2.11%
2012	8,443	75.02%	2,542	22.59%	270	2.40%
2016	10,341	82.67%	1,800	14.39%	368	2.94%
2020	12,944	84.08%	2,301	14.95%	150	0.97%
2024	14,965	85.67%	2,459	14.08%	44	0.25%

United States Senate election results for Murray County, Georgia2
Year	Republican		Democratic		Third party(ies)	
Year	No.	%	No.	%	No.	%
2020	12,493	83.16%	2,296	15.28%	234	1.56%
2020	10,963	84.34%	2,036	15.66%	0	0.00%

United States Senate election results for Murray County, Georgia3
Year	Republican		Democratic		Third party(ies)	
Year	No.	%	No.	%	No.	%
2020	6,300	42.50%	765	5.16%	7,758	52.34%
2020	10,966	84.39%	2,028	15.61%	0	0.00%
2022	9,737	84.90%	1,533	13.37%	199	1.74%
2022	8,893	86.91%	1,339	13.09%	0	0.00%

Georgia Gubernatorial election results for Murray County
Year	Republican		Democratic		Third party(ies)	
Year	No.	%	No.	%	No.	%
2022	10,290	89.22%	1,160	10.06%	83	0.72%

== Education ==
Public education is provided by the Murray County School District.

== See also ==
- National Register of Historic Places listings in Murray County, Georgia
- List of counties in Georgia
