= Cohutta Mountains =

Mountain range in Georgia, U.S.

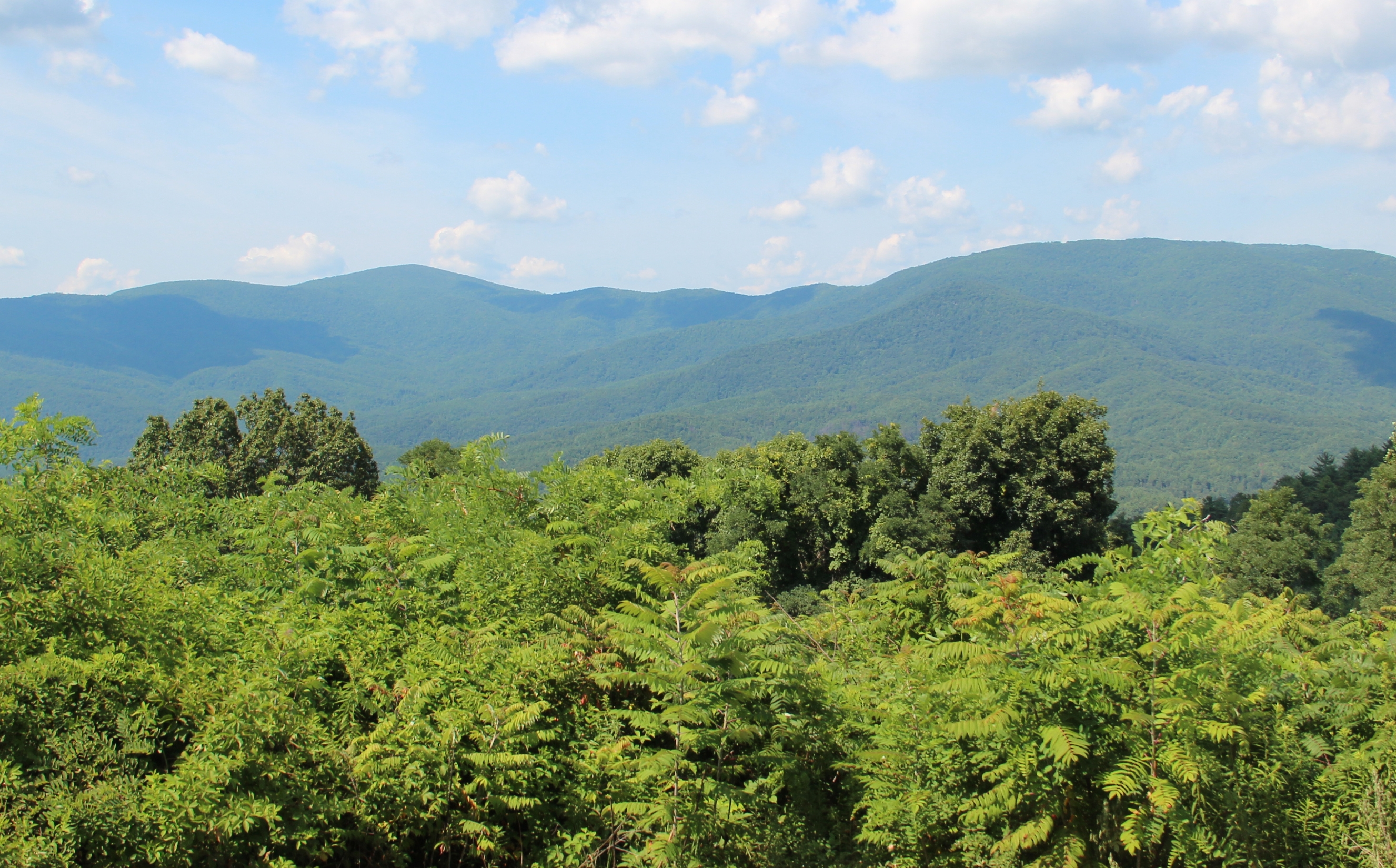
View of the Cohutta Mountains

The Cohutta Mountains is a mountain range in Georgia, U.S.

Cohutta is a name derived from the Cherokee language meaning "a shed roof supported on poles".

The range includes:

- Big Frog Mountain
- Fort Mountain (Murray County, Georgia)
- Grassy Mountain (Georgia), in Murray County near Lake Conasauga (34.862834°N 84.671888°W)

== See also ==
- Cohutta Wilderness
