= Conasauga River =

River in Tennessee and Georgia

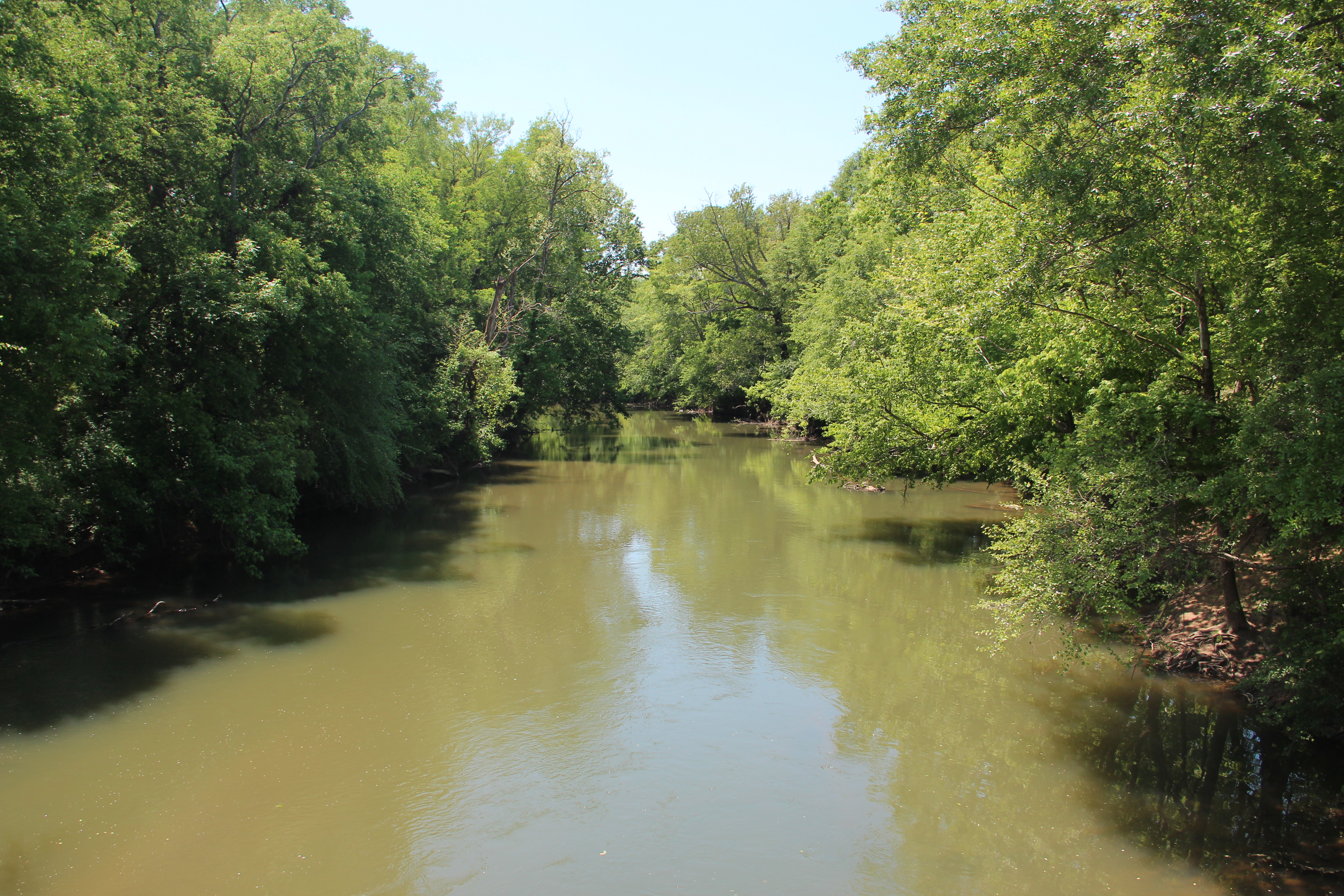
- View of the Conasauga River

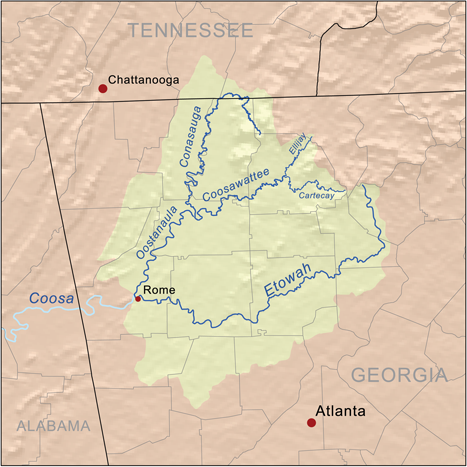

Physical characteristics
- Source: Cohutta Mountains
  - coordinates: 34°51′57″N 84°35′32″W
  - elevation: ~ 2,400 feet (730 m)
- Mouth: Oostanaula River
  - location: Calhoun, GA
  - coordinates: 34°32′37″N 84°54′10″W
  - elevation: ~ 620 feet (190 m)
- Length: 93 miles (150 km)
- Basin size: 772 sq mi (2,000 km^{2})

The Conasauga River is a river that runs through southeast Tennessee and northwest Georgia. The Conasauga River is 93 miles (150 km) long and drains into the Oostanaula River, a tributary of the Coosa River and part of the watershed of the Gulf of Mexico. The river is home to over 90 species of fish and 25 surviving species of freshwater mussels. Its watershed encompasses over 500,000 acres (2,000 km^{2}) in two states, multiple counties, and two ecologically different regions.

== Location ==
The Conasauga River is the most westerly trout water on public land in Georgia. It is the only river in Tennessee that is not a part of the Mississippi River watershed.

The only road access to the Conasauga is found via Old GA 2, GA 2, and Carlton Petty Road. Access via foot trail is located on Forest Service road (FS) 64 in Betty Gap. Three other trails descend from the west off FS 17 to intersect the river trail. From south to north they are the Chestnut Lead, 2.0 miles (3.2 km), Tearbritches Trail, 4.0 miles (6.4 km), and Hickory Creek Trail, 3.0 miles (4.8 km). Primitive camping is allowed all along the river.

== Natural information ==
At the core of the Conasauga watershed is the 35,268-acre (142.72 km^{2}) Cohutta Wilderness, located in Fannin, Gilmer, and Murray counties in Georgia and Polk County in Tennessee. The United States Forest Service manages the area as part of the Chattahoochee National Forest and Cherokee National Forest. The preserve covers over 95,000 acres (380 km^{2}) and contains approximately 15 miles (24 km) of the Conasauga.

The Conasauga River is home to more than 90 fish species, including 10 federally listed species of fish and mussels. Among these is the endemic, endangered Conasauga logperch (Percina jenkinsi). Historically there were 42 species of freshwater mussels, however only 25 species still exist. It is estimated that only 1% of original population remains. The waters yield established populations of rainbow trout and brown trout, with rainbows up to 20 inches (510 mm) and browns to 9 pounds (4.1 kg). The managed land is populated by white-tailed deer, wild hogs, black bears, and smaller animals.

== Environmental problems ==
The Conasauga River is a Category 1 priority watershed in Georgia's Unified Watershed Assessment and 18 miles (29 km) of the river and 54 miles (87 km) of the tributaries have been on Georgia's List of Impaired Waters for fecal, metal, toxic chemical, sediment, and nutrients.

Up to one-third of the summer flow taken in the vicinity of Dalton, Georgia is used for carpet production. The river has been contaminated with perfluorinated compounds used to make carpets stain-resistant, polluting the drinking water of downstream communities.

== Name ==
"Conasauga" is a name derived from the Cherokee language meaning "grass". According to the Geographic Names Information System, Conasauga River has also been known historically as:

- Connasauga River
- Connesauga River
- Conne-san-ga River
- Slave River
- Jacks River now is the name of a tributary of the Conasauga.

== Tributaries ==
- Tearbritches Creek

== See also ==
- Laurel Fork Railway
- List of rivers of Tennessee
