= Georgia State Route 201 =

State highway in Georgia

State Route 201
- SR 201 highlighted in red

Route information
- Maintained by GDOT
- Length: 20.9 mi (33.6 km)
- Existed: 1941–present

Major junctions
- South end: SR 136 in Villanow
- US 41 / US 76 / SR 3 from northwest of Rocky Face–Tunnel Hill; I-75 northeast of Tunnel Hill
- North end: SR 2 in Varnell

Location
- Country: United States
- State: Georgia
- Counties: Walker, Whitfield

Highway system
- Georgia State Highway System; Interstate; US; State; Special
← SR 200	→ SR 202

State Route 201 (SR 201) is a 20.9-mile-long (33.6 km) state highway in the northwestern part of the U.S. state of Georgia. It travels from Villanow, in Walker County northeast to Varnell, in Whitfield County.

== Route description ==
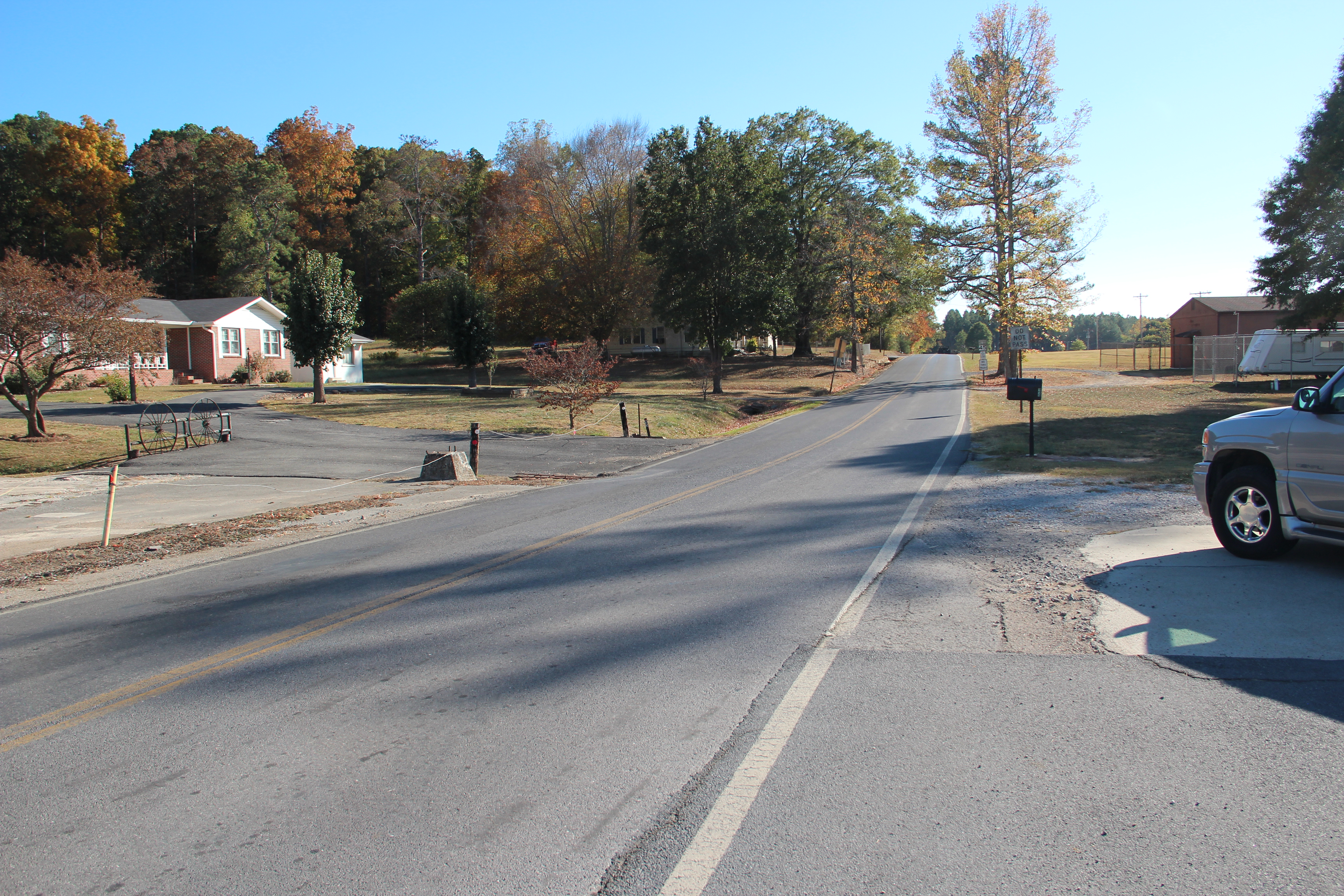
SR 201 in Villanow, Georgia

SR 201 begins at an intersection with SR 136 in Villanow. It heads north-northeast, through portions of the Chattahoochee-Oconee National Forest, until it enters Whitfield County. The highway continues to the north-northeast, and travels through the unincorporated community of Mt. Vernon. Shortly afterward, SR 201 travels past the western edge of Rocky Face. There, it intersects US 41/US 76/SR 3 (Chattanooga Road), and the four highways travel concurrently north to Tunnel Hill, where SR 201 departs to the northeast, while US 41/US 76/SR 3 continue on Chattanooga Road. Just past the northeastern edge of Tunnel Hill is an interchange with Interstate 75 (I-75; Larry McDonald Memorial Highway). SR 201 continues heading northeast until it meets its northern terminus, an intersection with SR 2 in Varnell.

SR 201 is not part of the National Highway System, a system of roadways important to the nation's economy, defense, and mobility.

== History ==
The roadway that would eventually become SR 201 was established between 1926 and the end of 1929 as part of SR 2, but on a slightly different path, from Villanow to Dalton. The next year, this segment's northern end was shifted to the northwest to travel from Villanow to US 41/SR 3 in Tunnel Hill. Its southern part was under construction. By the end of 1931, the southern part had completed grading, but no surface course, while the northern part was under construction. In February 1932, the southern end was shifted slightly to the west. In July of the next year, this entire segment of SR 2 had a "sand clay or top soil" surface. Around the middle of 1934, the entire segment had a "completed semi hard surface". At the beginning of 1940, SR 158 was established from US 41/SR 3 in Tunnel Hill to SR 71 in Varnell. Later that year, the Whitfield County portion of the Villanow–Tunnel Hill segment of SR 2 had a "completed hard surface". At the end of 1941, the entire length of SR 158 was redesignated as part of SR 201. By the end of 1946, SR 2 in Tunnel Hill was shifted back to Dalton, with the entire segment from Villanow to Dalton hard surfaced. By the beginning of 1948, all of SR 201 at the time, except for its northern terminus, had a "sand clay, top soil, or stabilized earth" surface. Its northern terminus was hard surfaced. The next year, SR 2 was shifted north. Its segment northeast of Villanow was redesignated as a southern extension of SR 201. The highway's northern segment was replaced by SR 2's new routing, thereby truncating it to the western part of Varnell. In 1953, the segment from Tunnel Hill–Varnell was hard surfaced.

== Major junctions ==
County	Location	mi	km	Destinations	Notes
Walker	Villanow	0.0	0.0	SR 136 – LaFayette, Calhoun	Southern terminus; formerly SR 2 and then SR 143
Whitfield		11.3	18.2	US 41 south / US 76 east / SR 3 south (Chattanooga Road)	Southern end of US 41/US 76/SR 3 concurrency
Whitfield	Tunnel Hill	14.0	22.5	US 41 north / US 76 west / SR 3 north (Chattanooga Road) – Ringgold	Northern end of US 41/US 76/SR 3 concurrency
Whitfield		16.2	26.1	I-75 (Larry McDonald Memorial Highway / SR 401) – Atlanta, Chattanooga	I-75 exit 341
Whitfield	Varnell	20.9	33.6	SR 2 (South Spring Street/Prater Mill Road NE)	Northern terminus
1.000 mi = 1.609 km; 1.000 km = 0.621 mi: Concurrency terminus
