= Northwest Whitfield High School =

Public high school in Whitfield County, Georgia, United States

Location
- 1651 Tunnel Hill-Varnell Rd; Tunnel Hill, Georgia 30755; United States; 34°52′38″N 84°59′50″W

Information
- School type: Public, high school
- Established: 1975
- School board: Whitfield County School District
- Superintendent: Judy Gilreath
- Principal: Mandie Jones
- Principal: Jennifer Eller
- Principal: Laurie Grant
- Principal: Rodney Shields
- Staff: 73.30 (FTE)
- Grades: 9-12
- Enrollment: 1,130 (2023-2024)
- Student to teacher ratio: 15.42
- Language: English
- Colors: Blue and orange
- Mascot: Bruin
- Website: https://nhs.wcsga.net/

Northwest Whitfield High School or Northwest High School (NHS) is a public high school located in unincorporated Whitfield County, Georgia, United States. It has a Tunnel Hill postal address and is adjacent to, but not within, the city limits of Varnell. It is a part of the Whitfield County School District. The school colors are royal blue and burnt orange, and the mascot is the Bruin. The school is classified as Class AAAA by the Georgia High School Association (GHSA).

A middle school that feeds into Northwest Whitfield High School is New Hope middle and Westside Middle New Hope middle Is New Hope Middle School New Hope Middle School is a public middle school located in Whitfield County, Georgia, United States. The school serves students in grades 6 through 8 and operates as a Title I school, receiving federal funding to support academic achievement for all students. Overview New Hope Middle School focuses on academic growth, leadership development, and student involvement through athletics and career-based programs. The school mascot is the Kodiak, representing strength, resilience, and school pride. Academics Core academic subjects include: English Language Arts (ELA) Mathematics Science Social Studies Electives include Art and Physical Education (PE). The school also offers agricultural education as part of its Career and Technical Education programs. Career and Technical Education New Hope Middle School has an active Future Farmers of America (FFA) chapter and agricultural (Ag) program. Students participate in leadership conferences, competitions, and hands-on agricultural learning experiences. Athletics The school offers a variety of athletic programs for students in grades 6–8: Cross Country (XC) Track and Field Volleyball Soccer Football Archery Administration Principal: Rodney O'Neal Shields Vice Principal: Beth Yuck 7th Grade Faculty The 7th grade teaching team includes: Mathematics: Stephen Robinette and Amber Dover English Language Arts (ELA): Darlene Morgan Science: Justin Holofeild Social Studies: Justin Holofeild Feeder Pattern Upon completion of 8th grade, students from New Hope Middle School typically attend Northwest Whitfield High School. Community and Support As a Title I school, New Hope Middle School receives federal funding to provide additional academic support and resources to students. Faculty and staff work to maintain a safe and engaging learning environment.

== History ==
Northwest Whitfield High School opened in the fall of 1975. It was created by a merger of North Whitfield High School and Westside High School. Southeast Whitfield High School was also opened in fall of 1975 as the Whitfield County School District merged its four high schools into two.

Businessman and later 45th President Donald Trump attended the 1991 homecoming football game.

== Academics ==
Students can take college prep, honors, and Advanced Placement classes.

== Feeder schools ==
Two middle schools feed into Northwest Whitfield High School: New Hope Middle School and Westside Middle School. Before the opening of Coahulla Creek, North Whitfield Middle was also one of Northwest Whitfield's feeder schools. The recently built Coahulla Creek High School's feeder school is now North Whitfield Middle School.

== Athletics ==
Northwest Whitfield fields 20 varsity-level teams (10 men's and 10 women's), and competes in Region 7AAAA.

Northwest Whitfield traditionally has three rivals: Southeast Whitfield High School, Dalton High School, and Murray County High School, and more recently newer Whitfield County school Coahulla Creek High School.

Men's sports:

- Archery
- Baseball
- Basketball
- Cross country
- Football
- Golf
- Soccer
- Swimming
- Tennis
- Track and field
- Wrestling
- Marching Band (If you play and Instrument or you could be a runner)
- Co-Ed: One Act Play & Literary Team

Women's sports:

- Archery
- Basketball
- Competition cheerleading
- Cross country
- Golf
- Soccer
- Swimming
- Tennis
- Track and field
- Volleyball
- Marching Band (If you play and Instrument or you could be a runner)
- Color guard
- Co-Ed: One Act Play & Literary Team

State Champions

  - Soccer: 2018 AAAA State Champions
  - Baseball: 1982 AAA State Champions
  - Softball:
    - 1987 AAA State Champions
    - 1993 AAA State Champions
    - 2012 AAAA State Champions
    - 2013 AAAA State Champions
  - Track and field:
    - 2006 and 2008 men's pole vault - Nate Woodason
    - 2009 men's pole vault - Jake Bridges
    - 2009 men's 1600 meters - AJ Meyer
    - 2009 women's 400 and 800 meters - Morgan Williams
  - Women's golf: 2009 AAAA State Champions
  - Literary Team:
    - State Champions Duo Interpretation 2019 & 2021
- State Runners-up
  - Men's Soccer: 2025 AAA State Runner-Up
  - Women's basketball: 1990 AAA State Runner-Up, 2010 AAAA State Runner-Up
  - One Act Play:
    - 2019 & 2021 AAAA State Runners-Up
- State runs
  - Men's soccer: 2012 Elite 8 (placed 8th in the state), 2013 Semi-Final (placed 3rd in the state playoffs.)
  - One Act Play:
    - 2022 & 2023 AAAA 3rd In State

== Fine arts ==
Fine arts at Northwest consist of choral, band, art, and drama departments.

- The Band Department has the Sound of the Blazing Blue, Wind Ensemble, Jazz Band, and Concert Band, the largest being the Sound of the Blazing Blue with 200 members.
- The Choral Department is Ladies of Northwest Ensemble, Northwest Singers, Ladies Trio and Men's Quartet (the last two groups compete as part of the GHSA Literary Meet).
- The Drama Department consists of One-Act play, Improv Comedy Team, Fine Arts Ambassador Program serving area feeder schools, Summer Programs, class plays, and a large spring musical.

The 2007 Sound of the Blazing Blue

== Notable alumni ==
- Bayli Cruse (2014), softball player
- Isaiah Mack (2014), football player
- Marla Maples (1981), actress and television personality
- Steve Prohm (1992), basketball coach
