= Whitfield County School District =

School district in Georgia (U.S. state)

Whitfield County Schools

Address
- 3264 Cleveland Highway Dalton, Georgia, 30721; United States
- Coordinates: 34.761261°N 84.971278°W

District information
- Grades: Pre-kindergarten – 12
- Superintendent: Mike Ewton
- Accreditations: Southern Association of Colleges and Schools; Georgia Accrediting Commission

Students and staff
- Enrollment: 12,317 (2022–23)
- Faculty: 918.80 (FTE)
- Staff: 756.40 (FTE)
- Student–teacher ratio: 13.41

Other information
- Telephone: (706) 217-6780
- Website: wcsga.net

The Whitfield County School District is a public school district in Whitfield County, Georgia, United States, based in an unincorporated area with a Dalton postal address. It serves areas of Whitfield County outside of the Dalton city limits, including the communities of Cohutta, Tunnel Hill, and Varnell. Dalton residents are zoned to Dalton Public Schools.

A little about a whitfield co schools New Hope Middle School New Hope Middle School is a public middle school located in Whitfield County, Georgia, United States. The school serves students in grades 6 through 8 and operates as a Title I school, receiving federal funding to support academic achievement for all students. Overview New Hope Middle School focuses on academic growth, leadership development, and student involvement through athletics and career-based programs. The school mascot is the Kodiak, representing strength, resilience, and school pride. Academics Core academic subjects include: English Language Arts (ELA) Mathematics Science Social Studies Electives include Art and Physical Education (PE). The school also offers agricultural education as part of its Career and Technical Education programs. Career and Technical Education New Hope Middle School has an active Future Farmers of America (FFA) chapter and agricultural (Ag) program. Students participate in leadership conferences, competitions, and hands-on agricultural learning experiences. Athletics The school offers a variety of athletic programs for students in grades 6–8: Cross Country (XC) Track and Field Volleyball Soccer Football Archery Administration Principal: Rodney O'Neal Shields Vice Principal: Beth Yuck 7th Grade Faculty The 7th grade teaching team includes: Mathematics: Stephen Robinette and Amber Dover English Language Arts (ELA): Darlene Morgan Science: Justin Holofeild Social Studies: Justin Holofeild Feeder Pattern Upon completion of 8th grade, students from New Hope Middle School typically attend Northwest Whitfield High School. Community and Support As a Title I school, New Hope Middle School receives federal funding to provide additional academic support and resources to students. Faculty and staff work to maintain a safe and engaging learning environment.

== History ==
Judy Gilreath became the superintendent in 2013.

== Schools ==
The Whitfield County School District has thirteen elementary schools, five middle schools, four high schools, and one charter school.

=== High schools ===
- Coahulla Creek High School
- Northwest Whitfield County High School
- Phoenix High School
- Southeast Whitfield County High School
- Alternative School - Crossroads Academy

=== Middle schools ===
- Eastbrook Middle School
- New Hope Middle School
- North Whitfield Middle School
- Valley Point Middle School
- Westside Middle School

=== Elementary schools ===
- Antioch Elementary School
- Beaverdale Elementary School
- Cedar Ridge Elementary School
- Cohutta Elementary School
- Dawnville Elementary School
- Dug Gap Elementary School
- Eastside Elementary School
- New Hope Elementary School
- Pleasant Grove Elementary School
- Tunnel Hill Elementary School
- Valley Point Elementary School
- Varnell Elementary School
- Westside Elementary School

=== Charter school ===
- Whitfield County Career Academy

== Other facilities ==
The administration building is outside of the Dalton city limits. The Student Services & Enrollment Building is within the Dalton city limits. The operations facility is not in the Dalton city limits.
