= Bayli Cruse =

American softball player

Personal information
- Nationality: American
- Born: November 18, 1995 (age 30) Cohutta, Georgia
- Height: 5 ft 6 in (1.68 m)

Sport
- Country: USA
- Sport: Softball
- College team: Tennessee Tech Golden Eagles

Bayli Mane Lyn Cruse (born November 18, 1995) is an American softball player. She attended Northwest Whitfield High School in Whitfield County, Georgia. She later attended Tennessee Technological University, where she played catcher on the Tennessee Tech Golden Eagles softball team. During her freshman year at Tennessee Tech, Cruse was named All-OVC Newcomer while leading the Golden Eagles to an Ohio Valley Conference championship and a berth in the 2015 NCAA Division I softball tournament.
