= Isaiah Mack =

American football player (born 1996)

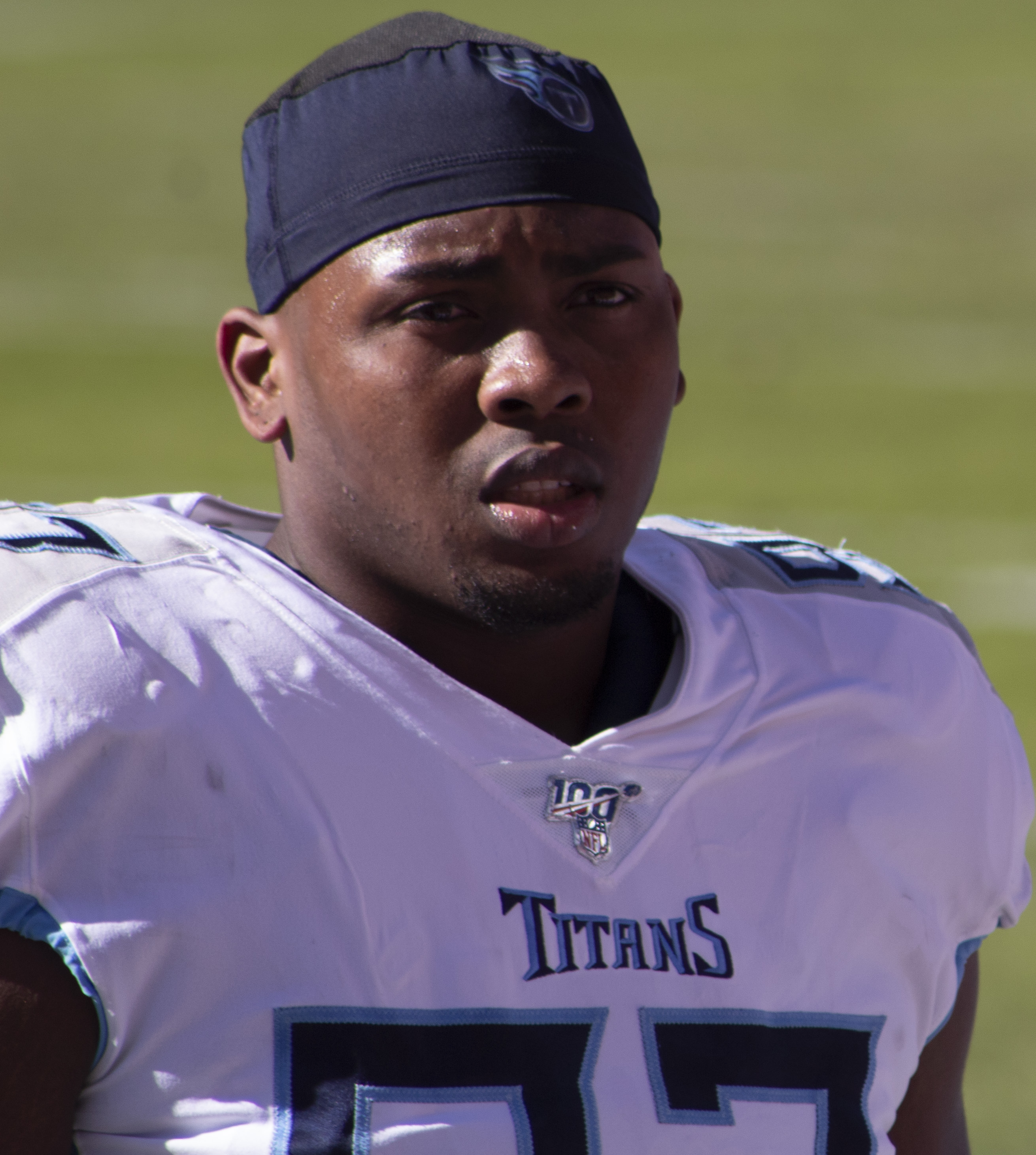
- Mack with the Tennessee Titans in 2019

Ottawa Redblacks
- Position: Defensive end
- Roster status: Practice roster
- CFL status: American

Personal information
- Born: March 19, 1996 (age 30); Tunnel Hill, Georgia, U.S.
- Listed height: 6 ft 1 in (1.85 m)
- Listed weight: 318 lb (144 kg)

Career information
- High school: Northwest Whitfield
- College: Chattanooga
- NFL draft: 2019: undrafted

Career history
- Tennessee Titans (2019–2020); New England Patriots (2020); Denver Broncos (2021)*; Pittsburgh Steelers (2021)*; Baltimore Ravens (2021–2022); Seattle Seahawks (2022); New York Jets (2022); Washington Commanders (2023)*; Miami Dolphins (2024)*; St. Louis Battlehawks (2025); Orlando Storm (2026); Ottawa Redblacks (2026–present)*
- * Offseason or practice squad member only

Awards and highlights
- SoCon Defensive Player of the Year (2018); First-team All-SoCon (2018); Second-team All-SoCon (2017)

Career NFL statistics as of 2023
- Total tackles: 17
- Sacks: 2.5
- Fumble recoveries: 1
- Stats at Pro Football Reference

Isaiah Dwight Mack (born March 19, 1996) is an American professional football defensive end for the Ottawa Redblacks of the Canadian Football League (CFL). He played college football at Chattanooga, and signed as an undrafted free agent with the Tennessee Titans in 2018.

== Early life ==
Mack was born and grew up in Tunnel Hill, Georgia. He attended Northwest Whitfield High School, where he played football and competed in wrestling. As a junior, Mack made 137 tackles (30 for loss) and eight sacks, highlighted by a 30-tackle performance against Gilmer High School that included nine tackles for loss, and was named first-team All-Region 7-AAAA and the regional defensive player of the year. As a senior, he repeated as first-team all-region and the defensive player of the year after tallying 121 tackles, 21 for loss, and 29 quarterback pressures with four forced fumbles. He committed to play college football at the University of Tennessee at Chattanooga over offers from Georgia Southern, Appalachian State, Eastern Kentucky, Georgia State, Coastal Carolina and Kennesaw State.

== College career ==
Mack was a member of the Chattanooga Mocs football team for five seasons, redshirting his freshman year. He became a starter on the Mocs defensive line in his redshirt freshman season, making 54 tackles, nine for a loss, 3.5 sacks and a forced fumble and was named to the Southern Conference (SoCon) All-Freshman team. As a redshirt sophomore, Mack made 36 tackles and finished fourth in the conference in both tackles for loss (14) and sacks (7.5). He was named second-team All-SoCon as a redshirt junior after recording 54 tackles, seven for a loss, and 1.5 sacks. Mack was named a first-team All-American by the Associated Press, first-team All-SoCon and the SoCon Defensive Player of the Year as a redshirt senior after tallying 78 tackles (11 for loss), 8.5 sacks, two passes defensed, two forced fumbles, and one fumble recovery.

== Professional career ==
Pre-draft measurables
Height	Weight	Arm length	Hand span	Wingspan	40-yard dash	10-yard split	20-yard split	20-yard shuttle	Three-cone drill	Vertical jump	Broad jump	Bench press
6 ft 1 1/4 in (1.86 m)	299 lb (136 kg)	31 3/4 in (0.81 m)	9 5/8 in (0.24 m)	6 ft 4 7/8 in (1.95 m)	4.99 s	1.68 s	2.90 s	4.67 s	7.50 s	32.5 in (0.83 m)	9 ft 1 in (2.77 m)	25 reps
All values from Pro Day

=== Tennessee Titans ===
Mack signed as an undrafted free agent with the Tennessee Titans on April 28, 2019 and made the team out of training camp. Mack made his NFL debut in the season opener against the Cleveland Browns, recording one tackle in the 43-13 road victory. In the next game against the Indianapolis Colts, he recorded his first NFL sack after bringing down quarterback Jacoby Brissett in a narrow 19-17 loss. During Week 8 against the Tampa Bay Buccaneers, Mack recovered a fumble lost by Jameis Winston in the 27-23 win.

Mack finished his rookie year with eight tackles, a fumble recovery, and 1.5 sacks.

On November 2, 2020, Mack was waived by the Titans.

=== New England Patriots ===
On November 3, 2020, Mack was claimed off waivers by the New England Patriots. He was waived on December 19, 2020, and re-signed to the practice squad four days later. He was placed on the practice squad/COVID-19 by the team on December 25, 2020, and restored to the practice squad on January 4, 2021. His practice squad contract with the team expired after the season on January 11, 2021.

=== Denver Broncos ===
On February 11, 2021, the Denver Broncos signed Mack. He was waived on August 31, 2021.

=== Pittsburgh Steelers ===
On October 12, 2021, Mack was signed to the Pittsburgh Steelers practice squad. He was released on November 15, 2021.

=== Baltimore Ravens ===
On November 17, 2021, Mack was signed to the Baltimore Ravens practice squad. He signed a reserve/future contract with the Ravens on January 13, 2022.

On August 30, 2022, Mack was waived by the Ravens and signed to the practice squad the next day. He was promoted to the active roster on December 23. He was waived on December 26.

=== Seattle Seahawks ===
On December 27, 2022, Mack was claimed off waivers by the Seattle Seahawks. He was waived on January 13, 2023.

=== New York Jets ===
On January 16, 2023, Mack was claimed off waivers by the New York Jets, but not officially added to their roster until after Super Bowl LVII. He was released on August 8, 2023.

=== Washington Commanders ===
On August 20, 2023, Mack signed with the Washington Commanders. Eight days later, he was released as part of final roster cuts before the start of 2023 season.

=== Miami Dolphins ===
On March 5, 2024, Mack signed with the Miami Dolphins. He was released on August 27.

=== St. Louis Battlehawks ===
On December 4, 2024, Mack signed with the St. Louis Battlehawks of the United Football League (UFL). He was placed on injured reserve on May 20, 2025.

=== Orlando Storm ===
On January 13, 2026, Mack was selected by the Orlando Storm in the 2026 UFL Draft.

=== Ottawa Redblacks ===
On September 7, 2026, Mack signed with the Ottawa Redblacks of the Canadian Football League to their practice roster. On September 24, he was released and re-signed two days later.

== NFL career statistics ==
Regular season statistics
Year	Team	Games		Tackles					Interceptions						Fumbles			
Year	Team	GP	GS	Comb	Solo	Ast	Sck	Sfty	PD	Int	Yds	Avg	Lng	TD	FF	FR	Yds	TD
2019	TEN	13	1	6	2	4	0.0	–	–	–	–	–	–	–	–	–	–	–
2020	NE	8	0	3	1	2	0.0	–	–	–	–	–	–	–	–	–	–	–
2021	BAL	2	0	2	1	1	1.0	–	–	–	–	–	–	–	–	–	–	–
Career		23	1	11	4	7	1.0	0	0	0	0	0.0	0	0	0	0	0	0

== Personal life ==
Mack is the son of Sequoyah Mack and has a younger brother Rashaun.
