= Southeast Whitfield High School =

Location
- 1954 Riverbend Road; Dalton postal address, Georgia 30721; United States; 34.7335°N 84.9395°W

Information
- Type: Public high school
- Established: 1975
- School district: Whitfield County School District
- NCES School ID: 130570001818
- Principal: Denise Pendley
- Teaching staff: 88.90 (FTE)
- Grades: 9–12
- Enrollment: 1,512 (2023-2024)
- Student to teacher ratio: 17.01
- Campus type: Suburban
- Colors: Maroon, silver, black, and white
- Mascot: Raider
- Website: www.wcsga.net/shs

Southeast Whitfield High School is a public high school in unincorporated Whitfield County, Georgia, United States, with a Dalton postal address. It is part of the Whitfield County School District and competes athletically in the 7-AAAA Division of the Georgia High School Association (GHSA).

== History ==
Southeast Whitfield County Comprehensive High School (SHS) was established in 1975, with students merging from rivals Valley Point and Eastbrook High Schools. However, the new building was not completed in time for the new school year. In 1975–76, students attended class at the former Eastbrook property, while vocational students were transported 10.5 miles to Northwest Whitfield High, which later transformed to North Whitfield Middle on Cleveland Highway. SHS' modern facility was completed in time for the 1976–77 school year (former county high schools became middle schools for grades 6–8). Since then, SHS has expanded to become one of the three major government high schools in the Dalton area, along with Northwest Whitfield High School and Phoenix High School.

== Athletics ==
Southeast Whitfield competes in several GHSA-sponsored athletics and activities, which include baseball, basketball, cheerleading, cross country, football, golf, one act, soccer, softball, swimming, tennis, track, and volleyball. The boys' soccer team (locally known as "Raider Rage") is the school's most successful athletic program, making the state playoffs every year since the mid-2000s. The program's three most successful seasons include 2007–08, winning GHSA AAAA runner-up against Lakeside after losing 3–1 in penalty kicks, 2012–13, winning GHSA AAAA runner-up against inter-county rival Dalton High School, and 2016–2017, winning the AAAA state title after defeating Druid Hills High School during overtime with a final score of 3–2.

== Notable alumni ==
- Sam Purcell (1999), college basketball coach for the Mississippi State Bulldogs
