= Kyric McGowan =

American football player (born 1999)

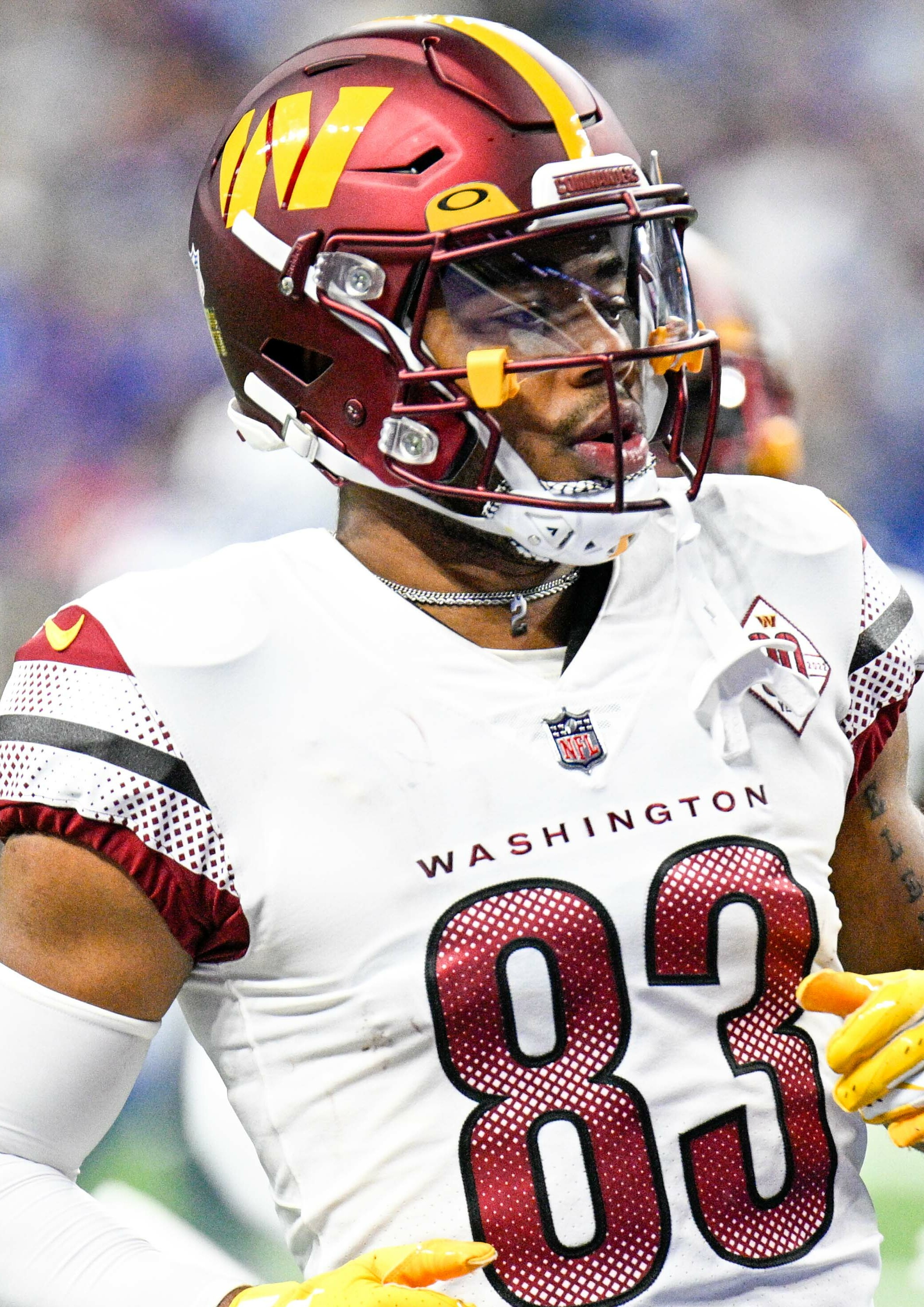
- McGowan with the Washington Commanders in 2022

No. 0 – Rhode Island Breakers
- Position: Wide receiver
- Roster status: Active

Personal information
- Born: November 1, 1999 (age 27); Dalton, Georgia, U.S.
- Listed height: 5 ft 11 in (1.80 m)
- Listed weight: 200 lb (91 kg)

Career information
- High school: Dalton (Dalton)
- College: Northwestern (2017–2020); Georgia Tech (2021)
- NFL draft: 2022: undrafted

Career history
- Washington Commanders (2022); Jacksonville Jaguars (2024)*; Miami Dolphins (2024)*; Montreal Alouettes (2025); Birmingham Stallions (2026); Rhode Island Breakers (2027–present)
- * Offseason or practice squad member only

Career NFL statistics as of 2023
- Games played: 2
- Stats at Pro Football Reference

Kyric McGowan (born September 1, 1999) is an American professional football wide receiver for the Rhode Island Breakers of the United Football League (UFL).. He played college football at Northwestern and Georgia Tech and was signed by the Washington Commanders as an undrafted free agent in 2022.

== Early life and college ==
McGowan was born on November 1, 1999, in Dalton, Georgia, where he grew up. He attended Dalton High School, where he played football, baseball, and track and field. As a senior in football, he was team captain and helped lead the team to the number one Georgia 6-A State ranking. He was an honorable mention all-state honoree and was first-team all-region and all-area.

A three-star recruit, McGowan committed to play college football at Northwestern. In 2017, he was one of 13 true freshmen to see regular season game action, appearing in 11 games and recording five receptions for 51 yards. As a sophomore in 2018, he recorded 16 catches for 283 yards and scored two touchdowns, while playing in all 13 games. As a junior, he was a starter in all nine games in which he appeared, and finished the year with 13 receptions for 102 yards, in addition to 177 rushing yards and one score. In 2020, he appeared in eight matches and made 34 receptions for 366 yards.

Near the end of the 2020 season, McGowan announced that he was going to transfer to Georgia Tech for a super senior season after all players were given an extra year of eligibility due to the COVID-19 pandemic. In his lone season at Georgia Tech, he played in 11 games, 10 as a starter, and tied for the team lead in receptions with 37, while placing third on the team with 467 yards and scoring seven touchdowns. His touchdown total led Georgia Tech and placed eighth in the conference. At the end of the year, he was named academic all-conference.

== Professional career ==
Pre-draft measurables
Height	Weight	Arm length	Hand span	Wingspan	40-yard dash	10-yard split	20-yard split	20-yard shuttle	Three-cone drill	Vertical jump	Broad jump	Bench press
5 ft 10 5/8 in (1.79 m)	200 lb (91 kg)	30 3/8 in (0.77 m)	9 in (0.23 m)	5 ft 11 5/8 in (1.82 m)	4.59 s	1.65 s	2.69 s	4.35 s	7.48 s	35.5 in (0.90 m)	10 ft 2 in (3.10 m)	21 reps
All values from Pro Day

=== Washington Commanders ===
McGowan signed with the Washington Commanders as an undrafted free agent in May 2022. He was waived on August 30, 2022, but re-signed to the practice squad the following day. He was activated from the practice squad for their game against the Green Bay Packers, appearing on 13 combined offensive and special team plays. He signed a reserve/future contract on January 9, 2023. On August 29, 2023, he was placed on injured reserve. He was released two days later.

=== Jacksonville Jaguars ===
On June 14, 2024, McGowan signed with the Jacksonville Jaguars. He was waived on June 20.

=== Miami Dolphins ===
On July 23, 2024, McGowan signed with the Miami Dolphins. He was waived on August 27.

=== Montreal Alouettes ===
McGowan was signed by the Montreal Alouettes on February 3, 2025. He was released on May 15.

=== Birmingham Stallions ===
On January 23, 2026, McGowan signed with the Birmingham Stallions of the United Football League (UFL). He was released on February 7. He was re-signed on May 12.
