= Dalton metropolitan area, Georgia =

Dalton Metropolitan Area Dalton Metropolitan Statistical Area
- Metropolitan Statistical Area
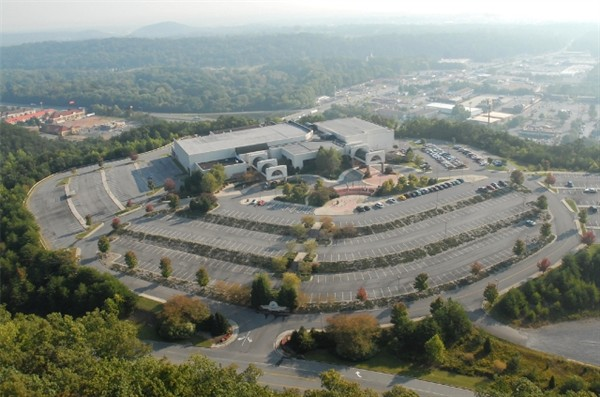
- Dalton Convention Center
Interactive Map of Dalton, GA MSA
City of Dalton
Dalton, GA MSA
Other Counties in the Chattanooga CSA
- Country: United States
- State: Georgia
- Largest city: Dalton
- Time zone: UTC−5 (EST)
  - Summer (DST): UTC−4 (EDT)

The Dalton Metropolitan Statistical Area, as defined by the United States Census Bureau, is an area consisting of two counties in northwestern Georgia, anchored by the city of Dalton. At the 2020 census, the MSA had a population of 142,837. The MSA is included in the Chattanooga–Cleveland–Dalton, TN–GA–AL Combined Statistical Area

== Counties ==
- Murray
- Whitfield

== Communities ==
- Carters (unincorporated)
- Chatsworth
- Cisco (unincorporated)
- Cohutta
- Crandall (unincorporated)
- Dalton (Principal city)
- Eton
- Rocky Face (unincorporated)
- Tilton (unincorporated)
- Tunnel Hill
- Varnell

== Demographics ==
At the 2000 census, there were 120,031 people, 42,671 households and 32,412 families residing within the MSA. The racial makeup of the MSA was 85.30% White, 2.87% African American, 0.33% Native American, 0.71% Asian, 0.03% Pacific Islander, 9.16% from other races, and 1.59% from two or more races. Hispanic or Latino of any race were 17.02% of the population.

The median household income was $38,187 and the median family income was $43,404. Males had a median income of $29,967 versus $23,372 for females. The per capita income for the MSA was $17,373.

== See also ==
- Georgia census statistical areas
