= Mill Creek, Georgia =

Mill Creek
- unincorporated community
- Location in Georgia
- Coordinates: 34°43′57″N 85°02′32″W
- Country: United States
- State: Georgia
- County: Whitfield
- Elevation: 830 ft (250 m)
- Time zone: UTC-5 (Eastern (EST))
  - Summer (DST): UTC-4 (EDT)
- ZIP code: 30710
- GNIS feature ID: 332388

Mill Creek is an unincorporated community in Whitfield County, in the U.S. state of Georgia.

== History ==
The community takes its name from a nearby creek of the same name.
