= Marian McCamy Sims =

American novelist

- Born: October 16, 1899; Dalton, Georgia
- Died: July 8, 1961 (aged 61); Charlotte, North Carolina
- Occupation: Writer (novelist)
- Spouse: Frank Knight Sims (m. 1927)
- Writing career
- Period: 20th century
- Genres: Fiction, romance

Marian McCamy Sims (October 16, 1899 – July 9, 1961) was an American writer of short stories and fiction.

== Biography ==
Sims was born in Dalton, Georgia in 1899. Her parents were Julian McCamy and Grace Gardner. She attended school at Agnes Scott College in Decatur, Georgia. After graduating in 1920 with a Bachelor of Arts degree, she taught history and French at Dalton High School. After four years of teaching, she became a copy writer for an advertising firm. In 1927 she married Frank Knight Sims and they moved first to Greensboro, North Carolina and then finally settling in Charlotte, North Carolina.

In 1931, she won a short story writing contest which began a twenty year career of writing. Sims published several short stories in magazines such as Ladies' Home Journal, Liberty, McCall's, and The Saturday Evening Post.

Her main body of work consisted of seven novels. Sims felt that too many of the novels written about the South were about "sharecroppers, Negroes, and backward-looking aristocrats." So she concentrated on writing novels concerning her own social stratum, that being the middle to upper class Southern culture. During World War II, her husband served as a naval officer and she focused on short stories for magazines. She said, "it could be written more or less on the run, while I was waiting instructions to set out for California--or heaven knows where." Many of these stories dealt with the theme of dislocation during the war.

In 1949, she wrote the lyrics for a religious work called Peace: A Sacred Cantata by Lamar Stringfield. She died of cancer in Charlotte in 1961.

== Works ==
- Morning Star, (1934)
- Fence, (1936)
- Call It Freedom, (1937)
- Memo to Timothy Sheldon, (1938)
- The City on the Hill, (1940)
- Beyond Surrender, (1942)
- Storm before Daybreak, (1946)
