= Varnell, Georgia =

- City
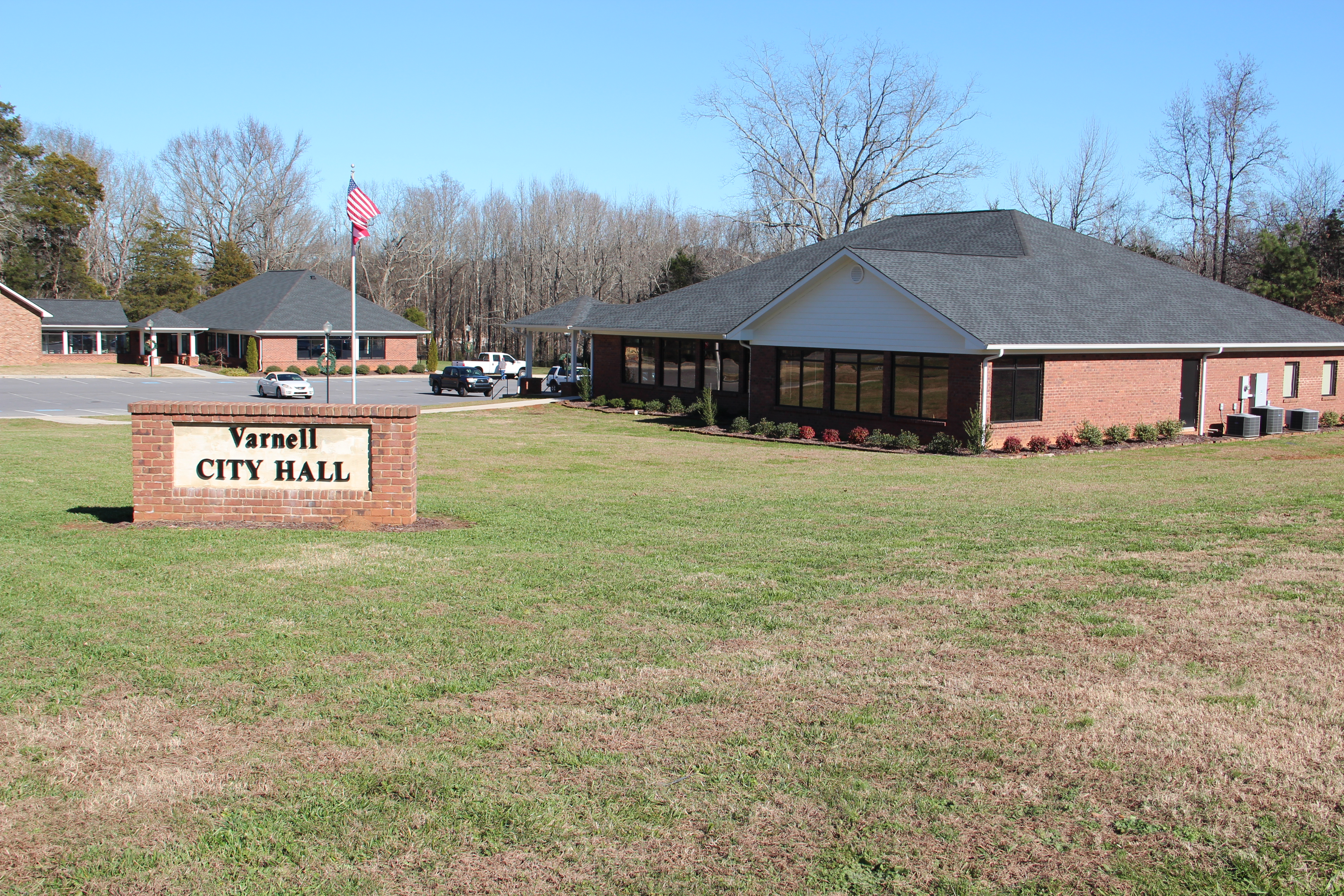
- Varnell City Hall

- Seal

- Location in Whitfield County and the state of Georgia
- Coordinates: 34°53′58″N 84°57′52″W
- Country: United States
- State: Georgia
- County: Whitfield

Government
  - Mayor: Tom Dickson

Area
  - Total: 3.83 sq mi (9.92 km^{2})
  - Land: 3.83 sq mi (9.92 km^{2})
  - Water: 0 sq mi (0.00 km^{2})
- Elevation: 807 ft (246 m)

Population (2020)
  - Total: 2,179
  - Density: 569.1/sq mi (219.75/km^{2})
- Time zone: UTC-5 (Eastern (EST))
  - Summer (DST): UTC-4 (EDT)
- ZIP code: 30756
- Area codes: 706/762
- FIPS code: 13-78996
- GNIS feature ID: 0356614
- Website: cityofvarnell.com

Varnell is a city in Whitfield County, Georgia, United States. It is part of the Dalton, Georgia Metropolitan Statistical Area. The population was 2,179 at the 2020 census.

== History ==
The Georgia General Assembly incorporated Varnell in 1968. The community was named after M.P. Varnell, a railroad official.

== Geography ==
Varnell is located at 34°53′58″N 84°57′52″W (34.899367, -84.964573).

According to the United States Census Bureau, the city has a total area of 2.5 square miles (6.5 km^{2}), all land.

== Demographics ==
Historical population
| Census | Pop. | Note | %± |
|---|---|---|---|
| 1880 | 99 | | — |
| 1970 | 314 | | — |
| 1980 | 282 | | −10.2% |
| 1990 | 358 | | 27.0% |
| 2000 | 1,491 | | 316.5% |
| 2010 | 1,744 | | 17.0% |
| 2020 | 2,179 | | 24.9% |
U.S. Decennial Census; 2010 2020

=== Racial and ethnic composition ===
Varnell city, Georgia - Demographic Profile (NH = Non-Hispanic)
| Race / Ethnicity | Pop 2010 | Pop 2020 | % 2010 | % 2020 |
|---|---|---|---|---|
| White alone (NH) | 1,304 | 1,592 | 74.77% | 73.06% |
| Black or African American alone (NH) | 70 | 51 | 4.01% | 2.34% |
| Native American or Alaska Native alone (NH) | 6 | 7 | 0.34% | 0.32% |
| Asian alone (NH) | 48 | 32 | 2.75% | 1.47% |
| Pacific Islander alone (NH) | 0 | 0 | 0.00% | 0.00% |
| Some Other Race alone (NH) | 5 | 6 | 0.29% | 0.28% |
| Mixed Race/Multi-Racial (NH) | 10 | 58 | 0.57% | 2.66% |
| Hispanic or Latino (any race) | 301 | 433 | 17.26% | 19.87% |
| Total | 1,744 | 2,179 | 100.00% | 100.00% |

Note: the US Census treats Hispanic/Latino as an ethnic category. This table excludes Latinos from the racial categories and assigns them to a separate category. Hispanics/Latinos can be of any race.

=== 2020 census ===
As of the 2020 census, Varnell had a population of 2,179. The median age was 36.6 years. 26.5% of residents were under the age of 18 and 12.2% of residents were 65 years of age or older. For every 100 females there were 99.4 males, and for every 100 females age 18 and over there were 95.0 males age 18 and over.

0.0% of residents lived in urban areas, while 100.0% lived in rural areas.

There were 731 households in Varnell, of which 44.5% had children under the age of 18 living in them. Of all households, 61.7% were married-couple households, 11.2% were households with a male householder and no spouse or partner present, and 21.6% were households with a female householder and no spouse or partner present. About 13.9% of all households were made up of individuals and 7.0% had someone living alone who was 65 years of age or older.

There were 769 housing units, of which 4.9% were vacant. The homeowner vacancy rate was 2.1% and the rental vacancy rate was 0.8%.

=== 2010 census ===
As of the 2010 Census Varnell had a population of 1,744. The racial and ethnic composition of the population was 83.0% white (74.8% non-Hispanic white), 4.3% black or African American, 0.6% Native American, 1.5% Vietnamese, 1.3% other Asian, 8.0% some other race (0.3% non-Hispanic of some other race) and 1.4% from two or more races. 17.3% of the population was Hispanic or Latino, with the largest portion of that being the 14.0% of the population that was Mexican.

=== 2000 census ===
As of the census of 2000, there were 1,491 people, 510 households, and 421 families residing in the city. The population density was 606.9 inhabitants per square mile (234.3/km^{2}). There were 526 housing units at an average density of 214.1 units per square mile (82.7 units/km^{2}). The racial makeup of the city was 88.73% White, 4.76% African American, 0.07% Native American, 0.40% Asian, 3.55% from other races, and 2.48% from two or more races. Hispanic or Latino of any race were 5.23% of the population.

There were 510 households, out of which 43.7% had children under the age of 18 living with them, 65.7% were married couples living together, 13.1% had a female householder with no husband present, and 17.3% were non-families. 12.9% of all households were made up of individuals, and 3.3% had someone living alone who was 65 years of age or older. The average household size was 2.92 and the average family size was 3.21.

In the city, the population was spread out, with 30.2% under the age of 18, 9.1% from 18 to 24, 32.9% from 25 to 44, 21.4% from 45 to 64, and 6.4% who were 65 years of age or older. The median age was 32 years. For every 100 females, there were 92.6 males. For every 100 females age 18 and over, there were 90.0 males.

The median income for a household in the city was $46,875, and the median income for a family was $48,674. Males had a median income of $34,000 versus $25,216 for females. The per capita income for the city was $18,214. About 5.8% of families and 6.8% of the population were below the poverty line, including 11.3% of those under age 18 and 15.3% of those age 65 or over.

== Education ==
Varnell is in the Whitfield County School District.

Area schools include:

- Varnell Elementary School's
- New Hope Elementary School
- Beaverdale Elementary School
- New Hope Middle School's
- Coahulla Creek High School
- Northwest Whitfield High School
