= Dalton Public Schools =

School district in Georgia (U.S. state)

Address
- 300 West Waugh Street Dalton, Georgia, 30720; United States
- Coordinates: 34.774182°N 84.972959°W

District information
- Grades: Pre-kindergarten – 12
- Superintendent: Steven Craft
- Accreditation(s): Southern Association of Colleges and Schools; Georgia Accrediting Commission

Students and staff
- Enrollment: 7,675 (2022–23)
- Faculty: 615.30 (FTE)
- Staff: 463.00 (FTE)
- Student–teacher ratio: 12.47

Other information
- Telephone: (706) 876-4000
- Website: daltonpublicschools.com

Dalton Public Schools is a public school district in Dalton, Georgia. Its attendance boundary is the Dalton city limits.

== Schools ==
DPS has six elementary schools, one middle school, and three high schools.

=== High schools ===
- Dalton High School
- The Dalton Academy
- Dalton Junior High School

=== Middle schools ===
- Hammond Creek Middle School

=== Elementary schools ===
- Blue Ridge Elementary School
- Brookwood Elementary School
- City Park Elementary School
- Park Creek Elementary School
- Roan Elementary School
- Westwood Elementary School

== See also ==
- Whitfield County School District, which operates public schools serving the remainder of Whitfield County
