= Marla Maples =

American actress, model, singer and host (born 1963)

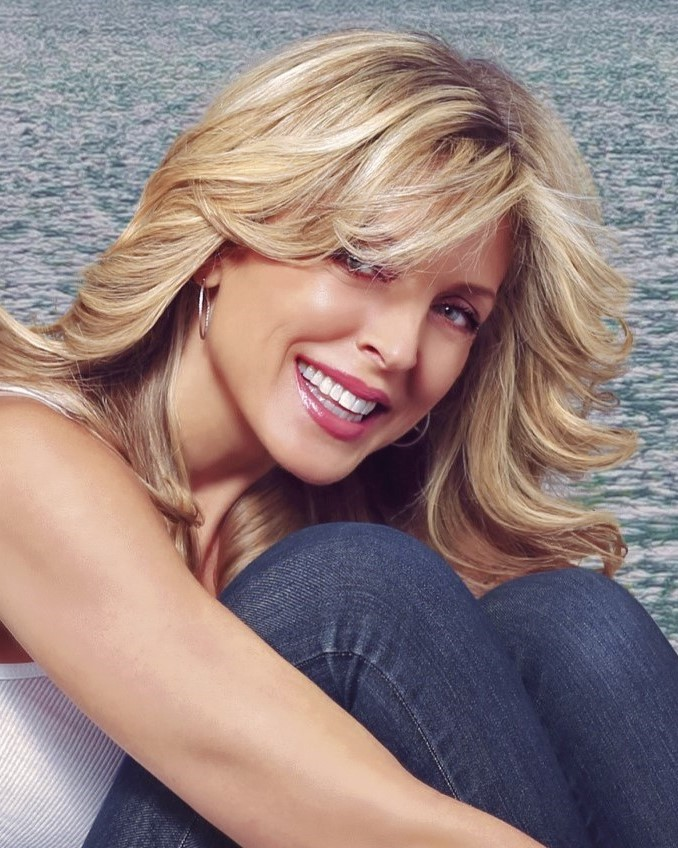
- Maples in 2014
- Born: Marla Ann Maples; October 27, 1963 (age 62); Cohutta, Georgia, U.S.
- Other name: Marla Maples Trump
- Education: University of Georgia (attended)
- Occupations: Actress; television personality; presenter; model; singer
- Years active: 1981–present
- Political party: Republican
- Spouse: Donald Trump (m. 1993; div. 1999)
- Children: Tiffany Trump
- Relatives: Trump family (during marriage)

Marla Ann Maples (born October 27, 1963) is an American actress, television host, singer and model. She was the second wife of Donald Trump, the 45th and 47th president of the United States. They married two months after the birth of their daughter, Tiffany, in 1993. Donald and Marla separated in 1997 and divorced in 1999.

== Early life and education ==
Maples was born on October 27, 1963, in Cohutta, Georgia, U.S. Her mother, Ann Locklear Maples, was a homemaker and model, and her father, Stanley Edward Maples, was a real estate developer, county commissioner, singer, and songwriter. She has one half-sister from her father's previous marriage.

Maples attended Northwest Whitfield High School in Tunnel Hill, Georgia, where she played basketball, served as class secretary and was crowned the 1980–1981 homecoming queen during her senior year (she returned for the 1991 homecoming to crown the school's new queen).

After graduating from high school in 1981, Maples competed in beauty contests and pageants. In 1983, she won the Miss Resaca Beach Poster Girl Contest, in 1984 she was the runner-up to Miss Georgia USA, and in 1985 she won the Miss Hawaiian Tropic.

She entered the University of Georgia in 1981 but left college before graduating.

== Career ==
=== Film, television, and theater ===
In 1991, Maples appeared as a celebrity guest at WWF WrestleMania VII, serving as special guest timekeeper in the main event match between Hulk Hogan and defending WWF Champion Sgt. Slaughter. In that year, Maples also made a special appearance in the hit television series Designing Women as herself. In August 1992, Maples joined the cast of the Tony Award winning Broadway musical The Will Rogers Follies as "Ziegfeld's Favorite", a role originated by Cady Huffman when the show opened in May 1991.

In 1994, Maples appeared alongside then-husband Donald Trump in a cameo appearance in the episode "For Sale by Owner" of The Fresh Prince of Bel-Air and the television series Something Wilder in 1994.

Maples co-hosted the 1996 and 1997 Miss Universe Pageant and the 1997 Miss USA Pageant, both of which were owned by her then-husband.

Maples appeared in the films Maximum Overdrive (1986), Executive Decision (1996), For Richer or Poorer (1997), Happiness (1998), Richie Rich's Christmas Wish (1998), Black and White (1999), Two of Hearts (1999), Loving Annabelle (2006), A Christmas Too Many (2007), and A Nanny for Christmas (2010).

In 2011, she returned to New York for Love, Loss and What I Wore, an off-Broadway production. In 2013, Maples was featured on Oprah: Where Are They Now?

Since then, she appeared in Switching Lanes, directed by Thomas Mikal Ford.

On March 8, 2016, Maples was announced as one of the celebrities who would compete on season 22 of Dancing with the Stars alongside her Switching Lanes co-star, Kim Fields. She was partnered with professional dancer Tony Dovolani. Maples and Dovolani were eliminated on Week 4 of competition and finished in 10th place. Maples also joined the women of ABC's morning talk show, The View, as a guest co-host on March 11, 2016.

Maples is a keynote speaker with the London Speakers Bureau, focusing on inspiring women, wellness, spirituality, and motivation.

Maples was featured in the Summer of Peace Summit 2018 with the opportunity to discuss topics of peace and finding common ground.

Maples spoke at the 2018 Global Summit on Science, Spirituality, and Environment in India; the event brought together speakers from around the world to discuss the integration of science and spirituality, as well as self-transformation and world-transformation.

Maples was a guest speaker on the Journeys of Faith podcast with Paula Faris in 2018.

=== Radio and music ===
Maples hosted her own talk radio show, Awakening with Marla, on Contact Talk Radio. Her guests included naturopathic doctors, authors, and astrologers. Maples's album The Endless, released in August 2013, is a musical journey of spiritual awakening and transformational energy, featuring thought leaders such as the Dalai Lama, Michael Beckwith, and Deepak Chopra. In December 2012, Maples won a "Hollywood Music in Media Award" for best New Age/Ambient song, for "House of Love", from that album.

=== Other ===
In 1990, Maples starred in an advertising campaign for No Excuses jeans. In 1993, she designed a line of maternity clothes, sold in several major department stores. In January 2000, a memoir by Maples, All That Glitters Is Not Gold, was announced by the ReganBooks division of HarperCollins Publishers. In February 2002, a spokeswoman for the publishing company said, "The author and publisher by mutual consent have agreed not to publish the book."

Maples makes personalized videos through the website Cameo.

== Personal life ==
=== Relationships ===
Maples's relationship with Donald Trump was initiated while he was married to his first wife, Ivana, whom Trump divorced in 1990. Maples met him in 1984 and had a highly publicized relationship later with at least one breakup. Maples and Trump had one child, daughter Tiffany Trump, born on October 13, 1993.

According to Maples, the 1993 Long Island Rail Road shooting, on December 7, caused Trump to reevaluate his life and propose to her. The couple married on December 20, 1993, at New York's Plaza Hotel, in a ceremony reportedly attended by 1,000 guests including Rosie O'Donnell, O.J. Simpson, and Jeffrey Epstein, on whose infamous plane she allegedly traveled at least once in the mid-1990s.

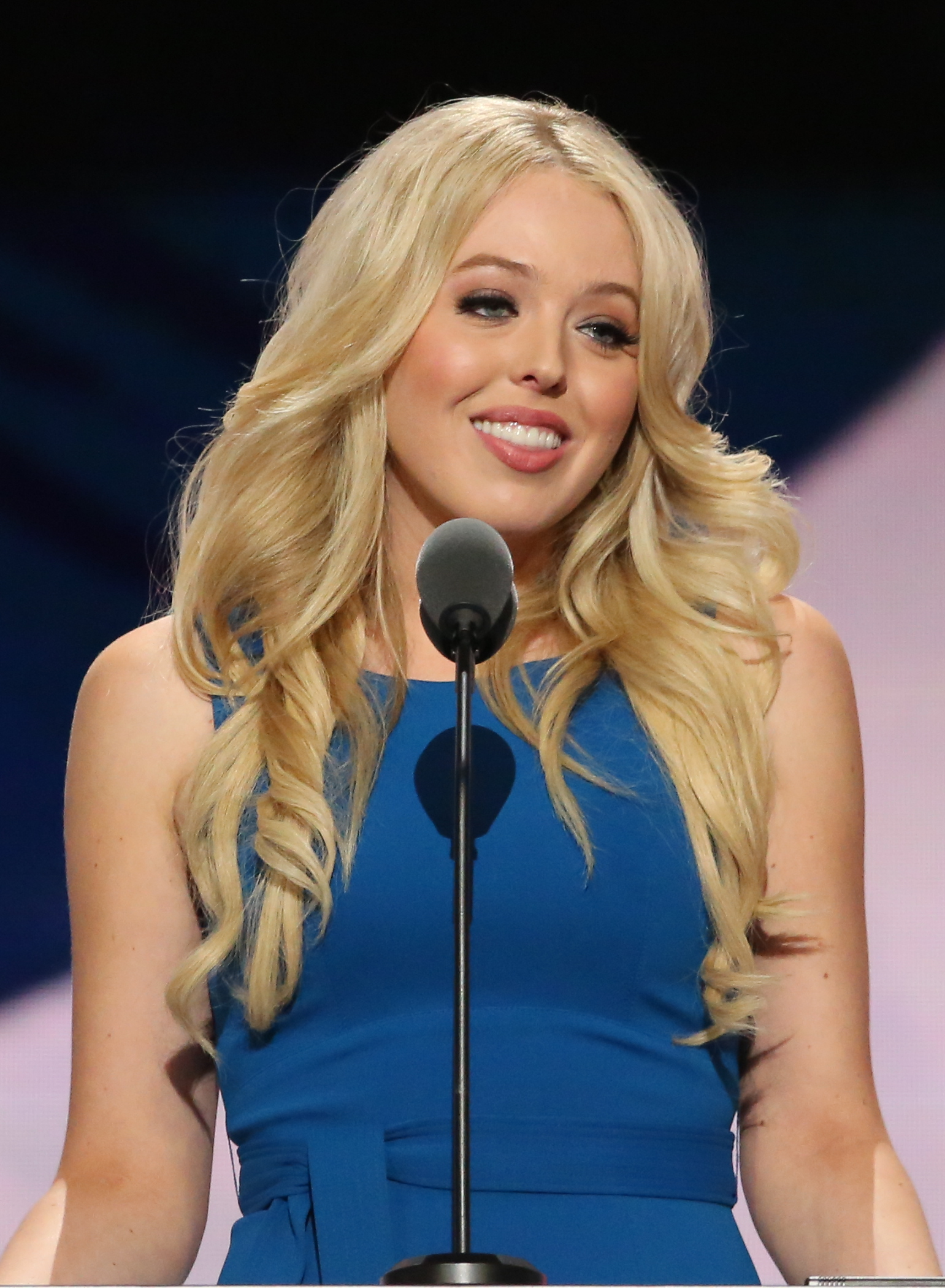
Maples' daughter, Tiffany Trump

In 1996, Trump fired his bodyguard Spencer Wagner four months after a police officer found Maples and the bodyguard together under a lifeguard stand on a deserted beach at 4:00 a.m. Both Maples and Trump denied that she was having an affair, despite reports in the National Enquirer and other tabloids; the bodyguard himself told conflicting stories about the incident. Maples and Trump separated in May 1997 and divorced on June 8, 1999. Under the terms of their prenuptial agreement and divorce settlement, Maples is bound by a confidentiality agreement regarding their marriage.

=== Philanthropy ===
Maples is committed to supporting charities and non-profit organizations and is a long-time vocal advocate of Kids Creating Peace, an organization uniting Israeli and Palestinian children.

Maples is involved with AWARENYC.org as an advisory board member. AWARE (Assisting Women through Action, Resources & Education) is a grassroots organization dedicated to promoting awareness and generating funds in order to make meaningful improvements in the lives of women and girls in the New York City community and worldwide.

Maples also supports and is on the Steering Committee for The Louis Armstrong Center for Music and Medicine.

=== Health and wellness ===
Maples is an advocate of health and wellness. Maples describes herself as a "mostly-vegan" who avoids dairy, eats organic, and chooses to be gluten-free. She also joined Robert F. Kennedy Jr.'s Children's Health Defense.

== Filmography ==
=== Film ===
Year	Title	Role	Notes
1986	Maximum Overdrive	2nd Woman	
1987	Funland	Mother	
1996	Executive Decision	Nancy	
1997	For Richer or Poorer	Cynthia	
1998	Happiness	Ann Chambeau	
1999	Black and White	Muffy	
2006	Loving Annabelle	Lauren	
2015	Switching Lanes	Stacey Jefferson	
2021	The Birthday Cake	Aunt Emma	

=== Television ===
Year	Title	Role	Notes
1989	Dallas	Maggie	Episode: "Cally on a Hot Tin Roof"
1991	P.S. I Luv U	Leslie	Episode: "Where There's a Will, There's a Dani"
1991	Designing Women	Herself	Episode: "Marriage Most Foul"
1994	The Fresh Prince of Bel-Air	Herself	Episode: "For Sale by Owner"
1994	Something Wilder	Donna	Episode: "Love Native American Style"
1996	Clueless	Buyer #2	Episode: "Cher, Inc."
1997	The Big Easy	Grace Belvedere	Episode: "Platinum Blonde"
1997	Spin City	Jennifer	Episode: "The Goodbye Girl"
1997	The Christmas List	Faith	Television film
1998	The Nanny	Herself	Episode: "The Best Man"
1998	Richie Rich's Christmas Wish	Mrs. Van Dough	Television film
1999	Two of Hearts	Joan Michaelson	Television film
1999	Sunset Beach	Barbara Birch	Episode #1.559
2007	A Christmas Too Many	June	Television film
2010	A Nanny for Christmas	Brandy	Television film
2014	Liv and Maddie	Amy Becker	Episode: "BFF-A-Rooney"
2019	The Righteous Gemstones	Gay Nancy	3 episodes
