= Robert Loveman =

American poet

Robert Loveman (April 11, 1864 – July 10, 1923) was an American poet. Born to a Jewish family in Cleveland, Ohio, he was educated at the Dalton Academy in Dalton, Georgia, later attending the University of Alabama where he received his A.M. Loveman lived with Friedman relatives at the Battle Friedman House while attending the University of Alabama. It was during this time he lived there that he wrote his famous "Rain Song" poem, inspired by the gardens surrounding the house. Loveman lived in Dalton for much of his life, and wrote much of his verse there.

Loveman's poem "The Rain Song" (also known as "April Rain") become very well known and was anthologized in many books of verse. It later inspired the Al Jolson song "April Showers." A well-known Southern poet, Loveman's song "Georgia", with music by Lollie Belle Wylie, was the official state song of Georgia before 1979 (when it was replaced by "Georgia on My Mind"). He died in Hot Springs, Arkansas on July 9, 1923. A biographical study by William Stanley Hoole, It's Raining Violets: The Life and Poetry of Robert Loveman, was published in 1981.

== Bibliography ==
- Poems (1897)
- A Book of Verses (1900)
- Songs from a Georgia Garden: and Echoes from the Gates of Silence (1904)
- The Blushful South and Hippocrene: Being Songs (1909)
- The Gates of Silence With Interludes of Song (1903)
- On the Way to Willowdale: Being Other Songs from a Georgia Garden (1912)
- Sonnets of the Strife: With Songs (1917)
