= Whitfield County, Georgia =

County in Georgia, United States

- County
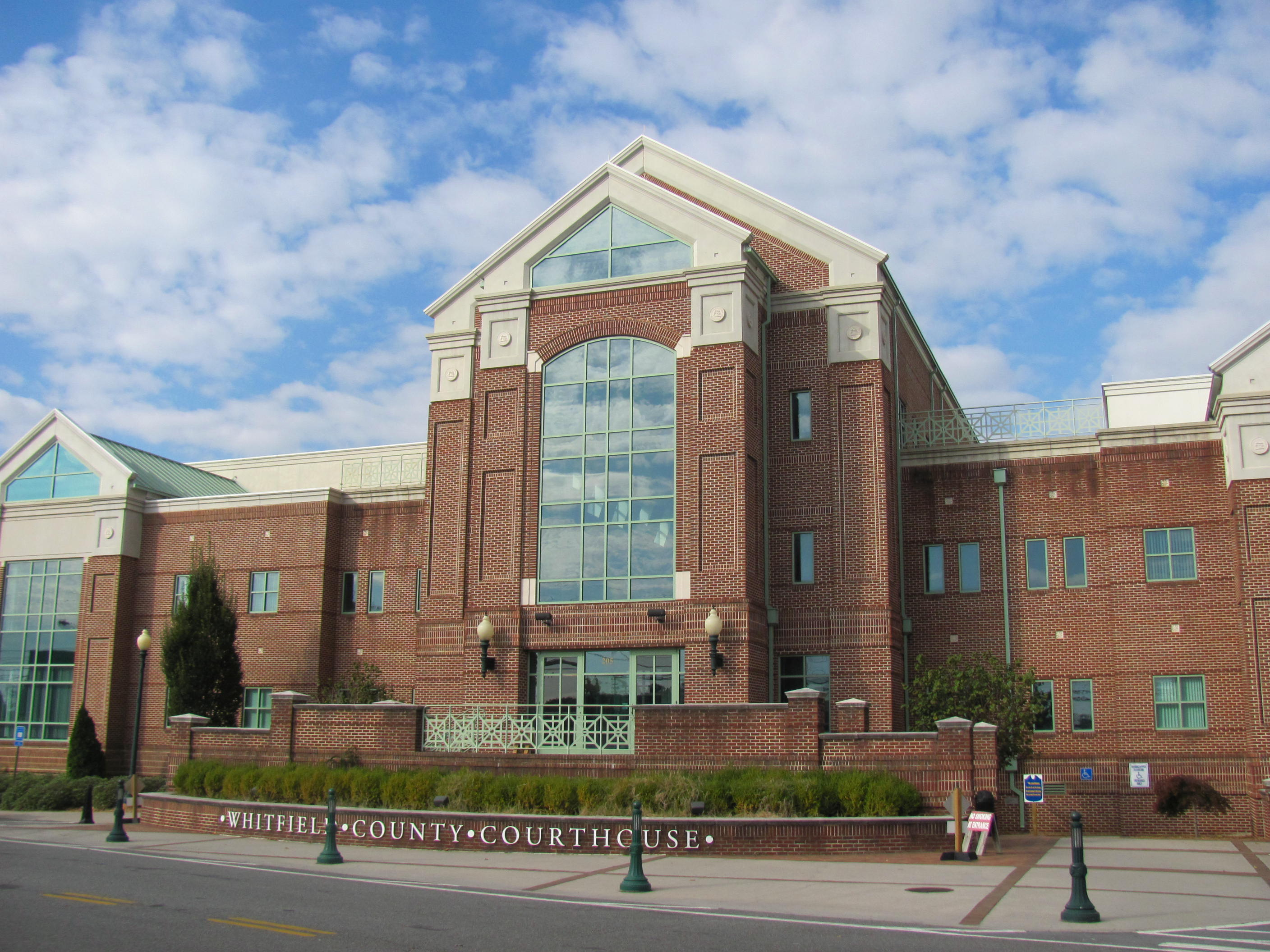
- Whitfield County Courthouse in October 2013

- Flag Seal

- Location within the U.S. state of Georgia
- Coordinates: 34°48′N 84°58′W
- Country: United States
- State: Georgia
- Founded: December 30, 1851; 174 years ago
- Named for: George Whitefield
- Seat: Dalton
- Largest city: Dalton

Area
  - Total: 291 sq mi (750 km^{2})
  - Land: 290 sq mi (750 km^{2})
  - Water: 0.6 sq mi (1.6 km^{2}) 0.2%

Population (2020)
  - Total: 102,864
  - Estimate (2025): 106,212 ▲
  - Density: 350/sq mi (140/km^{2})
- Time zone: UTC−5 (Eastern)
  - Summer (DST): UTC−4 (EDT)
- Congressional district: 14th
- Website: whitfieldcountyga.com

Whitfield County is a county in the Northwest region of the U.S. state of Georgia. As of the 2020 census shows a population of 102,864. The county seat is Dalton. The county was created on December 30, 1851, and named after George Whitefield, Methodist evangelist. The "e" was omitted to reflect the pronunciation of his name.

Whitfield County is part of the Dalton metropolitan area, Georgia, which is also included in the Chattanooga–Cleveland–Dalton combined statistical area.

== Geography ==
According to the U.S. Census Bureau, the county has a total area of 291 square miles (750 km^{2}), of which 290 square miles (750 km^{2}) is land and 0.6 square miles (1.6 km^{2}) (0.2%) is water. The majority of Whitfield County is located in the Conasauga River sub-basin in the ACT River Basin (Coosa-Tallapoosa River Basin), with a part of the western edge of the county is located in the Middle Tennessee-Chickamauga sub-basin of the Middle Tennessee-Hiwassee basin. A very small portion of the southern edge of the county is located in the Oostanaula River sub-basin in the larger ACT River Basin.

=== Adjacent counties ===
- Bradley County, Tennessee (north)
- Murray County (east)
- Gordon County (south)
- Walker County (west-southwest)
- Catoosa County (west-northwest)
- Hamilton County, Tennessee (northwest)

=== National protected area ===
- Chattahoochee National Forest (part)

== Transportation ==
=== Major highways ===
- Interstate 75 / State Route 401 (unsigned)
- U.S. Route 41 State Route 3
  - State Route 3 Connector
- U.S. Route 76
- State Route 2
- State Route 52
- State Route 71
- State Route 201
- State Route 286

=== Pedestrians and cycling ===
- Pinhoti Trail

== Demographics ==
Historical population
Census	Pop.	Note	%±
1860	10,047		—
1870	10,117		0.7%
1880	11,900		17.6%
1890	12,916		8.5%
1900	14,509		12.3%
1910	15,934		9.8%
1920	16,897		6.0%
1930	20,808		23.1%
1940	26,105		25.5%
1950	34,432		31.9%
1960	42,109		22.3%
1970	55,108		30.9%
1980	65,789		19.4%
1990	72,462		10.1%
2000	83,525		15.3%
2010	102,599		22.8%
2020	102,864		0.3%
2025 (est.)	106,212	▲	3.3%
U.S. Decennial Census; 1790-1880 1890-1910; 1920-1930 1930-1940; 1940-1950 1960-1980; 1980-2000 2010 2020

=== Racial and ethnic composition ===
Whitfield County, Georgia – Racial and ethnic composition Note: the US Census treats Hispanic/Latino as an ethnic category. This table excludes Latinos from the racial categories and assigns them to a separate category. Hispanics/Latinos may be of any race.
Race / Ethnicity (NH = Non-Hispanic)	Pop 1980	Pop 1990	Pop 2000	Pop 2010	Pop 2020	% 1980	% 1990	% 2000	% 2010	% 2020
White alone (NH)	62,458	66,794	60,338	63,818	57,875	94.94%	92.18%	72.24%	62.20%	56.26%
Black or African American alone (NH)	2,503	2,869	3,066	3,631	3,553	3.80%	3.96%	3.67%	3.54%	3.45%
Native American or Alaska Native alone (NH)	132	145	181	180	182	0.20%	0.20%	0.22%	0.18%	0.18%
Asian alone (NH)	144	318	736	1,292	1,394	0.22%	0.44%	0.88%	1.26%	1.36%
Native Hawaiian or Pacific Islander alone (NH)	x	x	25	29	19	x	x	0.03%	0.03%	0.02%
Other race alone (NH)	26	15	82	96	304	0.04%	0.02%	0.10%	0.09%	0.30%
Mixed race or Multiracial (NH)	x	x	678	1,082	2,621	x	x	0.81%	1.05%	2.55%
Hispanic or Latino (any race)	526	2,321	18,419	32,471	36,916	0.80%	3.20%	22.05%	31.65%	35.89%
Total	65,789	72,462	83,525	102,599	102,864	100.00%	100.00%	100.00%	100.00%	100.00%

=== 2020 census ===
As of the 2020 census, the county had a population of 102,864, along with 36,134 households and 25,351 families; the median age was 36.1 years. Twenty-five point nine percent of residents were under the age of 18 and 14.3% of residents were 65 years of age or older. For every 100 females there were 98.0 males, and for every 100 females age 18 and over there were 95.3 males age 18 and over.

65.1% of residents lived in urban areas, while 34.9% lived in rural areas.

The racial makeup of the county was 63.3% White, 3.7% Black or African American, 2.0% American Indian and Alaska Native, 1.4% Asian, 0.0% Native Hawaiian and Pacific Islander, 17.7% from some other race, and 11.9% from two or more races. Hispanic or Latino residents of any race comprised 35.9% of the population.

There were 36,134 households in the county, of which 37.1% had children under the age of 18 living with them and 25.7% had a female householder with no spouse or partner present. About 22.9% of all households were made up of individuals and 9.7% had someone living alone who was 65 years of age or older.

There were 38,876 housing units, of which 7.1% were vacant. Among occupied housing units, 64.7% were owner-occupied and 35.3% were renter-occupied. The homeowner vacancy rate was 1.1% and the rental vacancy rate was 6.2%.

=== 2010 census ===
As of the 2010 United States census, there were 102,599 people, 35,180 households, and 26,090 families residing in the county. The population density was 353.2 inhabitants per square mile (136.4/km^{2}). There were 39,899 housing units at an average density of 137.4 per square mile (53.1/km^{2}). The racial makeup of the county was 76.6% white, 3.7% black or African American, 1.3% Asian, 0.6% American Indian, 0.1% Pacific islander, 15.0% from other races, and 2.6% from two or more races. Those of Hispanic or Latino origin made up 31.6% of the population. In terms of ancestry, 12.1% were American, 11.0% were Irish, 8.4% were English, and 7.5% were German.

Of the 35,180 households, 41.4% had children under the age of 18 living with them, 54.4% were married couples living together, 13.4% had a female householder with no husband present, 25.8% were non-families, and 21.4% of all households were made up of individuals. The average household size was 2.89 and the average family size was 3.36. The median age was 34.0 years.

The median income for a household in the county was $42,345 and the median income for a family was $48,991. Males had a median income of $34,150 versus $27,315 for females. The per capita income for the county was $19,780. About 15.6% of families and 19.2% of the population were below the poverty line, including 26.7% of those under age 18 and 13.8% of those age 65 or over.

=== 2000 census ===
As of the 2000 Census, there were 29,385 households, out of which 36.80% had children under the age of 18 living with them, 59.50% were married couples living together, 10.80% had a female householder with no husband present, and 24.60% were non-families. 20.60% of all households were made up of individuals, and 8.20% had someone living alone who was 65 years of age or older. The average household size was 2.82 and the average family size was 3.24.

In the county, the population was spread out, with 27.30% under the age of 18, 10.00% from 18 to 24, 30.80% from 25 to 44, 21.50% from 45 to 64, and 10.30% who were 65 years of age or older. The median age was 33 years. For every 100 females, there were 101.30 males. For every 100 females age 18 and over, there were 98.90 males.

The median income for a household in the county was $39,377, and the median income for a family was $44,652. Males had a median income of $30,122 versus $23,709 for females. The per capita income for the county was $18,515. About 8.60% of families and 11.50% of the population were below the poverty line, including 12.70% of those under age 18 and 11.70% of those age 65 or over.

== Education ==
=== Whitfield County Schools ===
==== High schools ====
- Northwest Whitfield High School
- Southeast Whitfield High School
- Coahulla Creek High School

==== Middle schools ====
- Eastbrook Middle School
- New Hope Middle School
- North Whitfield Middle School
- Valley Point Middle School
- Westside Middle School

==== Elementary schools ====
- Antioch Elementary School
- Beaverdale Elementary School
- Cedar Ridge Elementary School
- Cohutta Elementary School
- Dawnville Elementary School
- Dug Gap Elementary School
- Eastside Elementary School
- New Hope Elementary School
- Pleasant Grove Elementary School
- Tunnel Hill Elementary School
- Valley Point Elementary School
- Varnell Elementary School
- Westside Elementary School

==== Alternative schools ====
- Crossroads Academy
- Phoenix High School

=== Dalton Public Schools ===
==== High schools ====
- Dalton High School
- Morris Innovative High School

==== Middle schools ====
- Dalton Middle School

==== Elementary schools ====
- Brookwood Elementary
- Blue Ridge Elementary
- City Park Elementary
- Park Creek Elementary
- Roan Elementary
- Westwood Elementary

=== Private schools ===
- Cedar Valley Christian Academy
- Christian Heritage School
- Learning Tree School

== Communities ==
=== Cities ===
- Dalton
- Tunnel Hill
- Varnell

=== Towns ===
- Cohutta

=== Unincorporated communities ===
- Rocky Face
- Dawnville
- Mill Creek
- Mt. Vernon
- Tilton
- Toonerville

== Politics ==
United States presidential election results for Whitfield County, Georgia
Year	Republican		Democratic		Third party(ies)	
Year	No.	%	No.	%	No.	%
1880	172	15.94%	907	84.06%	0	0.00%
1884	570	39.23%	883	60.77%	0	0.00%
1888	421	31.89%	837	63.41%	62	4.70%
1892	264	15.81%	1,021	61.14%	385	23.05%
1896	494	34.31%	857	59.51%	89	6.18%
1900	412	36.69%	587	52.27%	124	11.04%
1904	427	33.49%	569	44.63%	279	21.88%
1908	775	52.97%	586	40.05%	102	6.97%
1912	102	7.74%	772	58.62%	443	33.64%
1916	16	0.88%	1,093	60.19%	707	38.93%
1920	1,073	58.47%	762	41.53%	0	0.00%
1924	668	33.47%	1,236	61.92%	92	4.61%
1928	1,650	58.84%	1,154	41.16%	0	0.00%
1932	483	16.59%	2,384	81.87%	45	1.55%
1936	877	26.05%	2,481	73.69%	9	0.27%
1940	991	23.83%	3,162	76.03%	6	0.14%
1944	1,032	26.74%	2,827	73.26%	0	0.00%
1948	1,249	23.17%	3,419	63.42%	723	13.41%
1952	2,795	37.49%	4,661	62.51%	0	0.00%
1956	4,205	49.65%	4,264	50.35%	0	0.00%
1960	4,148	53.51%	3,604	46.49%	0	0.00%
1964	4,546	38.27%	7,330	61.70%	4	0.03%
1968	4,828	41.95%	2,726	23.69%	3,954	34.36%
1972	8,591	81.46%	1,955	18.54%	0	0.00%
1976	4,498	30.04%	10,475	69.96%	0	0.00%
1980	6,404	38.96%	9,691	58.95%	344	2.09%
1984	11,957	69.35%	5,284	30.65%	0	0.00%
1988	12,761	73.12%	4,618	26.46%	72	0.41%
1992	12,003	53.97%	7,335	32.98%	2,901	13.04%
1996	12,368	56.69%	7,720	35.39%	1,729	7.93%
2000	15,852	68.03%	7,034	30.19%	416	1.79%
2004	19,297	73.10%	6,933	26.26%	169	0.64%
2008	19,230	69.20%	8,167	29.39%	394	1.42%
2012	19,305	71.58%	7,210	26.74%	453	1.68%
2016	21,537	69.98%	7,937	25.79%	1,302	4.23%
2020	25,644	69.75%	10,680	29.05%	442	1.20%
2024	28,655	71.95%	10,953	27.50%	220	0.55%

United States Senate election results for Whitfield County, Georgia2
Year	Republican		Democratic		Third party(ies)	
Year	No.	%	No.	%	No.	%
2020	25,158	69.31%	10,177	28.04%	962	2.65%
2020	22,501	70.88%	9,245	29.12%	0	0.00%

United States Senate election results for Whitfield County, Georgia3
Year	Republican		Democratic		Third party(ies)	
Year	No.	%	No.	%	No.	%
2020	12,905	36.30%	3,876	10.90%	18,769	52.80%
2020	25,636	70.61%	10,670	29.39%	0	0.00%
2022	19,387	72.10%	6,904	25.68%	597	2.22%
2022	17,726	74.52%	6,061	25.48%	0	0.00%

Georgia Gubernatorial election results for Whitfield County
Year	Republican		Democratic		Third party(ies)	
Year	No.	%	No.	%	No.	%
2022	20,919	77.44%	5,874	21.74%	221	0.82%

Like much of the rest of Georgia, Whitfield County was strongly Democratic in the early 20th century, albeit less so than other parts of the state; it went Republican for William Howard Taft in 1908, Warren G. Harding in 1920 and for Herbert Hoover in 1928. The three Republicans would lose Georgia but win their respective national elections.

Despite being strongly Democratic through Franklin D. Roosevelt's four elections and in the subsequent two, the county only narrowly went for Democrat Adlai Stevenson II in 1956 and flipped Republican for Richard Nixon in 1960. It would flip back to the Democrats and Lyndon B. Johnson in 1964, even as Barry Goldwater would become the first Republican to ever carry the state of Georgia in a presidential election. However, it would be one of the last hurrahs for the Democratic Party in Whitfield County; Hubert Humphrey would finish third here in 1968 behind Richard Nixon and third-party candidate George Wallace, and it would give Nixon over 80% of the vote in 1972. It snapped back Democratic for native Georgian Jimmy Carter in 1976 and 1980, but this would be the final time it voted Democratic at the presidential level. It has become a safely Republican area throughout the remainder of the 20th century and into the 21st century. As of the 2020s, Whitfield County is a strongly Republican voting county, voting 72% for Donald Trump in 2024.

For elections to the United States House of Representatives, Whitfield County is part of Georgia's 14th congressional district, currently represented by Clay Fuller. For elections to the Georgia State Senate, Whitfield County is part of District 54. For elections to the Georgia House of Representatives, Whitfield County is represented by districts 2, 4 and 6.

== See also ==
- National Register of Historic Places listings in Whitfield County, Georgia
- List of counties in Georgia
