= Cohutta, Georgia =

Town in Georgia, United States

- Town
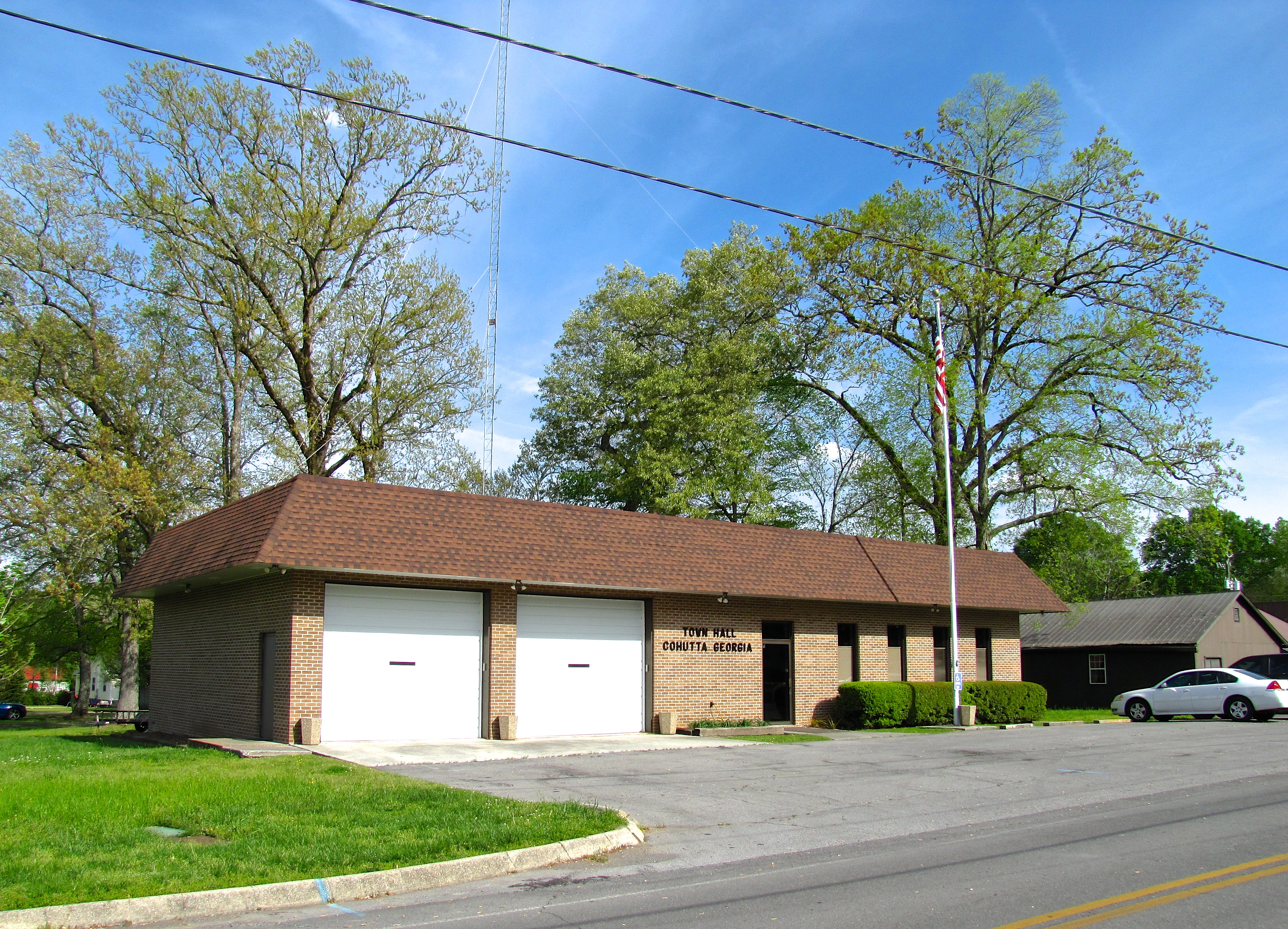
- Town hall

- Location in Whitfield County and the state of Georgia
- Coordinates: 34°57′33″N 84°57′10″W
- Country: United States
- State: Georgia
- County: Whitfield

Government
  - Mayor: Brian Johnson

Area
  - Total: 4.92 sq mi (12.73 km^{2})
  - Land: 4.92 sq mi (12.73 km^{2})
  - Water: 0 sq mi (0.00 km^{2})
- Elevation: 863 ft (263 m)

Population (2020)
  - Total: 764
  - Density: 155.5/sq mi (60.02/km^{2})
- Time zone: UTC-5 (Eastern (EST))
  - Summer (DST): UTC-4 (EDT)
- ZIP code: 30710
- Area codes: 706/762
- FIPS code: 13-17496
- GNIS feature ID: 0331428
- Website: https://www.townofcohuttaga.com/

Cohutta (/kəˈhʌtə/) is a town in Whitfield County, Georgia, United States. It is part of the Dalton Metropolitan Statistical Area. The population was 764 at the 2020 census.

== History ==
The town emerged as a stop on the railroad from Cleveland, Tennessee, to Dalton, Georgia, and served as a transportation and commercial center for the surrounding farming areas. According to local lore, the town was originally known as "Shakerag," from the rag would-be passengers would wave to stop trains passing through.

In the 1920s, the town had a bank and a hotel, as well a high school, and was frequented especially in summer by inhabitants of Chattanooga seeking cooler temperatures. The high school burned down in 1952 and was not rebuilt.

As recently as the late 1960s, Cohutta had a small supermarket, three smaller "sundry" stores, a feed and seed, and a hair salon. The improvement of roads and the ease of access to larger cities (in this case, Dalton) drew shoppers away, so that by the 1990s, Cohutta had no large businesses at all with the exception of a downtown hardware store, a general store near the main road leading downtown from SR-71, and two convenience stores located at each end of town on the state highway route. Over the last decade, the surrounding area has become something of a bedroom community for Dalton, with housing developments taking over many of the farms in the area. Regardless, Cohutta maintained all town services during this time as required by the charter to include town police, fire, and sanitation services to incorporated properties.

Town services are still fully maintained in 2022 with two town clerks, a staffed public works department, municipal court staff with judge and solicitor, an environmental court, and a full-service town police department which is available 24–7–365. In 2021-2022 the town has approximately 20+ employees in various roles and positions.

In May 2026, the mayor, Ron Shinnick, fired the town's entire police force after six officers filed formal complaints about the mayor's wife, whose employment with the town had been terminated, but still had access to personal information. The police force was reinstated by the town council after two days with back pay allocated, as the firing did not follow the town's charter which require a 30-day notice before any firing or suspension of any town employees. Shinnick was also prevented from firing the officers in the next 30 days, with the council deciding on a possible removal of Shinnick as mayor in a future meeting. Shinnick later resigned as mayor on May 15, and was replaced in the interem by councilwoman Sandy Clayborne.

== Geography ==
According to the United States Census Bureau, the town has a total area of 2.5 square miles (6.5 km^{2}), of which 2.5 square miles (6.5 km^{2}) is land and 0.04 square miles (0.10 km^{2}) (1.59%) is water. Cohutta also has 4.2 miles of state highway (SR-71 also known as Cleveland Highway), from the Tennessee state line to Bank of Dalton Drive in their jurisdiction, per Georgia state databases.

== Demographics ==
Historical population
Census	Pop.	Note	%±
1890	268		—
1970	393		—
1980	407		3.6%
1990	529		30.0%
2000	582		10.0%
2010	661		13.6%
2020	764		15.6%
U.S. Decennial Census

As of the census of 2010, there were 661 people, 275 households, and 170 families residing in the town. The population density was 264.4 inhabitants per square mile (102.1/km^{2}). The racial makeup of the town was 95.76% White, 2.27% African American, 0.30% Native American, 0.61% Asian, 0.61% from other races, and 0.45% from two or more races. Hispanic or Latino of any race were 1.97% of the population.

In the town, the population was spread out, with 23.0% under the age of 18, 63.7% between the ages of 18 and 64, and 13.3% who were 65 years of age or older. The median age was 37 years. For every 100 females, there were 89.1 males.

In 2000, the median income for a household in the town was $41,563, and the median income for a family was $44,444. Males had a median income of $30,592 versus $22,232 for females. The per capita income for the town was $17,510. About 8.2% of families and 6.9% of the population were below the poverty line, including 8.1% of those under age 18 and 3.4% of those age 65 or over.

== Culture ==
Cohutta prides itself on the Red Clay State Historic Park that serves as a national Native American meeting ground, Cherokee memorial with a museum, and outdoor park and recreation center for visitors. This part of the state is rich in Cherokee history as well as classic southern heritage.

The city is home to the Cohutta Fish Hatchery, formerly a part of the U.S. Game and Fish Department and is now operated by the University of Georgia. The hatchery has a small visitors' center and aquarium, open to the public.

Since 2019, the Town of Cohutta has begun a revitalization of the historic downtown district to include family-owned small businesses and restaurants that have been successful even through the COVID-19 pandemic. The Town of Cohutta community growth before and during COVID-19 has remained positive. Cohutta also prides itself with many annual events to include the hallmark Town of Cohutta Independence Day Celebration that sees upwards of 5000+ visitors to the town due to the event. Other annual community events include a street dance, Ruritan Club Chicken-Q and Christmas parade with annual caroling on the historic downtown Martin's Corner. Information regarding the Town of Cohutta, administration, community events, and much more may be located on the town's website, which is updated regularly per town administration.

== Notable people ==
- Mallary Hope, country and Christian singer-songwriter
- Marla Maples, ex-wife of President Donald Trump
