= Mount Vernon, Whitfield County, Georgia =

Mount Vernon, Georgia
- unincorporated community
- Location within Georgia
- Coordinates: 34°47′03″N 85°03′07″W
- Country: United States
- State: Georgia
- County: Whitfield
- Elevation: 929 ft (283 m)
- Time zone: UTC-5 (Eastern (EST))
  - Summer (DST): UTC-4 (EDT)
- ZIP code: 30710
- GNIS feature ID: 353463

Mount Vernon is an unincorporated community in Whitfield County, in the U.S. state of Georgia.

== History ==
The first permanent settlement at Mount Vernon was made in 1830.
