= Phoenix High School (Whitfield County, Georgia) =

Public high school in Whitfield County, Georgia, United States

Coordinates: 34.7831°N 84.9214°W

Location
- 2818 Airport Rd. Dalton postal address, Georgia 30720; United States

Information
- School type: Public, high school
- Established: 1990
- School board: Whitfield County School District
- Superintendent: Judy Gildreath
- Principal: Mrs. Travisano
- Staff: 10.30 (FTE)
- Grades: 9-12
- Enrollment: 185 (2023-2024)
- Student to teacher ratio: 17.96
- Language: English
- Colors: Red and yellow
- Mascot: Phoenix
- Website: Phoenix High School

Phoenix High School is a public high school in the Whitfield County School District, located in unincorporated Whitfield County, Georgia, United States. The site has a Dalton postal address.
