= Rocky Face, Georgia =

- unincorporated community
- Location within Georgia
- Coordinates: 34°48′18″N 85°01′39″W
- Country: United States
- State: Georgia
- County: Whitfield
- Elevation: 771 ft (235 m)
- Time zone: UTC-5 (Eastern (EST))
  - Summer (DST): UTC-4 (EDT)
- ZIP code: 30740
- GNIS feature ID: 332893

Rocky Face is an unincorporated community in the U.S. state of Georgia, located in Whitfield County. Its ZIP Code is 30740.

== History ==
A post office was established at Rocky Face in 1890. The community was named for a nearby rock formation which resembled a human face.

== See also ==
- Battle of Rocky Face Ridge
