= Coahulla Creek High School =

Coordinates: 34°53′59″N 84°54′56″W

Location
- 3361 Crow Rd. Dalton, Georgia 30721; United States

Information
- School type: Public, high school
- Established: 2011
- School board: Whitfield County School District
- Superintendent: Mike Ewton
- Principal: Tracy Mardis
- Staff: 56.50 (FTE)
- Grades: 9-12
- Enrollment: 1,021 (2023-2024)
- Student to teacher ratio: 18.07
- Language: English
- Colors: Blue and silver
- Mascot: Colt
- Rival: North Murray High School
- Website: Coahulla Creek High School

Coahulla Creek High School is a public high school in unincorporated Whitfield County, Georgia, United States. The site has a Dalton postal address. It is in the Whitfield County School District.

The school colors are navy blue and silver, and the mascot is the Colts. The school is in Class AAA of the Georgia High School Association (GHSA), and is located in Dalton.

== History ==
Coahulla Creek High School opened in August 2011 with 754 students in grades nine through twelve. In the spring of 2012, CCHS graduated 12 seniors.

== Academics ==
Students can take College Prep (CP), Honors, Advanced Placement (AP), and Dual enrollment classes.

== Feeder schools ==
Coahulla Creek High School's feeder school is North Whitfield Middle School.

== Athletics ==
Coahulla Creek fields 21 different varsity level teams (11 men's and 10 women's).

- Men's sports: Archery, baseball, basketball, cross country, football, golf, soccer, swimming, tennis, track and field, and wrestling
- Women's sports: Archery, basketball, competition cheerleading, cross country, golf, soccer, swimming, tennis, track and field, and volleyball

== Fine arts ==
Fine arts at Coahulla Creek consist of choral, band, art, and drama departments.
