= Dalton High School (Georgia) =

Public high school in Dalton, Georgia, United States

Location
- 1500 Manly St. Dalton, Georgia 30720; United States; 34.7791°N 84.9867°W

Information
- School type: Public school (government funded), high school
- School district: Dalton Public Schools
- NCES District ID: 1301620
- Superintendent: Steven Craft
- CEEB code: 110970
- NCES School ID: 130162000786
- Principal: Jim Wickes (Interim)
- Teaching staff: 113.30 (on an FTE basis)
- Grades: 9–12
- Enrollment: 1,919 (2024-2025)
  - Grade 9: 475
  - Grade 10: 474
  - Grade 11: 496
  - Grade 12: 474
- Student to teacher ratio: 16.94
- Campus: City: small
- Colors: Red and White
- Mascot: Catamount
- Website: dhs.daltonpublicschools.com

Dalton High School is a public high school located in Dalton, Georgia, United States. It is one of three high schools operated by Dalton Public Schools.

In 2003 about 46% of the students were Hispanic or Latino, reflecting immigration from Mexico into Dalton that began in the 1990s. In 2012 Hispanics and Latinos still maintained a plurality.

== Notable alumni ==
- Jim Arnold, punter in the National Football League
- Charlie Bethel, Georgia state Supreme Court justice
- Mitchell Boggs, professional Major League Baseball player
- Susan P. Coppedge, United States Ambassador-at-Large to Monitor and Combat Trafficking in Persons
- Jahmyr Gibbs, football running back for the Detroit Lions
- Bennet Hundt, German professional basketball player
- Bill Mayo, All-American football player
- Kyric McGowan, professional football player for the Washington Commanders
- Deborah Norville, television personality
- William Ragsdale Cannon, Bishop in the United Methodist Church
