= Dalton, Georgia =

- City
- City of Dalton
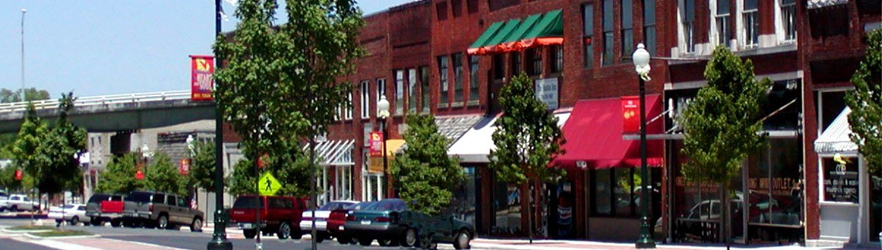
- Downtown Dalton

- Flag Seal
- Nickname: Carpet Capital of the World
- Location in Whitfield County and the state of Georgia

- Location in the United States
- Coordinates: 34°46′16″N 84°58′18″W
- Country: United States
- State: Georgia
- County: Whitfield

Government
  - Mayor: Annalee Sams

Area
  - City: 21.16 sq mi (54.80 km^{2})
  - Land: 21.14 sq mi (54.76 km^{2})
  - Water: 0.015 sq mi (0.04 km^{2})
- Elevation: 761 ft (232 m)

Population (2020)
  - City: 34,417
  - Density: 1,627.9/sq mi (628.52/km^{2})
  - Urban: 102,599
  - Metro: 142,227
- Time zone: UTC-5 (Eastern (EST))
  - Summer (DST): UTC-4 (EDT)
- ZIP codes: 30719-30722
- Area codes: 706/762
- FIPS code: 13-21380
- GNIS feature ID: 0355424
- HDI (2021): 0.861 – very high
- Website: daltonga.gov

Dalton is a city and the county seat of Whitfield County, Georgia, United States. It is also the principal city of the Dalton Metropolitan Statistical Area, which encompasses all of Murray and Whitfield counties.

As of the 2020 census, the city had a population of 34,417 people; the city's metro area was 124,837. Dalton is located just off Interstate 75 in the foothills of the Blue Ridge Mountains in northwest Georgia and is the second-largest city in northwest Georgia, after Rome.

Dalton is home to many of the nation's floor-covering manufacturers, primarily those producing carpet, rugs, and vinyl flooring. It is home to the Dalton Convention Center, which showcases the Georgia Athletic Coaches' Hall of Fame and hosts a variety of events.

== Geography ==
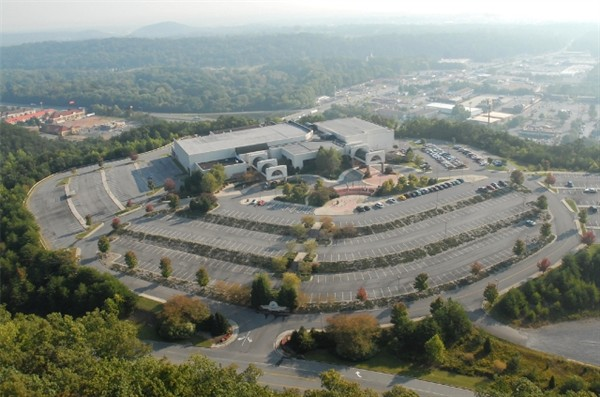
Dalton Convention Center

Dalton is located at (34.771088, -84.971553). According to the United States Census Bureau, the city has a total area of 19.8 square miles (51 km^{2}), of which 19.8 square miles (51 km^{2}) is land and 0.04 square miles (0.10 km^{2}) (0.10%) is water.

== Quality of life ==
Dalton promotes a quality of life that combines natural amenities, community traditions, and ongoing revitalization projects. The city maintains more than 20 public parks and playgrounds, as well as access to regional hiking and biking trails such as Rocky Face Ridge, Disney Trail, and Haig Mill Lake Park. The Discover Dalton Pass, launched in 2025, offers residents and visitors a digital guide to trails, outdoor recreation, and cultural attractions across Whitfield County.

Civic engagement is an established feature of community life. Events such as Gratefull Dalton—an annual community-wide Thanksgiving meal that draws more than 2,000 attendees—highlight Dalton's emphasis on social connection and inclusivity. Monthly “CommUNITY dinners,” launched in 2024, further aim to build relationships and generate dialogue among residents.

Downtown revitalization efforts, supported by public-private partnerships, have included streetscape improvements, new public art, and corridor beautification projects. A $2.2 million state grant in 2023 helped complete improvements on Cuyler and Pentz Streets, strengthening the walkability and visual appeal of the central business district.

Cultural life is supported by local music festivals, outdoor concert series, and storytelling campaigns such as People of Dalton, which highlight diverse resident experiences. Educational and literacy programs, including bilingual book distribution and summer reading events, contribute to community enrichment and early childhood development.

== Demographics ==
Historical population
| Census | Pop. | Note | %± |
|---|---|---|---|
| 1860 | 1,649 | | — |
| 1870 | 1,809 | | 9.7% |
| 1880 | 2,516 | | 39.1% |
| 1890 | 3,046 | | 21.1% |
| 1900 | 4,315 | | 41.7% |
| 1910 | 5,324 | | 23.4% |
| 1920 | 5,222 | | −1.9% |
| 1930 | 8,160 | | 56.3% |
| 1940 | 10,448 | | 28.0% |
| 1950 | 15,968 | | 52.8% |
| 1960 | 17,868 | | 11.9% |
| 1970 | 18,872 | | 5.6% |
| 1980 | 20,939 | | 11.0% |
| 1990 | 21,761 | | 3.9% |
| 2000 | 27,912 | | 28.3% |
| 2010 | 33,128 | | 18.7% |
| 2020 | 34,417 | | 3.9% |
| 2025 (est.) | 35,322 | ▲ | 2.6% |
U.S. Decennial Census; 2025

=== Racial and ethnic composition ===
Dalton city, Georgia – Racial and ethnic composition Note: the US Census treats Hispanic/Latino as an ethnic category. This table excludes Latinos from the racial categories and assigns them to a separate category. Hispanics/Latinos may be of any race.
| Race / Ethnicity (NH = Non-Hispanic) | Pop 2000 | Pop 2010 | Pop 2020 | % 2000 | % 2010 | % 2020 |
|---|---|---|---|---|---|---|
| White alone (NH) | 13,867 | 14,055 | 13,029 | 49.68% | 42.43% | 37.86% |
| Black or African American alone (NH) | 2,042 | 1,974 | 2,108 | 7.32% | 5.96% | 6.12% |
| Native American or Alaska Native alone (NH) | 45 | 41 | 48 | 0.16% | 0.12% | 0.14% |
| Asian alone (NH) | 458 | 749 | 859 | 1.64% | 2.26% | 2.50% |
| Native Hawaiian or Pacific Islander alone (NH) | 13 | 12 | 7 | 0.05% | 0.04% | 0.02% |
| Other race alone (NH) | 19 | 24 | 107 | 0.07% | 0.07% | 0.31% |
| Mixed race or Multiracial (NH) | 249 | 382 | 759 | 0.89% | 1.15% | 2.21% |
| Hispanic or Latino (any race) | 11,219 | 15,891 | 17,500 | 40.19% | 47.97% | 50.85% |
| Total | 27,912 | 33,128 | 34,417 | 100.00% | 100.00% | 100.00% |

=== 2020 census ===
As of the 2020 census, 34,417 people, 12,046 households, and 7,470 families were residing in the city.

About 99.0% of residents lived in urban areas, while 1.0% lived in rural areas.

The median age was 33.7 years; 26.9% of residents were under 18 and 13.1% were 65 or older. For every 100 females, there were 96.3 males, and for every 100 females 18 and over, there were 93.2 males 18 and over.

Of the 12,046 households, 37.7% had children under 18 living in them, 41.9% were married couples, 20.5% had a male householder and no spouse or partner present, and 30.9% had a female householder and no spouse or partner present. About 27.5% of all households were made up of individuals, and 10.5% had someone living alone who was 65 or older.

Of the 13,010 housing units, 7.4% were vacant. The homeowner vacancy rate was 1.4% and the rental vacancy rate was 6.9%.

Racial composition as of the 2020 census
| Race | Number | Percent |
|---|---|---|
| White | 15,864 | 46.1% |
| Black or African American | 2,232 | 6.5% |
| American Indian and Alaska Native | 1,126 | 3.3% |
| Asian | 876 | 2.5% |
| Native Hawaiian and 0ther Pacific Islander | 20 | 0.1% |
| Some other race | 8,878 | 25.8% |
| Two or more races | 5,421 | 15.8% |

=== 2010 census ===
According to the 2010 census, Dalton had a population of 33,128 living in 11,337 households. The racial and ethnic composition of the population was 42.4% non-Hispanic white, 22.6% Hispanic, 6.4% black, 0.6% Native American, 2.4% Asian, 0.1% Pacific Islander, 0.1% non-Hispanic reporting some other race, 22.2% Hispanic reporting some other race, and 3.2% reporting two or more races. About 48.0% of the population was Hispanic or Latino.

=== 2000 census ===
According to the census estimate of 2006, 33,604 people, 10,689 households, and 8,511 families were residing in the city. The population density was 1,408.3 inhabitants per square mile (543.7/km^{2}). The 11,229 housing units had an average density of 516.0 units per square mile (199.2 units/km^{2}). The racial makeup of the city was 20% White, 22% Black, 1% Native American, 1% Asian, 1% Pacific Islander, 21.15% from other races, and 6% from two or more races. Hispanics or Latinos of any race were 50% of the population.

Of the 9,689 households, 34.3% had children under 18 living with them, 49.9% were married couples living together, 11.5% had a female householder with no husband present, and 32.8% were not families. About 27.6% of all households were made up of individuals, and 10.8% had someone living alone who was 65 or older. The average household size was 2.81, and the average family size was 3.43.

In the city, the age distribution was 27.3% under 18, 12.0% from 18 to 24, 30.3% from 25 to 44, 18.9% from 45 to 64, and 11.5% who were 65 or older. The median age was 31 years. For every 100 females, there were 104.0 males. For every 100 females 18 and over, there were 101.6 males.

In the city, the median income for a household was $34,312 and for a family was $41,111. Males had a median income of $28,158 versus $23,701 for females. The per capita income for the city was $20,575. About 11.9% of families and 16.0% of the population were below the poverty line, including 19.0% of those under 18 and 8.9% of those 65 or over. After the lay-offs, companies like Mohawk Industries paid workers with 20 years' seniority a "small severance package."

=== Mexican Americans ===
In the 1990s, Mexicans began to immigrate to Dalton to work at carpet factories. By 2010, 48% of Dalton's 33,000 residents were Latino, comprising a plurality of all residents. During the late 1980s economic boom – when demand for carpet-mill laborers reached an all-time high – the 320 carpet mills aggressively recruited Latino workers. As of 2012, Hispanics constituted the plurality of students at Dalton High School. In 2024 multiple churches, restaurants, and home decorations reflected the bicultural ties.

== Climate ==
Dalton has a humid subtropical climate (Cfa), with hot, humid summers, and mild to cool winters, and straddles the border between USDA Hardiness Zones 7B and 8A. The monthly daily mean temperature ranges from 41.0 °F (5.0 °C) in January to 79.1 °F (26.2 °C) in July; on average, there are 37.9 days of 90 °F (32 °C)+ highs, 2.0 days where the high fails to reach above freezing, and 62.6 nights where the low falls to or below 32 °F (0 °C) annually.

Climate data for Dalton, Georgia, 1991–2020 normals, extremes 1935–2005
| Month | Jan | Feb | Mar | Apr | May | Jun | Jul | Aug | Sep | Oct | Nov | Dec | Year |
|---|---|---|---|---|---|---|---|---|---|---|---|---|---|
| Record high °F (°C) | 79 (26) | 79 (26) | 87 (31) | 91 (33) | 99 (37) | 103 (39) | 103 (39) | 104 (40) | 102 (39) | 94 (34) | 87 (31) | 78 (26) | 104 (40) |
| Mean daily maximum °F (°C) | 51.1 (10.6) | 55.2 (12.9) | 64.5 (18.1) | 72.8 (22.7) | 79.7 (26.5) | 86.1 (30.1) | 89.3 (31.8) | 89.5 (31.9) | 84.1 (28.9) | 74.6 (23.7) | 62.6 (17.0) | 54.2 (12.3) | 72.0 (22.2) |
| Daily mean °F (°C) | 41.0 (5.0) | 44.5 (6.9) | 52.5 (11.4) | 60.3 (15.7) | 68.3 (20.2) | 75.8 (24.3) | 79.1 (26.2) | 79.0 (26.1) | 73.0 (22.8) | 61.9 (16.6) | 51.2 (10.7) | 43.9 (6.6) | 60.9 (16.0) |
| Mean daily minimum °F (°C) | 31.0 (−0.6) | 33.8 (1.0) | 40.5 (4.7) | 47.8 (8.8) | 57.0 (13.9) | 65.3 (18.5) | 69.0 (20.6) | 68.4 (20.2) | 61.9 (16.6) | 49.3 (9.6) | 39.7 (4.3) | 33.6 (0.9) | 49.8 (9.9) |
| Record low °F (°C) | −10 (−23) | −1 (−18) | 7 (−14) | 24 (−4) | 33 (1) | 42 (6) | 51 (11) | 51 (11) | 32 (0) | 23 (−5) | 12 (−11) | −4 (−20) | −10 (−23) |
| Average precipitation inches (mm) | 5.18 (132) | 4.90 (124) | 4.99 (127) | 4.04 (103) | 4.12 (105) | 4.68 (119) | 5.23 (133) | 4.00 (102) | 4.89 (124) | 3.52 (89) | 4.93 (125) | 4.85 (123) | 55.33 (1,406) |
| Average snowfall inches (cm) | 0.9 (2.3) | 0.5 (1.3) | 1.0 (2.5) | 0.1 (0.25) | 0.0 (0.0) | 0.0 (0.0) | 0.0 (0.0) | 0.0 (0.0) | 0.0 (0.0) | 0.0 (0.0) | 0.0 (0.0) | 0.0 (0.0) | 2.5 (6.35) |
| Average precipitation days (≥ 0.01 in) | 8.7 | 8.6 | 9.3 | 8.2 | 8.3 | 9.7 | 9.8 | 8.1 | 7.1 | 6.3 | 8.6 | 8.5 | 101.2 |
| Average snowy days (≥ 0.1 in) | 0.5 | 0.2 | 0.1 | 0.0 | 0.0 | 0.0 | 0.0 | 0.0 | 0.0 | 0.0 | 0.0 | 0.0 | 0.8 |
Source 1: NOAA (precip/precip days, snow/snow days 1981–2010)
Source 2: XMACIS2

== Sports ==
=== Soccer ===
In 2018, the USL League Two awarded a soccer franchise to Dalton. The Dalton Red Wolves SC's inaugural season was in 2019; the club plays at Lakeshore Park in Dalton. According to the New York Times, "this town of nearly 35,000 — now 53 percent Hispanic — became an unlikely center for America’s slow tilt toward soccer and why it now calls itself Soccer Town U.S.A. It may not be as chest-puffing as the title of “home to more millionaires per capita than any other city in the United States,” which Dalton held in the 1970s. Dalton recently broke ground on a soccer complex featuring two FIFA-regulation-size turf fields."

== Arts and culture ==
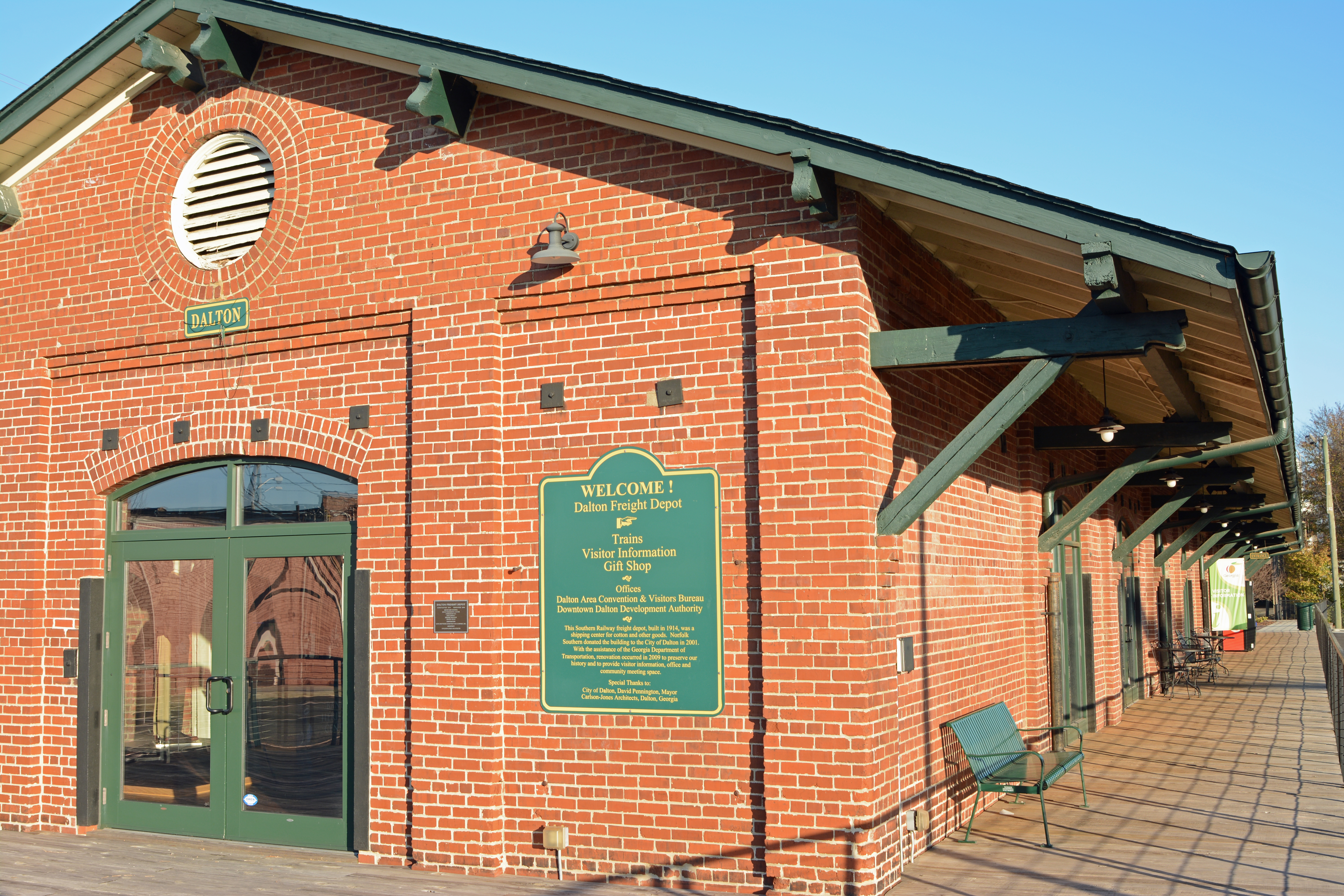
Visitor's information center

=== Creative Arts Guild ===
The Creative Arts Guild is the oldest multidisciplinary community arts center in Georgia. Founded in 1963 by a group of civic leaders, the Creative Arts Guild began as a grass-roots community movement originally housed in the Old Firehouse on Pentz Street in historic Downtown Dalton. The Guild began offering art, music, dance, and theatre classes, as well as gallery shows and exhibitions. As programming and class attendance grew, plans for a larger facility were developed. In 1981, the guild moved to its permanent home at 520 West Waugh Street. The vision of that small group of patrons has grown into an organization that now houses four educational departments (visual art, dance, gymnastics, and music), as well as the Arts in Education outreach programs, events, gallery exhibits, music and dance concerts and recitals, and it acts as a hub of culture for Northwest Georgia and Southeast Tennessee.

=== Artistic Civic Theatre ===
Artistic Civic Theatre has served the Northwest Georgia community for 24 years and has reached thousands of citizens through major musical, comedy, and drama productions, ACT2 (the children's wing), student productions in cooperation with schools in Dalton, Whitfield, and Murray Counties, touring productions of original adaptations of classic fairy tales, theatrical arts classes co-sponsored with the Creative Arts Guild, the annual Youth Theatre Camp, and the Studio Cabaret live music series. ACT's programs are funded through individual and family memberships, as well as corporate sponsorships and donations.

=== Dalton Little Theatre ===
Dalton Little Theatre held its first documented performance in 1869. The organization began as the Dalton Amateurs and continued as the Sophoclean Dramatic Club and the Dalton Players, before becoming Dalton Little Theatre in 1955. The theatre has performed continuously except for breaks during World War I and World War II. The organization formally incorporated in 1958 and found its first home in 1981, when it converted the former firehouse built in 1888 into the Firehouse Theatre. The Firehouse Theatre is often referred to as the Old Dalton Firehouse, and it remains the home of Dalton Little Theatre to this day.

=== Other events ===
The Downtown Dalton Development Authority hosts a number of events throughout the year, including the Downtown Dalton Farmers Market (May–August), a Downtown Sampler, and an annual Beer Festival. The Dalton Area Convention and Visitors Bureau partners with the DDDA to host the Downtown Dalton Summer Concert Series, featuring local bands. The Young Professionals of Northwest Georgia host a monthly social event to connect and engage area young professionals

== History ==
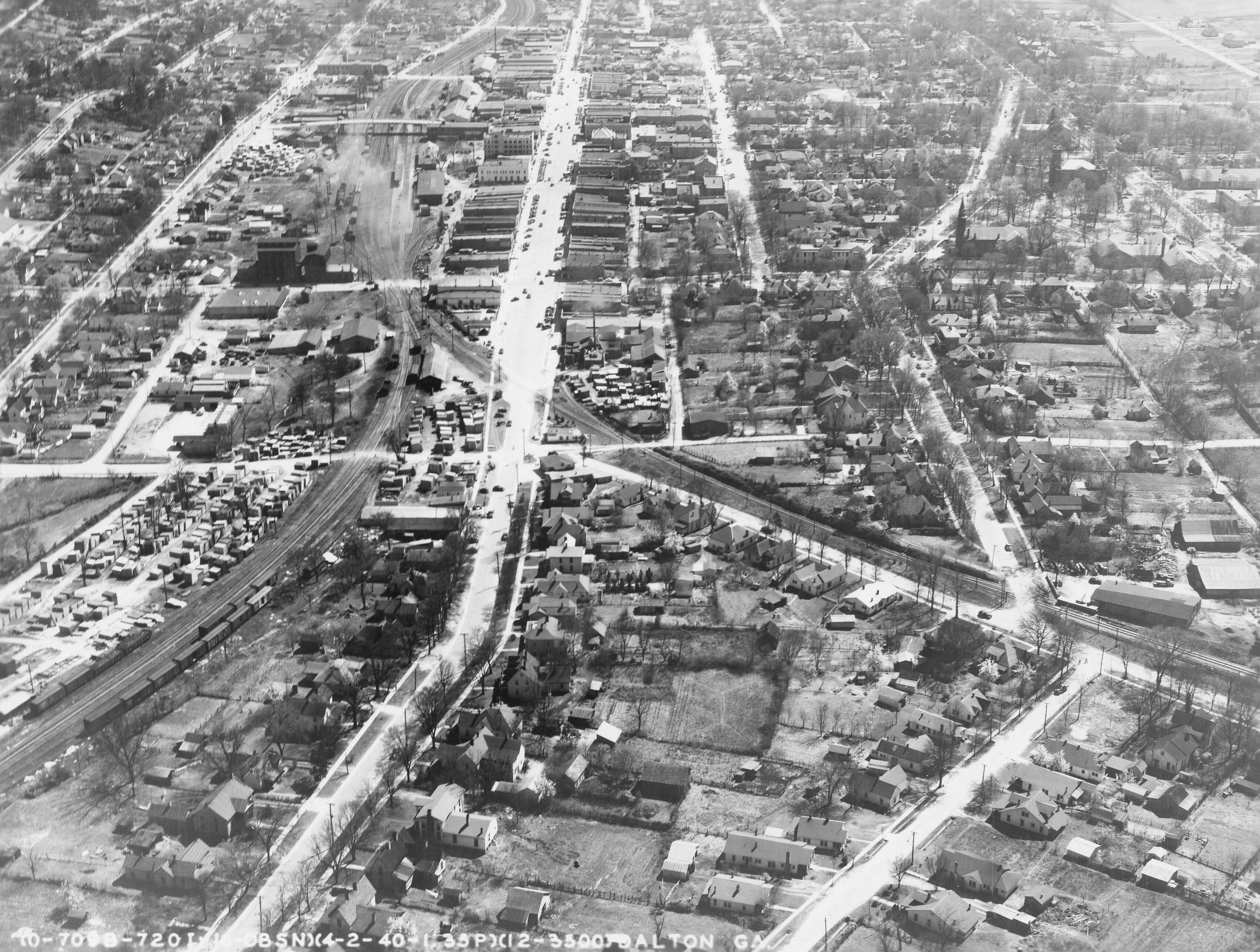
View of Dalton, 1940

=== Pre-history ===
Woodland Indians and Creek Nation initially held the area of present-day Dalton, Georgia. The first recorded white man in the area was Spanish explorer Hernando de Soto (1540). By the mid-18th century, when the Cherokee forced the Creek Nation out of their homelands, to the west and south, the Cherokee Indians called the mountains of north Georgia their "Enchanted Land" until their own forced removal in 1838.

=== Industrialization ===
By the time the last Cherokees were removed from the land, work was underway for a railroad, the Western and Atlantic Railroad (W&A), to join the Tennessee River with the Georgia Railroad then under construction. In 1847, Dalton was defined as a mile radius from the city center, the Western and Atlantic Depot. The final segment of this pivotal railway was completed in Tunnel Hill, Whitfield County in 1850. A second railroad, East Tennessee and Georgia, was completed in 1852.

Catherine Evans Whitener's revitalization of the pre-Civil War-era craft of candlewicking gave rise to a cottage chenille bedspread industry. Homes along U.S. Highway 41 displayed brightly patterned homemade bedspreads on front yard clotheslines in hopes of luring tourists into a purchase. The stretch of highway passing through Whitfield County became known colloquially as "Peacock Alley" in reference to one of the most common patterns depicted on the bedspreads. The bedspread business boomed to a multimillion-dollar industry by the 1950s, and from this early origin, the carpet tufting industry grew in Dalton after Glenn Looper developed an adaptation that allowed the mechanism used to tuft yarn into muslin or cotton for bedspreads to tuft into jute, shifting the nation's carpet manufacturers from woven wool products in the northeast to tufted synthetic carpets in northwest Georgia. Today, carpet mills remain the region's major employers and economic drivers.

Dalton was named for Edward Dalton White.

=== Civil War ===
During the Civil War, the city of Dalton saw its first action during the Great Locomotive Chase, on April 12, 1862. More than a year later, on September 18–20, 1863, massive Union and Confederate forces battled a few miles west of Dalton at the Battle of Chickamauga, and later during the Chattanooga campaign. The war came to Whitfield County at the First Battle of Dalton, a series of skirmishes between February 22 and February 27, 1864, during which Union Major General George H. Thomas probed Confederate General Joseph E. Johnston's Army of Tennessee to determine if the loss of two full divisions to reinforce Confederate forces elsewhere had made the Army of Tennessee vulnerable to Union attack. Johnston's forces held and Thomas withdrew to Chattanooga. At the beginning of the Atlanta campaign, the Battle of Rocky Face Ridge and Dug Gap began on May 7, 1864, and ended when Johnston completed the withdrawal of his forces from Dalton on May 12. The Second Battle of Dalton occurred during the Atlanta campaign on August 14–15, 1864.

In John Bell Hood's Tennessee campaign, soldiers of Major General Samuel G. French's Division of Lieutenant General Alexander Stewart's Corps of the Confederate Army of Tennessee attacked a Union blockhouse in Tilton before passing through Dalton and heading west.

The U.S. government recently declared Dalton and Whitfield County to have more intact Civil War artifacts than any other place in the country. Also of interest is the site of the historic Western & Atlantic Railroad Station; one of the few still standing and restored to its original architectural state, this site used to be the location of the Dalton Depot Restaurant (closed since 2015). The steel center marker for the original surveying of the city of Dalton is still inside the depot.

=== Modern history ===
The A. D. Strickland Store was once a rural county store, built c. 1878, and is now part of the National Register of Historic Places.

The Bohannon Gang was arrested in Dalton on August 27, 1897. The gang of "car thieves" were believed to have been robbing area cargo trains for about a decade before their capture, and were accused of over $100,000 in cargo theft, now over $3.7 million today. Led by Hiram Walter Bohannon, the gang's trial was quickly followed by the "merchant's trials" in which many Dalton area businessmen were accused and convicted of receiving stolen goods. The trial was widely publicized and even appeared in the October 24, 1897, issue of The New York Times. The ring leaders were sentenced to the Cole City Convict Camp, in Cole City, Georgia. The last to be released was Hiram Walter Bohannon, in 1903, after receiving a pardon from Joseph M. Terrell.

== Carpet industry ==
Dalton is often referred to as the "Carpet Capital of the World," home to over 150 carpet plants. The industry employs more than 30,000 people in the Whitfield County area. More than 90% of the functional carpet produced in the world today is made within a 65-mile (105 km) radius of the city.

The agglomeration of the carpet industry in Dalton can be traced back to a wedding gift given in 1895 by a teenage girl, Catherine Evans Whitener, to her brother, Henry Alexander Evans, and his bride, Elizabeth Cramer. The gift was an unusual tufted bedspread. Copying a quilt pattern, she sewed thick cotton yarns with a running stitch into unbleached muslin, clipped the ends of the yarn so they would fluff out, and finally, washed the spread in hot water to hold the yarns by shrinking the fabric. Interest grew in young Catherine's bedspreads, and in 1900, she made the first sale of a spread for $2.50. Demand for the spreads became so great that by the 1930s, local women had "haulers," who would take the stamped sheeting and yarns to front porch workers. Often entire families worked to hand-tuft the spreads for 10 to 25 cents per spread. Nearly 10,000 area cottage "tufters," men, women, and children were involved in the industry. Income generated by the bedspreads was instrumental in helping many area families survive the Depression. Chenille bedspreads became popular all over the country and provided a new name for Dalton: the Bedspread Capital of the World.

When a form of mechanized carpet making was developed after World War II, Dalton became the center of the new industry because specialized tufting skills were required and the city had a ready pool of workers with those skills.

By the 1970s manufacturers had begun to develop techniques to move from plain tufted carpet to sculpted carpet. Improved patterning, stain and wear resistance, and colors have made the modern tufted carpet the choice for functional carpet for the vast majority of homes and moved woven carpet to a decorative role.

By the 1990s carpet scraps had made up 60% of the area's waste, and a balefill site called the Carpet Landfill was created to accommodate the unique issue. It currently stores over 500,000 tons of baled carpet.

From June 2011 to June 2012 as carpet mills that had employed thousands restructured, downsized, cut back productivity and closed, Dalton lost 4,600 jobs—according to the U.S. Labor Department—making it the city with the worst job loss in the United States.

The city's unemployment rate has since dipped to as low as 5.5%.

== Solar industry ==
Dalton is poised for a remarkable transformation as it emerges as a leader in the solar industry. This shift began in 2019 when Hanwha Qcells, one of the world's largest solar panel manufacturers, opened a massive factory in Dalton, employing 750 people to produce an impressive 1.7 GW of solar panels. This facility stands as the largest solar manufacturing site in the Western Hemisphere.

The initial investment significantly boosted local employment, and subsequent expansion plans by Qcells have promised even more growth. On October 18, 2023, Qcells completed expansions that added an additional 2 GW of solar capacity, increasing the factory's total output to over 5.1 GW and creating 510 new jobs in solar manufacturing.

Today, Qcells’ Dalton factory operates as a powerhouse, producing nearly 30,000 solar panels daily and solidifying its position as the fourth-largest manufacturer in Dalton, trailing only three established flooring giants.

This growth has been supported by Sen. Jon Ossoff's Solar Energy Manufacturing for America Act, which was passed by the U.S. House of Representatives on November 19, 2021. This legislation provides tax credits to American manufacturers across the entire solar supply chain, from polysilicon production to fully assembled solar modules. By encouraging local manufacturing in the solar sector, the act aims to strengthen Georgia's renewable energy infrastructure, reduce dependence on imports, create local jobs, and contribute to broader green economy goals in the United States.

The shift towards solar energy presents Dalton with an opportunity to diversify its economy, potentially cultivating a new generation of Daltonians employed in the clean energy sector.

== Government and politics ==
=== Election results ===
Presidential elections results in the City of Dalton
| Year | Democratic | Republican | Others |
|---|---|---|---|
| 2020 | 44.46% 3,976 | 54.12% 4,839 | 1.42% 127 |
| 2016 | 40.26% 3,015 | 55.99% 4,193 | 3.75% 281 |
| 2012 | 37.01% 2,504 | 61.93% 4,190 | 1.06% 72 |

== Environmental problems ==
Dalton's carpet production has taken up to one-third of the Conasauga River summer water flow. The river and city water supply has been contaminated with perfluorinated compounds used to make carpets stain-resistant. Dalton Utilities' has processed wastewater using a land application system, that spread effluent on more than 9,000 forested acres (36 km^{2}) in an area called Looper's Bend. Runoff was found to drip down into the river.

== Education ==
=== Public schools ===
The Dalton City School District, which covers the entire city of Dalton, serves preschool to grade twelve, and consists of six elementary schools, a middle school, and two high schools. The district has 366 full-time teachers and over 5,739 students.

- Blue Ridge Elementary School
- Brookwood Elementary School
- City Park Elementary School
- Park Creek Elementary School
- Roan Elementary School
- Westwood Elementary School
- Hammond Creek Middle School
- Dalton Junior High School
- The Dalton Academy
- Dalton High School

The Whitfield County School District serves areas outside of the Dalton city limits, even if they have "Dalton, GA" postal addresses. Coahulla Creek High School, Phoenix High School, and Southeast Whitfield High School have Dalton postal addresses but lie outside of the city limits and serve areas not within the city limits.

Charter schools

- Whitfield County Career Academy

Alternative schools

- Fort Hill Complex (Crossroads Academy)

=== Independent schools ===
- Christian Heritage School

=== Higher education ===
- Dalton State College – Main Campus
- Georgia Northwestern Technical College (Whitfield/Murray Campus)

== Infrastructure ==
=== Air ===
Dalton Municipal Airport, a general aviation airport, lacking scheduled commercial flights, is southeast of the city. Commercial airports are in Chattanooga to the north and Atlanta to the south.

=== Rail ===
The Southern Railway had two Cincinnati-to-Florida named trains, Ponce de Leon (Cincinnati to Florida via Lexington, Chattanooga and Atlanta) and Royal Palm (Cincinnati to Florida via Lexington, Chattanooga and Atlanta) that made stops in the town into the 1960s. The Louisville and Nashville Railroad's Dixie Flagler (Chicago and St. Louis to Florida), Dixie Flyer (Chicago and St. Louis to Florida) and Georgian (Chicago and St. Louis to Atlanta) also made stops in Dalton. The last train was an unnamed L&N Evansville, Indiana - Atlanta, Georgia remnant of the Georgian, ending service on April 30, 1971.

=== Roads ===
Interstate 75 runs a short distance west of the city. The modern U.S. Route 41 and U.S. Route 76 circumvent Dalton, but historically they ran through the city. Georgia State Route 52 runs through the city's downtown.

== Notable people ==
- Morris Almond, professional basketball player
- Jim Arnold, former NFL punter
- Mitchell Boggs, former professional baseball player
- William Ragsdale Cannon, Bishop of the United Methodist Church and Dean of Candler School of Theology at Emory University
- Lane Davies, American actor
- Susan Dennard, author of The Witchlands series
- Eddie Dwight, baseball player in the Negro leagues
- Jahmyr Gibbs, NFL running back for the Detroit Lions
- Bobby Gill, NASCAR driver
- Stephen E. Gordy, Virginia politician
- Andy Foster, California State Athletic Commissioner
- Will N. Harben, Author
- John Junkins, professor and former interim president of Texas A&M University
- Tammy Jo Kirk, NASCAR driver
- Robert Loveman, poet
- Marla Maples, actress and former wife of Donald Trump (native of nearby Cohutta)
- Harlan Erwin Mitchell, United States representative from Georgia
- Deborah Norville, television anchor and journalist
- Steve Prohm, head men's basketball coach at Iowa State University
- Harry Leon "Suitcase" Simpson, African American major league baseball player
- Marian McCamy Sims, author
- Dale Singleton, motorcycle racer
- Linda Vaughn, Miss Hurst Shifter
- Donny Lloyd, guitarist of pop rock band, Honey Revenge

== Sister cities ==
- Dilbeek, Belgium

== See also ==
- National Register of Historic Places listings in Whitfield County, Georgia
