= Georgia State Route 225 =

State highway in Georgia, United States

State Route 225
- SR 225 highlighted in red

Route information
- Maintained by GDOT
- Length: 36.1 mi (58.1 km)
- Existed: 1943–present

Major junctions
- South end: US 41 / SR 3 in Calhoun
- I-75 northeast of Calhoun; SR 136 in Nicklesville; SR 52 Alt. in Spring Place; US 76 / SR 52 north of Spring Place; SR 286 west of Eton; SR 2 in Gregory
- North end: SR 74 at the Tennessee state line, north of Gregory

Location
- Country: United States
- State: Georgia
- Counties: Gordon, Murray

Highway system
- Georgia State Highway System; Interstate; US; State; Special
← SR 224	→ SR 226

State Route 225 (SR 225) is a 36.1-mile-long (58.1 km) north–south state highway that traverses through the northwestern part of the U.S. state of Georgia. It travels through portions of Gordon and Murray counties. It is the most direct route for citizens of Murray County to reach Calhoun, Interstate 75 (I-75), and Cleveland, Tennessee.

== Route description ==
=== Gordon County ===
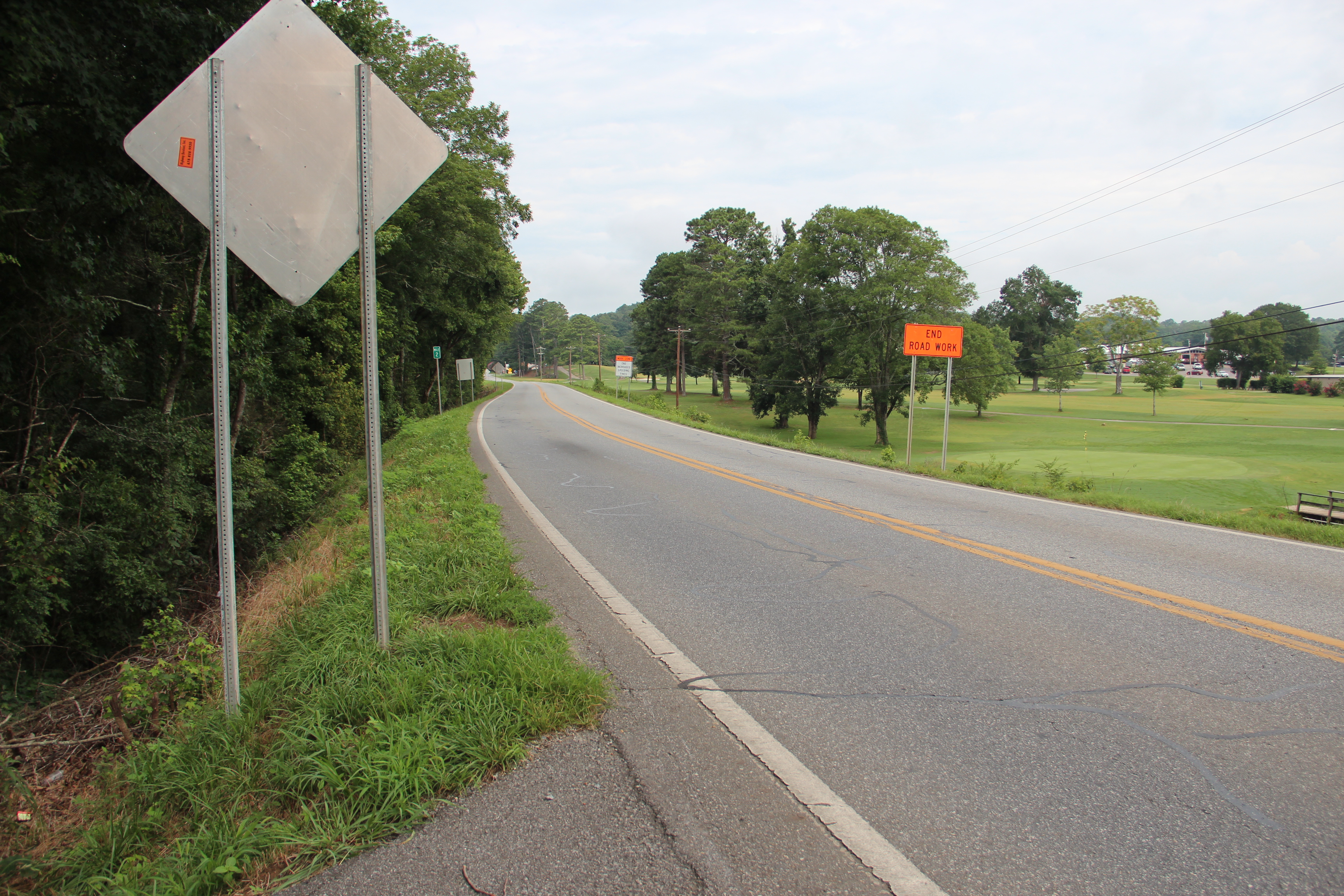
Georgia State Route 225 near New Echota

SR 225 begins in the northeastern part of Calhoun, spurring off of U.S. Route 41 (US 41) at an intersection in central Gordon County. It heads southeast for approximately 72 feet (22 m) before turning northeast. It has an interchange with I-75. Crossing over the Coosawattee River, SR 225 winds its way through north-central Gordon County until it intersects SR 136 in the community of Nicklesville. Shortly after, the route crosses into Murray County.

=== Murray County ===
From here SR 225 continues through the rural and largely undeveloped southwestern portion of the county. Its first major intersection in Murray County occurs with SR 52 Alt. in the former county seat of Spring Place. Just after this, it passes the Chief Vann House Historic Site. Approximately 1.5 miles (2.4 km) north of this intersection, SR 225 intersects US 76/SR 52, which travel concurrently. Georgia State Route 286 intersects SR 225 approximately 3.2 miles (5.1 km) north of this intersection. Shortly before entering the unincorporated community of Gregory, SR 225 begins a short currency with SR 2 into town. In Gregory, the two routes split, with SR 225 heading north. It meets its northern terminus when it encounters the Tennessee state line approximately 2.2 miles (3.5 km) north of Gregory. Here, the roadway continues as Tennessee State Route 74.

SR 225 is not part of the National Highway System, a system of routes determined to be the most important for the nation's economy, mobility and defense.

SR 225 is designated as a "Trail of Tears" Highway because of significant cultural remains of the Cherokee Nation along the route. Included is New Echota, the former capital of the Cherokee Nation (and home to the first Native American language newspaper in the United States) and the Chief Vann House Historic Site, site of the former wealthy Cherokee leader, landowner, and businessman Joseph Vann. The capital of New Echota is designated as the official beginning of the "Trail of Tears", the forceful removal of thousands of Native American in the 19th century.

The stretch of SR 225 through southern Murray County between the Gordon County line and four-way stop at Spring Place is an extremely dangerous length of highway, with a plethora of serious motor vehicle accidents, including many fatalities, each year. Reasons for this include excessive speeds by drivers due to the lack of development and multitudes of bad intersections with county roads and private drive-ways. Unfortunately no plans are in the works to four-lane this stretch and driver responsibility will be the only way to ensure this road be taken off a list of one of the most dangerous stretches of highway in the state.

== History ==
SR 225 was established in 1943 along an alignment from Calhoun to Spring Place. In 1953, this section was paved. At the same time, the roadway that would eventually be SR 225 from Spring Place to the Tennessee state line was constructed. By 1960, SR 225 was extended, and paved, along this northern section.

In the past few years, the stretch of SR 225 between US 76/SR 52 and SR 286 has seen explosive development, requiring a new redlight intersection at the junction with SR 286. This is largely due to two new schools (Bagley Middle School and Woodlawn Elementary School) being built near this junction. A four-way stop was recently added at SR 225's intersection with Mt. Carmel Church Road due to congestion from the new North Murray High School (first new high school in the county since the 1930s) and many serious accidents.

== Future ==
The "Four-way" (the local term for the intersection of SR 225 and SR 52 Alternate) has become a site of horrible traffic congestion during morning and evening commutes, causing traffic to sometimes be backed up for over a half-mile (note this may not seem like congestion, but for rural Murray County, this is one of the worst traffic spots). Plans are in the works to construct a "225 by-pass" which will spur off its namesake route near Springdale Estates and run parallel to the west of SR 225, by-passing the "four-way" at Spring Place and continuing until its proposed terminus at US 76/SR 52. However these plans have been on GDOT's drawing board for over 15 years and until recently, these plans were continuously pushed back for higher-priority projects across the state.

== Major intersections ==
County	Location	mi	km	Destinations	Notes
Gordon	Calhoun	0.0	0.0	US 41 / SR 3 – Calhoun, Dalton	Southern terminus
Gordon		1.1	1.8	I-75 (SR 401) – Atlanta, Chattanooga	I-75 exit 317
Gordon	Nickelsville	7.4	11.9	SR 136 (Nickelsville Road) – Resaca	
Murray	Spring Place	19.8	31.9	SR 52 Alt. (Clarence Ridley Parkway) – Dalton, Chatsworth	
Murray		21.2	34.1	US 76 / SR 52 – Dalton, Chatsworth	
Murray		24.4	39.3	SR 286 (George W. Ross Memorial Highway) – Dawnville, Eton	
Murray		32.9	52.9	SR 2 west (Rev. Charles Walter Hayes Memorial Highway) – Ringgold	Southern end of SR 2 concurrency
Murray	Gregory	33.9	54.6	SR 2 east – Cisco	Northern end of SR 2 concurrency
Murray		36.1	58.1	SR 74 north (Spring Place Road SE) – Cleveland	Northern terminus at Tennessee state line
1.000 mi = 1.609 km; 1.000 km = 0.621 mi: Concurrency terminus
