= Nickelsville =

Nickelsville may refer to the following places in the United States:

- Nickelsville, Georgia
- Nickelsville, Virginia

== See also ==
- Nickelville, Texas
