= Marcell Ateman =

American football player (born 1994)

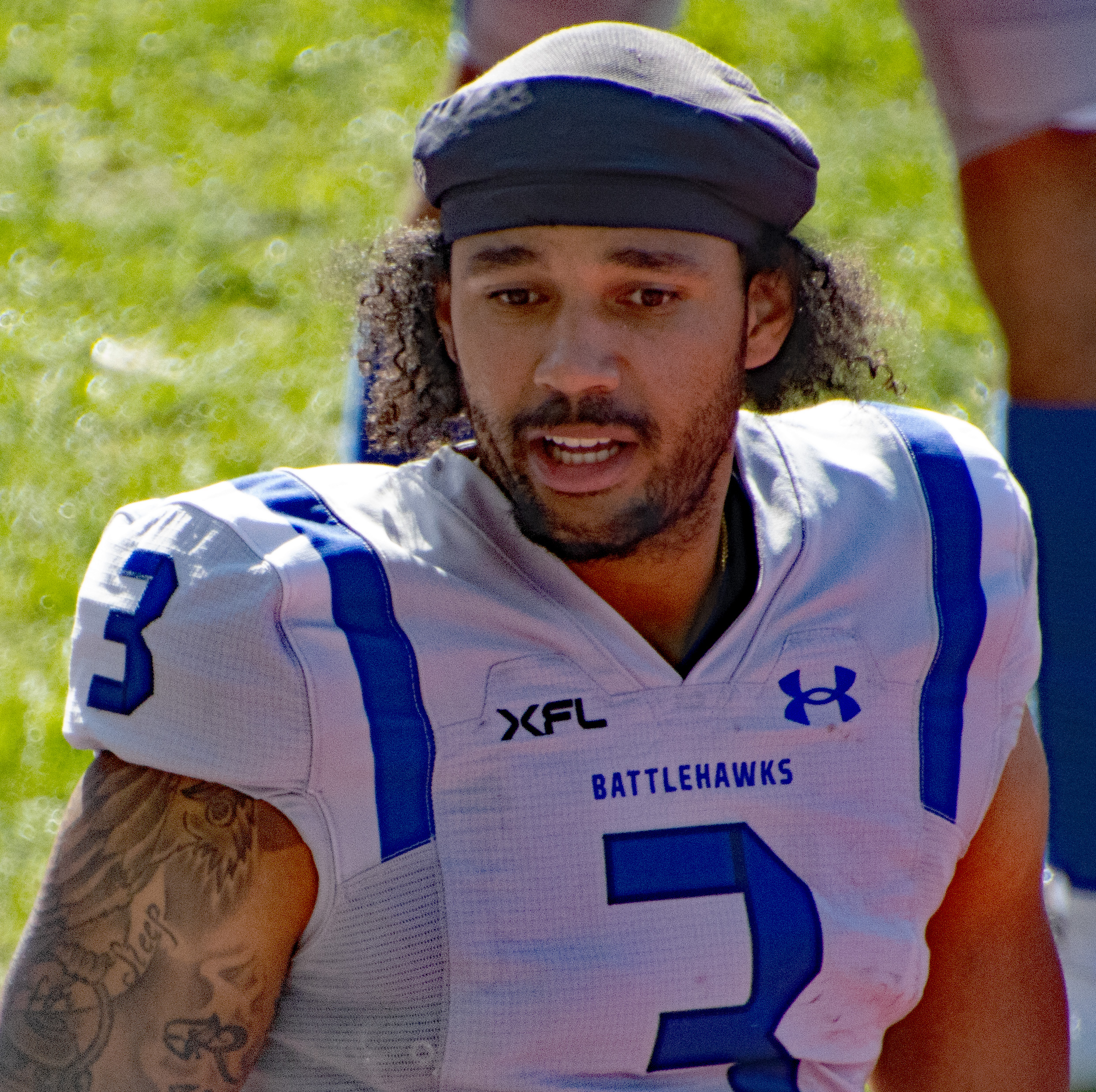
- Ateman with the St. Louis Battlehawks in 2023

No. 88, 3
- Position: Wide receiver

Personal information
- Born: September 16, 1994 (age 32); Dallas, Texas, U.S.
- Listed height: 6 ft 4 in (1.93 m)
- Listed weight: 216 lb (98 kg)

Career information
- High school: Wylie East (Wylie, Texas)
- College: Oklahoma State (2013–2017)
- NFL draft: 2018: 7th round, 228th overall pick

Career history
- Oakland / Las Vegas Raiders (2018–2021); Arizona Cardinals (2022)*; St. Louis BattleHawks (2023); Buffalo Bills (2023)*; St. Louis BattleHawks (2024)
- * Offseason or practice squad member only

Awards and highlights
- Second-team All-Big 12 (2017)

Career NFL statistics
- Receptions: 20
- Receiving yards: 270
- Receiving touchdowns: 1
- Stats at Pro Football Reference

Marcell Ligon Ateman (born September 16, 1994) is an American former professional football player who was a wide receiver in the National Football League (NFL). He played college football for the Oklahoma State Cowboys.

== Early life ==
Ateman attended Wylie East High School in Wylie, Texas. As a senior, he had 84 receptions for 1,584 yards and 27 touchdowns. He committed to Oklahoma State University to play college football.

== College career ==
Ateman played at Oklahoma State from 2013 to 2017. As a true freshman, he played in all 13 games, recording 22 receptions for 276 yards. As a sophomore, he had 20 receptions for 268 yards. As a junior, he had 45 receptions for 766 yards and five touchdowns. Ateman missed the 2016 season due to a foot injury and took a medical redshirt. He returned from the injury and played in all 13 games in 2017, recording 59 receptions for 1,156 yards and eight touchdowns.

== Professional career ==
Pre-draft measurables
Height	Weight	Arm length	Hand span	Wingspan	40-yard dash	10-yard split	20-yard split	20-yard shuttle	Three-cone drill	Vertical jump	Broad jump	Bench press
6 ft 4 1/2 in (1.94 m)	216 lb (98 kg)	32 7/8 in (0.84 m)	9 in (0.23 m)	6 ft 6 1/2 in (1.99 m)	4.62 s	1.55 s	2.73 s	4.25 s	7.07 s	34.0 in (0.86 m)	10 ft 1 in (3.07 m)	13 reps
All values from NFL Combine

=== Oakland / Las Vegas Raiders ===
Ateman was selected by the Oakland Raiders in the seventh round (228th overall) of the 2018 NFL draft. He was waived on September 1, 2018, and was signed to the practice squad the next day. He was promoted to the active roster on October 23, 2018. He made his NFL debut on November 18, 2018, in a Week 11 road game against the Arizona Cardinals, where he had 4 receptions for 50 yards and played a pivotal factor in the Raiders' game-winning drive, as they went on to win 23–21.

On August 31, 2019, Ateman was waived by the Raiders and re-signed to the practice squad. He was promoted to the active roster on October 5, 2019. He was waived on October 8, but re-signed two days later.

On September 5, 2020, Ateman was waived by the Raiders and signed to the practice squad the next day. He was placed on the practice squad/injured list on September 19, and activated back to the practice squad on October 21. He was released on December 10, 2020, and re-signed to the practice squad five days later. On February 3, 2021, Ateman signed a reserve/futures contract with the Raiders.

On August 24, 2021, Ateman was waived by the Raiders. He was re-signed to the practice squad on November 3. He was released on November 18.

=== Arizona Cardinals ===
On August 4, 2022, Ateman signed with the Cardinals. On August 22, 2022, he was released.

=== St. Louis Battlehawks (first stint) ===
Atemwan was selected by the St. Louis Battlehawks of the XFL with the second pick in the 2023 XFL Skill Players Draft. He was placed on the reserve list by the team on March 8, 2023, and activated on March 27. He was released from his contract on June 1, 2023.

=== Buffalo Bills ===
On June 1, 2023, Ateman signed with the Buffalo Bills. He was waived on August 29, 2023, and re-signed to the practice squad. He was released on October 3, 2023.

=== St. Louis Battlehawks (second stint) ===
On January 19, 2024, Ateman re-signed with the Battlehawks.
