= Wylie High School (Wylie, Texas) =

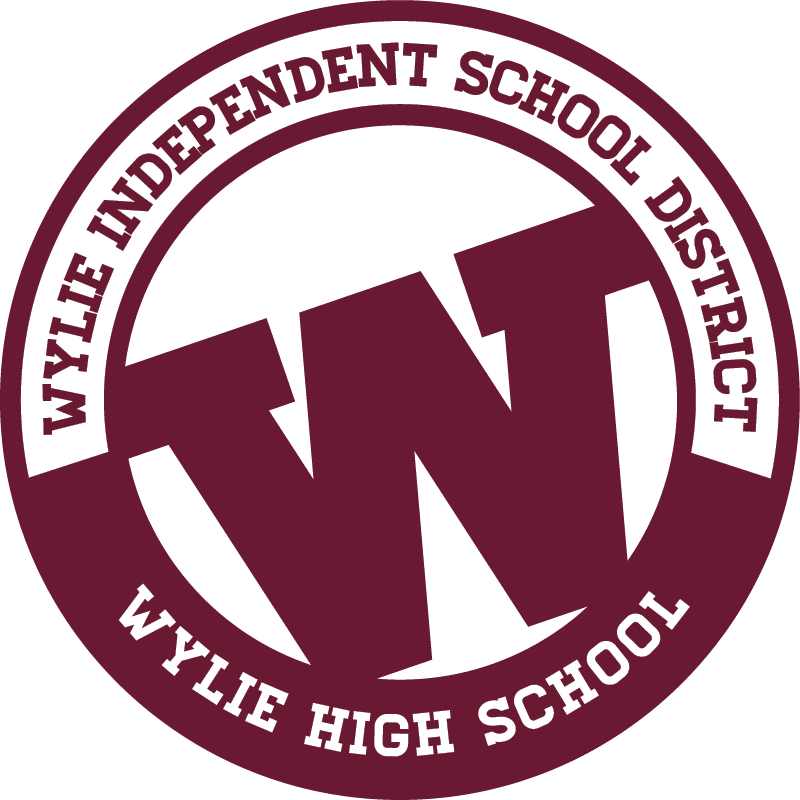

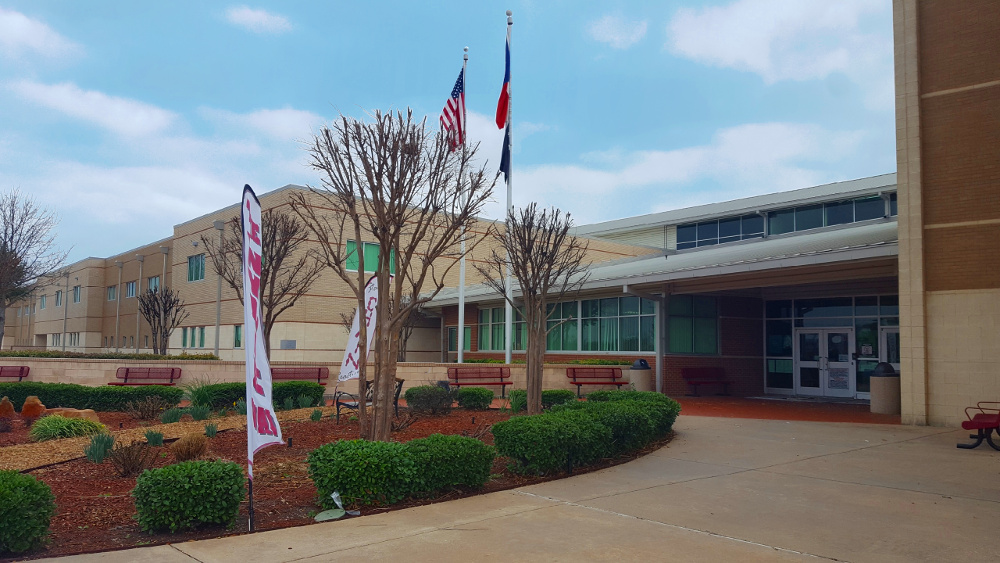

Location
- 2550 West FM 544; Wylie, Texas 75098-0490; United States; 33.008073°N 96.571449°W

Information
- School type: Public high school
- Established: 1905
- School district: Wylie Independent School District
- Principal: Brian Alexander
- Teaching staff: 174.06 (FTE)
- Grades: 9–12
- Enrollment: 3,095 (2023–2024)
- Student to teacher ratio: 17.78
- Campus: Suburban
- Colors: Maroon, White and Black
- Athletics conference: UIL Class 6A
- Nickname: Pirates/Lady Pirates
- Newspaper: The Peg Leg
- Yearbook: The Legend
- Feeder schools: Cooper Junior High; McMillan Junior High
- Website: whs.wylieisd.net

Wylie High School (commonly Wylie High School or WHS) is a public high school located in Wylie, Texas (United States) and classified as a 6A school by the UIL. It is part of the Wylie Independent School District which covers south central Collin County and includes portions of the communities of Sachse, St. Paul and Murphy along with Wylie. Until the 2007 opening of Wylie East High School, Wylie High School was the only high school in Wylie ISD.

In 2015, the school was rated "Met Standard" by the Texas Education Agency.

== History ==
In the 1890s, the town of Wylie had been served by a small school operating on a limited budget, primarily contributed by the parents of the students of the schools. Ovid Birmingham noticed this problem while traveling and established Wylie ISD in 1901–1902. He set limits of the district that all citizens in that area would pay taxes to support the district. The Birmingham family soon provided money to build the original Wylie High School. Wylie High has resided in several different buildings in its history.

Beginning in the 1976 school year, Wylie High School moved to a new building at 516 Hilltop Lane. This building could hold up to 600 students prior to the 1985 expansion of the school. Once the new Wylie High School was opened in 1996, this building was converted into Wylie Junior High School, later becoming Burnett Junior High School, named after the former principal of Wylie High School, Grady Burnett.

Wylie East High School was opened for the 2007–2008 school year. The school initially served solely ninth grade students. Wylie East became a 9-12 school, with the Class of 2012 being the first class to graduate after the district voted to have multiple 9-12 campuses in January 2008. Wylie East began the 2009–2010 school year with freshmen and sophomores. Wylie ISD serves most of the city of Wylie, including the city of St. Paul, a portion of the city of Murphy, and the Collin County portion of the city of Sachse. Enrollment has grown to just over 19,000 students with more than 2000 full-time employees.

In 2020, then current principal Virdie Montgomery drove 800 miles to personally congratulate all 612 graduating seniors after graduation ceremonies were canceled due to the COVID-19 pandemic. Wylie High School's current principal is Brian Alexander.

Starting in the 2026-2027 school year, McMillan Junior High School, which, since its opening, had to evenly split its 8th grade class between Wylie High and Wylie East High school, will now exclusively feed into Wylie High, following the addition of two new schools in the WEHS feeder pattern.

== Activities ==
The extracurricular activities offered at Wylie High School are many and varied due to the school's large size. There are chapters of national organizations such as the National Honor Society and the Air Force Junior ROTC, as well as service organizations such as SkillsUSA, Rachel's Challenge, Spanish Club, French Club, Debate, and FCCLA. The usual range of athletic and music organizations, Choir, Band, Orchestra and Theatre, are available for students to join also, including Drill Team and Cheer.

== Athletics ==
The Wylie Pirates compete in these sports:

- Baseball
- Basketball
- Cross Country
- Football (State Championship in 1978)
- Golf
- Lacrosse
- Powerlifting
- Soccer
- Softball
- Tennis
- Track and Field
- Volleyball
- Wrestling

== Notable alumni ==
- Kohl Drake, MLB player
- Kyle Fuller, NFL player
- Chris Givens, NFL and CFL player
- Kameron Kelly, NFL and CFL player
- Nikita Whitlock, NFL and CFL player
- Nathan Yocum, film producer and writer
