= Achieve Academy =

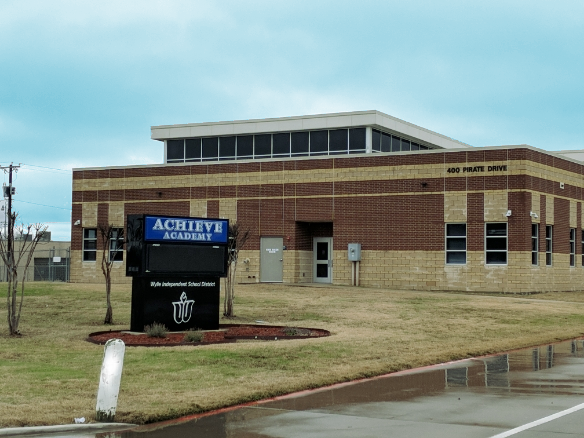

Location
- 400 Pirate Drive; Wylie, Texas 75098; United States; 33.003696°N 96.532894°W

Information
- School type: Public alternative school
- School district: Wylie Independent School District
- Principal: Janet Wyatt
- Grades: 6-12
- Enrollment: 140 (2022)
- Campus: Suburban
- Website: www.wylieisd.net/achieve

Achieve Academy (commonly Achieve or Choice) is a public alternative school located in Wylie, Texas, United States. It is part of the Wylie Independent School District. The school is designed for kids with multiple suspensions or who have been expelled from other schools.

== History ==
The DAEP and Choice programs were located at the Wylie Special Programs Center from early 2006, serving only 16 students. By mid-2009, the enrolled had increased to 26, and the Special Programs Center was renamed to Achieve Academy.

In October 2010, construction began on a new building for Achieve, where it has remained since completion.

== Programs ==
Achieve Academy offers two distinct programs for its students: The Discipline Alternative Education Program (DAEP) and Choice Academic High School. For both programs, the majority of courses are done through Edgenuity, an online school curriculum. Courses that require end-of-course assessments are done in traditional classroom settings.

=== Disciplinary Alternative Education Program ===
The DAEP is for students who have received disciplinary action or expulsion from their original campus. This program is open to students from the third grade onward.

=== Choice Academic High School ===
Choice is a high school program aimed toward students either unable to succeed in a traditional high school setting, require flexibility in school hours, or who wish to graduate early. Credit recovery and accelerated curriculum are also available through Choice. This program is completely voluntary, and requires an application to be filed by the student and their legal guardian.
