= Braden Shewmake =

American baseball player (born 1997)

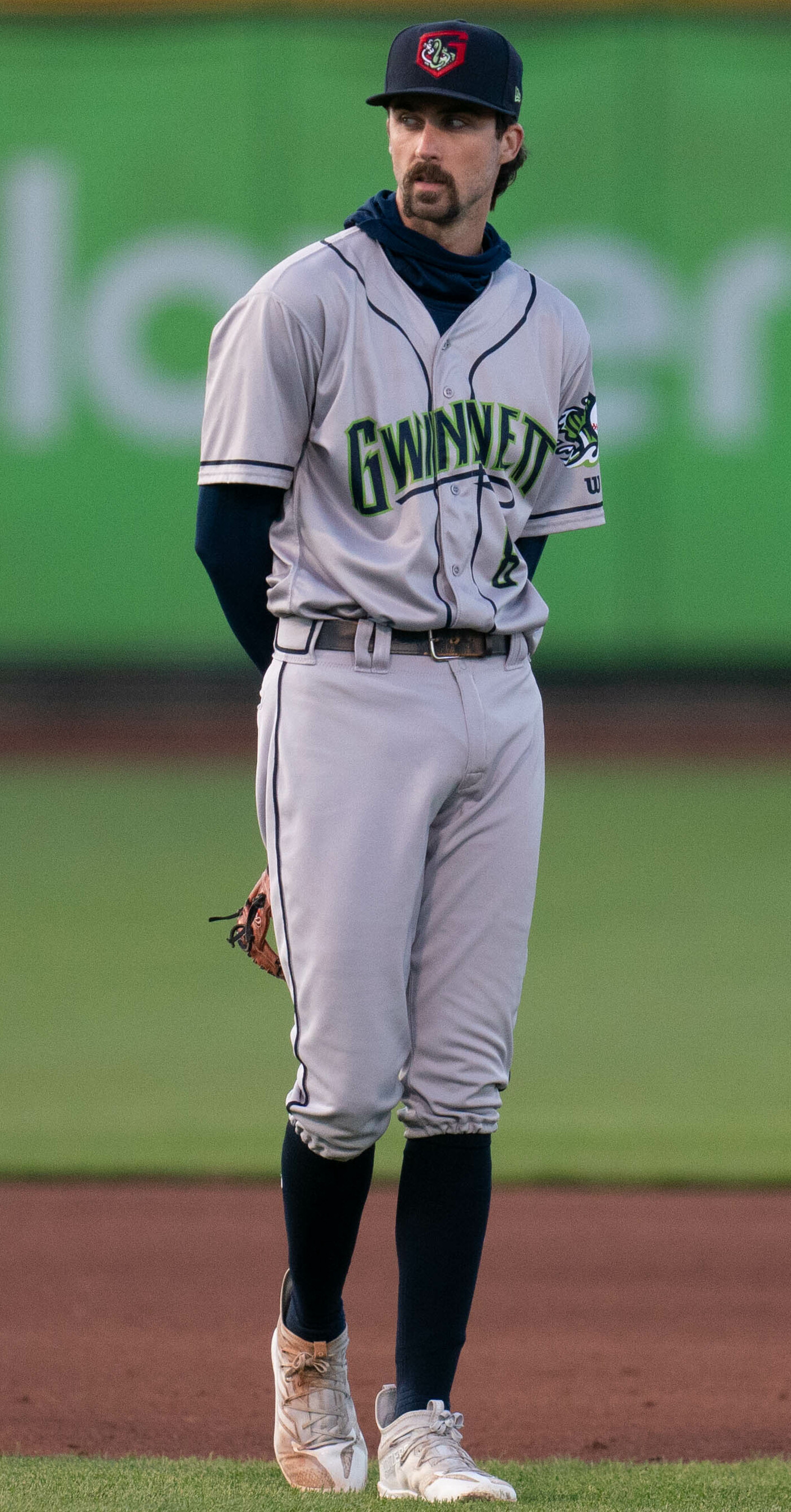
- Shewmake with the Gwinnett Stripers in 2023

Free agent
- Infielder
- Born: November 19, 1997 (age 28); Wylie, Texas, U.S.
- Bats: Left Throws: Right

MLB debut
- May 5, 2023, for the Atlanta Braves

MLB statistics (through 2026 season)
- Batting average: .196
- Home runs: 4
- Runs batted in: 14
- Stats at Baseball Reference

Teams
- Atlanta Braves (2023); Chicago White Sox (2024); Houston Astros (2026); Milwaukee Brewers (2026)

Braden Jack Shewmake (born November 19, 1997) is an American professional baseball infielder who is a free agent. He has previously played in MLB for the Atlanta Braves, Chicago White Sox, Houston Astros and Milwaukee Brewers. The Braves selected Shewmake with the 21st overall pick in the 2019 MLB draft, and he made his MLB debut with them in 2023.

== Amateur career ==
Shewmake attended and graduated from Wylie East High School in Wylie, Texas, where he played baseball, football, and basketball. As a senior, he hit .295 with 28 RBIs and was named to the Texas 5A All-State Baseball Team. Undrafted out of high school in the 2016 Major League Baseball draft, he enrolled at Texas A&M University to play college baseball for the Texas A&M Aggies.

In 2017, as a freshman, Shewmake batted .328 with 11 home runs and 69 RBIs in 64 starts. He was named the Southeastern Conference (SEC) Freshman of the Year along with being named Collegiate Baseball's Freshman of the Year. Furthermore, he was named an All-American by multiple media outlets including Collegiate Baseball and Baseball America. Shewmake spent that summer playing for the USA Baseball Collegiate National Team. As a sophomore in 2018, Shewmake started all 61 games in which he hit .327 with five home runs, 45 RBIs, and 12 stolen bases. He was named to the All-SEC First Team for the second straight year. That summer, he returned to play for the USA Baseball Collegiate National Team. In 2019, his junior season, he batted primarily in the leadoff spot. He played in 63 games and batted .313 with six home runs, 47 RBIs, and nine stolen bases.

== Professional career ==
=== Atlanta Braves ===
Shewmake was considered one of the top prospects for the 2019 Major League Baseball draft. He was selected by the Atlanta Braves with the 21st overall pick. He signed for $3.13 million, and was assigned to the Rome Braves of the Single-A South Atlantic League. After slashing .318/.389/.473 with three home runs, 39 RBIs, and 11 stolen bases over 51 games with Rome, he was promoted to the Mississippi Braves of the Double-A Southern League in August, and finished the season there. Over 14 games with Mississippi, Shewmake hit .217.

Shewmake did not play a minor league game in 2020 due to the cancellation of the minor league season caused by the COVID-19 pandemic. For the 2021 season, he returned to Mississippi (now members of the Double-A South), slashing .228/.271/.401 with 12 home runs and forty RBIs over 83 games. Shewmake was assigned to the Gwinnett Stripers of the Triple-A International League to begin the 2022 season. In early August, he was placed on the injured list with a left leg injury after being carted off of the field following a collision with left fielder Travis Demeritte, and he missed the remainder of the season. Over 76 games prior to the injury, he slashed .259/.316/.399 with seven home runs and 25 RBIs.

On November 15, 2022, the Braves selected Shewmake's contract and added him to the 40-man roster to protect him from the Rule 5 draft. Shewmake battled with Orlando Arcia and Vaughn Grissom for the starting shortstop job during spring training in 2023. On March 20, Shewmake and Grissom were optioned to Triple-A Gwinnett in favor of Arcia.

On May 5, 2023, Shewmake was promoted to the major leagues for the first time, and made his debut later that day against the Baltimore Orioles.

In a game against the St. Paul Saints on June 28, 2023, Shewmake hit for the cycle, the first in Gwinnett history.

=== Chicago White Sox ===
On November 16, 2023, the Braves traded Shewmake to the Chicago White Sox, along with Michael Soroka, Nicky Lopez, Jared Shuster and Riley Gowens for Aaron Bummer. He played in 29 games for the White Sox in 2024, batting .125/.134/.203 with one home run, four RBI, and five stolen bases. On January 1, 2025, Shewmake was designated for assignment by Chicago following the acquisition of Tyler Gilbert.

=== New York Yankees ===
On January 8, 2025, Shewmake was claimed off waivers by the Kansas City Royals. He was designated for assignment by the Royals on January 31. On February 5, Shewmake was claimed off waivers by the New York Yankees. He was optioned to the Triple-A Scranton/Wilkes-Barre RailRiders to begin the season. In 85 games for Scranton, Shewmake batted .244/.318/.362 with four home runs, 29 RBI, and 15 stolen bases.

On February 5, 2026, Shewmake was designated for assignment by the Yankees. He cleared waivers and was sent outright to Triple-A Scranton/Wilkes-Barre on February 9. In 10 appearances for Scranton, Shewmake batted .250/.314/.313 with one RBI and one stolen base.

=== Houston Astros ===
On April 19, 2026, Shewmake was traded to the Houston Astros in exchange for minor league pitcher Wilmy Sanchez. The following day, the Astros selected Shewmake's contract, adding him to their active roster. From April 30 to May 15, Shewmake logged a 10-game hitting streak during which he hit. 389 with two home runs and six RBI. He made 30 appearances for the Astros, batting .256/.272/.423 with three home runs and nine RBI. Shewmake was designated for assignment by Houston on July 10.

=== Milwaukee Brewers ===
On July 12, 2026, Shewmake was traded to the Milwaukee Brewers in exchange for cash considerations. He made four appearances for Milwaukee, going 2-for-7 (.286) with one RBI and one stolen base. On July 24, Shewmake was designated for assignment by the Brewers. He cleared waivers and elected free agency on July 28.

=== Houston Astros (second stint) ===
On July 31, 2026, Shewmake signed a minor league contract with the Houston Astros. He elected free agency on November 2.

== Scouting report ==
In college, Shewmake was known for his ability to hit to all fields. Sometime after starting his professional career, he focused on pulling the baseball, returning to his collegiate hitting philosophy before the 2023 regular season began. His speed and defensive abilities have also drawn attention.

== Personal life ==
Shewmake's father Shane coaches baseball at the University of Texas at Dallas. Shewmake is married to Emily, and their son was born in June 2022.
