= Wylie Independent School District (Collin County, Texas) =

School district in Texas

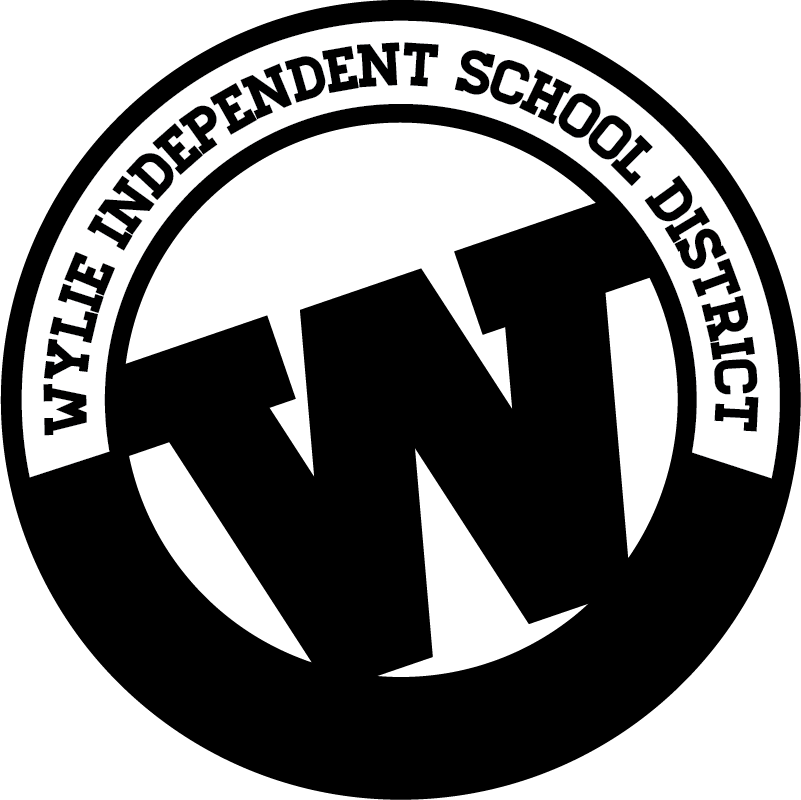

Address
- 951 South Ballard Avenue Wylie, TX, USA ESC Region 10
- Coordinates: 33.0047803026808°N 96.5402529878241°W

District information
- Type: Independent School District
- Grades: PK-12
- Established: 1901; 125 years ago
- Superintendent: Dr. Kim Spicer
- Governing agency: Texas Education Agency
- Schools: 22
- NCES District ID: 4846530
- Enrollment: 19,469 (2025-26)

Other information
- Website: www.wylieisd.net

Wylie Independent School District (Wylie ISD or WISD) is a school district based in Wylie, Texas, United States. Covering approximately 41 square miles in south central Collin County, the district serves most of the city of Wylie, the city of St. Paul, portions of the cities of Lucas and Murphy, the Collin County portion of the city of Sachse, and much of Seis Lagos. Some areas in the Dallas city limits lie in the Wylie ISD limits.

As of 2026, Wylie ISD operates 23 campuses, including 2 high schools, 8 middle schools, 12 primary schools, and 1 alternative school. The district most recently received an "A" rating from the Texas Education Agency.

== History ==
In the 1890s, the town of Wylie had been served by a small school with small funding primarily by the parents of the students of the schools. Thomas Franklin Birmingham noticed this problem traveling and established Wylie ISD in 1901-1902. He set limits of the district that all citizens in that area would pay taxes to uphold the district. The Birmingham family had provided money to build a proper high school. Since then the Birmingham family has established various Land Trusts to fund areas of curriculum for the district as well as scholarships for 20 Wylie ISD seniors in the graduating class. The city and district has honored him and his family with the Birmingham Elementary School and streets among other things.

In 1905, Wylie High School was established.

In 1967, a new WHS campus was built.

In 1969, WHS received an expansion and became known as Wylie Jr./Sr. High School.

In 1976, a new WHS campus was opened. The 1967 campus became Wylie Middle School with grades 6-8.

In 1977, Coach Jerry Shaffer creates the Wylie High School "AHMO" pirate tradition.

In 1996, a new WHS campus was opened. The 1976 campus became Wylie Junior High with grades 7-8, and the 1967 campus transitioned to Wylie Intermediate School with grades 5-6.

In 2003, McMillan Junior High (Marauders) opened. Wylie Junior High and Intermediate schools were respectively renamed Burnett Junior High and Harrison Intermediate (both mascots Buccaneers).

In 2004, Davis Intermediate (Marauders) opened, becoming a feeder for McMillan JH.

In 2006, Cooper Junior High (Patriots) opened.

In 2007, Draper Intermediate (Patriots) opened, becoming a feeder for Cooper JH. Wylie East High School opened as the district's freshman campus, serving as a direct feeder to Wylie High School.

In 2015 all Wylie ISD campuses underwent renovations to bring them well in the 21st century.

In 2019, voters approved a new $193.7 million dollar bond issue for improvements and expansion of schools throughout the district.

On September 23, 2025, the school board unanimously voted to name Dr. Kim Spicer, who previously served as Deputy Superintendent under Dr. David Vinson (2011-2025), as Wylie ISD’s next superintendent. Effective October 21, Spicer became the district’s first female superintendent in its entire history.

In 2026, Parker Junior High and Hampton Intermediate opened, creating a 4th middle grades feeder pattern. With these additions, the middle grades campuses aligned their mascots with their feeder high schools. Burnett, Hampton, Harrison, and Parker became Raiders, while Cooper, Draper, Davis, and McMillan became Pirates.

== Standardized dress ==
Since the 2006-2007 school year, all Wylie ISD students in grades 5 through 12 have had to comply with a standardized dress code, which is similar to a school uniform. In the 2007-2008 school year, the dress code went largely unchanged, except that hooded sweatshirts were not accepted. The dress code included wearing a tucked in solid polo shirt, turtle neck, or button up shirts. Bottoms were specified to be pants, shorts, or skirt, paired with a belt, in khaki, black, or navy blue.

In 2011, the Wylie ISD school board officially changed its policy to allow hooded sweatshirts, pants with rivets, cargo pants, colored belts, and shoelaces. The dress code was changed again in 2017 to allow all hoodies, untucked shirts, and mock turtle necks.

In May 2021, dress code was changed by the Wylie ISD school board once again to allow a more relaxed dress code for the 2021-22 school year. The dress code allows for solid colored pants, but still prohibits: holes, rips, and or tears.

As of the 2025-2026 school year, Wylie ISD has updated the dress code to allow non-collared shirts that have sleeves and fully cover the chest, back, stomach, and shoulders, one small nose stud, and all bottoms with no rips above the knee that reach the mid-thigh, excluding leggings.

== Demographics ==
Ethnicity	Percent
White	44.5%
Hispanic	22.6%
African American	15.4%
Asian	12.4%
Two or more races	4.6%

== Schools ==
=== High schools ===
Name	Grades	Established	Mascot	Loction	Additional information
Wylie High	9-12	1905	Pirates	Wylie	Current campus opened in 2003; formerly located at Burnett Junior High and Harrison Intermediate campuses
Wylie East High	9-12	2007	Raiders	Wylie	9th-only from 2007-2009, then added one grade per year

=== Middle schools ===
Name	Grades	Established	Mascot	Location	Additional information
Burnett Junior High	7-8	1996	Raiders	Wylie	Campus opened as Wylie High in 1976; formerly Wylie Junior High from 1996-2003; previous mascot was the Buccaneer until 2026
Cooper Junior High	7-8	2006	Pirates	Wylie	Previous mascot was the Patriot until 2026
Davis Intermediate	5-6	2004	Pirates	Wylie	Previous mascot was the Marauder until 2026
Draper Intermediate	5-6	2007	Pirates	Wylie	Previous mascot was the Patriot until 2026
Hampton Intermediate	5-6	2026	Raiders	Wylie	
Harrison Intermediate	5-6	1976	Raiders	Wylie	Campus opened as Wylie High in 1967; was expanded and renamed Wylie Jr./Sr. High from 1969-1976; was known as Wylie Middle (grades 6-8) from 1976-1996; was known as Wylie Intermediate (grades 5-6) until 2002; previous mascot was the Buccaneer until 2026
McMillan Junior High	7-8	2003	Pirates	Wylie	Previous mascot was the Marauder until 2026
Parker Junior High	7-8	2026	Raiders	Wylie	

=== Primary schools ===
Name	Grades	Established	Mascot	Location	Additional information
Akin Elementary	K-4	1988	Frogs	Wylie	
Birmingham Elementary	K-4	1985	Bears	Wylie	
Bush Elementary	K-4	2016	Bald Eagles	St. Paul	
Cox Elementary	K-4	2004	Coyotes	Sachse	
Dodd Elementary	K-4	1999	Dinosaurs	Wylie	
Groves Elementary	K-4	2002	Gators	Wylie	
Hartman Early Childhood Learning Center	Pre-K	1963	Cool Cats	Wylie	Formerly Hartman Elementary from 1963-2025
Kreymer Elementary	K-4	2025	Kangaroos	Wylie	
Smith Elementary	K-4	2007	Bulldogs	Wylie	
Tibbals Elementary	K-4	2005	Tigers	Murphy	
Watkins Elementary	K-4	2010	Wranglers	Wylie	
Whitt Elementary	K-4	2008	Wolves	Sachse	

=== Alternative schools ===
Name	Grades	Additional information
Achieve Academy	6-12	Hosts DAEP and academic choice programs
