= Wylie East High School =

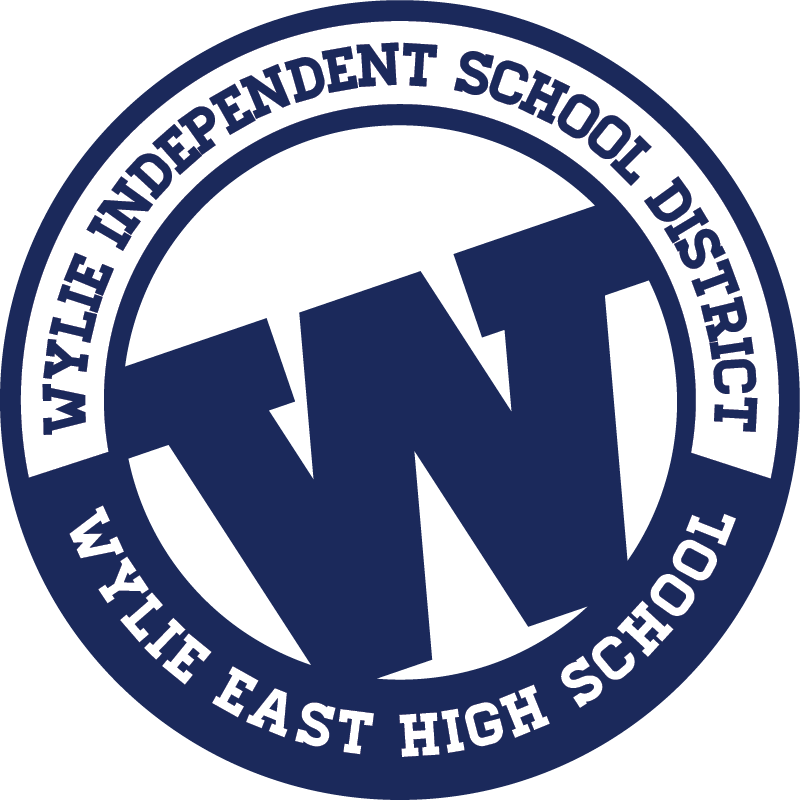

Location
- 3000 Wylie East Drive; Wylie, Collin, Texas 75098; United States; 33.01677°N 96.49414°W

Information
- School type: Public high school
- Motto: It's a great day to be alive, and a great day to be a Raider
- Established: 2007
- School board: Wylie ISD Board of Trustees
- School district: Wylie Independent School District
- Principal: Dr. Timothy Benson
- Teaching staff: 151.89 (FTE)
- Grades: 9-12
- Enrollment: 2,640 (2023-2024)
- Student to teacher ratio: 17.38
- Hours in school day: 9:00 AM - 4:20 PM
- Campus type: Suburban
- Colors: Navy Blue, Jay Blue & Silver
- Athletics conference: UIL Class 6A
- Mascot: Raider/Lady Raider
- Rival: Wylie High School
- Newspaper: Wylie East Blueprint
- Yearbook: The Dynasty
- Feeder schools: Burnett Junior High; Parker Junior High
- Alumni: Addie McCain; Eno Benjamin
- Website: wehs.wylieisd.net

Wylie East High School (commonly Wylie East or WEHS) is a public high school located in Wylie, Texas (USA). It is classified as a 6A school by the UIL and is one of the two high schools in the Wylie Independent School District located in south central Collin County, serving mostly residents of Wylie as well as some residents of St Paul and Sachse.

In 2019, the school was rated an average of a 91.3 by the Texas Education Agency.

== History ==
Wylie East High School opened for the 2007–2008 school year, serving only ninth grade students. District residents were asked to present suggestions at board meetings in late 2007 on whether to pursue multiple high schools, which the district voted in favor of in January 2008. Wylie East then began the 2009–2010 school year serving ninth and tenth grade students, and the Class of 2012 became the first class to graduate. The Class of 2011 (the school's first class) went on to graduate at Wylie High School.

Due to a $21 million bond passed in May 2012, the school underwent renovations and additions worth $18 million, making Wylie East the largest campus in Wylie ISD. These renovations added career and technology classrooms, science classrooms, 500 parking spaces, a field house, a band hall, and two gymnasiums.

Later, in May 2019, Wylie East received a bond of $87 million, in order to make several more renovations to the school. These changes are adding new classrooms, CTE Building, hallways, and a new gymnasium (named the Mike Williams Event Center, after the founding principal of the school). The renovations were completed in 2022.

Starting in the 2026-2027 school year, Wylie East will have two new schools (one intermediate, one junior high) in its feeder pattern. Together with Harrison Intermediate and Burnett Junior High, the new Hampton Intermediate and Parker Junior High Schools will cleanly feed into Wylie East. McMillan Junior High, which, since its opening, had to evenly divide its 8th grade class between Wylie High and Wylie East, will now exclusively feed into Wylie High School following this new pattern.

Each year the graduating class donates something significant to the school, from park benches, to a decorative rock logo, to a steel raider statue. These items are proudly displayed in front of the school to remember each graduating class.

In 2026, Wylie East received national media attention due to a scandal involving an Islamic advocacy group, “Why Islam?”, that was invited by the school’s Muslim Student Association to table during lunch. Representatives from the group reportedly handed out hijabs and books about Sharia law, according to some eyewitnesses. On May 27, 2026, Tiffany Doolan, who served as the school’s Principal since 2020, announced her resignation at the end of her contract on June 30. Dr. Timothy Benson, an educator from Royse City, Texas, succeeded her as Principal effective July 1.

== Athletics ==
The Wylie East Raiders compete in the following sports:

- Baseball
- Basketball
- Cheerleading
- Cross Country
- Football
- Golf
- Powerlifting
- Soccer
- Softball
- Tennis
- Track and Field
- Volleyball
- Wrestling

=== State titles ===
- Girls Soccer -
  - 2014(5A)
