= Sachse, Texas =

- City
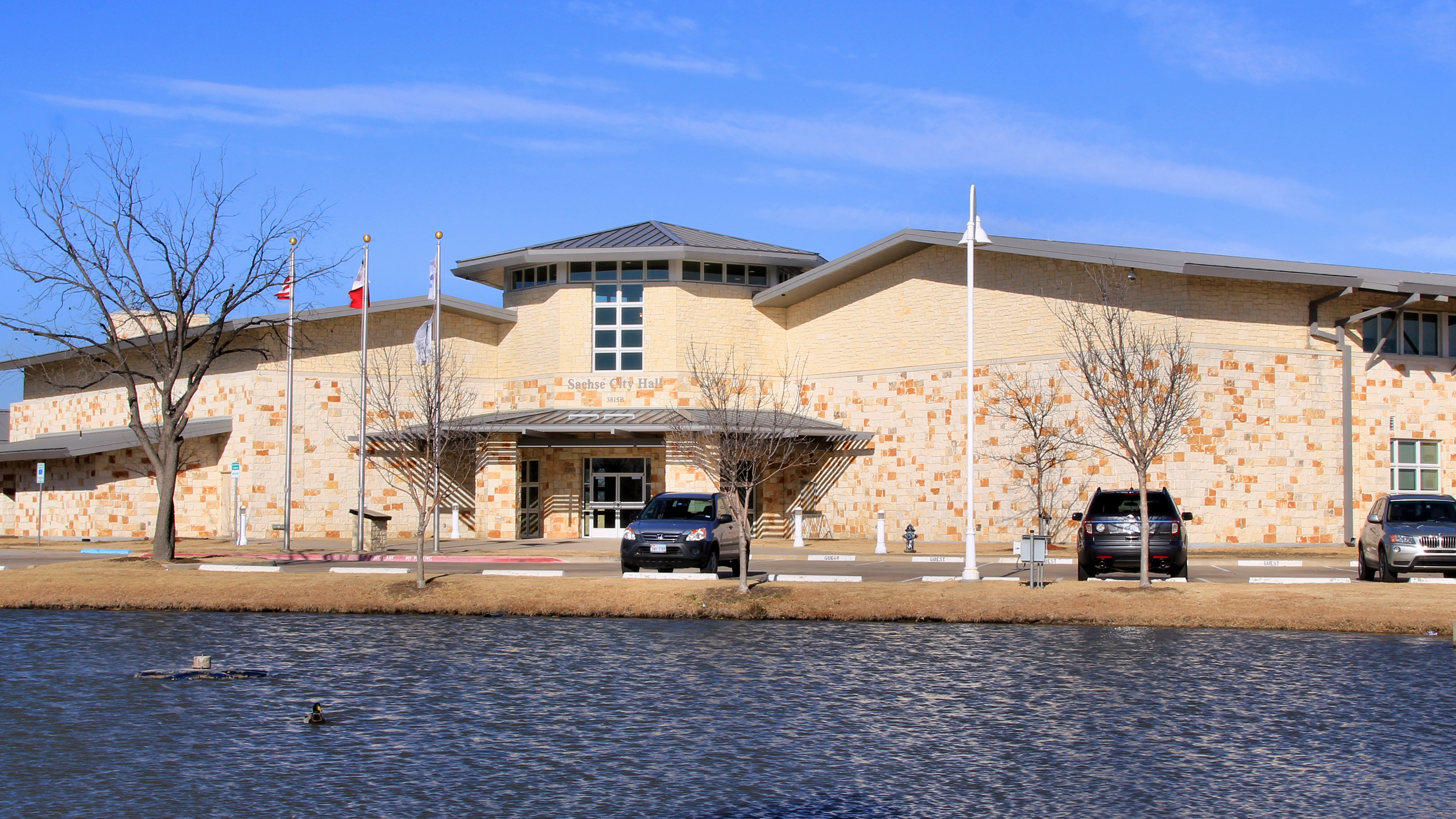
- Sachse City Hall

- Location in Dallas County and the state of Texas
- Coordinates: 32°58′35″N 96°35′10″W
- Country: United States
- State: Texas
- Counties: Collin, Dallas

Government
  - Type: Council-Manager
  - City Council: Mayor Jeff Bickerstaff; Mayor Pro-Tem Brett Franks; Michelle Howarth; Frank Millsap; Tim Leigh-Page; Lindsay Buhler; Matt Prestenberg
  - City Manager: Gina Nash

Area
  - Total: 9.88 sq mi (25.60 km^{2})
  - Land: 9.77 sq mi (25.30 km^{2})
  - Water: 0.12 sq mi (0.30 km^{2}) 1.62%
- Elevation: 548 ft (167 m)

Population (2020)
  - Total: 27,103
  - Estimate (2021): 29,042
  - Density: 2,775/sq mi (1,071/km^{2})
- Time zone: UTC-6 (Central)
  - Summer (DST): UTC-5 (Central)
- ZIP code: 75048
- Area codes: 214, 469, 945, 972
- FIPS code: 48-64064
- GNIS feature ID: 2411019
- Website: http://www.cityofsachse.com

Sachse (/ˈsæksi/ SAK-see) is a city in Collin and Dallas counties in the U.S. state of Texas and is part of the DFW metroplex. A northeastern suburb of Dallas, the city population was 27,103, as of the 2020 census with an estimated population of 33,768 people today. Sachse is located off SH 78 and the President George Bush Turnpike and is approximately 1 mile (1.6 km) north of the Firewheel Town Center.

== History ==
Sachse was founded by William Sachse, a European immigrant from Herford, Prussia (modern-day North Rhine-Westphalia), in 1845. Purchasing 640 acres (2.6 km^{2}) from Collin County, Sachse erected the first cotton mills and gins in the county. After Sachse gave 100 feet of frontage through all of his holdings to the railroad in 1886, the railroad built a depot on the frontage and named the town Sachse. Since the depot was labeled 'Saxie', many old legal documents referred to the city as 'Saxie'. The flaw was corrected in 1892. The word Sachse comes from the German word for Saxon.

== Geography ==
According to the United States Census Bureau, the city has a total area of 25.6 square kilometers (9.9 sq mi), of which 25.2 km^{2} (9.7 sq mi) is land and 0.4 km^{2} (0.2 sq mi) (1.62%) is water.

== Education ==
Sachse residents living in Dallas County attend schools in Garland Independent School District. Sachse residents living in Collin County attend schools in Wylie Independent School District.

Armstrong Elementary School, Sewell Elementary, Hudson Middle School, and Sachse High School serve Garland ISD within Sachse city limits. Garland ISD has a "choice-of-school" system that allows any student in the district to attend any school.

Cox Elementary School and Whitt Elementary School serve Wylie ISD within Sachse city limits. Wylie ISD has feeder school system in which each school feeds into the next school. Cox Elementary feeds into Harrison Intermediate School, Burnett Junior High School, and Wylie East High School and Whitt Elementary School feeds into Draper Intermediate School, Cooper Junior High School, and Wylie High School. All the secondary schools are located within the city of Wylie.

Residents in Dallas County are zoned to Dallas College (formerly the Dallas County Community College District or DCCCD). Residents in Collin County are zoned to Collin College.

== Demographics ==
Historical population
Census	Pop.	Note	%±
1960	359		—
1970	777		116.4%
1980	1,640		111.1%
1990	5,346		226.0%
2000	9,751		82.4%
2010	20,329		108.5%
2020	27,103		33.3%
2023 (est.)	32,294		19.2%
U.S. Decennial Census

=== 2020 census ===
As of the 2020 census, Sachse had a population of 27,103. The median age was 38.1 years. 27.3% of residents were under the age of 18 and 10.8% of residents were 65 years of age or older. For every 100 females there were 95.6 males, and for every 100 females age 18 and over there were 92.7 males age 18 and over.

98.0% of residents lived in urban areas, while 2.0% lived in rural areas.

There were 8,692 households in Sachse, of which 46.7% had children under the age of 18 living in them. Of all households, 68.4% were married-couple households, 10.0% were households with a male householder and no spouse or partner present, and 17.5% were households with a female householder and no spouse or partner present. About 12.8% of all households were made up of individuals and 4.4% had someone living alone who was 65 years of age or older.

There were 8,978 housing units, of which 3.2% were vacant. The homeowner vacancy rate was 0.6% and the rental vacancy rate was 7.0%.

Racial composition as of the 2020 census
Race	Number	Percent
White	14,593	53.8%
Black or African American	3,072	11.3%
American Indian and Alaska Native	193	0.7%
Asian	4,791	17.7%
Native Hawaiian and Other Pacific Islander	40	0.1%
Some other race	1,365	5.0%
Two or more races	3,049	11.2%
Hispanic or Latino (of any race)	4,245	15.7%

=== 2022 American Community Survey estimates ===
As of the 2022 American Community Survey estimates, there were 27,829 people and 9,565 households. The population density was 2,859.2 inhabitants per square mile (1,103.9/km^{2}). There were 9,758 housing units at an average density of 1,002.6 per square mile (387.1/km^{2}).

The racial makeup of the city was 57.2% White, 19.1% Asian, 11.5% Black or African American, 2.8% some other race, 1.2% Native American or Alaskan Native, and 0.2% Native Hawaiian or Other Pacific Islander, with 7.9% from two or more races. Hispanics or Latinos of any race were 9.8% of the population.

Of the 9,565 households, 38.7% had children under the age of 18 living with them, 23.7% had seniors 65 years or older living with them, 64.6% were married couples living together, 3.5% were couples cohabitating, 12.8% had a male householder with no partner present, and 19.1% had a female householder with no partner present. The median household size was 2.91 and the median family size was 3.40.

The age distribution was 22.8% under 18, 8.9% from 18 to 24, 25.1% from 25 to 44, 30.6% from 45 to 64, and 12.6% who were 65 or older. The median age was 40.6 years. For every 100 females, there were 88.9 males.

The median income for a household was $127,888, with family households having a median income of $135,080 and non-family households $95,224. The per capita income was $56,486. Males working full-time jobs had median earnings of $95,746 compared to $65,408 for females. Out of the 27,815 people with a determined poverty status, 2.0% were below the poverty line. Further, 1.6% of minors and 4.5% of seniors were below the poverty line.

In the survey, residents self-identified with various ethnic ancestries. People of German descent made up 10.0% of the population of the town, followed by English at 9.8%, Irish at 9.3%, American at 5.8%, Sub-Saharan African at 2.9%, Arab at 1.9%, Italian at 1.8%, Czech at 1.5%, Polish at 1.4%, French at 1.4%, Swedish at 1.0%, Scottish at 0.9%, Danish at 0.6%, and Welsh at 0.6%.

== Government ==
Incorporated in 1956, the City of Sachse adopted its Home Rule Charter in 1986 and is served by the North Central Texas Council of Governments. The city council is composed of a mayor and six council members. Each is elected at-large, serving three-year staggered terms with no term limits (Term limits were added in May 2023). Operating under a Council-Manager form of government, Sachse is a full-service city.
