= Ladd McConkey =

American football player (born 2001)

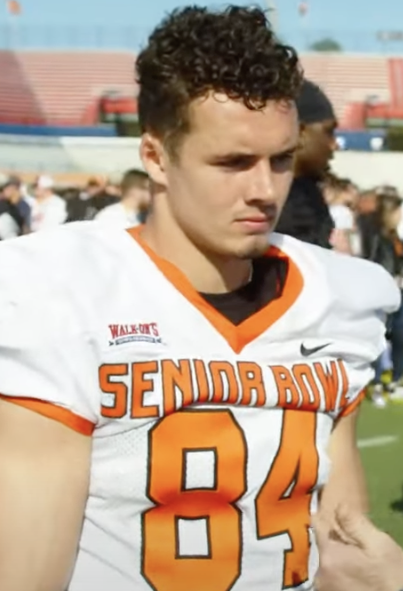
- McConkey at the 2024 Senior Bowl

No. 15 – Los Angeles Chargers
- Position: Wide receiver
- Roster status: Active

Personal information
- Born: November 11, 2001 (age 25); Chatsworth, Georgia, U.S.
- Listed height: 6 ft 0 in (1.83 m)
- Listed weight: 185 lb (84 kg)

Career information
- High school: North Murray (Chatsworth)
- College: Georgia (2020–2023)
- NFL draft: 2024: 2nd round, 34th overall pick

Career history
- Los Angeles Chargers (2024–present)

Awards and highlights
- 2× CFP national champion (2021, 2022); Wuerffel Trophy (2023); Second-team All-SEC (2022); NFL record: Receiving yards by a rookie in a playoff game: 197

Career NFL statistics as of Week 3, 2026
- Receptions: 160
- Receiving yards: 2,121
- Receiving touchdowns: 14
- Stats at Pro Football Reference

Andrew Ladd McConkey (born November 11, 2001) is an American professional football wide receiver for the Los Angeles Chargers of the National Football League (NFL). He played college football for the Georgia Bulldogs, winning two national championships and the 2023 Wuerffel Trophy. He was selected by the Chargers in the second round of the 2024 NFL draft.

== Early life ==
McConkey attended North Murray High School in Chatsworth, Georgia. He made the varsity team as a freshman. McConkey played quarterback, running back, defensive back, and punter and was also a return specialist. In his senior year, he led North Murray to a 9–1 record and the school's first ever region championship. McConkey finished the year with 36 total touchdowns and 3,051 total yards, being named the offensive player of the year for the region. McConkey was a three-star recruit and committed to the University of Georgia, his only Power Five offer, on February 2, 2020. His jersey number, 15, was retired by North Murray in 2023.

== College career ==
McConkey redshirted and was initially a member of Georgia's scout team. In McConkey's redshirt freshman year, he caught five touchdowns with 28 receptions for 430 yards. His first career touchdown came against Vanderbilt. McConkey also rushed for one touchdown. He was named the SEC Freshman of the Week after the 34–10 win over Auburn, where he had 135 yards receiving and one touchdown. McConkey played in all of Georgia's games making seven starts.

McConkey scored two touchdowns, one receiving, and one rushing, against Oregon in the 2022 season opener. Against Kent State, McConkey recorded a career high six receptions. He scored a touchdown against Florida before tallying a season-high 94 yards against #1 Tennessee. The following week against Mississippi State, McConkey would rush for a 70-yard touchdown while also adding a 17-yard receiving touchdown. He left the SEC Championship Game against LSU on December 3, 2022, due to knee tendinitis.

In the 2023 College Football Playoff National Championship Game, McConkey recorded five receptions for 88 yards and two touchdowns in a 65–7 victory. Following the game, he announced that he would return to Georgia for the 2023 season.

The following season, McConkey missed significant time due to injuries. He finished the regular season with 29 receptions for 456 yards and two touchdowns, and he was named the recipient of the Wuerffel Trophy. On January 1, 2024, McConkey declared for the 2024 NFL draft. McConkey graduated from Georgia in 2023 with a degree in finance.

== Professional career ==
Pre-draft measurables
Height	Weight	Arm length	Hand span	Wingspan	40-yard dash	10-yard split	20-yard split	20-yard shuttle	Three-cone drill	Vertical jump	Broad jump	Bench press
5 ft 11 5/8 in (1.82 m)	186 lb (84 kg)	30 1/4 in (0.77 m)	8 5/8 in (0.22 m)	6 ft 0 in (1.83 m)	4.39 s	1.52 s	2.54 s	4.04 s	6.72 s	36.0 in (0.91 m)	10 ft 4 in (3.15 m)	13 reps
All values from NFL Combine/Pro Day

McConkey was selected by the Los Angeles Chargers 34th overall with the pick acquired from a trade with New England Patriots. On June 19, 2024, McConkey signed his four-year rookie contract with the Chargers worth $9.9 million guaranteed, with a $4 million signing bonus. In his NFL debut, he scored a receiving touchdown in a 22–10 victory over the Las Vegas Raiders in Week 1. In a Week 8 victory over the New Orleans Saints, McConkey had six receptions for 111 yards and two touchdowns. In Week 11 against the Cincinnati Bengals, he had six receptions for 123 yards in the 34–27 win. In Week 17, McConkey broke the Chargers rookie franchise record for the most receptions and yards by a Charger rookie in a single season, a record formerly held by Keenan Allen. He had two receiving touchdowns in the game, a 40–7 victory over the New England Patriots. In the 2024 season, McConkey finished with 82 receptions for 1,149 yards and seven touchdowns. In the Wild Card Round of the playoffs, McConkey had nine receptions for 197 yards and a touchdown in the 32–12 loss. He set an NFL record for most receiving yards by a rookie in a single postseason game.

McConkey was voted by his fellow NFL players as the 100th best player in the league on the NFL Top 100 Players of 2025 list.

McConkey finished the 2025 season with 66 receptions for 789 yards and six touchdowns.

== Career statistics ==
Legend
	Led the League
**Bold**	Career high

=== NFL ===
==== Regular season ====
Year	Team	Games		Receiving							Fumbles	
Year	Team	GP	GS	Tgt	Rec	Yds	Avg	Y/G	Lng	TD	Fum	Lost
2024	LAC	16	14	**112**	**82**	**1,149**	**14.0**	**71.8**	**60**	**7**	2	0
2025	LAC	16	12	106	66	789	12.0	49.3	58	6	0	0
2026	LAC	4	2	17	12	183	15.3	45.8	29	1	0	0
Career		36	28	235	160	2,121	13.3	58.9	60	14	2	0

==== Postseason ====
Year	Team	Games		Receiving						Fumbles	
Year	Team	GP	GS	Tgt	Rec	Yds	Avg	Lng	TD	Fum	Lost
2024	LAC	1	1	**14**	**9**	**197**	**21.9**	**86**	**1**	0	0
2025	LAC	1	1	4	3	32	10.7	20	0	0	0
Career		2	2	18	12	229	19.1	86	1	0	0

=== College ===
College statistics
Season	Team	GP	Receiving				Rushing			
Season	Team	GP	Rec	Yds	Avg	TD	Att	Yds	Avg	TD
2020	Georgia	Redshirt (redshirt)								
2021	Georgia	15	31	447	14.4	5	4	44	11.0	1
2022	Georgia	15	**58**	**762**	13.1	**7**	**7**	**134**	**19.1**	**2**
2023	Georgia	9	30	478	**15.7**	2	2	38	19.0	1
Career		39	119	1,687	14.1	14	13	216	16.2	4

== Personal life ==
A middle child, McConkey grew up a fan of the Tennessee Volunteers. His father, Benji McConkey, was a star quarterback in high school at Dalton High, while his brother, Hinton McConkey, played quarterback for the University of West Georgia in Division II in 2018, and his uncle Phil McConkey, played wide receiver for the New York Giants. McConkey writes "1–20–16" on his towel before games to honor his grandfather Vic McConkey, who died on that date.

McConkey married his high school sweetheart Sydney Horne on April 12, 2025.
