= Kyle Fuller (offensive lineman) =

American football player and coach (born 1994)

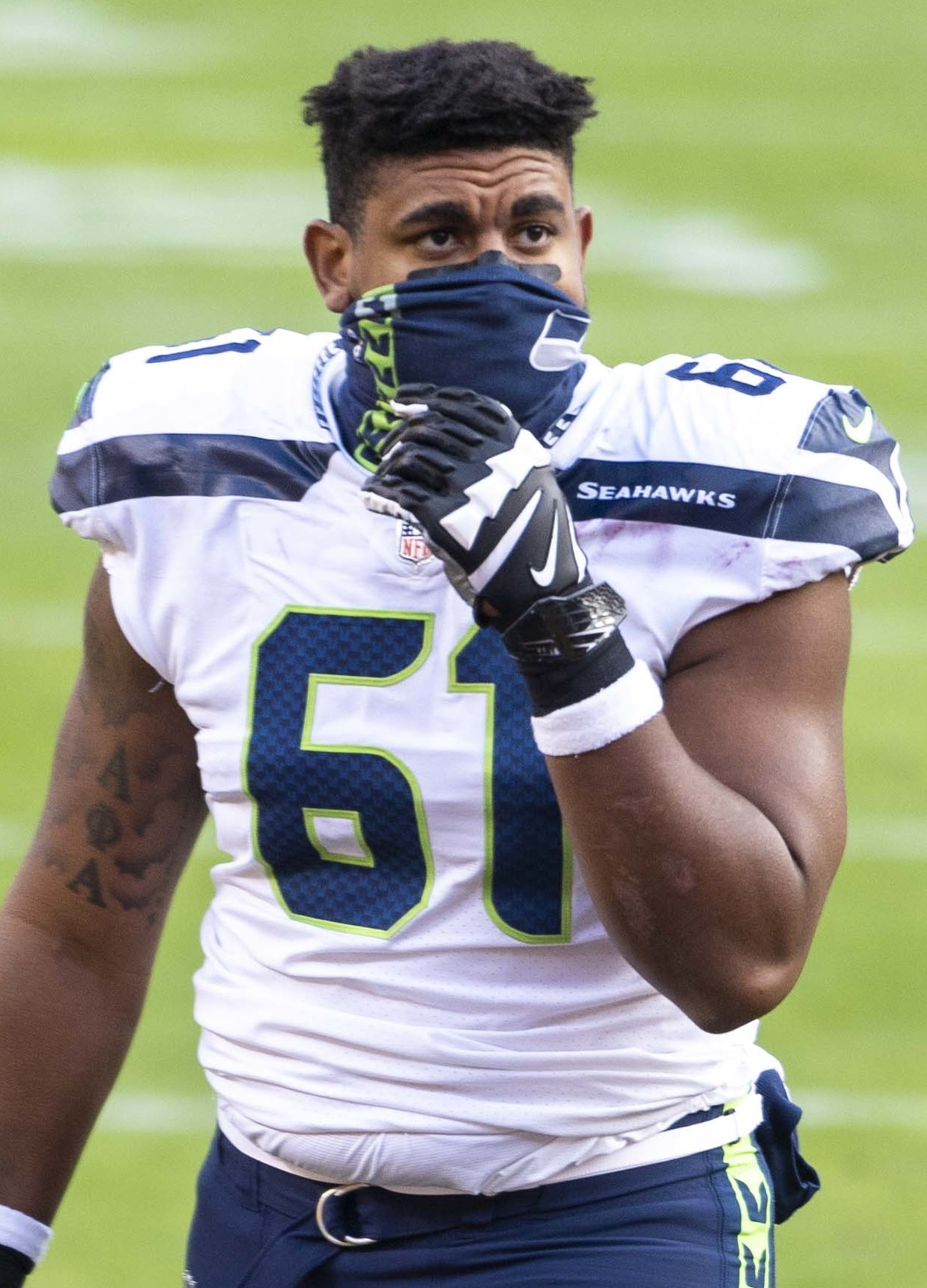
- Fuller with the Seattle Seahawks in 2020

Dallas Cowboys
- Title: Assistant OL/Quality control coach

Personal information
- Born: March 4, 1994 (age 32); Duncanville, Texas, U.S.
- Listed height: 6 ft 5 in (1.96 m)
- Listed weight: 320 lb (145 kg)

Career information
- Position: Center (No. 62, 61)
- High school: Wylie (Wylie, Texas)
- College: Baylor (2012–2016)
- NFL draft: 2017: 7th round, 243rd overall pick

Career history

Playing
- Houston Texans (2017–2018); Washington Redskins (2018); Miami Dolphins (2019)*; Seattle Seahawks (2019–2022); Denver Broncos (2023)*; Baltimore Ravens (2023)*; Michigan Panthers (2024)*
- * Offseason or practice squad member only

Coaching
- North Carolina (2024) Graduate assistant; Appalachian State (2025) Graduate assistant; Las Vegas Raiders (2025) Offensive quality control coach; Dallas Cowboys (2026-present) Assistant OL/Quality control coach

Awards and highlights
- First-team All-Big 12 (2016); Second-team All-Big 12 (2015)

Career NFL statistics
- Games played: 51
- Games started: 12
- Stats at Pro Football Reference

Kyle Emmitt Fuller (born March 4, 1994) is an American former professional football player who was a center in the National Football League (NFL). He played college football for the Baylor Bears and was selected by the Houston Texans in the seventh round of the 2017 NFL draft. He is currently the offensive quality control coach for the Las Vegas Raiders under his former head coach Pete Carroll.

== Early life ==
Fuller was a consensus state top 100 offensive line recruit for Wylie (Texas) High School under head coach Bill Howard. Among all offensive linemen, Fuller was ranked No. 37 by ESPN.com, No. 44 by Rivals.com, No. 53 by Scout.com, and No. 57 by 247Sports.com. He was named to the 2011 second-team DFW Class 4A All-Area, and earned 2011 first-team All-District 10-4A honors. A 3-star offensive tackle recruit, Fuller committed to play college football for Baylor over offers from Arizona, Arkansas, Iowa State, Michigan State, Oklahoma State, Purdue, Texas Tech, and Vanderbilt, among others.

== College career ==
After redshirting in 2012, Fuller played in all 13 games in 2013 as a reserve offensive lineman and on special teams. He went on to start 39 consecutive games at center for Baylor. Fuller was named Honorable Mention All-Big 12 as a redshirt sophomore in 2014; Second Team All-Big 12 as a redshirt junior in 2015; and First Team All-Big 12 as a redshirt senior in 2016. After playing in 52 consecutive games with 39 consecutive starts at center, Fuller graduated from Baylor with a degree in communication studies.

== Professional career ==
Pre-draft measurables
Height	Weight	Arm length	Hand span	Wingspan	40-yard dash	10-yard split	20-yard split	20-yard shuttle	Three-cone drill	Vertical jump	Broad jump	Bench press
6 ft 4 3/4 in (1.95 m)	307 lb (139 kg)	34 1/8 in (0.87 m)	10 1/4 in (0.26 m)	6 ft 7 3/4 in (2.03 m)	5.24 s	1.81 s	3.03 s	4.84 s	7.71 s	26 in (0.66 m)	8 ft 0 in (2.44 m)	23 reps
All values from the NFL Combine

=== Houston Texans ===
Fuller was selected by the Houston Texans in the seventh round with the 243rd overall pick in the 2017 NFL draft. He played in nine games with two starts as a rookie.

On September 1, 2018, Fuller was waived by the Texans and was signed to the practice squad the next day.

=== Washington Redskins ===
On December 11, 2018, Fuller was signed by the Washington Redskins off the Texans practice squad. He was waived on April 30, 2019.

=== Miami Dolphins ===
On May 16, 2019, Fuller signed with the Miami Dolphins. He was released during final roster cuts on August 31, 2019.

=== Seattle Seahawks ===
On September 2, 2019, Fuller was signed to the Seattle Seahawks practice squad. On December 31, 2019, Fuller was promoted to the Seahawks active roster.

Fuller was suspended the first two games of the 2020 season for violating the NFL policy on substances of abuse. He was reinstated from suspension and activated to the roster on September 23, 2020.

Fuller signed an exclusive-rights free agent contract with the Seahawks on April 20, 2021.

Fuller re-signed with the Seahawks on March 18, 2022.

=== Denver Broncos ===
On April 3, 2023, Fuller signed with the Denver Broncos. He was released on August 29, 2023.

=== Baltimore Ravens ===
On September 12, 2023, Fuller signed with the practice squad of the Baltimore Ravens. He was released from their practice squad two weeks later.

=== Michigan Panthers ===
Fuller signed with the Michigan Panthers of the United States Football League on December 21, 2023. He was not part of the roster after the 2024 UFL dispersal draft on January 15, 2024.

== Coaching career ==
On February 11, 2025, the Las Vegas Raiders hired Fuller to serve as an offensive quality control coach following a brief stint with Appalachian State and the University of North Carolina.

On February 10, 2026, Kyle Fuller - Assistant OL/Quality control coach for the Dallas Cowboys. Status: Official, hired

Fuller is one of only two offensive hires in this cycle, thus far, joining Bravo-Brown on Schottenheimer's side of the ball. The 31-year-old knows a thing or two about what it takes to play offensive line in the NFL, considering he did so for quite a while, and for a total of six different teams. His decision to hang up his cleats led him to the coaching ranks for Appalachian State University in 2024, in the same role of assistant offensive line coach, and this marks a homecoming for the former Baylor Bear that earned a two All-Big 12 selections in his time there. Fuller will replace Ramon Chinyoung Sr. and report directly to offensive coordinator Klayton Adams and offensive line coach Conor Riley

26. Feb 10, 2026 at 11:00 AM Patrik Walker DallasCowboys.com Staff Writer
