= Georgia State Route 286 =

State highway in Georgia, United States

State Route 286
- SR 286 highlighted in red

Route information
- Maintained by GDOT
- Length: 10.0 mi (16.1 km)

Major junctions
- West end: US 76 / SR 52 east of Dalton
- SR 225 west of Eton
- East end: US 411 / SR 2 / SR 61 in Eton

Location
- Country: United States
- State: Georgia
- Counties: Whitfield, Murray

Highway system
- Georgia State Highway System; Interstate; US; State; Special
← SR 285	→ SR 287

State Route 286 (SR 286) is a west–east state highway located in the northwestern part of the U.S. state of Georgia. It starts in the west at Whitfield County and ends in the east at Eton in Murray County.

== Route description ==
SR 286 begins at an intersection with US 76/SR 52 east of Dalton in Whitfield County. The route heads north, then turns east, crossing the Conasauga River into Murray County. It continues nearly due east into downtown Eton where it meets its eastern terminus, an intersection with US 411/SR 2/SR 61.

== Major intersections ==
County	Location	mi	km	Destinations	Notes
Whitfield		0.0	0.0	US 76 / SR 52	Western terminus
Whitfield–Murray county line	Conasauga River	5.0	8.0	Crossing over the Conasauga River	
Murray		7.3	11.7	SR 225 – Calhoun	
Murray	Eton	10.0	16.1	US 411 / SR 2 / SR 61	Eastern terminus; roadway continues as CCC Camp Road.
1.000 mi = 1.609 km; 1.000 km = 0.621 mi: Route transition
