= Chris Givens =

American football player (born 1989)

No. 13, 19
- Position: Wide receiver

Personal information
- Born: December 6, 1989 (age 36); Jackson, Mississippi, U.S.
- Listed height: 6 ft 0 in (1.83 m)
- Listed weight: 203 lb (92 kg)

Career information
- High school: Wylie (Wylie, Texas)
- College: Wake Forest (2008–2011)
- NFL draft: 2012: 4th round, 96th overall pick

Career history
- St. Louis Rams (2012–2015); Baltimore Ravens (2015); Philadelphia Eagles (2016)*; Winnipeg Blue Bombers (2017); Memphis Express (2019)*
- * Offseason or practice squad member only

Awards and highlights
- First-team All-ACC (2011)

Career NFL statistics
- Receptions: 107
- Receiving yards: 1,779
- Receiving touchdowns: 5
- Stats at Pro Football Reference

Chris Givens (born December 6, 1989) is an American former professional football player who was a wide receiver in the National Football League (NFL). He was selected by the St. Louis Rams in the fourth round of the 2012 NFL draft. He played college football for the Wake Forest Demon Deacons.

== Early life ==
Givens attended Wylie High School in Wylie, Texas, where he was a two-sport star in football and track. He suffered a torn ACL in his left knee in September 2007 to bring an early close to his high school football career. Rushed for 247 yards and four touchdowns on 30 carries against Hebron in the second game of the 2007 season, but injured his knee the following week in the first quarter against Richardson Berkner.

Givens was regarded as a two-star recruit by Rivals.com, and was a teammate of Patrick Witt.

Also an outstanding track & field athlete, Givens won the District 9-5A 100 meter title in 2007. He was third in the district meet in 2007 in the 200-meter dash with a 22.29 clocking and a member of the district champion 800 meter relay team (1:28.33). He ran a 10.44-second 100-meter dash (electronic) at the Jesuit-Sheaner Relays in 2007. In late January 2008, just 15 weeks after ACL surgery, he clocked a 10.70 in the 100 meters. Also ran a 10.03 100m during the 2008 Region 2-5A meet. He was ranked as high as the fourth fastest in the 100 meters in the Texas high school ranks.

== College career ==
Givens played college football at Wake Forest University from 2009 to 2011. He totaled 629 receiving yards as a redshirt freshman in 2009 and 514 as a redshirt sophomore in 2010. In July 2011, he was placed on the watchlist for the Fred Biletnikoff Award. After catching six passes for 101 yards in Wake Forest's October 2011 win over Florida State, Givens was named the Offensive Receiver of the Week by the Atlantic Coast Conference for the second consecutive week. In the first seven games of the 2011 season, Givens had 46 receptions for 866 yards and eight touchdowns. As of October 23, 2011, Givens's 886 receiving yards during the 2011 season ranked fifth among NCAA Division I FBS players.

=== College statistics ===
		Receiving						Rushing				
Season	Team	GP	Rec	Yds	Avg	LNG	TD	Att	Yds	Avg	LNG	TD
2009	Wake Forest Demon Deacons	12	45	629	14.0	54	8	15	98	6.5	17	0
2010	Wake Forest Demon Deacons	12	35	514	14.7	81	4	16	63	3.9	22	2
2011	Wake Forest Demon Deacons	13	83	1330	16.0	79	9	14	77	5.5	13	0
	Total	37	163	2,473		214	21	45	238		52	2

== Professional career ==
Pre-draft measurables
Height	Weight	Arm length	Hand span	40-yard dash	10-yard split	20-yard split	20-yard shuttle	Three-cone drill	Vertical jump	Broad jump	Bench press	Wonderlic
5 ft 11 in (1.80 m)	198 lb (90 kg)	31 1/4 in (0.79 m)	8 1/4 in (0.21 m)	4.41 s	1.52 s	2.51 s	4.23 s	6.97 s	33 1/2 in (0.85 m)	9 ft 10 in (3.00 m)	19 reps	x
Values from NFL Combine

=== St. Louis Rams ===
==== 2012 season ====
Givens was selected by the St. Louis Rams in the fourth round (96th overall) in the 2012 NFL draft. On June 1, 2012, he signed a four-year contract with the Rams worth $2.6 million. Through the first two games of the regular season, he was held without a reception or a target from the quarterback. Givens would not catch a pass until Week 3 against the Seattle Seahawks, when he beat Seahawks cornerback Richard Sherman for a 52-yard reception.

In a Week 5 win against the Arizona Cardinals, Givens caught a 51-yard pass, resulting in the first touchdown of his NFL career. He would go on to catch a pass of 50-plus yards in five consecutive games from September 30 to October 21, 2012, an NFL rookie record for most consecutive games with a 50-plus yard reception. The receptions came against the Seattle Seahawks, Arizona Cardinals, Miami Dolphins, Green Bay Packers, and New England Patriots. During Week 10 of the regular season, Givens was suspended along with fellow rookie Janoris Jenkins for reportedly violating teams rules. Both players were sidelined and the specifics about their suspensions were never revealed. In Week 12 against the Arizona Cardinals, Givens logged his first 100-plus yard receiving game of his career.

Givens ended his rookie campaign with 42 catches for 698 yards and 3 touchdowns, leading all Rams receivers in receiving yards.

==== 2013 season ====
Despite high expectations heading into the 2013 season, inconsistency at quarterback and poor play by Givens himself resulted in him having a down season. He finished the year with 34 receptions for 569 yards and no touchdowns.

=== Baltimore Ravens ===
On October 3, 2015, Givens was traded to the Baltimore Ravens for a 2017 seventh round draft pick. In a Week 10 game versus the Jacksonville Jaguars, Givens caught a 14-yard touchdown pass for his only score of the season, finishing the game with four catches and 37 receiving yards, but the Ravens lost the game 22–20. Givens would finish the season with 20 receptions for 353 yards and was cut by Baltimore during the offseason.

=== Philadelphia Eagles ===
Givens signed a one-year deal with the Philadelphia Eagles on March 16, 2016. Before the start of the 2016 season, he was released by the team on August 28.

=== Winnipeg Blue Bombers ===
Givens played for the Winnipeg Blue Bombers in 2017.

=== Memphis Express ===
In 2018, Givens signed with the Memphis Express of the Alliance of American Football for the 2019 season. He did not make the final roster.

=== NFL statistics ===
Year	Team	GP	GS	Receiving					Rushing					Fumbles	
Year	Team	GP	GS	Rec	Yds	Avg	Lng	TD	Att	Yds	Avg	Lng	TD	Fum	Lost
2012	STL	15	12	42	698	16.6	65	3	3	12	4.0	14	0	0	0
2013	STL	16	13	34	569	16.7	47	0	3	8	2.7	16	0	1	1
2014	STL	14	0	11	159	14.5	47	1	1	4	4.0	4	0	0	0
2015	STL/BAL	15	6	20	353	17.7	48	1	4	18	4.5	24	1	0	0
Total		60	31	107	1,779	16.6	65	5	11	42	3.8	24	0	1	1
