= Nikita Whitlock =

American football player (born 1991)

No. 49
- Positions: Defensive tackle, running back

Personal information
- Born: May 16, 1991 (age 35); Wylie, Texas, U.S.
- Listed height: 5 ft 10 in (1.78 m)
- Listed weight: 250 lb (113 kg)

Career information
- High school: Wylie
- College: Wake Forest (2009–2013)
- NFL draft: 2014: undrafted

Career history
- Cincinnati Bengals (2014)*; Dallas Cowboys (2014)*; New York Giants (2014–2016); Hamilton Tiger-Cats (2017–2018); Tampa Bay Vipers (2020)
- * Offseason or practice squad member only

Awards and highlights
- First-team All-ACC (2013); Second-team All-ACC (2012)

Career NFL statistics
- Total tackles: 6
- Sacks: 1.0
- Stats at Pro Football Reference
- Stats at CFL.ca

Nikita Nehemiah Whitlock (born May 16, 1991) is an American former professional football player who was a fullback and defensive tackle in the National Football League (NFL), Canadian Football League (CFL) and XFL. He was signed by the Cincinnati Bengals as an undrafted free agent in 2014. Whitlock was also a member of the Dallas Cowboys and New York Giants in the NFL, the Hamilton Tiger-Cats in the CFL, and the Tampa Bay Vipers in the XFL. He played college football for the Wake Forest Demon Deacons.

== Early life ==
Whitlock attended and played football at Wylie High School. He was named the AP Texas Class 5A Defensive Player of the Year in 2008. The Dallas Morning News named him the All-Area Defensive Player of the Year. Whitlock's height made it difficult for him to get noticed by college recruiters.

As a freshman, he was 5 ft 9 in (1.75 m), 175 pounds (79 kg). He grew to 5 ft 10 in (1.78 m), 240 pounds (110 kg) by his senior year. His high school coach, Bill Howard, said, "If he was 6-foot-3, he'd be the No. 1 defensive lineman in the country". Mesquite Horn coach Rodney Webb called Whitlock "the best defensive player he had seen at the high school level". Whitlock set the school bench press record at 405 pounds (184 kg) as a senior. Dallas Morning News sportswriter Matt Wixon called Whitlock "one of the most dominant high school linemen" he has ever seen.

Whitlock had a standout high school career at Wylie High School, earning AP Defensive Player of the Year honors in 2008, after playing defensive tackle and linebacker.

He was offered scholarships to play football for SMU and Northwestern State, and also received interest from TCU and Utah State, before committing to Wake Forest.

== College career ==
External image
- Whitlock at Wake Forest tackling a player during a November 2012 game

Whitlock played college football at Wake Forest from 2009 to 2013. At Wake Forest, Whitlock played nose guard. Whitlock redshirted his freshman year in 2009, practicing as a linebacker.

As a redshirt freshman, he was named second-team freshman All-American by College Football News and Rivals.com. Phil Steele named him fourth team All-ACC in 2012, as well as second-team pre-season All-ACC in 2013. He earned second-team All-ACC defensive honors in 2011 and 2012. In 2013, he was on the Bednarik Award watchlist.

=== College statistics ===
from Wakeforrestsports.com

Year	Team	TT	Solo	Ast	TFL	Sack	PDef	INT	FF	FR
2010	Wake Forest	44	20	24	10½	3	3	0	2	0
2011	Wake Forest	64	26	38	14	3½	1	0	1	0
2012	Wake Forest	51	27	24	5½	3	0	0	0	0
2013	Wake Forest	81	56	25	18	9	3	0	1	0
Career	Totals	240	129	111	48	18½	7	0	4	0

== Professional career ==
Pre-draft measurables
Height	Weight	40-yard dash	10-yard split	20-yard split	20-yard shuttle	Three-cone drill	Vertical jump	Broad jump	Bench press
5 ft 10 in (1.78 m)	251 lb (114 kg)	4.82 s	1.69 s	2.81 s	4.34 s	6.91 s	33 in (0.84 m)	9 ft 0 in (2.74 m)	43 reps
All values from his Pro Day

=== Cincinnati Bengals ===
External image
- Nikita Whitlock catches a pass during warmups before a 2014 pre-season game with the Bengals

On May 12, 2014, Whitlock was signed as an undrafted free agent with the Cincinnati Bengals. Upon signing with the Bengals, Whitlock was moved from defensive tackle to fullback. At 5'10", 250 pounds (110 kg), Whitlock was considered too small to play defensive tackle at the NFL level.

He was released by the Bengals on August 30, 2014.

=== Dallas Cowboys ===
After being released by the Bengals, the Dallas Cowboys signed Whitlock to their practice squad on September 1, 2014. He was then released on September 9. The Cowboys re-signed Whitlock to the practice squad on September 16. He was then released again on November 3.

A week later, Whitlock worked out for the Baltimore Ravens but was not signed. While a free agent, Whitlock was suspended by the NFL for four games on November 21; for violating the policy on performance-enhancing substances.

=== New York Giants ===
On December 17, 2014, Whitlock was signed to the New York Giants practice squad. He worked as both a fullback and a linebacker during practice. On December 29, 2014, Whitlock signed a futures contract with the Giants.

During the 2015 offseason, Whitlock battled incumbent Henry Hynoski for the Giants' fullback spot. Whitlock's positional versatility, as well as being younger and less expensive than Hynoski, allowed him to win the job. In the final preseason game, Whitlock took snaps at both fullback and defensive tackle. He performed dual duty again during the Giants game against the Washington Redskins on September 24, 2015. On December 23, 2015, Whitlock suffered a knee injury in the week 15 game against the Carolina Panthers, and was placed on season-ending injured reserve. He finished the season playing 132 offensive plays, 61 defensive plays, and 276 special teams plays.

On August 30, 2016, Whitlock was waived/injured by the Giants and placed on injured reserve. On September 15, 2016, he was suspended for 10 games for violation of the NFL's PED policy.

After spending the entire 2016 season on injured reserve, Whitlock was not offered a contract by the Giants, making him a free agent.

=== Hamilton Tiger-Cats ===
On August 10, 2017, Whitlock was signed to the practice roster of the Hamilton Tiger-Cats of the Canadian Football League (CFL). He was promoted to the active roster on August 16, 2017. In his first season with the Tiger-Cats Whitlock played in 11 games, making 15 tackles, 9 special teams tackles, and 3 sacks. During his second season in the CFL, Whitlock would begin to also play on offense and became a two-way player like he had in the NFL. Whitlock signed a two-year contract extension in February 2019. Despite signing the contract extension, Whitlock was later released during the 2019 offseason.

=== Tampa Bay Vipers ===
In October 2019, Whitlock was among the open-round selections by the Tampa Bay Vipers in the 2020 XFL draft. In the five games played prior to cancellation due to the COVID-19 pandemic, Whitlock had 19 tackles and a pass knockdown, earning him recognition as one of the top defensive tackles in the XFL by Pro Football Focus. He had his contract terminated when the league suspended operations on April 10, 2020.

== Personal life ==
Whitlock is the son of Raymond and Genny Whitlock. Whitlock was originally going to be named Sergio Nehemiah Whitlock, but his grandmother did not like the name. His father, who worked for Yellow Pages, opened up a phone book to a random page and put his finger down to select his name, ending up with Nikita. Whitlock graduated from Wake Forest with a Health and Exercise Science major.

On December 6, 2016, Whitlock's Moonachie, New Jersey home was subject to vandalism with racially charged graffiti. The perpetrator broke into his home, graffiti-ed several racial slurs and swastikas on his walls, and stole jewelry and electronics.

Whitlock is an ambassador for Up2Us Sports, a national non-profit organization dedicated to supporting underserved youth by providing them with coaches trained in positive youth development.
