= Eno Benjamin =

American football player (born 1999)

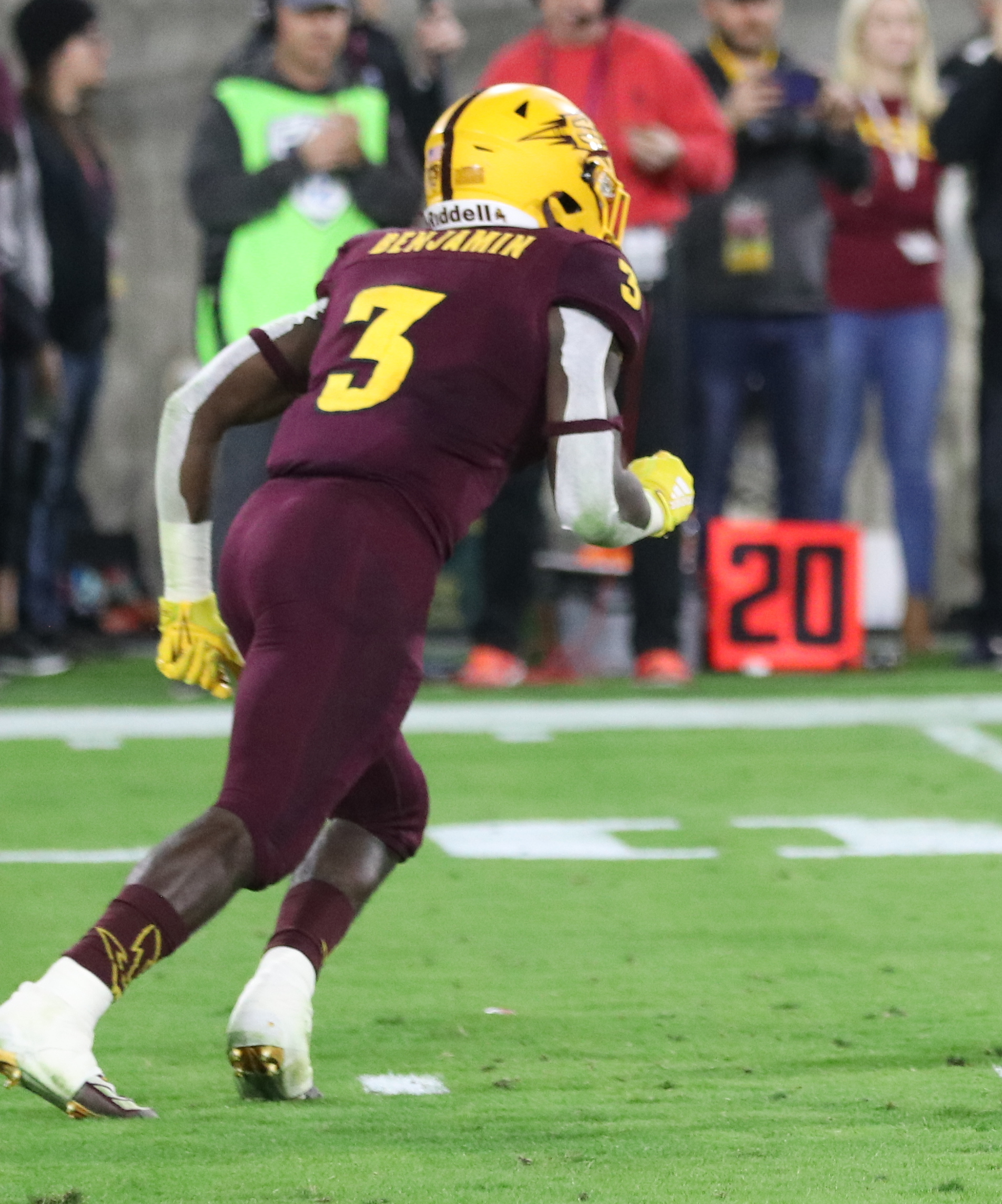
- Benjamin with the Arizona State Sun Devils in 2019

Profile
- Position: Running back

Personal information
- Born: April 13, 1999 (age 27); Dallas, Texas, U.S.
- Listed height: 5 ft 9 in (1.75 m)
- Listed weight: 207 lb (94 kg)

Career information
- High school: Wylie East (Wylie, Texas)
- College: Arizona State (2017–2019)
- NFL draft: 2020: 7th round, 222nd overall pick

Career history
- Arizona Cardinals (2020–2022); Houston Texans (2022); New Orleans Saints (2022–2023); Calgary Stampeders (2025); Montreal Alouettes (2025)

Awards and highlights
- 2× First-team All-Pac-12 (2018, 2019)

Career NFL statistics
- Rushing yards: 431
- Rushing average: 3.9
- Rushing touchdowns: 3
- Receptions: 31
- Receiving yards: 235
- Return yards: 342
- Stats at Pro Football Reference

Enotobong Benjamin (born April 13, 1999) is an American professional football running back. He played college football for the Arizona State Sun Devils and was selected by the Arizona Cardinals in the seventh round of the 2020 NFL draft.

== Early life ==
Benjamin attended Wylie East in Wylie, Texas. During his high school career, he rushed for 7,546 yards and 111 touchdowns. Benjamin originally committed to the University of Iowa to play college football but changed to Arizona State University.

== College career ==
As a true freshman at Arizona State in 2017, Benjamin would play in 10 games, totaling 23 carries for 142 yards and a touchdown. Benjamin also contributed to special teams as a punt returner in 2017, totaling 119 return yards.

During his sophomore season in 2018, he broke the school record for rushing yards in a game with 312. Following his junior year where he rushed for 1,083 yards and 10 touchdowns, Benjamin decided to forgo his senior year and declared for the 2020 NFL draft.

=== Statistics ===
Season	Team	Class	Rushing				Receiving				Scrimmage			
Season	Team	Class	Att	Yds	Avg	TD	Rec	Yds	Avg	TD	Plays	Yds	Avg	TD
2017	Arizona State	FR	23	142	6.2	1	5	15	3.0	0	28	157	5.6	1
2018	Arizona State	SO	300	1642	5.5	16	35	263	7.5	2	335	1905	5.7	18
2019	Arizona State	JR	253	1083	4.3	10	42	347	8.3	2	295	1430	4.8	12
Career			576	2867	5.0	27	82	625	7.6	4	658	3492	5.3	31

== Professional career ==
Pre-draft measurables
Height	Weight	Arm length	Hand span	Wingspan	40-yard dash	10-yard split	20-yard split	20-yard shuttle	Three-cone drill	Vertical jump	Broad jump	Bench press
5 ft 8 7/8 in (1.75 m)	207 lb (94 kg)	31 1/4 in (0.79 m)	8 5/8 in (0.22 m)	6 ft 4 in (1.93 m)	4.57 s	1.53 s	2.69 s	4.25 s	6.97 s	39.0 in (0.99 m)	10 ft 2 in (3.10 m)	12 reps
All values from NFL Combine

=== Arizona Cardinals ===
Benjamin was selected by the Arizona Cardinals with 222nd overall pick in the seventh round of the 2020 NFL draft. He was inactive for every game as a rookie.

Benjamin entered the 2021 season third on the Cardinals depth chart behind Chase Edmonds and James Conner. Filling in for Edmonds in Week 9, Benjamin scored his first NFL rushing touchdown against the San Francisco 49ers. He finished the season with 118 yards and a touchdown through nine games.

On October 2, 2022, during the team's Week 4 game against the Carolina Panthers, Benjamin assumed kickoff duties for the Cardinals in the second half as Matt Prater dealt with hip soreness. On November 14, he was released by the Cardinals after 11 weeks of the season.

=== Houston Texans ===
On November 15, 2022, the Houston Texans claimed Benjamin off waivers. He was released by the Texans on December 13.

=== New Orleans Saints ===
On December 14, 2022, the New Orleans Saints claimed Benjamin off waivers. On August 5, 2023, it was announced that Benjamin had suffered a ruptured Achilles tendon in practice and would miss the entirety of the 2023 season.

=== Calgary Stampeders ===
On April 4, 2025, Benjamin signed with the Calgary Stampeders of the Canadian Football League. He was released on September 4, 2025.

=== Montreal Alouettes ===
On September 9, 2025, Benjamin was signed to the practice roster of the CFL's Montreal Alouettes. He was promoted to the active roster on September 18, and was released on October 23, 2025.
