= Nickelville, Texas =

- Ghost town
- Location within Texas Location within the United States
- Coordinates: 33°01′07″N 96°31′44″W
- Country: United States
- State: Texas
- County: Collin
- Time zone: UTC-6 (Central (CST))
  - Summer (DST): UTC-5 (CDT)
- GNIS feature ID: 2033986

Nickelville is a ghost town in Collin County, located in the U.S. state of Texas.

== History ==
It was reportedly named after the name of the first store, and was organized in the early 1870s. The Gulf, Colorado and Santa Fe Railway laid tracks a half mile north of the original townsite in 1886. The businesses of Nickelville moved to take advantage of the railroad within the following year. The site to where they moved became known as Wylie.
