= North Murray High School =

Public High School in Chatsworth, Georgia, United States

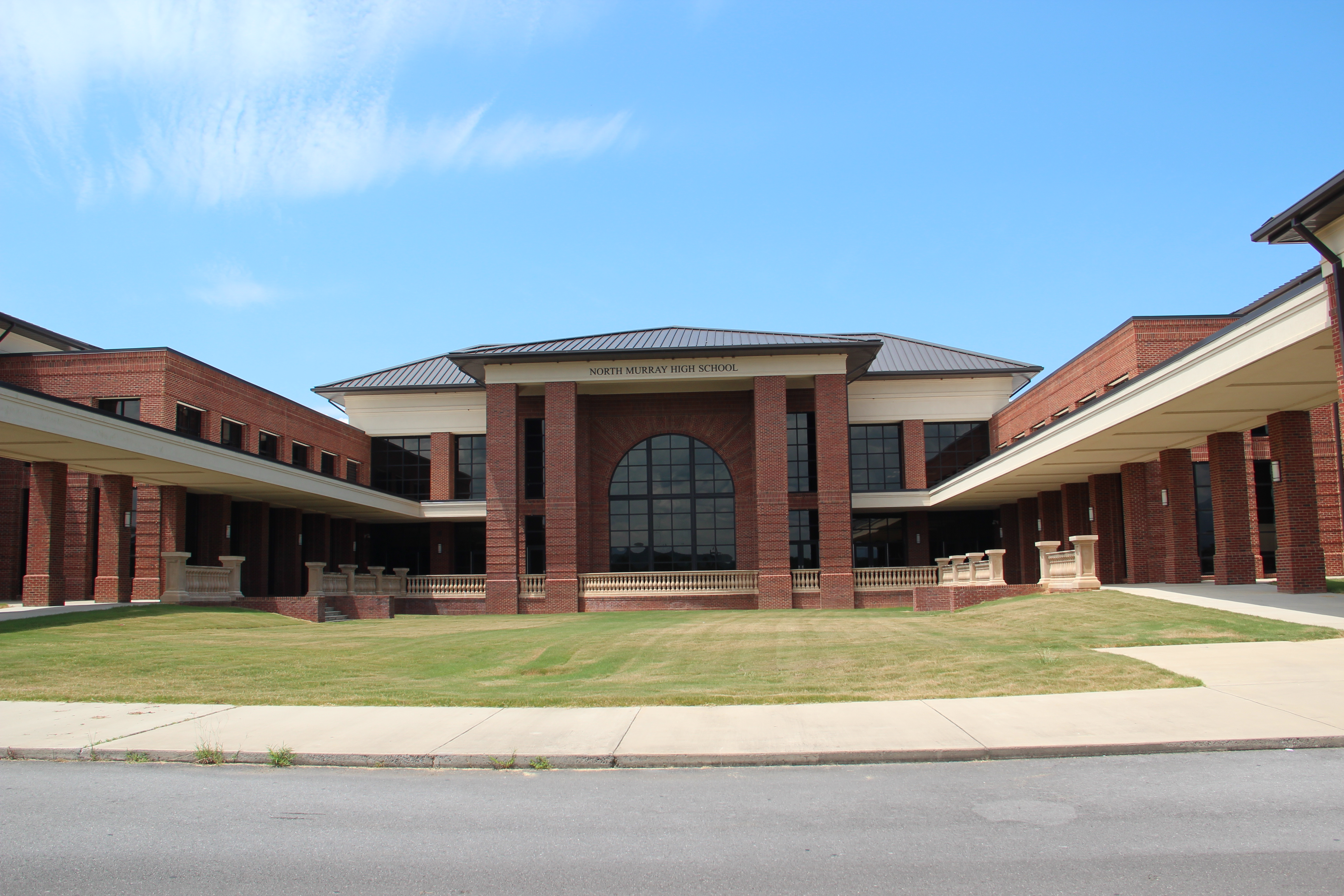

Location
- 2568 Mt. Carmel Church Rd. Chatsworth, Georgia, (Murray County), Georgia 30705; United States; 34.8086°N 84.8092°W

Information
- School type: Public
- Established: September 2010
- Superintendent: Steve Loughridge
- Principal: Donna Eskutt
- Teaching staff: 64.80 (FTE)
- Grades: 9–12
- Enrollment: 999 (2023–2024)
- Average class size: 28
- Student to teacher ratio: 15.42
- Colours: Black and gold
- Fight song: "Go Tell it on the Mountain"
- Athletics: Football, baseball, softball, soccer, band, track, basketball (men's and women's), wrestling (men’s and women’s), tennis, golf, archery
- Mascot: Mountaineer
- Nickname: 'Neers
- Team name: North Murray Mountaineers
- Rival: Murray County High School
- Website: https://www.northmurray.murray.k12.ga.us/o/nmhs

North Murray High School is a high school located in Chatsworth, Murray County, Georgia, United States. It is part of the Murray County School System.

North Murray is the only high school in Georgia to have the Mountaineer as its mascot.

The school colors are black and gold. North Murray High School offers many athletic programs, career pathways, and a host of clubs and extracurricular activities.

The athletics director is Steve Granger, the head football coach is Coach Preston Poag, and the offensive coordinator for football is Cody Rainey. The head boys' basketball coach is Tim Ellis, the head girls' basketball coach is Randy Watson, the track coach is Kyle Trego, the field coach is Jacob Ledford, and the head golf coach is Cody Rainey. Seth Hickman coaches baseball, and the head softball coach is Steve Granger. Amanda Bynum is the head tennis coach, Matt Chambers coaches the boys' soccer team, and Rolando Ambriz coaches the girls' soccer team.

In 2012, the Mountaineer archery team won the school's second state championship.

In 2016, the Mountaineer football team made the state playoffs for the first time in school history, with a record of 9–3.

== Notable alumni ==
- Ladd McConkey - wide receiver for the Los Angeles Chargers
