= Eton, Georgia =

- City
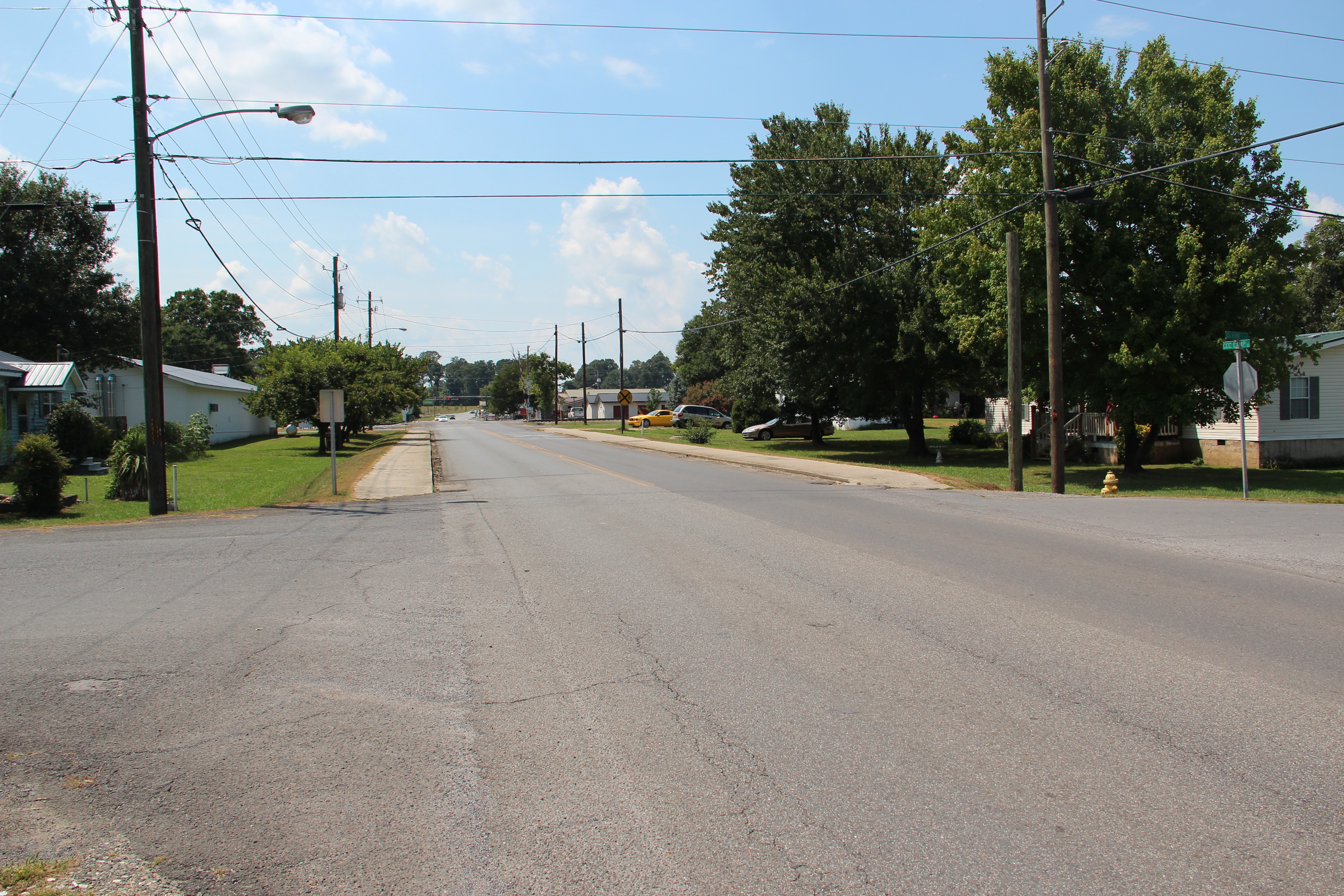
- Street in Eton

- Location in Murray County and the state of Georgia
- Coordinates: 34°49′21″N 84°45′43″W
- Country: United States
- State: Georgia
- County: Murray

Area
  - Total: 1.28 sq mi (3.32 km^{2})
  - Land: 1.28 sq mi (3.32 km^{2})
  - Water: 0 sq mi (0.00 km^{2})
- Elevation: 748 ft (228 m)

Population (2020)
  - Total: 824
  - Density: 643.5/sq mi (248.47/km^{2})
- Time zone: UTC-5 (Eastern (EST))
  - Summer (DST): UTC-4 (EDT)
- ZIP code: 30724
- Area codes: 706/762
- FIPS code: 13-27932
- GNIS feature ID: 0331673
- Website: www.etongeorgia.com

Eton is a town in Murray County, Georgia, United States. It is part of the Dalton, Georgia Metropolitan Statistical Area. The population was 824 at the 2020 census, down from 910 in 2010.

== History ==
A post office called Eton has been in operation since 1906. The community's name is most likely a transfer from Eton College, in England.

== Geography ==
Eton is located north of the center of Murray County at 34°49′21″N 84°45′43″W (34.822554, -84.761826). U.S. Route 411 passes through the center of town, leading south 4 miles (6 km) to Chatsworth, the county seat, and north 21 miles (34 km) to Ocoee, Tennessee. Georgia State Route 286 leads west from Eton 7 miles (11 km) to Dawnville.

According to the United States Census Bureau, Eton has a total area of 1.3 square miles (3.4 km^{2}), all land. Mill Creek runs through the southern part of the town, flowing west toward the Conasauga River. 1,030-foot (310 m) Camp Ground Mountain rises above the town to the south.

== Demographics ==
Historical population
Census	Pop.	Note	%±
1910	307		—
1920	313		2.0%
1930	259		−17.3%
1940	239		−7.7%
1950	297		24.3%
1960	275		−7.4%
1970	286		4.0%
1980	301		5.2%
1990	315		4.7%
2000	319		1.3%
2010	910		185.3%
2020	824		−9.5%
U.S. Decennial Census

As of the census of 2000, there were 319 people, 123 households, and 93 families residing in the town. The population density was 762.1 inhabitants per square mile (294.2/km^{2}). There were 131 housing units at an average density of 313.0 per square mile (120.8/km^{2}). The racial makeup of the town was 94.04% White, 0.31% Asian, 4.39% from other races, and 1.25% from two or more races. Hispanic or Latino people of any race were 11.29% of the population.

There were 123 households, out of which 35.0% had children under the age of 18 living with them, 56.9% were married couples living together, 15.4% had a female householder with no husband present, and 23.6% were non-families. 18.7% of all households were made up of individuals, and 5.7% had someone living alone who was 65 years of age or older. The average household size was 2.59 and the average family size was 2.87.

The population was spread out, with 24.8% under the age of 18, 8.5% from 18 to 24, 34.2% from 25 to 44, 22.6% from 45 to 64, and 10.0% who were 65 years of age or older. The median age was 35 years. For every 100 females, there were 84.4 males. For every 100 females age 18 and over, there were 86.0 males.

The median income for a household was $39,250, and the median income for a family was $46,389. Males had a median income of $31,625 versus $22,813 for females. The per capita income for the city was $17,777. About 3.3% of families and 4.4% of the population were below the poverty line, including none of those under age 18 and 2.4% of those age 65 or over.
