= St. Paul, Collin County, Texas =

St. Paul, Texas
- Town
- Location of St. Paul in Collin County, Texas
- Coordinates: 33°2′30″N 96°32′45″W
- Country: United States
- State: Texas
- Counties: Collin

Area
  - Total: 1.44 sq mi (3.72 km^{2})
  - Land: 1.43 sq mi (3.71 km^{2})
  - Water: 0.0039 sq mi (0.01 km^{2})
- Elevation: 558 ft (170 m)

Population (2020)
  - Total: 992
  - Density: 693/sq mi (267/km^{2})
- Time zone: UTC-6 (Central (CST))
  - Summer (DST): UTC-5 (CDT)
- Area codes: 214, 469, 945, 972
- FIPS code: 48-64220
- GNIS feature ID: 2412597
- Website: www.stpaultexas.us

St. Paul is a town in Collin County, Texas, United States. The population was 992 at the 2020 census.

== Geography ==
St. Paul is located in southern Collin County and is bordered to the west, south, and east by the city of Wylie. The city of Lucas is to the north.

According to the United States Census Bureau, the town has a total area of 1.5 square miles (4.0 km^{2}), of which 0.004 square miles (0.01 km^{2}), or 0.34%, is covered by water.

== Demographics ==
Historical population
Census	Pop.	Note	%±
1980	363		—
1990	415		14.3%
2000	630		51.8%
2010	1,066		69.2%
2020	992		−6.9%
U.S. Decennial Census

St. Paul racial composition as of 2020 (NH = Non-Hispanic) (Note: Note: the US Census treats Hispanic/Latino as an ethnic category. This table excludes Latinos from the racial categories and assigns them to a separate category. Hispanics/Latinos can be of any race.)
Race	Number	Percentage
White (NH)	730	73.59%
Black or African American (NH)	9	0.91%
Native American or Alaska Native (NH)	4	0.4%
Asian (NH)	24	2.42%
Some Other Race (NH)	4	0.4%
Mixed/Multi-Racial (NH)	60	6.05%
Hispanic or Latino	161	16.23%
Total	992	

As of the 2020 United States census, there were 992 people, 239 households, and 201 families residing in the town.
