= Nickelsville, Georgia =

Unincorporated community in Georgia, United States

Coordinates: 34°36′06″N 84°52′01″W

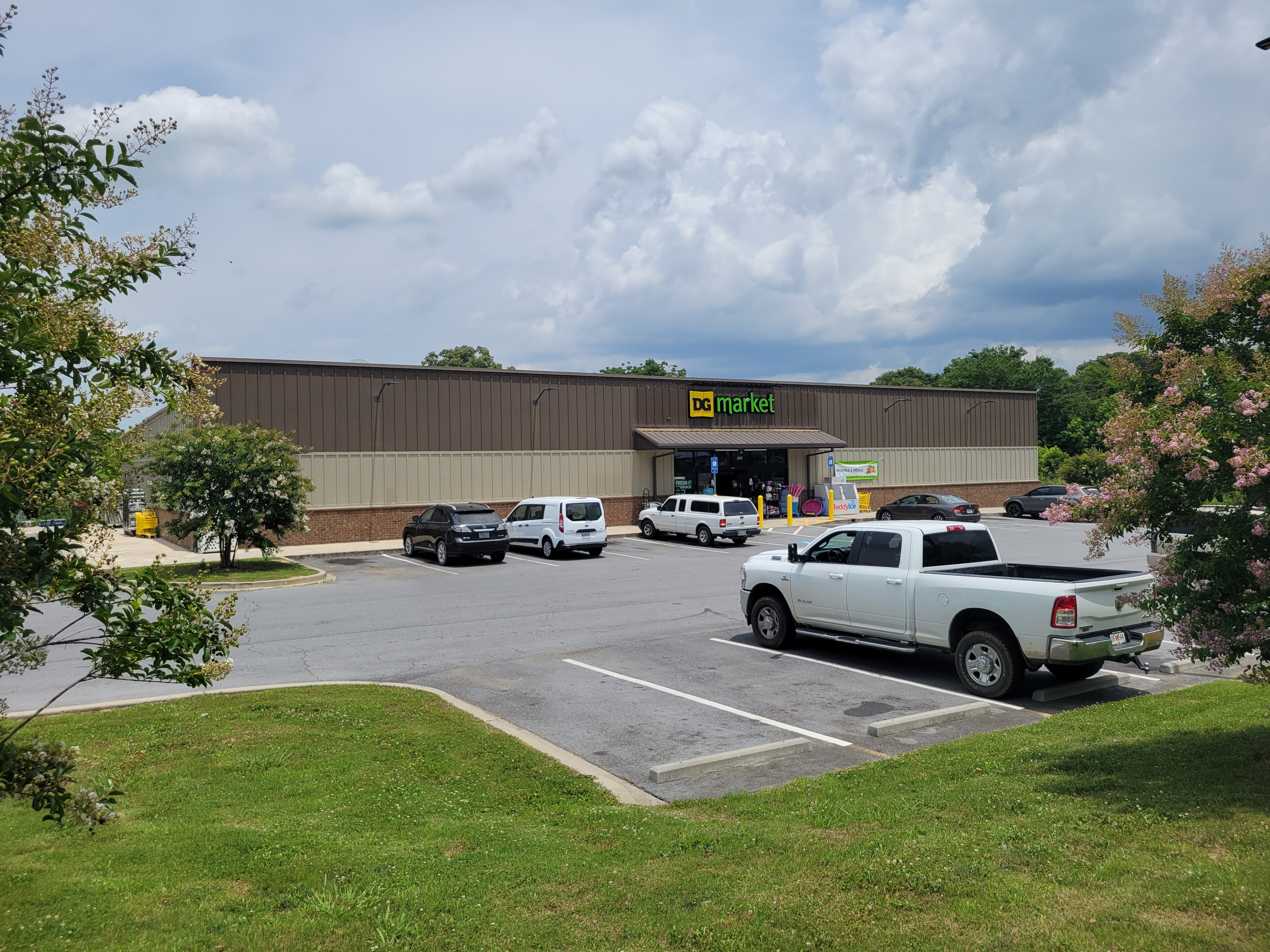
Dollar General

Nickelsville (formerly Nicholsville) is an unincorporated community in Gordon County, in the U.S. state of Georgia.

== History ==
The community was named in honor of Lawrence Nichols. An early variant name was "Little Five Points".
