= Wylie, Texas =

Wylie, Texas Nickelville (former)
- City
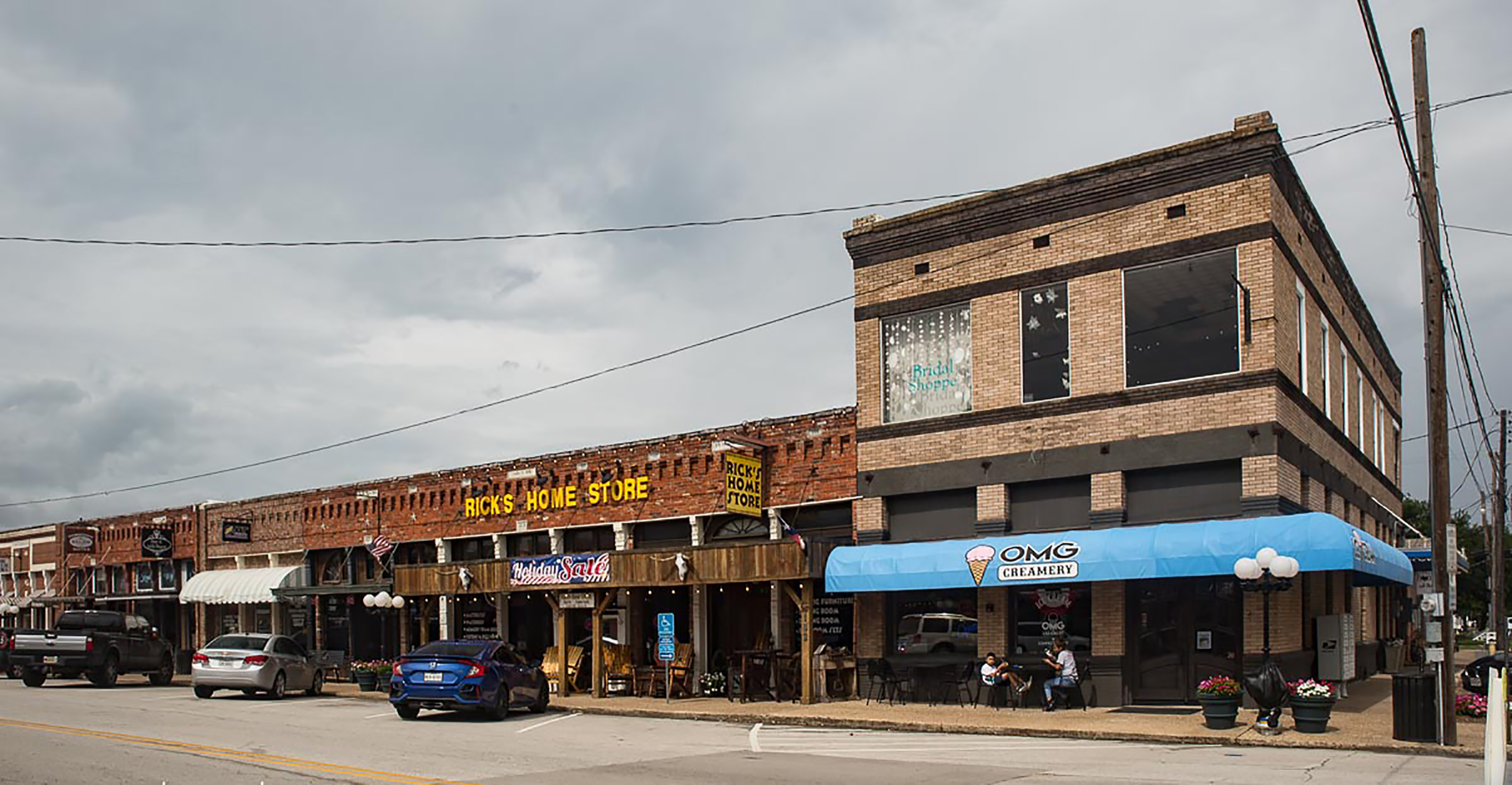
- Downtown Wylie

- Location of Wylie in Collin County, Texas
- Coordinates: 33°02′10″N 96°30′58″W
- Country: United States of America
- State: Texas
- Counties: Collin, Dallas, Rockwall
- Established: November 1887

Government
  - Type: Council-Manager
  - City Council: Mayor Matthew Porter; David R. Duke; Mayor pro tem Gino Mulliqi; Dave Strang; Todd J. Pickens; Scott Williams; Sid Hoover

Area
  - Total: 37.29 sq mi (96.57 km^{2})
  - Land: 22.06 sq mi (57.13 km^{2})
  - Water: 15.23 sq mi (39.45 km^{2})
- Elevation: 518 ft (158 m)

Population (2020)
  - Total: 57,526
  - Density: 2,406.0/sq mi (928.95/km^{2})
- Time zone: UTC-6 (Central (CST))
  - Summer (DST): UTC-5 (CDT)
- ZIP code: 75098
- Area codes: 214, 469, 945, 972
- FIPS code: 48-80356
- GNIS feature ID: 2412311
- Website: City of Wylie Official Website

Wylie is a city and northeastern suburb of Dallas, that was once solely located in Collin County, but now extends into neighboring Dallas and Rockwall counties in the U.S. state of Texas. It is located on State Route 78 about 24 miles (39 km) northeast of central Dallas and centrally located between nearby Lavon Lake and Lake Ray Hubbard.

As of the 2020 census, Wylie had a population of 57,526.

== History ==
Originally called Nickelville, reportedly after the name of the first store, it was organized in the early 1870s. The Gulf, Colorado and Santa Fe Railway laid tracks a half mile north of the original townsite in 1886. The businesses of Nickelville moved to take advantage of the railroad within the following year, and the City of Wylie was incorporated in 1887 along the right-of-way. It was named for Lt. Colonel William D. Wylie, a right-of-way agent for the railroad and Civil War veteran.

That same year, Wylie had given itself its name, established a post office branch, and incorporated, choosing an alderman form of government. Two years later, the St. Louis Southwestern Railway reached the town. The two railroads and the rich agricultural region of the Blackland Prairies contributed to the town's growth. In 1890, Wylie had a population of 400 and the first one-room school house was built. By 1900, it had grown to 773. In the next decade, the population tripled. Before 1920, the community had over 35 businesses, including two banks, a school, and a weekly newspaper.

Unlike many rural Texas communities, Wylie grew during the Great Depression years, reaching 914 residents by 1940. In part, this was a result of increased dairy farming to meet the demands of nearby Dallas. Following World War II, the population increase continued.

Onions were the town's cash crop in the 1930s and 1940s. "Wide Awake Wylie" became the city's nickname in the late 1940s and 1950s, a result of late night get-togethers of its citizens and businesses that stayed open until midnight on some evenings.

Designed to provide water for towns in four counties, the construction of the Lavon Dam and Reservoir 5 miles (8 km) north of town, and the selection of Wylie to house the offices of the North Texas Municipal Water District, pushed the population to 1,804 in 1960.

In the 1990s, Wylie had two disasters. On May 9, 1993 (Mother's Day), a tornado ravaged downtown Wylie. In December 1998, two fires destroyed and damaged several businesses. After that, the downtown area was renovated, while preserving the many century-old buildings that remained standing. On April 11, 2016, a hail storm struck Wylie that produced softball-sized hailstones and damaged an estimated 80% of homes in the city, causing over $240 million in damage.

== Geography ==
According to the United States Census Bureau, the city has a total area of 35.317 square miles, of which 21.037 square miles are land and 14.280 square miles, or 40.43%, are covered by water. Wylie is part of the subtropical region, with hot, dry summers and cold, mild, rainy winters.

=== Climate ===
Climate data for Lavon Dam, Texas (1991–2020 normals, extremes 1953–2019)
Month	Jan	Feb	Mar	Apr	May	Jun	Jul	Aug	Sep	Oct	Nov	Dec	Year
Record high °F (°C)	84 (29)	96 (36)	95 (35)	97 (36)	99 (37)	111 (44)	109 (43)	108 (42)	111 (44)	100 (38)	88 (31)	87 (31)	111 (44)
Mean daily maximum °F (°C)	53.7 (12.1)	58.2 (14.6)	65.1 (18.4)	73.0 (22.8)	80.2 (26.8)	88.3 (31.3)	92.4 (33.6)	93.3 (34.1)	86.7 (30.4)	76.7 (24.8)	64.7 (18.2)	56.1 (13.4)	74.0 (23.3)
Daily mean °F (°C)	44.0 (6.7)	48.2 (9.0)	55.7 (13.2)	63.2 (17.3)	71.4 (21.9)	79.3 (26.3)	82.8 (28.2)	83.1 (28.4)	76.3 (24.6)	65.8 (18.8)	54.6 (12.6)	46.1 (7.8)	64.2 (17.9)
Mean daily minimum °F (°C)	34.2 (1.2)	38.1 (3.4)	46.4 (8.0)	53.4 (11.9)	62.6 (17.0)	70.3 (21.3)	73.2 (22.9)	73.0 (22.8)	65.9 (18.8)	54.8 (12.7)	44.6 (7.0)	36.0 (2.2)	54.4 (12.4)
Record low °F (°C)	3 (−16)	7 (−14)	12 (−11)	28 (−2)	37 (3)	49 (9)	58 (14)	48 (9)	36 (2)	26 (−3)	14 (−10)	−3 (−19)	−3 (−19)
Average precipitation inches (mm)	2.58 (66)	2.71 (69)	3.54 (90)	3.68 (93)	4.74 (120)	4.13 (105)	1.87 (47)	2.15 (55)	3.10 (79)	4.42 (112)	3.42 (87)	3.45 (88)	39.79 (1,011)
Average snowfall inches (cm)	0.0 (0.0)	0.0 (0.0)	0.0 (0.0)	0.0 (0.0)	0.0 (0.0)	0.0 (0.0)	0.0 (0.0)	0.0 (0.0)	0.0 (0.0)	0.0 (0.0)	0.0 (0.0)	0.2 (0.51)	0.2 (0.51)
Average precipitation days (≥ 0.01 in)	8.0	7.4	8.6	7.5	9.4	7.9	5.5	5.2	6.0	7.0	7.3	8.0	87.8
Average snowy days (≥ 0.1 in)	0.0	0.0	0.0	0.0	0.0	0.0	0.0	0.0	0.0	0.0	0.0	0.2	0.2
Source: NOAA

== Demographics ==
Historical population
Census	Pop.	Note	%±
1890	239		—
1900	773		223.4%
1910	620		−19.8%
1920	945		52.4%
1930	771		−18.4%
1940	914		18.5%
1950	1,295		41.7%
1960	1,804		39.3%
1970	2,675		48.3%
1980	3,152		17.8%
1990	8,716		176.5%
2000	15,132		73.6%
2010	41,427		173.8%
2020	57,526		38.9%
2024 (est.)	62,954		9.4%
U.S. Decennial Census

=== 2020 census ===
As of the 2020 census, Wylie had a population of 57,526. The median age was 34.7 years. 30.6% of residents were under the age of 18 and 8.8% of residents were 65 years of age or older. For every 100 females there were 92.9 males, and for every 100 females age 18 and over there were 89.5 males age 18 and over.

99.9% of residents lived in urban areas, while 0.1% lived in rural areas.

There were 17,957 households in Wylie, of which 50.9% had children under the age of 18 living in them. Of all households, 64.5% were married-couple households, 10.5% were households with a male householder and no spouse or partner present, and 20.5% were households with a female householder and no spouse or partner present. About 14.0% of all households were made up of individuals and 5.0% had someone living alone who was 65 years of age or older.

There were 18,507 housing units, of which 3.0% were vacant. The homeowner vacancy rate was 1.0% and the rental vacancy rate was 5.6%.

Racial composition as of the 2020 census
Race	Number	Percent
White	31,872	55.4%
Black or African American	7,927	13.8%
American Indian and Alaska Native	472	0.8%
Asian	5,743	10.0%
Native Hawaiian and Other Pacific Islander	55	0.1%
Some other race	4,685	8.1%
Two or more races	6,772	11.8%
Hispanic or Latino (of any race)	11,260	19.6%

=== 2010 census ===
As of the 2010 census the population was 41,427. The city grew 173.8% between the 2000 census and 2010.

=== 2000 census ===
At the 2000 census there were 15,132 people, 5,085 households, and 4,108 families residing in the city. The population density was 781.2 inhabitants per square mile (301.6/km^{2}). The 5,326 housing units averaged 275.0 units per square mile (106.2 units/km^{2}).

The racial makeup of the city was 90.45% White, 2.07% African American, 0.70% Native American, 0.60% Asian, 0.03% Pacific Islander, 4.30% from other races, and 1.86% from two or more races. Hispanics or Latinos of any race were 10.44% of the population.

Of the 5,085 households in 2000, 50.7% had children under the age of 18 living with them, 64.9% were married couples living together, 11.2% had a female householder with no husband present, and 19.2% were not families. About 15.3% of all households were made up of individuals, and 4.2% had someone living alone who was 65 years of age or older. The average household size was 2.96 and the average family size was 3.29.

In the city, the population was distributed as 33.4% under the age of 18, 7.2% from 18 to 24, 37.6% from 25 to 44, 15.9% from 45 to 64, and 5.9% who were 65 years of age or older. The median age was 31 years. For every 100 females, there were 97.4 males. For every 100 females age 18 and over, there were 94.9 males.

In 2000, the median income for a household in the city was $58,393, and for a family was $62,903. Males had a median income of $44,239 versus $31,084 for females. The per capita income for the city was $22,987. About 2.4% of families and 3.4% of the population were below the poverty line, including 3.3% of those under age 18 and 3.4% of those age 65 or over.

== Government ==
Wylie has a council-manager form of government, composed of a mayor and six council members (elected at large) along with an appointed city manager. The city has operated under a city charter (home rule) since 1985, when voters approved the measure in a referendum. The city of Wylie is a voluntary member of the North Central Texas Council of Governments association, the purpose of which is to coordinate individual and collective local governments and facilitate regional solutions, eliminate unnecessary duplication, and enable joint decisions.

== Education ==
Most of the Collin County portion of Wylie is served by Wylie Independent School District. Small portions in Collin County are served by Community Independent School District, Plano Independent School District, and Princeton Independent School District. The Dallas County portion is served by Garland Independent School District. The Rockwall County portion is served by Rockwall Independent School District.

As of August 2025, Wylie has 12 elementary schools, 3 intermediate schools, 3 junior high schools, and 3 high schools, including Achieve Academy. An intermediate and junior high school are expected to be completed by the Fall 2026 school year. Collin College opened its new Wylie campus in August 2020 that can service up to 7,500 students at full capacity.

== Transportation ==
Wylie is served by these highways:

- State Highway 78
- Farm to Market 544
- Farm to Market 1378
- Farm to Market 2514
- Farm to Market 3412

Kansas City Southern provides freight rail services (its line roughly parallels State Highway 78) and operates an intermodal facility in the city.

== Notable people ==
- Eno Benjamin, running back for the Calgary Stampeders of the Canadian Football League
- Joe Eisma, comic artist for Image Comics, DC Comics and Archie Comics
- Kyle Fuller, former NFL offensive lineman
- Jackie Galloway, bronze medalist in taekwondo at the 2016 Summer Olympics in Rio de Janeiro, Brazil
- Chris Givens, former NFL wide receiver
- Bill Harris, Major League Baseball pitcher
- Colton Tapp, Actor from Walker (TV series) and The Gandhi Murder
- Braden Shewmake, MLB shortstop for the New York Yankees
- Victor Ulloa, former MLS defensive midfielder
- Nikita Whitlock, former NFL fullback
- Nathan Yocum, film producer and publisher
- Clay Cooper, 2023 Texas Country Music Hall of Fame inductee

== Twin towns – sister cities ==
- North Mitrovica, Kosovo

== See also ==
- A Killing in a Small Town, 1990 television film
- Candy, 2022 streaming TV miniseries
- Love & Death, 2023 streaming TV miniseries
