= National Register of Historic Places listings in Gilmer County, Georgia =

Location of Gilmer County in Georgia.

This is a list of properties and districts in Gilmer County, Georgia that are listed on the National Register of Historic Places (NRHP). There is one listing, and one former listing.

This National Park Service list is complete through NPS recent listings posted June 6, 2026.

== Current listings ==
	Name on the Register	Image	Date listed	Location	City or town	Description
1	Cartecay Methodist Church and Cemetery	Cartecay Methodist Church and Cemetery	April 19, 2001 (#01000383)	Junction of State Route 52 and Roy Rd. 34°38′39″N 84°23′24″W	Ellijay	

== Former listings ==
	Name on the Register	Image	Date listed	Date removed	Location	City or town	Description
1	Gilmer County Courthouse	Gilmer County Courthouse	September 18, 1980 (#80001081)	June 10, 2026	Courthouse Sq. 34°41′42″N 84°29′00″W	Ellijay	Demolished in 2008.
