= North Georgia =

Geographic region of the U.S. state of Georgia

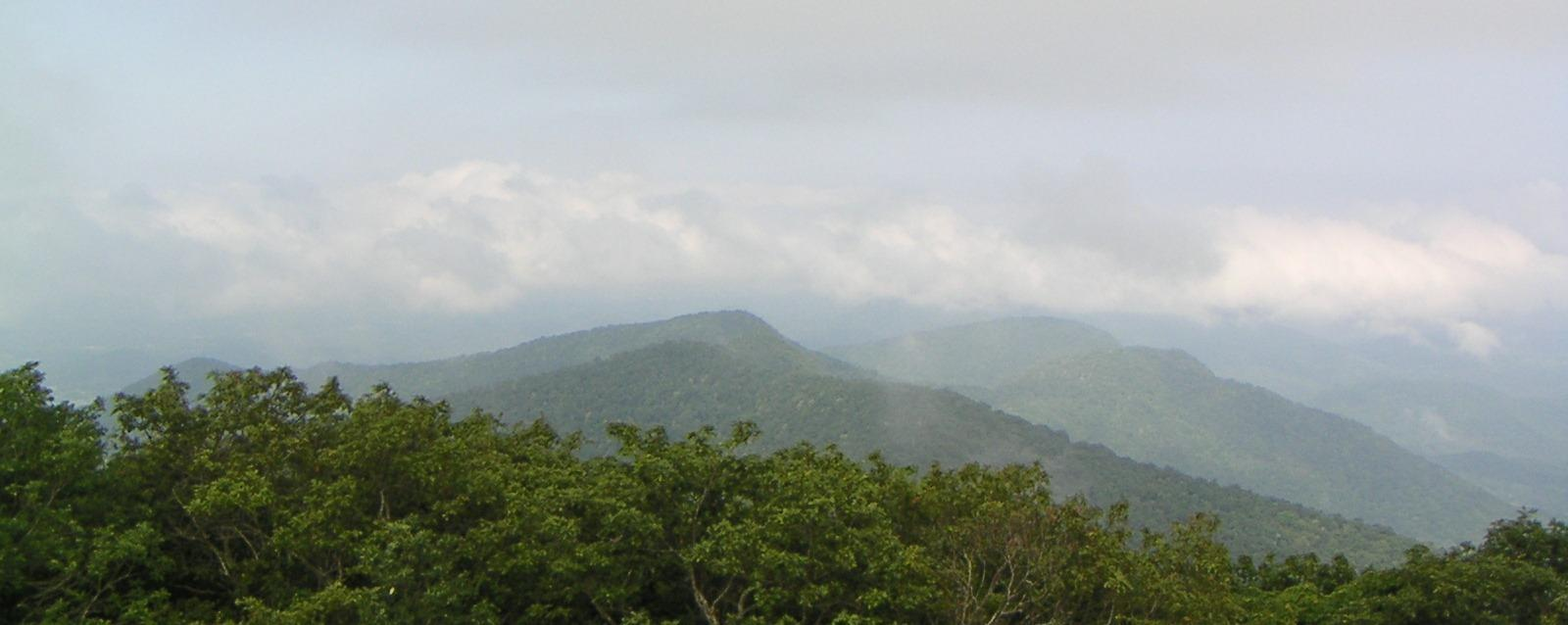
The North Georgia mountains around Helen, Georgia

North Georgia is the northern hilly/mountainous region in the U.S. state of Georgia. At the time of the arrival of settlers from Europe, it was inhabited largely by the Cherokee. The counties of north Georgia were often scenes of important events in the history of Georgia. It was the site of many American Civil War battles, including the Battle of Lookout Mountain and the Battle of Chickamauga, leading up to the Atlanta campaign. Today, particularly in the northeast portion of the region, tourism sustains the local economy.

== Geography ==
North Georgia encompasses the north Georgia mountains (far northeast and northwest) region of the state and the Atlanta metropolitan area, although the term is often used to describe only the region north of the metro area, especially in newscasts from the Atlanta media market (which reach nearly all of the northern third of the state). To the south lies central Georgia, with upstate South Carolina to the east, western North Carolina to the northeast, East Tennessee to the north, and northeast Alabama to the west. Part of metropolitan Chattanooga extends into the far northwestern section of Georgia from Tennessee, while most of the rest of the region is tied to Atlanta-area mass media.

The highest of Georgia's Appalachian Mountains are near the North Carolina border, including Brasstown Bald, the highest point in the state. The northwest contains part of the eastern Tennessee seismic zone, and small earthquakes have been felt as far away as Atlanta. The foothills gradually flatten out toward the south. Much of metro Atlanta is hilly as well, especially on the north and west.

Major rivers include the upper Chattahoochee River, upper Savannah River, Etowah River, far upper Flint River, upper Coosa River, and upper Oconee River. Smaller tributary rivers are the Little River, Chestatee River, Chattooga River, Tallulah River, Tugalo River, Oostanaula River, Coosawattee River, Cartecay River, Ellijay River, Conasauga River, Toccoa River, Sweetwater Creek, upper Tallapoosa River, upper Yellow River, Nottely River, and small headwaters of the far upper Hiawassee River and Little Tennessee River. Were it not for a 19th-century surveying error that failed to place the state's northern border at exactly 35°N, it would also touch the Tennessee River.

== Climate ==
Throughout North Georgia, average temperatures can change drastically at elevations of 700 feet (210 m) or more above sea level. At these elevations the average summer (from May 31 to September 30) temperature is about 80 °F or 26.7 °C during the afternoon and around 67 °F or 19.4 °C during the morning. Daytime in summer can be hot, often stormy, and humid, whilst nights can be rainy and humid, rarely with temperatures below 65 °F or 18.3 °C. The average winter temperature (from December 1 to March 1) is about 39 °F or 3.9 °C during the afternoon and around 24 °F or −4.4 °C during the morning. Daytime in winter can be humid, windy, and cold, while nights can be frigid and humid. Snow can fall annually anywhere above 800 to 900 feet (240 to 270 m), with a large blizzard typically happening every couple of years and more typically 1 to 5 inches (0.025 to 0.13 m) annually.

== Notable North Georgia locations ==
- Chattahoochee-Oconee National Forest
- Waterfalls of North Georgia
- Tallulah Gorge
- Clayton, Georgia
- Chickamauga National Military Park – oldest and largest military park in the NPS
- Rabun Bald
- Chattooga River
- Helen, Georgia – an old time tourist attraction town modeled on a small hamlet in Bavaria, Germany
- Unicoi State Park
- New Echota – former capital of the Cherokee Nation
- Dahlonega, Georgia – site of the University of North Georgia and the first American gold rush in the late 1820s
- Ringgold, Georgia
- Rome, Georgia
- Canton, Georgia
- Jasper, Georgia – home of the Marble Festival
- Ellijay, Georgia
- Blue Ridge, Georgia
- Blairsville, Georgia – home of the Sorghum Festival
- Dalton, Georgia – an important carpet-producing city
- Athens, Georgia – home of The University of Georgia, the oldest state-chartered university in the United States
- Chickamauga, Georgia
- LaFayette, Georgia

== See also ==
- Northeast Georgia
- Northwest Georgia
- Upland South
- List of Appalachian Regional Commission counties#Georgia
- Shallowford Bridge
