= Bell Field Mound Site =

Archaeological site in Murray County, Georgia, US

Bell Field Mound
- Location within Georgia today
- 34°36′35.14″N 84°40′53.11″W
- Cultures: South Appalachian Mississippian culture
- Location: Murray County, Georgia, USA
- Region: Murray County, Georgia

Bell Field Mound Site (9MU101) is an archaeological site located on the western bank of the Coosawattee River below the Coosawatee’s junction with Talking Rock Creek. The site itself was destroyed by the construction of Carters Dam in the 1970s. With respect to the dam itself, Bell Field was located in front of the high dam along with the Sixtoe Mound and Little Egypt sites.

== Excavation history ==
Excavations of the Bell Field site were carried-out in the late 1960s and the early 1970s by Arthur Randolph Kelly. At this time, Kelly was affiliated with the University of Georgia and all excavations of Bell Field were done in partnership with the University as well as the National Park Service and Army Corps of Engineers. Field seasons were primarily in the summer months, where both local volunteers and University students assisted with the work. Archaeological investigations of the Bell Field site at this time were performed as salvage excavations to uncover any important artifacts or features that may have been lost to the construction of Carters Dam. Work done at the Bell Field site focused mainly on the central mound structures, with little attention paid to the surrounding village area.

== Site components and features ==
Bell Field consisted of a central mound structure, flanked on its sides by terraces situated on the Coosawatee’s natural levees. The mound deposit itself showed stratification of artifacts and horizons associated with cycles of construction as well as the presence of four buildings atop the mound during its uppermost level of occupation. The general stratigraphy of the central mound showed a transition from a pure Dallas occupation to a mixed Dallas-Lamar one in its most terminal layers, which was expressed through eight levels of construction and occupation.

It also contained several units of conjoined, auxiliary buildings connected by passageways immediately around the central mound complex. Among these buildings examined near the core mound was a “council-house” structure (just north of the mound) with a central hearth, circularly-oriented and tiered seats, and associated auxiliary quarters.

The portion of the site corresponding to the village is thought to have existed and extended on both sides of the Coosawatee levee and the limited archaeological data for this portion of the site suggests at least three levels of occupation (based on brief surveys of house platforms southwest of the core mound).

Another feature of importance at the Bell Field site includes a large platform structure in its southeastern extent which showed some evidence of building structures atop it, due to the presence of numerous post-molds. Material culture of the platform itself was exclusively Lamar.

Storage pits full of burned corn and beans were also uncovered at the site. These appeared to be ritual in nature, based on the interment of the already-burned materials into the pits themselves as opposed to a burning of the site related to abandonment or removal.

A public dance-floor is thought to have been located at the southern edge of the site as well. This is based on the excavation of a large, compacted feature of pure sand that was uniform in both thickness and composition. A series of three earth lodges, consisting of a central building flanked by others, was also uncovered by the later excavations of the 1970s. These lodges were situated underneath the core mound and pre-date the rest of the site significantly. There was also evidence that these lodge structures were rebuilt over-time and reused before the construction of the core mound.

== Dating and cultural implications ==
Based on the data generated by the Kelley excavations, the chronology of the Bell Field site extends from a period of approximately 1000 AD to 1700 AD. The complete absence of historical artifacts or trade goods limits the site’s history to the early 1700s at the latest. Its earliest occupations are associated with the pre-Dallas earth lodges and are thought to correspond to a Savannah Period tradition based on the site’s geography and their construction. The main phases of occupation understood at the site are those associated with the core mound and village, which show a continued occupation from Dallas to Lamar, with the Lamar artifacts increasing in abundance in later portions of the site. These periods place the chronology of this portion of the Bell Field site firmly between the time of Hernando DeSoto’s explorations of the Southeast in the 1500s to the turn of the eighteenth century.

The occurrence of Dallas culture artifacts is thought to be linked with the Coosa Upper Creek, based on the location of the site, similar occurrences in other areas, and ethnographic evidence. Similarly, the Lamar tradition artifacts are thought to be related to the Cherokee people of the region at this time, based mainly on ethnographic evidence and geography of the site. The supposed dance-floor at the southern edge of the site also lends itself to a Cherokee period of occupation, based on the occurrence of stomp-dances in Cherokee culture which could have produced the flat, compact deposit noted by Kelley.

Another cultural activity present at Bell Field seems to have been ritual burning associated with cyclical cycles of rebuilding. This is most evident in the core mound stratigraphy as well as the proximate building complexes.

== See also ==
- Sixtoe Mound (9MU100)
- Little Egypt (9MU102)
- Dallas phase
- Mississippian culture
