= John Davis (offensive lineman) =

American football player (born 1965)

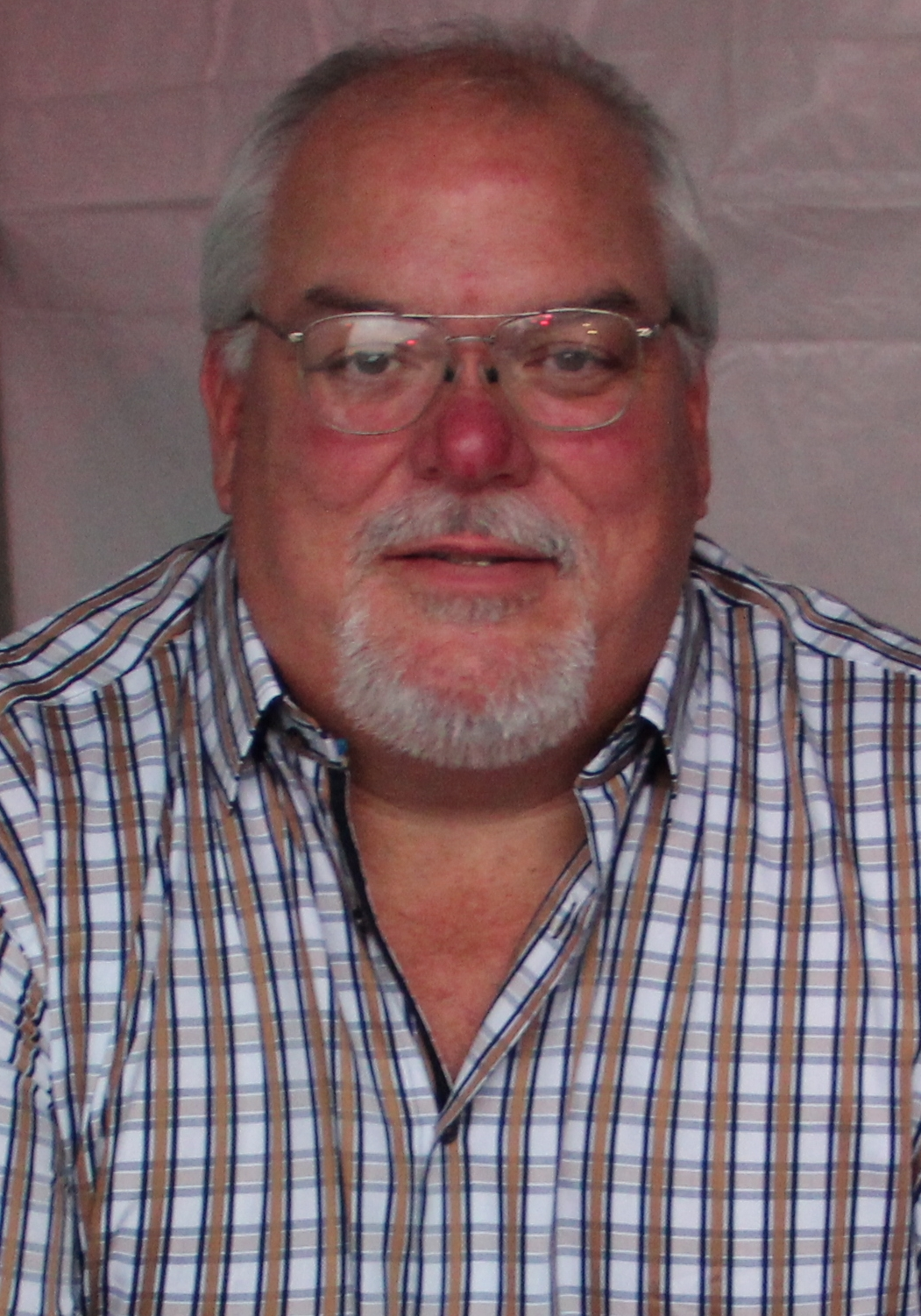
- Davis in 2014

No. 73, 79, 65
- Positions: Guard, tackle

Personal information
- Born: August 22, 1965 (age 61); Ellijay, Georgia, U.S.
- Listed height: 6 ft 4 in (1.93 m)
- Listed weight: 310 lb (141 kg)

Career information
- High school: Gilmer (Ellijay)
- College: Georgia Tech
- NFL draft: 1987: 11th round, 287th overall pick

Career history
- Houston Oilers (1987–1988); Buffalo Bills (1989–1994)

Awards and highlights
- 2× First-team All-American (1985, 1986); First-team All-ACC (1986)

Career NFL statistics
- Games played: 104
- Games started: 59
- Stats at Pro Football Reference

John Henry Davis (born August 22, 1965) is an American former professional football player who was an offensive lineman in the National Football League (NFL), primarily for the Buffalo Bills. He played college football for the Georgia Tech Yellow Jackets, twice earning first-team All-American honors. Davis played in Super Bowl XXV, Super Bowl XXVII, and Super Bowl XXVIII. He was also with the Bills for Super Bowl XXVI, but did not play in the game due to a knee injury.

== High school ==
Davis graduated from Gilmer High School in Gilmer County, Georgia in 1983. Davis was a four-year letterman in football and awarded Gilmer High School's best defensive player in 1981 and served as the team captain in 1982. In basketball, he received best defensive player his sophomore year, was the leading scorer, leading rebounder, and most valuable player his junior year. In 1982, he was selected as the Georgia High School Association AA Lineman of the Year, and First-team All-State selection in football and basketball.

== College ==
Davis attended the Georgia Institute of Technology, where he was a four-year starter on the Georgia Tech Yellow Jackets football team. In 1983, he was selected to the Freshman All-American Football Team. He was awarded the Sports Illustrated National Offensive Player of the Week for his play in a victory over Clemson and earned a tag as "The Refrigerator Mover" for his outstanding performance against All-American William "The Refrigerator" Perry.

In 1985, he was selected as a first-team All-American at lineman by The Sporting News and was awarded the Atlanta Athletic Club Southeastern Lineman of the Year. In his senior season in 1986, Davis was an All-ACC selection and Scripps-Howard first-team All-American. Following his final season at Georgia Tech, he was selected to play in the Blue–Gray Football Classic and Japan Bowl All-Star Games. Davis was inducted into the Georgia Tech Athletics Hall of Fame in 1991.

== Professional career ==
Pre-draft measurables
Height	Weight	Arm length	Hand span	40-yard dash	10-yard split	20-yard split	Vertical jump	Bench press
6 ft 3 7/8 in (1.93 m)	301 lb (137 kg)	31 1/4 in (0.79 m)	9 in (0.23 m)	5.53 s	1.95 s	3.20 s	21.0 in (0.53 m)	21 reps
All values from NFL Combine

Davis's professional football career began when he was selected 287th overall by the Houston Oilers in the 11th round of the 1987 NFL draft. He played for the Oilers from 1987 to 1989, and then went on to play for the Buffalo Bills from 1989 to 1994. Davis was a member of four Super Bowl teams with Buffalo before retiring in 1994. He started at right guard in Super Bowl XXV, missed Super Bowl XXVI due to a knee injury, played in Super Bowl XXVII, and started at left guard in Super Bowl XXVIII. He was awarded the NFL's Ed Block Courage Award in 1993 – this award is given "to honor one player from each NFL team who, in the eyes of his teammates, exemplified a commitment to sportsmanship and courage".

"I was on a team that did something that will never be done again, and that's playing in four-straight Super Bowls."

— John Davis

== Outside Football ==
Davis founded the John Davis Georgia Mountains Hospice Golf Classic which benefits North Georgia patients with hospice care.
