= Ledford =

Ledford may refer to:

== People ==
- Brandy Ledford (born 1969), American actress, model and Penthouse magazine's 1992 "Pet of the Year"
- Cawood Ledford (1926–2001), radio play-by-play announcer for the University of Kentucky
- Dwayne Ledford (born 1976), American football coach and former player
- Frank F. Ledford Jr. (1934–2019), American orthopedic surgeon
- Homer Ledford (1927–2006), instrument maker and bluegrass musician from Kentucky
- John Ledford (born 1969), American entrepreneur and producer
- Lily May Ledford (1917–1985), American clawhammer banjo and fiddle player
- Mark Ledford (1960–2004), American trumpeter, singer, and guitarist

== Places ==
- Ledford Island, a site of the Mouse Creek phase archaeological culture of the Eastern Tennessee
- Ledford, Illinois, an unincorporated community in the Harrisburg Township, Saline County

== Schools ==
- Ledford High School, a public high school in Thomasville, North Carolina
- Ledford Middle School, a public school in the Davidson County, North Carolina school district
