= Tails Creek, Georgia =

Unincorporated community in Georgia, U.S.

Coordinates: 34°41′23″N 84°36′56″W

Tails Creek is an unincorporated area in Gilmer County, in the U.S. state of Georgia.

== History ==
A post office called Tail's Creek was established in 1849, and remained in operation until 1940. The community took its name from the nearby stream Tails Creek. A variant spelling is "Tailscreek".
