= Turniptown Creek =

Stream in Georgia, U.S.

- Location in Georgia

Location
- Country: United States
- State: Georgia
- County: Gilmer

Physical characteristics
- Source
  - location: Tickanetley
  - coordinates: 34.74036°N 84.34575°E
- Mouth: Ellijay River
  - location: Northcutt
  - coordinates: 34.73036°N 84.44798°W
  - elevation: 1,293 feet (394 m)

Basin features
- River system: ACF River Basin
- Tributaries
  - right: Little Turniptown Creek

Turniptown Creek is a stream in the U.S. state of Georgia. It is a tributary to the Ellijay River.

Turniptown is an English translation of the native Cherokee language name.

== See also ==
- List of rivers of Georgia (U.S. state)
