= Georgia Apple Festival =

Annual festival in Ellijay, Georgia

- Genre: Food festival
- Locations: Ellijay Lions Club Fairgrounds, 1729 South Main Street, Ellijay, GA; Ellijay, Georgia, United States
- Coordinates: 34.6729°N 84.4957°W
- Years active: 1971–2019, 2021–
- Website: www.georgiaapplefestival.org

The Georgia Apple Festival is an annual festival in Ellijay, Georgia. The festival has been held every October since 1971 and offers handmade crafts, live music, and apples. An annual parade and antique car show are also held in conjunction with the festival.

== History ==
After the boll weevil came through and destroyed Georgia's cotton crops in the 1920s, Gilmer County's economy was bolstered by its apple orchards. A festival to celebrate the apples and what they did for the county during the hard times created by the loss of the cotton crop was first held in 1971.
