= Gilmer County Courthouse =

- Formerly listed on the U.S. National Register of Historic Places
- Old courthouse demolished in 2008

- Location within Georgia Location within the United States
- Location: Courthouse Sq., Ellijay, Georgia, United States
- Coordinates: 34°41′41.97″N 84°29′0.02″W
- Built: 1898
- Architectural style: Classical Revival
- Demolished: 2008
- MPS: Georgia County Courthouses TR
- NRHP reference No.: 80001081

Significant dates
- Added to NRHP: September 18, 1980
- Removed from NRHP: June 10, 2026

The Gilmer County Courthouse was the courthouse for Gilmer County, Georgia, United States, from 1934 until 2003. It was built in 1898 as the Hyatt Hotel (no relation to Hyatt Hotels), making it the only courthouse in the state not originally built as a courthouse. It was listed on the National Register of Historic Places in 1980, and was delisted in 2026.

In 2003, the fire marshal condemned the building due to building code and fire code violations, and the county judiciary was moved to other buildings in Ellijay on March 27. The county commission voted to destroy the historic building rather than renovate and restore it. A November 2006 referendum of county voters approved the municipal bond for a new facility, and allowed the destruction of the previous one.

It was identified as threatened in the 2005 catalog of the Northwest Georgia Threatened Historic Sites Project. Hopes for saving it were ended in early 2008, when it was demolished on January 7. A new government building will be constructed in its place.

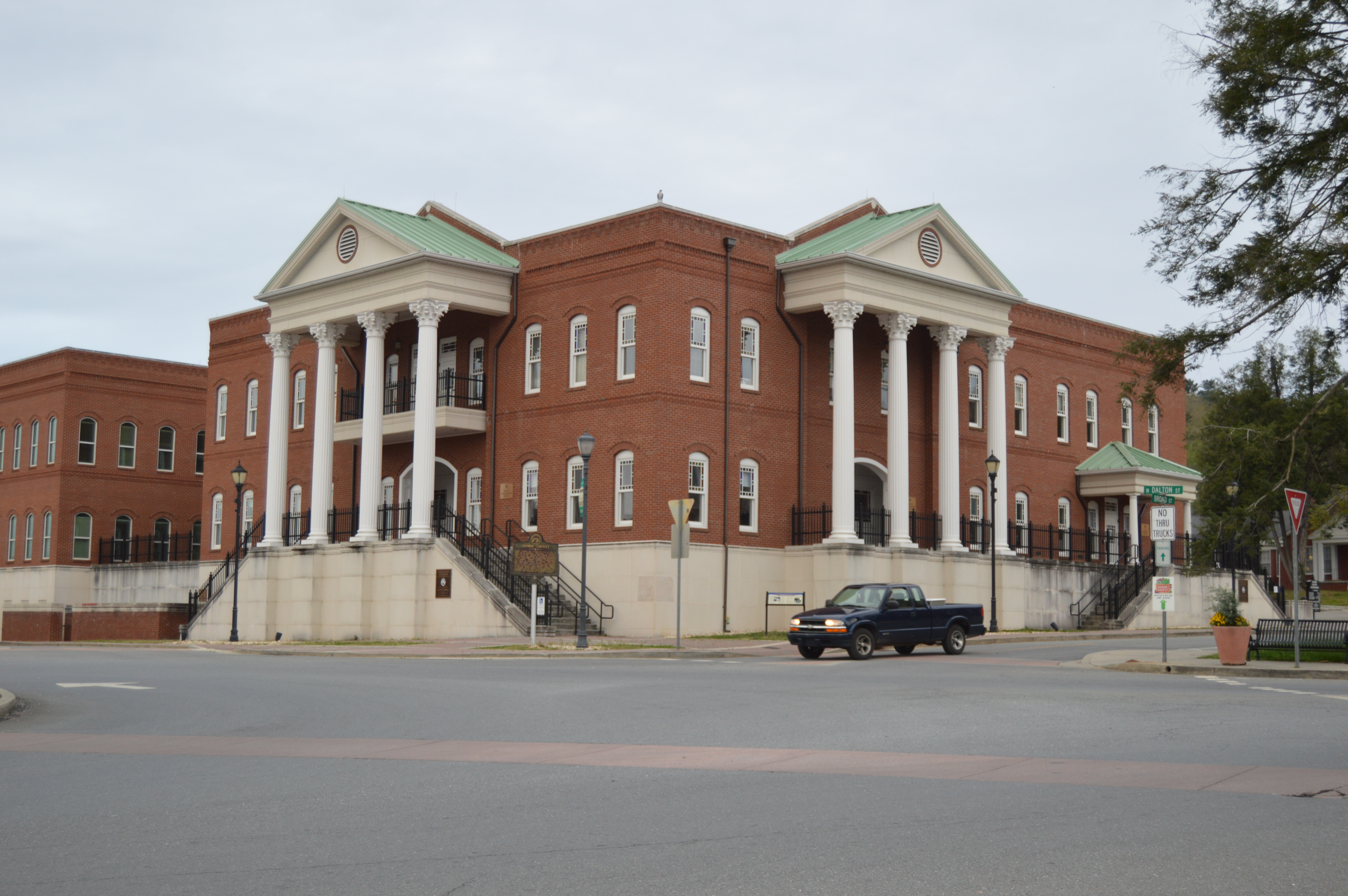
Replacement courthouse on the same site

== See also ==
- Northwest Georgia Threatened Historic Sites Project
