= Sixtoe Mound =

Archaeological site in Georgia, US

- Location within Georgia
- 34°36′44.53″N 84°40′29.78″W
- Cultures: South Appalachian Mississippian culture
- Location: Murray County, Georgia, USA
- Region: Murray County, Georgia

Site notes
- Architectural style: platform mound
- Excavation dates: 1962-1965
- Archaeologists: Arthur Randolph Kelly

The Sixtoe Mound site (9MU100) is an archaeological site in Murray County, Georgia excavated by Arthur Randolph Kelly from 1962-1965 as a part of the Carters Dam project conducted for the National Park Service by the University of Georgia. The site consisted of a low platform mound and an associated village. The majority of the mound was excavated, while the village received little excavation.

== Sixtoe Field ==
Excavation in Sixtoe Field began in 1962. Excavation covered about 25 acres (10 ha), with test pits yielding the existence of a workshop site (9MU100; XU-G). A ton or more of worked stone of various stages was discovered here, with some stones being subjected to heating or burning. The majority of the mineral content was quartz, with about 5 per cent showing various quartzitic combinations: slate, limestone, limited flint or chert. A few "rejects" were found, but almost no completed or nearly completed specimens. The artifacts indicate that main period of workshop activity took place during the Late Archaic period. The site is not a source site of quartz; rather the quartz came from the streambed of the Coosawattee River.

A village site was also discovered, as testing with a light steel probe uncovered a "hardpan", a tough compacted span of soil that is indicative of a floor of a housing structure. Excavation focused on two housing structures, Structure #1 and Structure #2. Structure #1 was most likely a house that was 20 feet (6.1 m) by 20 feet (6.1 m) with rounded corners. There was an entrance on the south side with a central hearth in the middle of the structure. No wall daub was found; rather the walls were most likely made with saplings with upper tapering portions bent and tied in the roof section, with cane mat- ting tied to a supporting framework of small splints inter- woven in the wall fabric. Structure #2 was very similar to Structure #1, but with some variations in post mould patterns. These structures also shared the relative same presence of artifacts and midden on the floor surface. The majority of the sherds found in Structure #1 and Structure #2 were of those were Dallas Plain.

The "trash pits" of the village were able to illustrate what these people were eating. A main component of these middens were animal bones, particularly deer bones. Other small mammal bones along with fish bones and turtle carapaces were found as well. Apart from animal remains, numerous deposits of charred acorns and hickory nuts were found in pockets. What is noted here is that these people lived nearly on a completely traditional diet, with a notable absence of charred corncobs and kernels, which are found in other sites dating to this time period.

== Sixtoe Mound ==
The majority of the excavation was conducted on the Sixtoe Mound. Sixtoe Mound was apparently a low, extensive platform mound of solid clay or gumbo construction, perhaps originally about 7 feet (2.1 m) above the surrounding terrain and original river levee. This is especially important in that when the Coosawattee River would flood, the mound would become an island until the water receded.

The Sixtoe Mound contained various zones of construction. Zone A was a sub-mound soil complex of dark clay with much silt, where the original land surface was uneven and a natural levee on the north bank of the Coosawattee. Zone B was the initial mound-fill that was composed of a dark, almost black clay, with heavy organic content, charcoal, and some scattered midden inclusions. This zone varied in thickness from 20 inches (51 cm)-30 inches (76 cm) and formed the core mound of the structure. Zone C was a small lamination of water-laid yellow-brown sand, ranging from 2 inches (5.1 cm)-6 inches (15 cm) thick. Zone D consisted of basket-loaded clay, while Zone E was the complex superficies of Sixtoe Mound.

The features of initial interest in this mound were the stone boulders, which varied from 2-75 pounds. These boulders formed a continuous mantle along the east escarpment of the mound. This wall was 12 inches (30 cm)-14 inches (36 cm) wide and most likely served as a major factor in stabilizing erosion down slope.

The Sixtoe Mound was located over 1,200 feet (370 m) from the village site and most likely served as a ceremonial center, which had large dormitory-like structures, two of which were 40 feet (12 m) by 70 feet (21 m), on the mound summit. These structures were not burned down, but were rather built over, or one building would fall apart and a new one was then built over the remains.

Unlike the village, midden accumulation in these structures was relatively scarce. Midden was most likely thrown into quarry pits made during construction of the mound and contained little animal bones, ash, or charcoal, which also differed from the village site. Pottery sherds were also found and ¾ of the pottery was limestone tempered plain and complicated stamped, and this lack of shell tempered or sand tempered pottery as found in other sites in the area is somewhat of an anomaly. A number of non-ceramic artifacts were found, which include shell hoes, bone awls, a rough chipped stone spade, projectile points, flint knives, and a pair of ground stone "napkin ring" ear spools.

== See also ==
- Bell Field Mound Site (9MU101)
- Little Egypt (9MU102)
- List of Mississippian sites
