= Gilmer County School District =

School district in Georgia (U.S. state)

Address
- 408 Bobcat Trail Ellijay, Georgia, 30540-5406; United States
- Coordinates: 34.298884°N 83.837185°W

District information
- Grades: Pre-school - 12
- Superintendent: Dr. Brian Ridley
- Accreditation(s): Southern Association of Colleges and Schools; Georgia Accrediting Commission

Students and staff
- Enrollment: 4,300
- Faculty: 247

Other information
- Telephone: (706) 276-5000
- Fax: (706) 276-5005
- Website: www.gilmerschools.com

The Gilmer County School District is a public school district in Gilmer County, Georgia, United States, based in Ellijay. It serves the communities of East Ellijay and Ellijay.

== Schools ==
The Gilmer County School District has three elementary schools, one middle school, and one high school.

=== Elementary schools ===
- Ellijay Elementary School
- Clear Creek Elementary School
- Mountain View Elementary School

=== Middle schools ===
- Clear Creek Middle School

=== High school ===
- Gilmer High School
