= Cartecay Methodist Church and Cemetery =

Historic site in Gilmer County, Georgia, US

- U.S. National Register of Historic Places
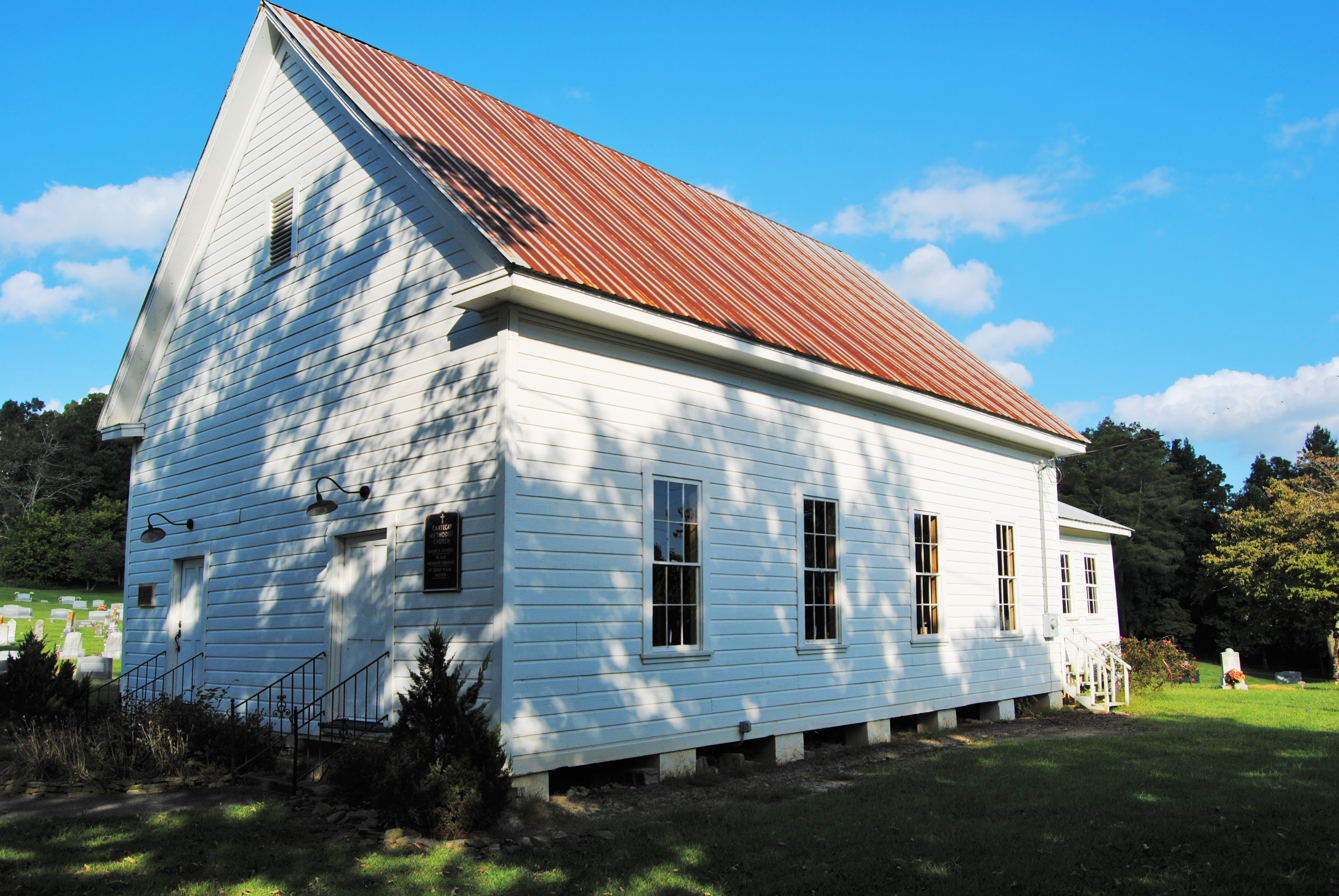

- Location within Georgia Location within the United States
- Location: Junction of State Route 52 and Roy Rd., near Ellijay, Georgia
- Coordinates: 34°38′39″N 84°23′24″W
- Area: 2.5 acres (1.0 ha)
- Built: c. 1859
- NRHP reference No.: 01000383
- Added to NRHP: April 19, 2001

The Cartecay Methodist Church and Cemetery, in Gilmer County, Georgia, near Ellijay, Georgia was listed on the National Register of Historic Places in 2001.

The Cartecay Methodist Church was organized in 1834. The listed church building was built upon two acres of land that were donated by Barnett Wilson in 1859. The church, built c. 1859, is a frame structure with mortise-and-tenon construction, made of hand-hewn virgin pine. About 60 years later, a local craftsman and congregation member named Frank B. Haigler added an unusual faux bois finish to all interior surfaces other than the floor. The building was expanded by two Sunday school rooms added after World War II.

The cemetery is "laid out in a fairly regular gridiron pattern with a variety of modest stone grave markers and minimal landscaping."

The modern Cartecay United Methodist Church, whose address is 7629 Highway 52 East, in Ellijay, has a new building behind the historic one. (Note: The new and old buildings can be seen in photos, e.g., at Facebook page of the church.)
