= Mountaintown Creek =

Stream in Gilmer County, Georgia, U.S

Coordinates: 34.6648076°N 84.5649307°W

Mountaintown Creek is a stream in Gilmer County, Georgia, United States, that is a tributary of the Coosawattee River.

The creek was named after "Mountain Town", a local Native American settlement.

== See also ==
- List of rivers in Georgia (U.S. state)
