= Tickanetley Creek =

Stream in Georgia, USA

Coordinates: 34.63509°N 84.29909°W

Tickanetley Creek is a stream in the U.S. state of Georgia. It is a tributary to the Cartecay River.

Tickanetley Creek takes its name from the former Cherokee village of Tickanetley, Georgia. Variant names are "Ticanetlee Creek", "Tickanetly Creek", and "Tickenetly Creek".
