= Tails Creek =

Stream which is a tributary of Coosawattee river in Georgia, US

Coordinates: 34°38′46.31″N 84°36′18.76″W

Tails Creek is a stream in the U.S. state of Georgia. It is a tributary to the Coosawattee River.

The stream was named for the "Tail" Indians which settled near its course. A variant name is "Tail Creek".
