= Ai, Georgia =

- Unincorporated community
- Location within Georgia Location within the United States
- Coordinates: 34°50′1″N 84°27′10″W
- Country: United States
- State: Georgia
- County: Gilmer
- Elevation: 2,228 ft (679 m)
- Time zone: UTC-5 (Eastern (EST))
  - Summer (DST): UTC-4 (EDT)
- GNIS ID: 331003

Ai is an unincorporated community in Gilmer County, Georgia, United States.

A post office called Ai was established in 1920, and remained in operation until 1932. The community was named after Ai, a place mentioned in the Hebrew Bible. Ai was located inland away from the railroad.
