= Gilmer High School =

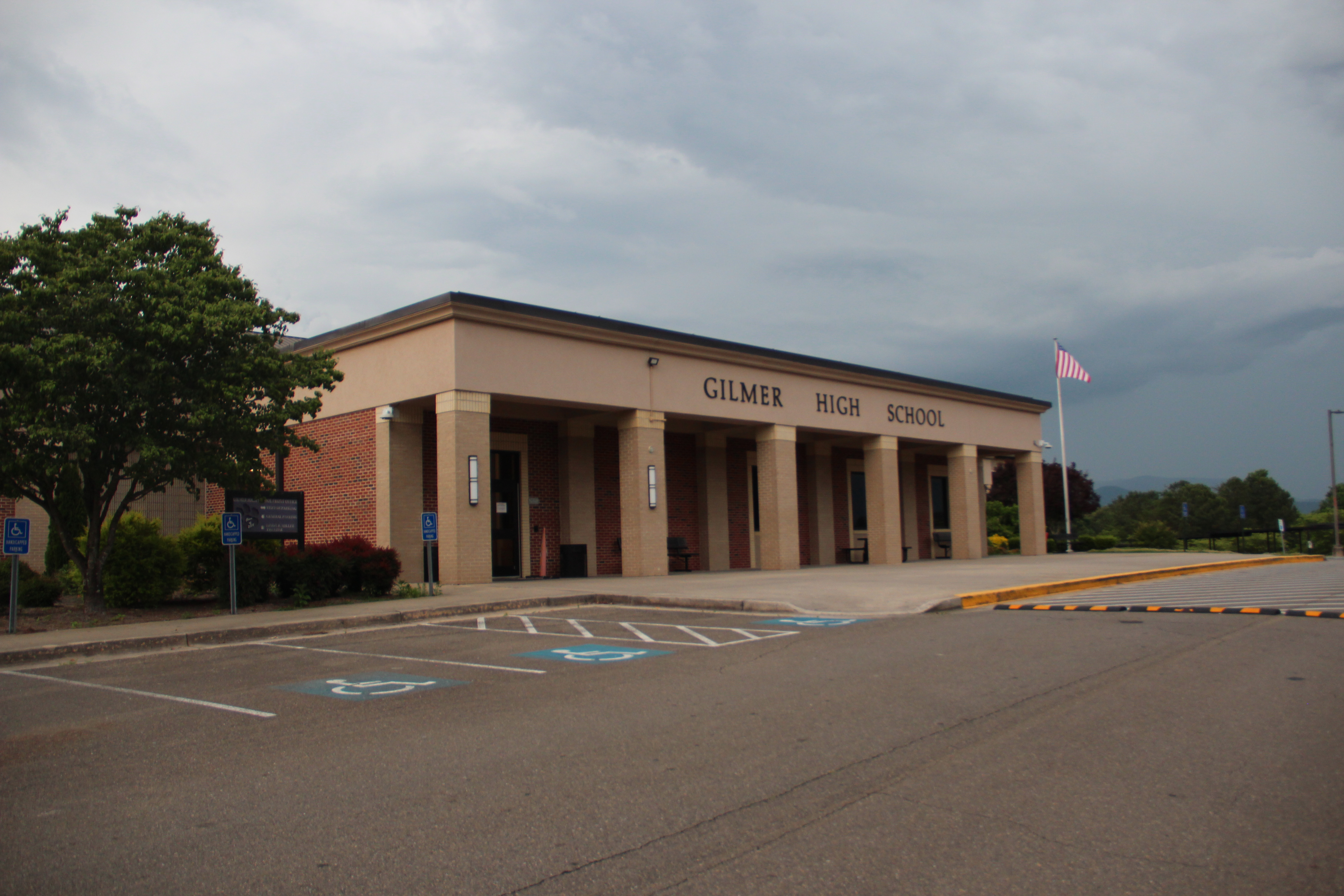

Location
- 408 Bobcat Trail; Ellijay, Georgia 30540; U.S.
- Coordinates: 34.6788°N 84.5009°W

Information
- Type: Public high school
- Established: 1956
- Principal: Tiffany Boyette
- Staff: 73.70 (FTE)
- Grades: 9–12
- Enrollment: 1,238 (2023-2024)
- Student to teacher ratio: 16.80
- Colors: Purple and white
- Athletics conference: GHSA 7AAA
- Mascot: Bobcat
- Newspaper: The Purple and White
- Schedule: 4*4 block schedule
- Website: ghs.gilmerschools.com

Gilmer High School is located in North Georgia in the city of Ellijay, Georgia, United States. It serves Gilmer County. It was established in August 1956 and enrolls about 1182 students in grades 9–12. It is a public high school of the State of Georgia and is accredited by the Southern Association of Colleges and Schools and the Georgia High School Association.

== Administration ==
- Tiffany Boyette, principal
- Angelia Samples, assistant principal
- Matthew Johnson, assistant principal
- Erin Low, assistant principal

== Demographics ==
In 2010, Gilmer High School had 90.4% white, 9.3% Hispanic, and 0.2% African American and Asian students.

== Academics ==
Gilmer High School offers Honors and Advanced Placement courses as well as traditional classes. Gilmer provides a special education program for students with disabilities. It has a ratio of one teacher to every 14 students.

== Athletics ==
Gilmer High School offers 14 sports, competing in Georgia High School Association Region 7 AAA. Football and wrestling are the two male-only sports, while cheerleading and volleyball are the two female-only sports. Basketball, soccer, track and field, cross country running, tennis, golf, and baseball/softball have separate men's and women's leagues. The school's wrestling team has won 19 GHSA State Championships.

== Arts and clubs ==
The school competes in regional and state level competitions. The academics-based clubs are Beta, Math Honor Society, Applied Physics: Rube Goldberg Machine, and the Academic Team. Gilmer has five clubs for the arts, including marching and concert band, chorus, Art Club, and drama. Gilmer High also offers chess club, Robotics club, Gilmer Anime and Manga Enthusiasts, Future Business Leaders of America, Fellowship of Christian Athletes, Family Career and Community Leaders of America, Future Educators Association, journalism, Skills USA, Yearbook, Interact, Ultimate Frisbee, and Future Farmers of America.

The school's academic team has competed in the High Q Bowl and in the National Academic Competition in July 2010.

== Graduation statistics ==
The Gilmer High School graduating class usually consists of about 220 students. About 66% of graduates go on to further their education at a college or university. Nearly 11% of graduating students attend a technical or vocational school, and 10% go into the U.S. military. The remaining 13% enter the work force intermediately after graduation. The graduation ceremony takes place in early June on the GHS football field

== Anthrax scare ==
Gilmer High School received a threatening letter that mentioned anthrax and contained a white powdery substance on the morning of March 3, 2010. The letter was opened by a food service employee before classes began. The school building was immediately evacuated except for individuals who could have been contaminated by the unknown substance. Students were held in the gym until their parents could pick them up. Students who drove onto campus were dismissed to leave. Gilmer County police informed the Federal Bureau of Investigation, Georgia Bureau of Investigation, and the United States Postal Inspector. The Cherokee County HAZMAT crew was sent to Gilmer High School to handle the substance. Investigators later determined the substance was a nontoxic powder.

== Notable alumni ==
- John Davis, former NFL player
