= Yukon, Georgia =

Unincorporated community in Georgia, U.S.

Coordinates: 34°37′38″N 84°28′05″W

Yukon is an unincorporated community in Gilmer County, in the U.S. state of Georgia.

== History ==
A post office called Yukon was established in 1899, and remained in operation until 1916. The community was named after the contemporaneous gold rush in the Canadian territory of Yukon.
