= Cartecay River =

River in Georgia, United States

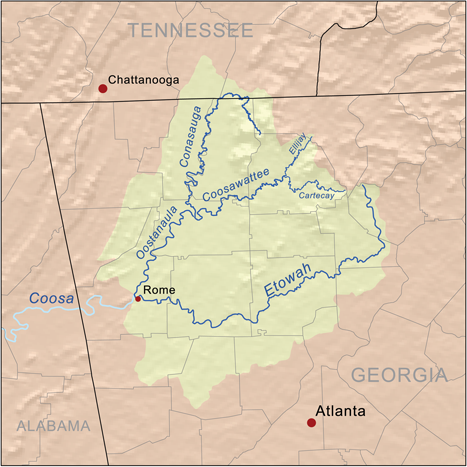

Physical characteristics
- Source: Roston Creek
  - location: White Path, Georgia
  - coordinates: 34.729°N 84.347°W
  - elevation: 3,079 ft (938 m)
- Mouth: Coosawattee River
  - location: Ellijay, Georgia
  - coordinates: 34.6914744°N 84.4835388°W
  - elevation: 575 ft (175 m)
- Length: 19.1 mi (30.7 km)
- Basin size: 135 mi^{2} (350 km^{2})

The Cartecay River is a 19.1-mile-long (30.7 km) river that runs into Ellijay, Georgia, in Gilmer County. It is the site of a class II whitewater run.

The Cartecay and Ellijay rivers meet in Ellijay to form the Coosawattee River. The Cartecay and most of its watershed are located within the southeast corner of Gilmer County, Georgia, but there are small sections of the watershed in Fannin, Pickens, and Dawson counties.

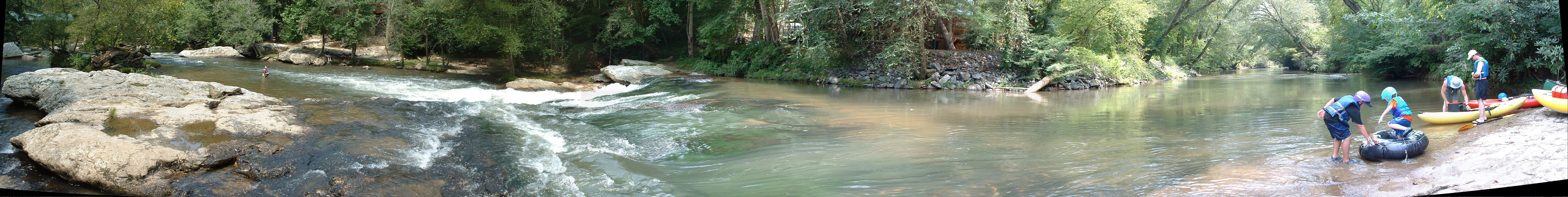
Blackberry Falls rapid on the Cartecay River near Ellijay

Much of the river runs east to west and is bordered by Georgia State Route 52. The Cartecay River basin covers 86,734 acres (351.0 km^{2}) in total area. The major tributaries are Clear Creek, Licklog Creek, Owltown Creek, Anderson Creek and Tickanetley Creek. The land is mostly undeveloped, but the river passes through some residential developments. The headwaters of the Cartecay River begin in the Chattahoochee National Forest.
