= Crane Eater Creek =

Stream in Gordon County, Georgia, U.S.

Coordinates: 34°31′59″N 84°53′20″W

Crane Eater Creek is a stream in Gordon County, Georgia, United States, that is a tributary of the Coosawattee River.

Crane Eater Creek has the name of a Cherokee man who settled near its course.

== See also ==
- List of rivers in Georgia (U.S. state)
