= Shallowford Bridge =

- Coordinates: 34.78406°N 84.25948°W
- Crosses: Toccoa River
- Locale: Blue Ridge, Georgia

Characteristics
- Material: Steel
- Total length: 53.3 meters (175 feet)
- Width: 3.4 meters (11 feet)
- Longest span: 38 meters (125 feet)
- Clearance above: 3 meters (9.8 feet)

History
- Opened: 1918

Shallowford Bridge is a steel truss bridge built in 1918 that crosses the Toccoa River in north Georgia, United States. The bridge, located on Aska Road close to the city of Blue Ridge, is 175 feet in length, and 11 feet wide. The bridge is constructed from a steel truss frame with wooden deck to allow traffic to cross. The bridge forms part of the Benton MacKaye Trail.
