= Ellijay River =

Location
- Country: United States

Physical characteristics
- Source: Cherry Log Creek
  - location: Blue Ridge, Georgia
  - coordinates: 34°47′10″N 84°24′12″W
  - elevation: 1,699 ft (518 m)
- Mouth: Coosawattee River
  - location: Ellijay, Georgia
  - coordinates: 34°41′29″N 84°29′01″W
  - elevation: 575 ft (175 m)
- Length: 15.1 mi (24.3 km)
- Basin size: 92 mi^{2} (240 km^{2})

The Ellijay River is a 15.1-mile-long (24.3 km) river in Georgia. It ends in the town of Ellijay at its confluence with the Cartecay River, forming the Coosawattee River in Gilmer County.

== See also ==
- List of rivers of Georgia
- Turniptown Creek, left-bank tributary
