= Carters Dam =

Coordinates: 34.6154°N 84.6739°W

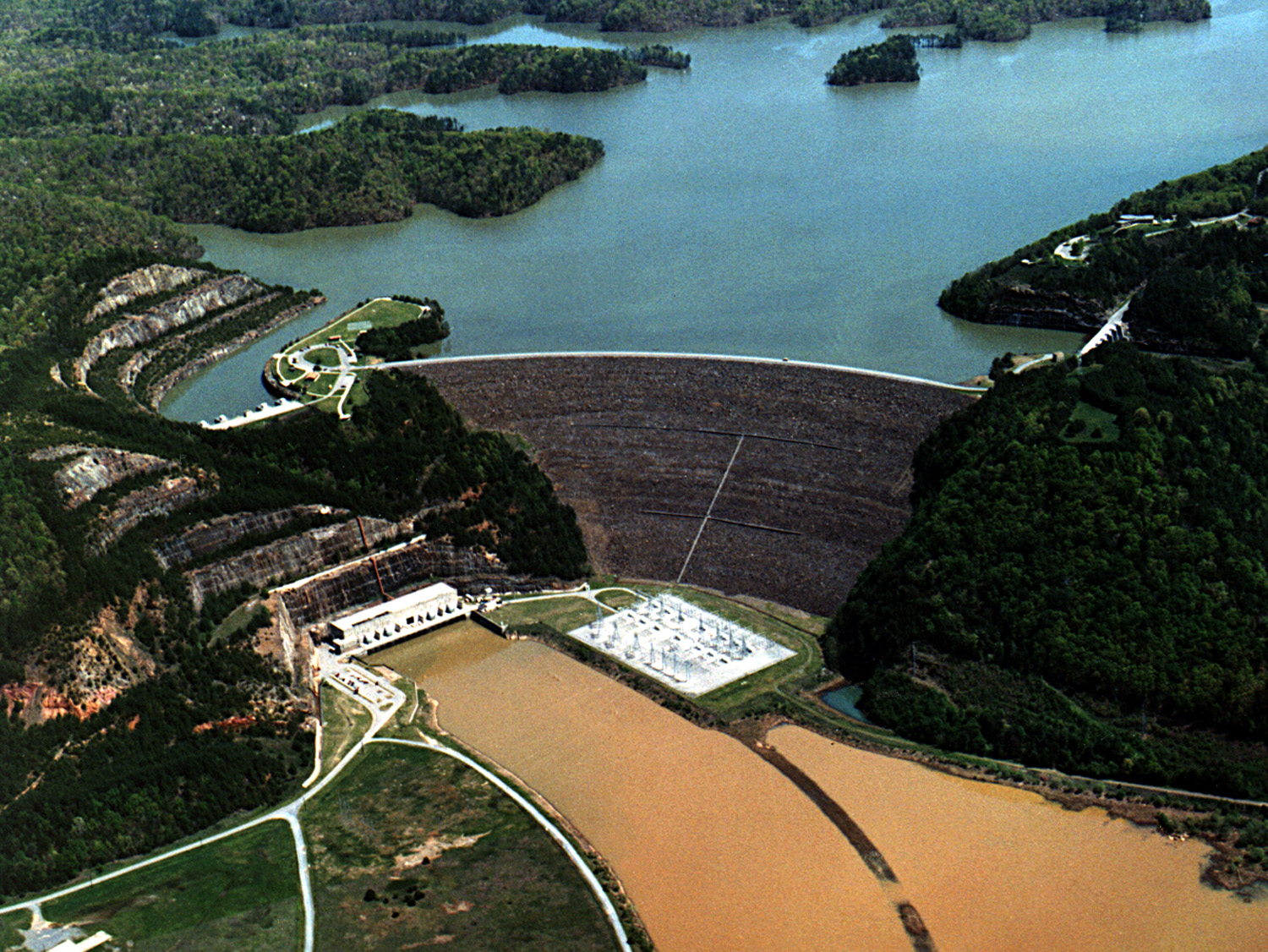
- Interactive map of Carters Dam
- Country: United States
- Location: Murray County, Georgia
- Status: Operational
- Opening date: 1977
- Built by: United States Army Corps of Engineers
- Designed by: United States Army Corps of Engineers

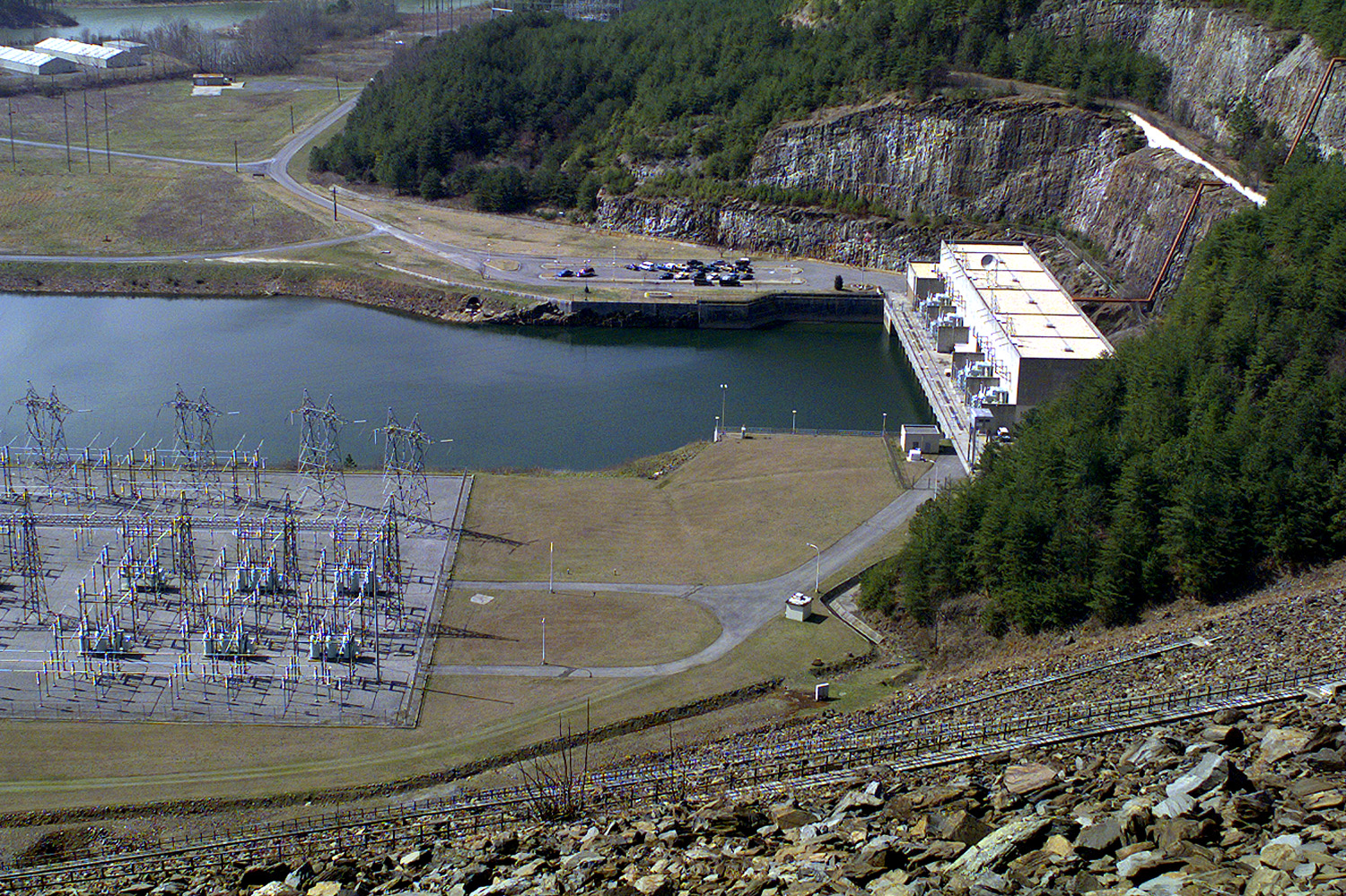
The powerhouse and switchyard at Carters Dam

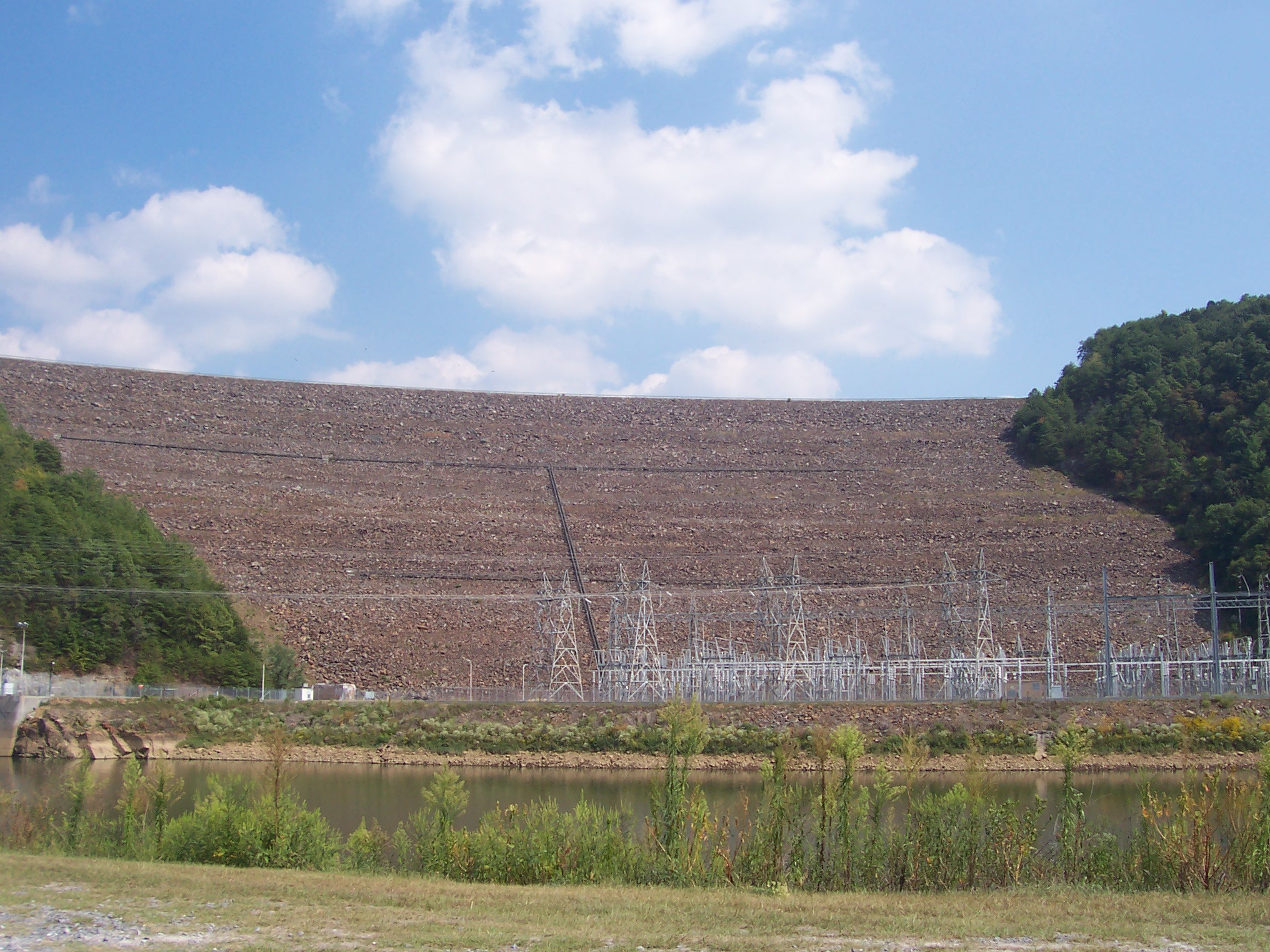
Carters Dam

Carters Dam is an earthen embankment dam located south of Chatsworth in Murray County and west of Ellijay in northwestern Georgia, United States, that creates Carters Lake.

== Description ==
The dam is 445 feet (136 m) tall and is situated 26.8 miles (43.1 km) above the mouth of the Coosawattee River. The drainage area is 376 square miles (970 km^{2}).

The dam took 15 years to build and was completed in 1977 (49 years ago). The area of the primary flood control pool is 3,880 acres (1,570 ha). The top elevation of the dam is 1,112.3 feet (339.0 m). The top width of the dam is 40 feet (12 m). The dam is constructed of rock and earth and is the tallest earthen dam east of the Mississippi River.

The dam has a diversion tunnel that is 2,407 feet (734 m). It is a horseshoe shape with a bottom width of 23 feet (7.0 m).

The lake is the deepest manmade reservoir east of the Mississippi River and deepest lake in Georgia. The created lake is more than 450 feet (140 m) deep and has 62 miles (100 km) of shoreline without any private docks or other development.

== Hydroelectric plant ==
Below the dam is a 1,000-acre (400 ha) retention and re-regulation lake (Reregulation Reservoir). The hydroelectric plant is of the pumped storage type. That is, during off-peak hours the water from the retention lake is pumped back up to Carters Lake for use in generating power during the next time of peak demand. The dam's power station contains 2 × 140 megawatts (190,000 hp) Francis turbines and 2 × 160 MW Modified Francis pump turbines for used in pumped-storage (500 MW).

Electricity from the dam is marketed by the Southeastern Power Administration.

== See also ==
- List of dams and reservoirs in Georgia (U.S. state)
- List of power plants in Georgia
- Sixtoe Mound
- Pumped-storage hydroelectricity
- List of energy storage projects
- List of pumped-storage hydroelectric power stations
- United States Department of Energy Global Energy Storage Database
