= White Path, Georgia =

Unincorporated community in Georgia, U.S.

Coordinates: 34°45′01″N 84°24′47″W

White Path is an unincorporated community in Gilmer County, in the U.S. state of Georgia.

== History ==
A post office called White Path was established in 1847, and remained in operation until 1940. The community was named after White Path, a Cherokee chieftain. Variant names are "Whitepath", "Nun-na-tsu-nega", and "Nunne-una-ga".
