= Mouse Creek phase =

Archaeological culture of the Eastern Tennessee region of Mississippian chiefdoms

The Mouse Creek phase is an archaeological culture of the Eastern Tennessee region of Mississippian chiefdoms, first defined by T. M. N. Lewis and Madeline Kneberg in their examinations of the Chickamauga Basin. This area exhibits artifacts, burials, and architecture distinct from other settlements in the area. The region was occupied from around 1400–1600.

Excavated settlements for this phase were found in Eastern Tennessee, in the region of the Hiwassee River and Mouse Creek.

== Funerary practices and skeletal remains ==
The main difference in Mouse Creek phase burials is the positioning of bodies and the lack of funeral mounds.

Burial sites were found to be distinguished by age and household. There were a few exceptions, but the majority of older children and adults were buried in their household cemetery. Children under the age of four were buried within structures. Evidence points to cemeteries being located in the front of winter structures.

The Ledford Island site features an exception to typical burials, as a cemetery was found in the plaza containing 86 individuals. 20 of the identifiable remains were adult males, 10 were subadults, and 9 were adult females.

This site also contained the largest number of funerary objects, mostly for males. In contrast, private, residential burials did not discriminate in funerary objects buried with males or females.

Mouse Creek phase sites differ in burial positioning from south Appalachian burials. 64% of the remains were found in an extended position, with 11% buried in a flexed position.

== Architecture ==
Structures across all three sites were fairly similar, with a few exceptions. The arrangement of each household’s buildings consisted of a summer building, a winter building, and a cemetery. Public buildings were larger and closer in construction to winter lodging. One structure indicated the presence of partitions, with at least nine divisions.

Summer buildings were made of more insubstantial construction. They were typically rectangular in shape and averaging about 3.7-4.9 m wide and 6.1-18.3 m long. Framework was wooden and set upon wooden posts driven into the ground. Roofing could be made with wooden shingles or a combination of saplings, river cane, and wooden splints. There were usually one or two entrances and walls were made of wooden boarding.

Winter buildings were much more substantial. They varied in shape between rectangular and circular, with measurements. They were sunken into the ground, with insulated walls of wattle and daub. Buildings only contained one, small entrance.

== Ceramics ==
Mouse Creek ceramics are characterized by plain, shell-tempered pottery, with incised decoration and filleted rims.

== Sites ==
=== Rymer site ===
The Rymer site covered an area of about 1.94 ha with an excavated area of 0.4 ha. It is located on the south side of the Hiwassee river, east of Interstate 75. 34 structures and 168 burials were discovered.

Evidence points to buildings lined along the riverbank in rows, except for a circular plan on a low knoll on the north end of the site.

=== Mouse Creek site ===
The Mouse Creek site was divided into north and south excavations. It is located on the north side of the Hiwassee river, just west of Interstate 75.

The northern excavation uncovered an area of about 0.24 ha and found 9 structures and 85 burials. Evidence of a palisade ran from the northwest to the southwest, but it is clear that it only existed for a portion of the time that the site was in use.

The southern excavation uncovered an area of about 0.4 ha and found 15 structures and 81 burials. A mound was found in the southern section, dating to the Late Woodland/Early Mississippian era. Evidence of palisades running from the southwest to the north-central area was found in this portion of the site.

=== Ledford Island site ===
The Ledford Island site is located on the eastern side of Ledford Island, at the fork in the Hiwassee River. The site holds an area of about 4-6 ha, with 0.7 ha excavated. 20 structures and 468 burials were found.

In contrast to the other sites, the Ledford Island site features a central plaza, with an unusually large public building on the north side and burials on the northeastern and southwestern sides of the plaza.
