= Coosawattee River =

River in Georgia, United States

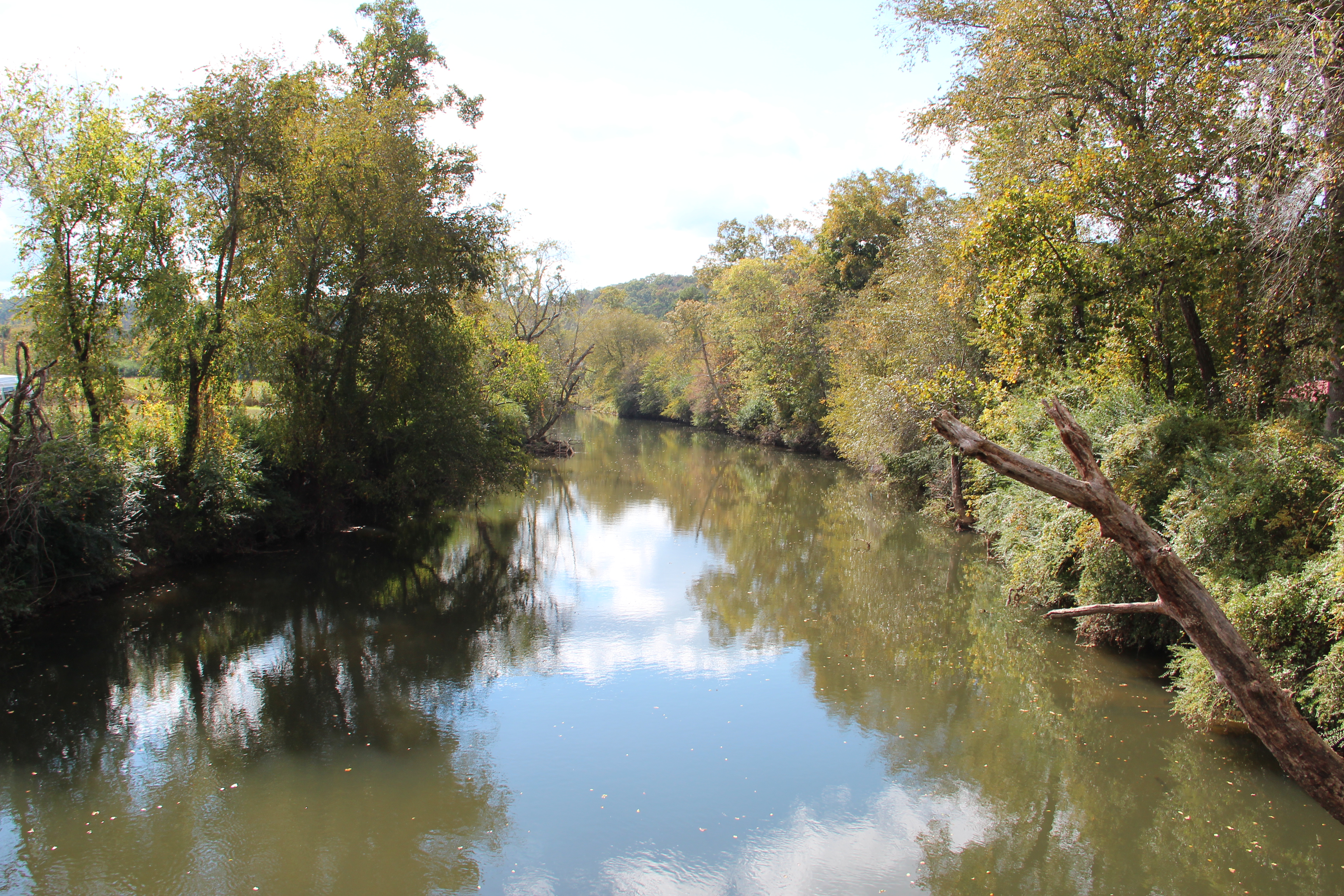
- The Coosawattee River in Ellijay, Georgia, October 2013

Location
- Country: United States
- State: Georgia
- County: Gilmer, Gordon, & Murray

Physical characteristics
- Source: Cartecay River
  - location: White Path, Georgia
  - coordinates: 34.729°N 84.347°W
  - elevation: 3,079 ft (938 m)
- 2nd source: Ellijay River
  - location: Blue Ridge, Georgia
  - coordinates: 34.860°N 84.331°W
  - elevation: 1,699 ft (518 m)
- Mouth: Oostanaula River
  - location: at Carters Lake
  - coordinates: 34.6050863°N 84.6332661°W
  - elevation: 1,073 ft (327 m)
- Length: 49.3 mi (79.3 km)
- Basin size: 860 sq mi (2,200 km^{2})

Basin features
- Tributaries
  - left: Coley Creek, Harris Creek, Camp Branch, Lewis Branch, Camp Branch, Talking Rock Creek, Duke Creek, Dry Creek, Salacoa Creek, and Crane Eater Creek
  - right: Mountaintown Creek, Tails Creek, Goble Branch, Woodring Branch, Fisher Creek, Willbanks Branch, Mineral Springs Branch, Rock Springs Branch, Sugar Branch, Noblet Creek, Dry Creek, and Vanns Creek

The Coosawattee River is a 49.3-mile-long (79.3 km) river located in northwestern Georgia, United States.

== Description ==
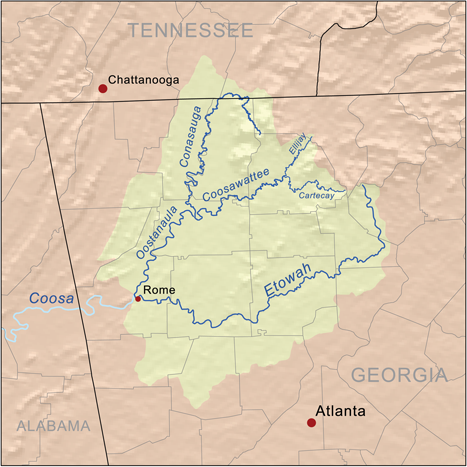
Map of the Coosa River headwaters, showing the Coosawattee River

The river is noted as beginning at the confluence of the Ellijay and Cartecay rivers in the city of Ellijay in central Gilmer County. The river flows west through the foothills in the North Georgia mountains region and is a tributary of the Oostanaula River (It in turn is a tributary of the Coosa River). Primary tributaries of the Cooswattee River include Mountaintown Creek, Tails Creek, Cole Creek, Goble Branch, Harris Creek, Camp Branch, Lewis Branch, Woodring Branch, Fisher Creek, Talking Rock Creek, Willbanks Branch, Mineral Springs Branch, Rock Springs Branch, Sugar Branch, Duke Creek, Noblet Creek, Dry Creek, Salacoa Creek, Vanns Creek, and Crane Eater Creek

In Murray County, the river is impounded by Carters Dam, forming Carters Lake behind the dam. (The lake is located mostly in Gilmer County). Completed in 1977, Carters Dam is the tallest earthen dam east of the Mississippi River. The Coosawattee River leaves the dam flowing west (directly into the Reregulation Reservoir). It serves as the Murray-Gordon County line before entering Gordon County.

Near New Echota, a late capital of the Cherokee Nation (1794-1907) before removal in 1838, the Coosawattee meets the Conasauga River. They form the Oostanaula River, a tributary of the Coosa River.

This area was the center of Cherokee Nation territory in north Georgia and southeastern Tennessee. In the early 1820s, after having migrated from eastern Tennessee after being forced by the United States to cede their lands there, they made New Echota their capital.

The Coosawattee Foundation was established in 1987 to protect and preserve Native American resources, primarily in the American Southeast. In addition to conducting excavations, it has initiated a variety of educational programs and lobbied for policy and programs to support this mission. It is based in Calhoun, Georgia.

== In popular culture ==
- American writer James Dickey used the Coosawattee River as the basis of his fictional "Cahulawassee River" in his debut novel, Deliverance (1970). It was adapted as a 1972 feature film of the same name, directed by John Boorman.

== See also ==
- List of rivers in Georgia (U.S. state)
