= Ellijay, Georgia =

- City
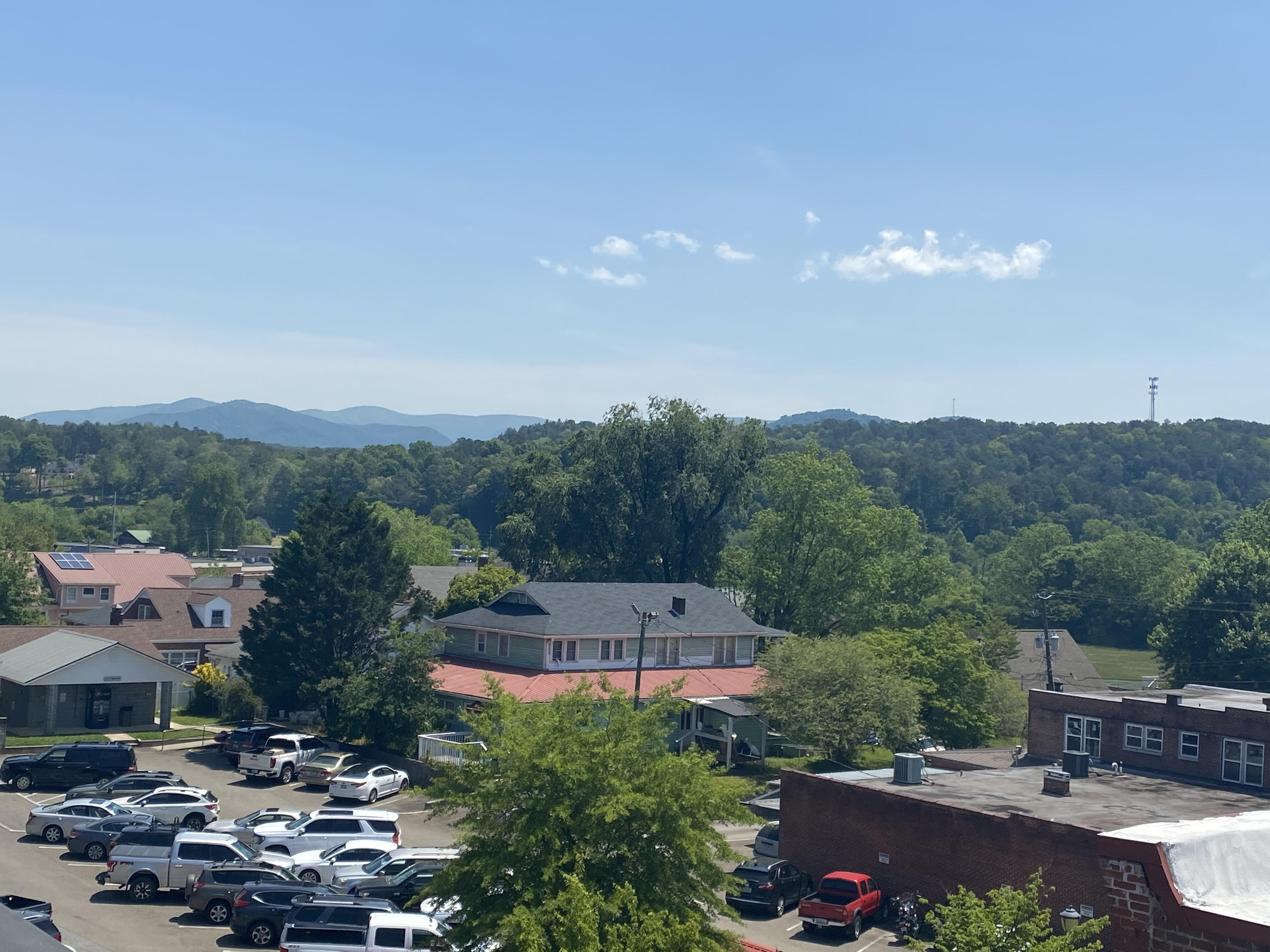
- Downtown Ellijay looking toward Walnut Mt.

- Seal Logo

- Location in Gilmer County and the state of Georgia
- Coordinates: 34°41′41″N 84°29′1″W
- Country: United States
- State: Georgia
- County: Gilmer

Area
  - Total: 3.54 sq mi (9.18 km^{2})
  - Land: 3.54 sq mi (9.18 km^{2})
  - Water: 0 sq mi (0.00 km^{2})
- Elevation: 1,280 ft (390 m)

Population (2020)
  - Total: 1,862
  - Density: 525.3/sq mi (202.83/km^{2})
- Time zone: UTC-5 (Eastern (EST))
  - Summer (DST): UTC-4 (EDT)
- ZIP code: 30540
- Area codes: 706/762
- FIPS code: 13-27092
- GNIS feature ID: 0331651
- Website: ellijay-ga.gov

Ellijay, occasionally spelled Elijay, is a city in Gilmer County, Georgia, United States. Its population was 1,862 at the 2020 census. The city is the county seat of Gilmer County.

Agriculture is important in Gilmer County, known as the "Apple Capital of Georgia." The city holds an annual Georgia Apple Festival in October.

Former President Jimmy Carter owned a pine-cabin second home in Ellijay. Other tourists are attracted to the mountains and whitewater kayaking.

== History ==
This area was long settled by cultures of indigenous peoples. It was known as part of the historic homeland of the Cherokee people until the US government's policy of ethnic cleansing of Native Americans from the Southern States saw them forcibly displaced to Oklahoma in 1838. They had a village here, at the confluence of the Ellijay and Cartecay Rivers, which together form the Coosawattee River. About 4,000 Cherokees died in the ensuing trek to Oklahoma.

Ellijay (sometimes formerly spelled "Elejoy") is the anglicized form or transliteration of the Cherokee name Elatseyi, meaning "new ground". Other sources say it means "green place".

Gilmer County was organized by territory cut from Cherokee County in 1832, and Ellijay was designated as its county seat in 1834. It was a fairly isolated and remote mountain community until the late 19th century. After the Marietta and Northern Georgia Railroad (later the Louisville and Nashville Railroad) was constructed through here in 1884, the railroad stimulated a boom in the timber industry by providing a profitable way to get lumber to markets. Many timber companies came into the area with their workers.

More than a century later, another major transportation improvement was construction of the Zell Miller Mountain Parkway (Georgia 515, named for Georgia governor and U.S. Senator Zell Miller), which was completed in 1991.

== Geography ==
According to the United States Census Bureau, the city has a total area of 3.6 square miles (9.2 km^{2}), all land. It is situated at the confluence of the Ellijay and Cartecay Rivers, which together form the Coosawattee River. The Coosawattee flows west as part of the Oostanaula/Coosa/Alabama River watershed. The county seat is bordered to the east and south by the city of East Ellijay.

=== Climate ===
Ellijay lies within the Humid subtropical climate zone along with the majority of the rest of the Southeastern United States. The highest elevations in the surrounding region reside in the oceanic climate. Ellijay enjoys cool winters and warm summers, but neither would be considered extreme due to its slightly higher elevation than other areas in the south. Winter snowfall is common, but generally on the lighter side. A few exceptions exist, one being the 1993 Storm of the Century, which dropped 17 inches of snow in Ellijay. Summers are warm, though mild for southern standards, with temperatures topping out in the mid 80s during the summer. Rain is evenly distributed throughout the year, averaging 57.97 inches per year, as reported from the nearest NOAA reporting station in Jasper, Georgia.

Climate data for Jasper, Georgia (1991–2020 normals)
Month	Jan	Feb	Mar	Apr	May	Jun	Jul	Aug	Sep	Oct	Nov	Dec	Year
Mean daily maximum °F (°C)	47.5 (8.6)	51.7 (10.9)	59.8 (15.4)	68.4 (20.2)	75.2 (24.0)	81.6 (27.6)	84.5 (29.2)	83.6 (28.7)	78.8 (26.0)	69.0 (20.6)	58.7 (14.8)	50.8 (10.4)	67.4 (19.7)
Mean daily minimum °F (°C)	31.1 (−0.5)	33.7 (0.9)	40.0 (4.4)	47.2 (8.4)	55.5 (13.1)	58.1 (14.5)	63.3 (17.4)	66.1 (18.9)	60.7 (15.9)	49.7 (9.8)	39.9 (4.4)	34.7 (1.5)	49.1 (9.5)
Average precipitation inches (mm)	5.53 (140)	5.03 (128)	5.89 (150)	5.07 (129)	4.31 (109)	4.88 (124)	4.60 (117)	4.59 (117)	4.18 (106)	4.01 (102)	4.55 (116)	5.33 (135)	57.97 (1,473)
Source: NOAA

== Demographics ==
Historical population
Census	Pop.	Note	%±
1880	200		—
1890	437		118.5%
1900	581		33.0%
1910	659		13.4%
1920	632		−4.1%
1930	657		4.0%
1940	1,497		127.9%
1950	1,527		2.0%
1960	1,320		−13.6%
1970	1,326		0.5%
1980	1,507		13.7%
1990	1,178		−21.8%
2000	1,584		34.5%
2010	1,619		2.2%
2020	1,862		15.0%
U.S. Decennial Census

=== 2020 census ===
As of the 2020 census, Ellijay had a population of 1,862. The median age was 41.1 years. 23.7% of residents were under the age of 18 and 25.6% of residents were 65 years of age or older. For every 100 females there were 88.1 males, and for every 100 females age 18 and over there were 85.1 males age 18 and over.

90.4% of residents lived in urban areas, while 9.6% lived in rural areas.

There were 727 households in Ellijay, of which 28.9% had children under the age of 18 living in them. Of all households, 39.8% were married-couple households, 19.0% were households with a male householder and no spouse or partner present, and 37.3% were households with a female householder and no spouse or partner present. About 36.7% of all households were made up of individuals and 22.4% had someone living alone who was 65 years of age or older.

There were 829 housing units, of which 12.3% were vacant. The homeowner vacancy rate was 1.0% and the rental vacancy rate was 5.9%.

Racial composition as of the 2020 census
Race	Number	Percent
White	1,271	68.3%
Black or African American	3	0.2%
American Indian and Alaska Native	74	4.0%
Asian	7	0.4%
Native Hawaiian and Other Pacific Islander	0	0.0%
Some other race	393	21.1%
Two or more races	114	6.1%
Hispanic or Latino (of any race)	588	31.6%

=== 2000 census ===
As of the census of 2000, 1,584 people, 593 households, and 342 families lived in the city. The population density was 591.7 inhabitants per square mile (228.5/km^{2}). The 662 housing units had an average density of 247.3 units per square mile (95.5 units/km^{2}). The racial makeup of the city was 81.25% White, 1.39% African American, 0.00% Native American, 1.70% Asian, 0.57% Pacific Islander, 12.50% from other races, and 2.46% from two or more races. Hispanics or Latinos of any race were 25.19% of the population.

Of the 593 households, 26.8% had children under 18 living with them, 36.1% were married couples living together, 16.5% had a female householder with no husband present, and 42.2% were not families. About 37.6% of all households were made up of individuals, and 20.4% had someone living alone who was 65 or older. The average household size was 2.49, and the average family size was 3.14.

In the city, the age distribution was 22.9% under 18, 10.5% from 18 to 24, 25.0% from 25 to 44, 19.7% from 45 to 64, and 21.9% who were 65 or older. The median age was 38 years. For every 100 females, there were 93.2 males. For every 100 females 18 and over, there were 88.9 males.

The median income for a household in the city was $22,120, and for a family was $36,250. Males had a median income of $21,875 versus $20,469 for females. The per capita income for the city was $13,740. About 20.3% of families and 27.5% of the population were below the poverty line, including 27.3% of those under 18 and 31.7% of those 65 or over.

== Government ==
Ellijay is governed by a five-member city council and a mayor. The current mayor is William Albert "Al" Hoyle (since 1997).

== Education ==
=== Gilmer County School District ===
The Gilmer County School District holds preschool to grade 12, and consists of three elementary schools, one middle school, and one high school. There is also Crossroads, which is the alternative school in Ellijay.

- Ellijay Elementary School
- Mountain View Elementary School
- Clear Creek Elementary School
- Oakland Elementary School (closed in 2011, due to county budget constraints)
- Clear Creek Middle School
- Gilmer High School
- Mountain Innovation Program

=== Private schools ===
- North Georgia Christian Academy
- Pleasant Hills Montessori School
- Grace Christian School
- Josephine Edwards Christian School
- Mountain Academy
- First Baptist Church Preschool
- Children's First Preschool

=== Higher education ===
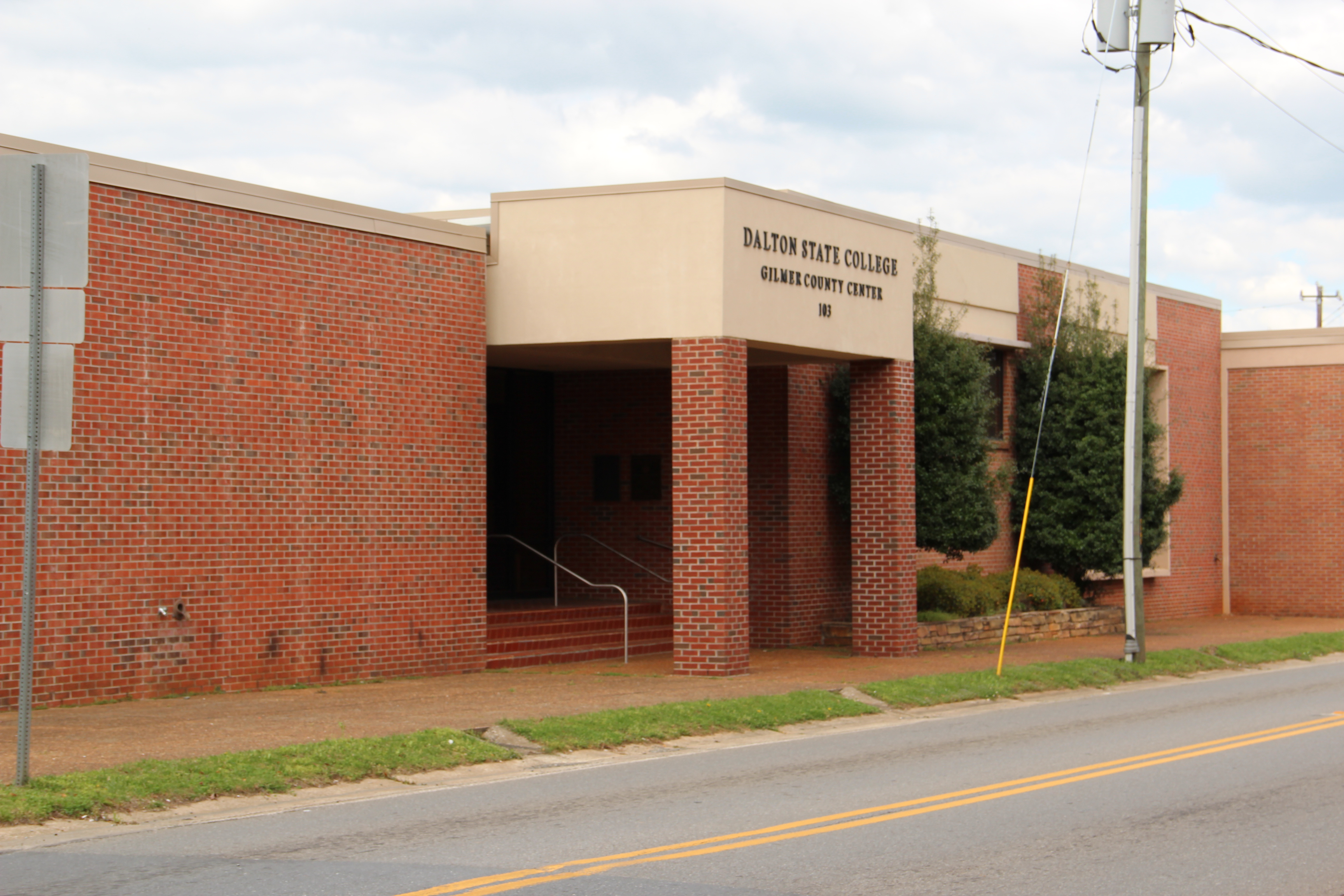
Dalton State College Gilmer County Center

The Dalton State College Appalachian Campus - Gilmer County Center is a satellite campus of Dalton State College.

== Ku Klux Klan ==
According to the Southern Poverty Law Center, one of America's final active chapters of the Ku Klux Klan, the United Northern and Southern Knights of the Ku Klux Klan, is headquartered in Ellijay.

== Notable people ==
- Jerry Bird (1943-present), a pioneer in formation skydiving, was born in Ellijay.
- John Davis (1965–present) was a starting offensive lineman with the Buffalo Bills and an All-American guard for the Georgia Tech Yellow Jackets.
- Col. Oscar Poole (1930–2020) was a longtime Methodist minister and radio personality whose Uncle Sam suit became a fixture at Republican events, where he promoted his Ellijay BBQ restaurant.
- Johnny Quarles (1946–2008), a Western author, wrote over a dozen novels and television screenplays, including the iconic titles Brack and Fool's Gold, many of them featuring Ellijay settings.
- Jay Allen Sanford (1960–present), author and cartoonist, is best known as the co-creator of Rock 'N' Roll Comics, and for his work with Revolutionary Comics, Carnal Comics, and the San Diego Reader.
