= Gilmer County, Georgia =

County in Georgia, United States

- County
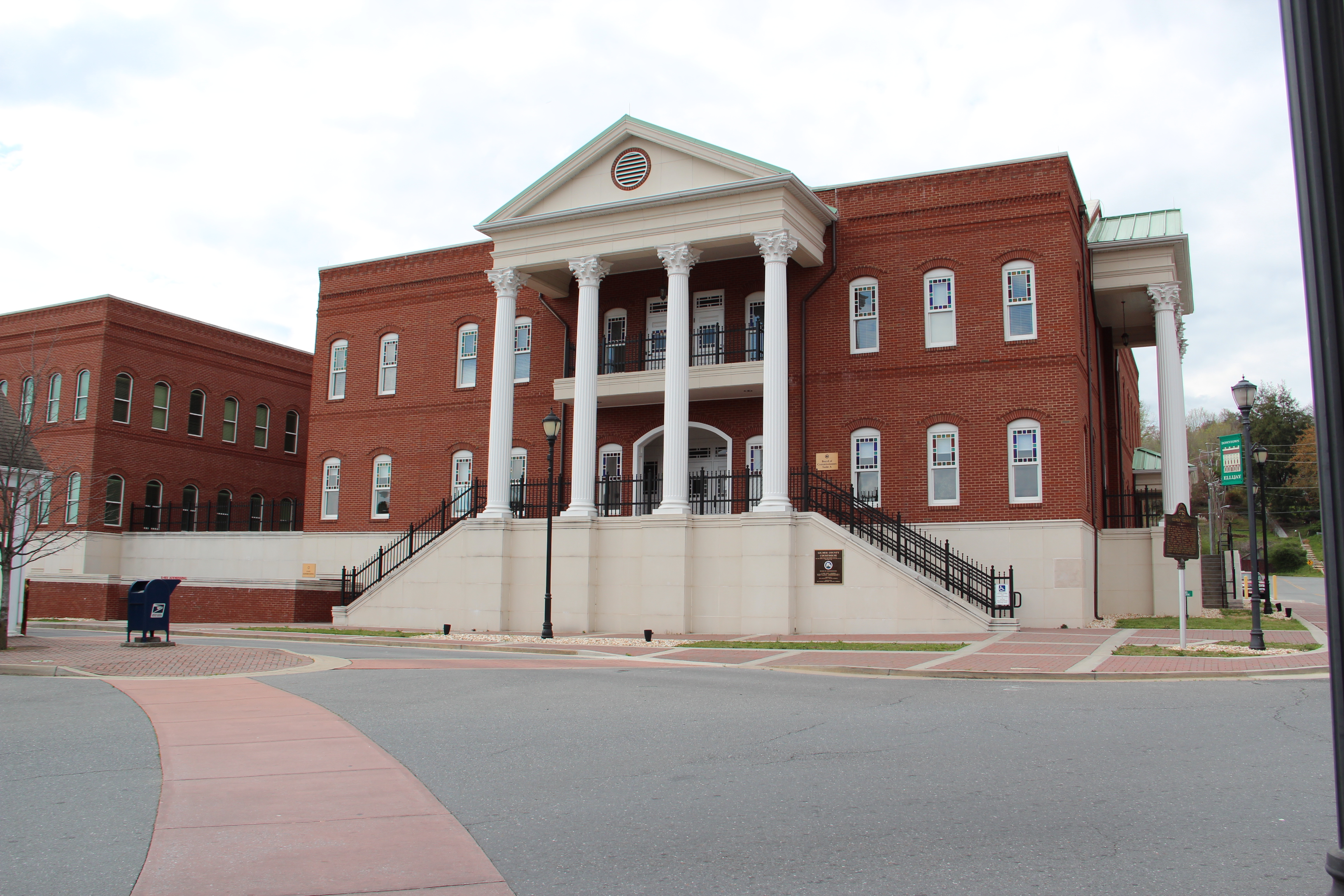
- Gilmer County courthouse in Ellijay

- Seal

- Location within the U.S. state of Georgia
- Coordinates: 34°41′N 84°28′W
- Country: United States
- State: Georgia
- Founded: 1832; 194 years ago
- Named for: George Rockingham Gilmer
- Seat: Ellijay
- Largest city: Ellijay

Area
  - Total: 431 sq mi (1,120 km^{2})
  - Land: 427 sq mi (1,110 km^{2})
  - Water: 4.7 sq mi (12 km^{2}) 1.1%

Population (2020)
  - Total: 31,353
  - Estimate (2025): 33,894 ▲
  - Density: 73/sq mi (28/km^{2})
- Time zone: UTC−5 (Eastern)
  - Summer (DST): UTC−4 (EDT)
- Congressional district: 9th
- Website: www.gilmercounty-ga.gov

Gilmer County is a county in the Northwest region of the U.S. state of Georgia. As of the 2020 census, its population was 31,353. The county seat is Ellijay. named for a historic Cherokee town also spelled as Elejoy in the 18th century. The county was created on December 3, 1832, and was named for George Rockingham Gilmer, a politician who served two nonconsecutive terms as governor of the state. Gilmer County is home of the annual Apple Festival, which is held in mid-October. About 90% of the land area is in cropland and forest. Poultry raising and processing make up the largest portion of the agricultural economy, which generates 33.2% of the total revenues. Manufacturing is about 20%.

== History ==
The area was long inhabited by cultures of indigenous peoples. It was part of the homeland of the Cherokee. They had a village, Elatseyi, meaning "new ground". Other sources say it means "green place". It was sometimes spelled "Elejoy" on 18th-century colonial maps. It was located at the confluence of the Ellijay and Cartecay Rivers, which create the Coosawattee River. The later European-American town of Ellijay developed at this site.

In 1832, Gilmer County was organized as Georgia started to encroach on Cherokee territory. Ellijay was designated as the county seat in 1834.

On January 12, 1854, parts of Gilmer County, as well as parts of neighboring Union County, were taken to form the newly created Fannin County, Georgia.

The area was an infamous hotbed for illegal moonshine operations in the Prohibition era. ATF agent Duff Floyd patrolled both Gilmer County and nearby Dawson County for many years.

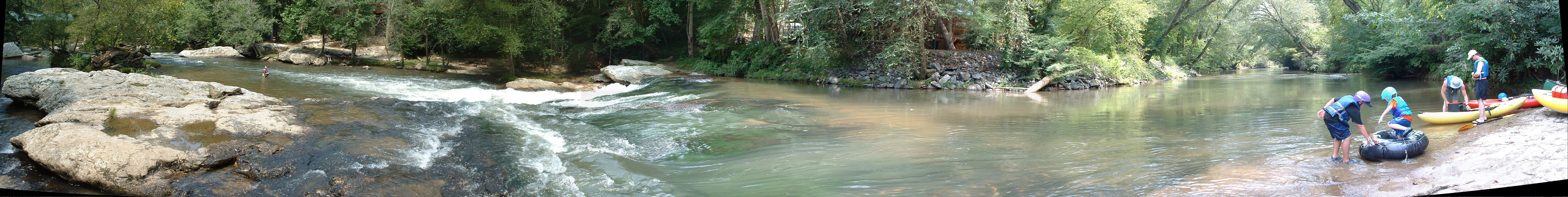
Blackberry Falls rapid on the Cartecay River near Ellijay

This is still a primarily rural county, with agriculture and forests supporting the economy. It also has a growing tourist sector, some based on whitewater kayaking and canoeing on the rivers in the area.

== Economy ==
Farming is still important, although, by 2002, the area of land in the county devoted to agriculture had declined to 24,700 acres. Most farms are sized at 10-49 acres, or 50-179 acres. Poultry raising and processing make up the largest portion of the agricultural economy. Agriculture and directly related businesses, such as landscape services, generate $565.1 million, or 33.2% of the county's economic output. Manufacturing generates $351.4 million, or 20.6%.

== Geography ==
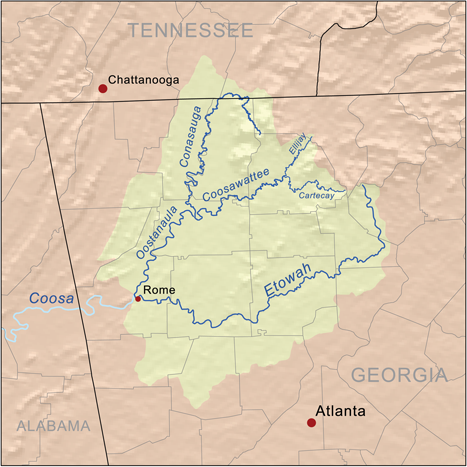

According to the U.S. Census Bureau, the county has a total area of 431 square miles (1,120 km^{2}), of which 4.7 square miles (12 km^{2}) (1.1%) are covered by water. The county is located in the Blue Ridge Mountains.

The vast majority of Gilmer County is located in the Coosawattee River sub-basin in the ACT River Basin (Coosa-Tallapoosa River Basin). Three very small parts of the eastern and northern edges of the county are located in the Conasauga River sub-basin of the ACT River Basin, while slightly larger portions of the northern and eastern border areas of Gilmer County are located in the Ocoee River sub-basin of the Middle Tennessee-Hiwassee basin.

=== Adjacent counties ===
- Fannin County (north)
- Dawson County (southeast)
- Pickens County (south)
- Gordon County (southwest)
- Murray County (west)

=== National protected area ===
- Chattahoochee National Forest (part)

== Transportation ==
=== Major highways ===
- U.S. Route 76
- State Route 2
- State Route 5 / State Route 515
- State Route 52
- State Route 136
- State Route 282
- State Route 382

=== Secondary highways ===
- Old S.R. 5
- Yukon Road
- Burnt Mountain Road (Old S.R. 108)
- Boardtown Road
- Big Creek Road
- Doublehead Gap Road
- Whitestone Road
- Conasauga Road

== Demographics ==
Historical population
| Census | Pop. | Note | %± |
|---|---|---|---|
| 1840 | 2,536 | | — |
| 1850 | 8,440 | | 232.8% |
| 1860 | 6,724 | | −20.3% |
| 1870 | 6,644 | | −1.2% |
| 1880 | 8,386 | | 26.2% |
| 1890 | 9,074 | | 8.2% |
| 1900 | 10,198 | | 12.4% |
| 1910 | 9,237 | | −9.4% |
| 1920 | 8,406 | | −9.0% |
| 1930 | 7,344 | | −12.6% |
| 1940 | 9,001 | | 22.6% |
| 1950 | 9,963 | | 10.7% |
| 1960 | 8,922 | | −10.4% |
| 1970 | 8,956 | | 0.4% |
| 1980 | 11,110 | | 24.1% |
| 1990 | 13,368 | | 20.3% |
| 2000 | 23,456 | | 75.5% |
| 2010 | 28,292 | | 20.6% |
| 2020 | 31,353 | | 10.8% |
| 2025 (est.) | 33,894 | ▲ | 8.1% |
U.S. Decennial Census; 1790-1880 1890-1910; 1920-1930 1930-1940; 1940-1950 1960-1980; 1980-2000 2010

=== Racial and ethnic composition ===
Gilmer County, Georgia – Racial and ethnic composition Note: the US Census treats Hispanic/Latino as an ethnic category. This table excludes Latinos from the racial categories and assigns them to a separate category. Hispanics/Latinos may be of any race.
| Race / Ethnicity (NH = Non-Hispanic) | Pop 1980 | Pop 1990 | Pop 2000 | Pop 2010 | Pop 2020 | % 1980 | % 1990 | % 2000 | % 2010 | % 2020 |
|---|---|---|---|---|---|---|---|---|---|---|
| White alone (NH) | 10,999 | 13,193 | 21,287 | 25,078 | 26,365 | 99.00% | 98.69% | 90.75% | 88.64% | 84.09% |
| Black or African American alone (NH) | 22 | 37 | 51 | 98 | 127 | 0.20% | 0.28% | 0.22% | 0.35% | 0.41% |
| Native American or Alaska Native alone (NH) | 6 | 15 | 81 | 72 | 62 | 0.05% | 0.11% | 0.35% | 0.25% | 0.20% |
| Asian alone (NH) | 5 | 20 | 35 | 65 | 131 | 0.05% | 0.15% | 0.15% | 0.23% | 0.42% |
| Native Hawaiian or Pacific Islander alone (NH) | x | x | 18 | 15 | 0 | x | x | 0.08% | 0.05% | 0.00% |
| Other race alone (NH) | 0 | 1 | 3 | 18 | 82 | 0.00% | 0.01% | 0.01% | 0.06% | 0.26% |
| Mixed race or Multiracial (NH) | x | x | 166 | 269 | 987 | x | x | 0.71% | 0.95% | 3.15% |
| Hispanic or Latino (any race) | 78 | 102 | 1,815 | 2,677 | 3,599 | 0.70% | 0.76% | 7.74% | 9.46% | 11.48% |
| Total | 11,110 | 13,368 | 23,456 | 28,292 | 31,353 | 100.00% | 100.00% | 100.00% | 100.00% | 100.00% |

=== 2020 census ===
As of the 2020 census, the county had a population of 31,353, 12,832 households, and 8,028 families residing in the county. The median age was 49.4 years, 18.9% of residents were under the age of 18, and 26.4% were 65 years of age or older. For every 100 females there were 98.8 males, and for every 100 females age 18 and over there were 98.3 males age 18 and over; 21.5% of residents lived in urban areas, while 78.5% lived in rural areas.

The racial makeup of the county was 86.0% White, 0.5% Black or African American, 0.8% American Indian and Alaska Native, 0.5% Asian, 0.0% Native Hawaiian and Pacific Islander, 6.5% from some other race, and 5.7% from two or more races. Hispanic or Latino residents of any race comprised 11.5% of the population.

Of the 12,832 households in the county, 23.8% had children under the age of 18 living with them and 22.1% had a female householder with no spouse or partner present. About 26.0% of all households were made up of individuals and 14.2% had someone living alone who was 65 years of age or older.

There were 17,717 housing units, of which 27.6% were vacant. Among occupied housing units, 79.4% were owner-occupied and 20.6% were renter-occupied. The homeowner vacancy rate was 1.8% and the rental vacancy rate was 11.5%.

=== 2010 census ===
As of the 2010 United States census, 28,292 people, 11,314 households, and 8,000 families lived in the county. The population density was 66.3 inhabitants per square mile (25.6/km^{2}). There were 16,564 housing units at an average density of 38.8 units per square mile (15.0 units/km^{2}). The racial makeup of the county was 92.3% White, 0.5% Black or African American, 0.3% Asian, 0.3% American Indian, 0.1% Pacific islander, 5.2% from other races, and 1.3% from two or more races. Those of Hispanic or Latino origin, of any race, made up 9.5% of the population. In terms of ancestry, non-Hispanic people identified as 18.7% being Irish, 17.3% American, 16.3% English ancestry, and 13.4% German.

Of the 11,314 households, 29.2% had children under 18 living with them, 57.2% were married couples living together, 8.9% had a female householder with no husband present, 29.3% were not families, and 24.5% of all households were made up of individuals. The average household size was 2.48 and the average family size was 2.92. The median age was 43.4 years.

The median income for a household in the county was $36,741 and for a family was $45,317. Males had a median income of $32,177 versus $27,288 for females. The per capita income for the county was $20,439. About 12.4% of families and 18.1% of the population were below the poverty line, including 24.1% of those under 18 and 8.0% of those 65 or over.

=== 2000 census ===
As of the census of 2000, 23,456 people, 9,071 households, and 6,694 families were living in the county. uncited estimate The population density was 55 people per square mile (21 people/km^{2}). The 11,924 housing units had an average density of 28 units per square mile (11 units/km^{2}). The racial makeup of the county was 93.63% White, 0.27% Black or African American, 0.46% Native American, 0.23% Asian, 0.26% Pacific Islander, 3.76% from other races, and 1.39% from two or more races. About 7.74% of the population were Hispanic or Latino of any race.

Of the 9,071 households, 30.9% had children under 18 living with them, 61.1% were married couples living together, 8.4% had a female householder with no husband present, and 26.2% were not families. Around 22.2% of all households were made up of individuals, and 8.6% had someone living alone who was 65 or older. The average household size was 2.57 and the average family size was 2.96.

In the county, the age distribution was 24.3% under18, 8.50% from 18 to 24, 28.50% from 25 to 44, 25.60% from 45 to 64, and 13.10% who were 65 or older. The median age was 37 years. For every 100 females, there were 103.00 males. For every 100 females 18 and over, there were 101.30 males.

The median income for a household in the county was $34,330, and for a family was $41,805. Males had a median income of $31,217 versus $24,020 for females. The per capita income for the county was $18,117. About 17.8% of families and 23.0% of the population were below the poverty line, including 29.6% of those under 18 and 10.6% of those 65 or over.

== Government and politics ==
Gilmer County is governed by a three-member board of commissioners. Charlie Paris has been the Chairman since January 1, 2015. The Post 1 commissioner is Hubert Parker and the Post 2 commissioner is Karleen Ferguson. Other current government officials include: Sheriff, Stacy Nicholson; Probate Judge, Scott Chastain; Magistrate Judge, Kevin Johnson; Clerk of Court, Amy Johnson; Tax Commissioner, Rebecca Marshall; Coroner, Jerry Hensley. All are members of the Republican Party.

Some of the past chairmen of the board of commissioners include J.C. Sanford (2011–2014), Mark Chastain (2009–2010), Jerry Farist (2005–2008), and Rayburn Smith (1997–2004). Merle Howell served as the first chairman of the three-member board starting on January 1, 1996. She was recalled by the voters of Gilmer County, who elected Rayburn Smith in July 1997.

Until 1988, Gilmer County was governed by a sole commissioner. Cicero Logan served as commissioner from 1946 until 1959. Harold Hefner was elected in 1958 and served from 1959 until 1972. Gilmer County's last sole commissioner was Benjamin N. Whitaker, who served from 1973 until 1988.

In 1988, Gilmer County changed to a five-member board of commissioners, who then hired a “county manager” to run day-to-day operations of the county. The first five-member board included Mack Logan, Ruel Reece, Garvin Davis Jr., John Penland, and Charles Aaron. Jim Bailey served as county manager.

=== Politics ===
The voters of Gilmer, like neighboring Rabun, Towns, Pickens, and Fannin Counties, were different in their historic partisan preferences from other parts of Georgia. Since the post-Civil War period, it had a competitive Republican party. At the turn of the 20th century, the disfranchisement of most Blacks in Georgia resulted in the state's White conservatives voting mostly for Democratic candidates at the state and national level. In contrast, these northern Georgia counties voted for Republican presidential candidates in several early 20th-century elections.

As of the 2020s, Gilmer County is a strongly Republican voting county, voting 81% for Donald Trump in 2024. For elections to the United States House of Representatives, Gilmer County is part of Georgia's 9th congressional district, currently represented by Andrew Clyde. For elections to the Georgia State Senate, Gilmer County is part of District 51. For elections to the Georgia House of Representatives, Gilmer County is part of District 7.

United States presidential election results for Gilmer County, Georgia
| Year | Republican | | Democratic | | Third party(ies) | |
| Year | No. | % | No. | % | No. | % |
|---|---|---|---|---|---|---|
| 1912 | 52 | 7.93% | 488 | 74.39% | 116 | 17.68% |
| 1916 | 258 | 16.54% | 742 | 47.56% | 560 | 35.90% |
| 1920 | 662 | 54.80% | 546 | 45.20% | 0 | 0.00% |
| 1924 | 912 | 54.03% | 776 | 45.97% | 0 | 0.00% |
| 1928 | 1,012 | 65.67% | 529 | 34.33% | 0 | 0.00% |
| 1932 | 616 | 33.73% | 1,210 | 66.27% | 0 | 0.00% |
| 1936 | 1,047 | 48.14% | 1,128 | 51.86% | 0 | 0.00% |
| 1940 | 653 | 42.93% | 865 | 56.87% | 3 | 0.20% |
| 1944 | 793 | 47.29% | 884 | 52.71% | 0 | 0.00% |
| 1948 | 1,203 | 47.36% | 1,275 | 50.20% | 62 | 2.44% |
| 1952 | 1,324 | 49.35% | 1,359 | 50.65% | 0 | 0.00% |
| 1956 | 1,857 | 59.29% | 1,275 | 40.71% | 0 | 0.00% |
| 1960 | 1,850 | 55.69% | 1,472 | 44.31% | 0 | 0.00% |
| 1964 | 2,167 | 50.09% | 2,159 | 49.91% | 0 | 0.00% |
| 1968 | 2,074 | 51.55% | 690 | 17.15% | 1,259 | 31.30% |
| 1972 | 2,729 | 78.04% | 768 | 21.96% | 0 | 0.00% |
| 1976 | 1,261 | 33.54% | 2,499 | 66.46% | 0 | 0.00% |
| 1980 | 2,170 | 47.83% | 2,246 | 49.50% | 121 | 2.67% |
| 1984 | 2,972 | 70.66% | 1,234 | 29.34% | 0 | 0.00% |
| 1988 | 3,353 | 70.65% | 1,363 | 28.72% | 30 | 0.63% |
| 1992 | 2,661 | 45.19% | 2,311 | 39.25% | 916 | 15.56% |
| 1996 | 3,121 | 49.06% | 2,464 | 38.74% | 776 | 12.20% |
| 2000 | 4,941 | 67.04% | 2,230 | 30.26% | 199 | 2.70% |
| 2004 | 7,414 | 73.97% | 2,510 | 25.04% | 99 | 0.99% |
| 2008 | 8,408 | 75.17% | 2,614 | 23.37% | 164 | 1.47% |
| 2012 | 8,926 | 80.76% | 1,958 | 17.71% | 169 | 1.53% |
| 2016 | 10,477 | 81.55% | 1,965 | 15.29% | 406 | 3.16% |
| 2020 | 13,429 | 81.25% | 2,932 | 17.74% | 166 | 1.00% |
| 2024 | 14,976 | 81.03% | 3,413 | 18.47% | 92 | 0.50% |

United States Senate election results for Gilmer County, Georgia2
| Year | Republican | | Democratic | | Third party(ies) | |
| Year | No. | % | No. | % | No. | % |
|---|---|---|---|---|---|---|
| 2020 | 13,206 | 80.98% | 2,715 | 16.65% | 386 | 2.37% |
| 2020 | 12,163 | 82.03% | 2,664 | 17.97% | 0 | 0.00% |

United States Senate election results for Gilmer County, Georgia3
| Year | Republican | | Democratic | | Third party(ies) | |
| Year | No. | % | No. | % | No. | % |
|---|---|---|---|---|---|---|
| 2020 | 7,711 | 47.60% | 1,897 | 11.71% | 6,593 | 40.70% |
| 2020 | 12,132 | 81.81% | 2,697 | 18.19% | 0 | 0.00% |
| 2022 | 11,159 | 79.67% | 2,523 | 18.01% | 325 | 2.32% |
| 2022 | 10,391 | 81.54% | 2,352 | 18.46% | 0 | 0.00% |

Georgia Gubernatorial election results for Gilmer County
| Year | Republican | | Democratic | | Third party(ies) | |
| Year | No. | % | No. | % | No. | % |
|---|---|---|---|---|---|---|
| 2022 | 11,952 | 84.85% | 2,010 | 14.27% | 124 | 0.88% |

== Attractions ==
Gilmer County is home to an impressive specimen of yellow poplar known colloquially as "the big poplar". This particular specimen is 100 feet tall and about 20 feet in circumference at its base. The tree can be accessed via Bear Creek Trail in the Chattahoochee National Forest.

== Communities ==
=== Cities ===
- Ellijay
- East Ellijay

=== Census-designated place ===
- Cherry Log

=== Unincorporated communities ===
- Ai
- Tails Creek
- Whitepath
- Yukon

== Education ==
The Gilmer County School District has five schools, including the Gilmer High School.

== In popular culture ==
James Dickey's novel Deliverance was set on a fictional river modeled on the Coosawattee, prior to the construction of the dam producing Carters Lake. It was adapted as a 1972 thriller movie of the same name. It was filmed further north in the state, in Rabun County.

Dickey's 'The Selected Poems' (1998), edited by Robert Kirschten, begins with a ten-page poem entitled 'May Day Sermon to the Women of Gilmer County, Georgia, by a Woman Preacher Leaving the Baptist Church', taken from his book 'Poems 1957 - 67'.

== See also ==
- National Register of Historic Places listings in Gilmer County, Georgia
- List of counties in Georgia
