= Georgia State Route 102 =

State highway in Georgia, United States

State Route 102
- SR 102 highlighted in red

Route information
- Maintained by GDOT
- Length: 32.0 mi (51.5 km)

Major junctions
- West end: SR 15 in Warthen
- SR 123 in Mitchell; SR 171 in Gibson; SR 296 in Stapleton
- East end: SR 17 / SR 80 in Wrens

Location
- Country: United States
- State: Georgia
- Counties: Washington, Glascock, Jefferson

Highway system
- Georgia State Highway System; Interstate; US; State; Special
← SR 101	→ SR 103

State Route 102 (SR 102) is a 32.0-mile-long (51.5 km) state highway in the east-central part of the U.S. state of Georgia. The highway travels from Warthen northeast through Mitchell, east through Gibson, southeast to Avera, and arcing east to Wrens.

== Route description ==
SR 102 begins at an intersection with SR 15 in Warthen, in the north-central part of Washington County. The highway travels to the northeast, and crosses the Ogeechee River into Glascock County, before intersecting SR 123 (Mitchell–Shoals–Jewell Road) in Mitchell. Beginning with a short northeast portion, the highway turns east to an intersection with SR 171 in Gibson. The two highways have a one-block concurrency. SR 102 heads east, and, then, southeast to enter Jefferson County and then the town of Avera. It arcs to Stapleton, where it intersects SR 296. The two highways have a one-block concurrency. Finally, it arcs to its eastern terminus in Wrens, at an intersection with SR 17 (Thomson Road) and SR 80 (Stapleton Highway).

SR 102 is not part of the National Highway System, a system of roadways important to the nation's economy, defense, and mobility.

== Major intersections ==
County	Location	mi	km	Destinations	Notes
Washington	Warthen	0.0	0.0	SR 15 (Warthen Road) – Sandersville, Sparta	Western terminus
Washington		1.6	2.6	Hamburg State Park Road – Hamburg State Park	former SR 248
Glascock	Agricola	8.5	13.7	Hamburg-Agricola Road – Hamburg State Park	former SR 102 Connector
Glascock	Mitchell	10.5	16.9	SR 123 north (Mitchell–Shoals–Jewell Road) / Edgehill-Mitchell Road south – Edgehill, Shoals, Jewell, Warrenton, Sparta	Southern terminus of SR 123
Glascock	Gibson	17.1	27.5	SR 171 south (Calhoun Street) – Edgehill, Louisville	West end of SR 171 concurrency
Glascock	Gibson	17.1	27.5	SR 171 north (Warren Street) – Warrenton	East end of SR 171 concurrency
Jefferson	Stapleton	27.4	44.1	SR 296 south (Harvey Street) – Louisville	West end of SR 296 concurrency
Jefferson	Stapleton	27.4	44.1	SR 296 north (George Street) – Thomson	East end of SR 296 concurrency
Jefferson	Wrens	32.0	51.5	SR 17 (Thomson Road) / SR 80 (Stapleton Highway) – Louisville, Waynesboro, Thomson	Eastern terminus
1.000 mi = 1.609 km; 1.000 km = 0.621 mi: Concurrency terminus

== Hamburg-Agricola Road ==
State Route 102 Connector
- Hamburg-Agricola Road
- Location: Hamburg–Agricola
- Existed: 1948–1954

Hamburg-Agricola Road is a 3.5 miles (5.6 km) major road in the east-central part of the U.S. state of Georgia. It connects the Hamburg State Park in Washington County to Agricola in Glascock County. From 1948 to 1954, it was labeled as State Route 102 Connector (SR 102 Conn.).

History

SR 102 Connector was established in 1948 as a connector route between Hamburg State Park and Agricola, when its parent route was rerouted onto a straighter alignment between Warthen and Mitchell via the unincorporated community of Agricola. By 1954, SR 102 Connector was decommissioned.

Major intersections

County	Location	mi	km	Destinations	Notes
Washington	Hamburg	0.0	0.0	Hamburg State Park Road – S.R. 16, Jewell, Warthen	western terminus; former SR 248
Glascock	Agricola	3.5	5.6	SR 102 – Mitchell, Warthen	eastern terminus
1.000 mi = 1.609 km; 1.000 km = 0.621 mi

== See also ==
- Georgia State Route 248
