= Georgia State Route 16 =

State highway in central Georgia

State Route 16
- Georgia State Route 16 highlighted in red

Route information
- Maintained by GDOT
- Length: 178.54 mi (287.33 km)
- Existed: 1919–present

Major junctions
- West end: SR 100 northwest of Mount Zion
- US 27 / US 27 Alt. / SR 1 / SR 166 in Carrollton; US 29 / SR 14 / SR 34 in Newnan; US 27 Alt. / US 29 / SR 14 near East Newnan; US 19 / US 41 / SR 3 / SR 155 in Griffin; I-75 south of Locust Grove; US 23 / SR 36 / SR 42 in Jackson; US 129 / US 441 / SR 24 in Eatonton; US 129 Bus. / US 441 Bus. / SR 24 Bus. / SR 44 in Eatonton
- East end: US 278 / SR 12 in Warrenton

Location
- Country: United States
- State: Georgia
- Counties: Haralson, Carroll, Coweta, Spalding, Butts, Jasper, Putnam, Hancock, Warren

Highway system
- Georgia State Highway System; Interstate; US; State; Special
← I-16	→ SR 16S

State Route 16 (SR 16) is a 178.54-mile-long (287.33 km) state highway that travels west-to-east through portions of Haralson, Carroll, Coweta, Spalding, Butts, Jasper, Putnam, Hancock, and Warren counties in the western and central parts of the U.S. state of Georgia. The highway connects the southeastern portion of Carroll County, northwest of Mount Zion to Warrenton, via Carrollton, Newnan, Griffin, Monticello, Eatonton, and Sparta.

SR 16 formerly traveled on the current path of US 278 Byp./SR 12 Byp. in Warrenton, SR 80 and SR 17 Conn., and the entire length of SR 296 west of Wrens, in Glascock and Jefferson counties.

== Route description ==
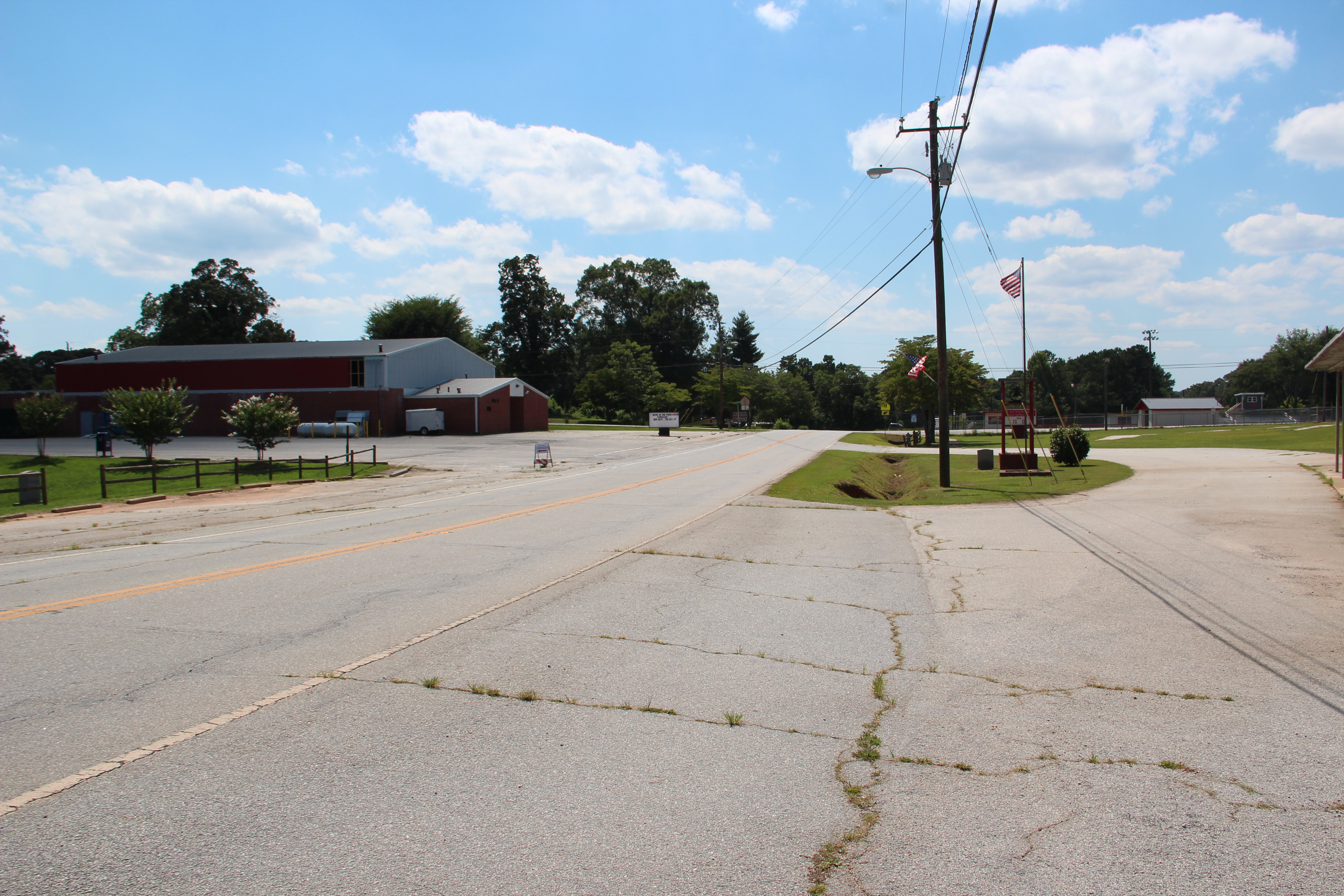
SR 16 in Mount Zion.

SR 16 starts just south of Interstate 20 (I-20) in southwestern Haralson County, and travels southeast into Carroll County and Carrollton, where it begins a concurrency with US 27 Alt./SR 1. SR 16 continues through Whitesburg and crosses into Coweta County and through Newnan, where its concurrency with US 27 Alt. ends, crossing I-85 on the southeastern edge of East Newnan.

Turning sharply east, the highway travels through Sharpsburg, turns slightly southeast, and travels through Senoia into Spalding County, turning back east, and traveling into Griffin. Turning slightly northeast, SR 16 crosses I-75 at the county line with Butts County and travels into and through Jackson on into Monticello in Jasper County.

Continuing east, the route crosses into Putnam County, through Eatonton, then turns southeast at the county line with Hancock County, heading on into Sparta. Turning first slightly northeast, then southeast, SR 16 continues into Warren County, where it turns northeast once more and on to its eastern terminus in Warrenton.

There are four portions of SR 16 that are part of the National Highway System, a system of routes determined to be the most important for the nation's economy, mobility, and defense:

- Approximately 5 miles (8.0 km) in Carrollton, most of it concurrent with US 27/SR 1 and SR 166
- The entire length of the concurrency with US 29/SR 14, from Newnan to south of East Newnan.
- From US 19/US 41/SR 3 in Griffin east to I-75, approximately 7 miles (11 km) south-southeast of Locust Grove
- The portion concurrent with SR 15 in Sparta

== History ==
=== 1920s and 1930s ===
SR 16 was established at least as early as 1919 on its current path from Carrollton to Warrenton. By the end of September 1921, it was extended west-southwest to the Alabama state line./ By October 1926, this extension was redesignated as part of a southern segment of SR 8. Two segments of SR 16 had a "completed hard surface": a portion in the southern part of Newnan and from Griffin to just east of the Henry–Butts county line. Between October 1929 and June 1930, a portion of SR 16 west-southwest of Griffin was completed. Later in 1930, the Spalding County portion of the Sharpsburg–Griffin segment was completed. About four years later, a portion north-northwest of Newnan was completed. At the end of the next year, the Jasper County portion of the Jackson–Monticello segment was completed. During the third quarter of 1936, a portion south-southeast of Newnan was completed. About a year later, a small portion in the eastern part of Monticello was completed. At the end of the year, it was completed from Monticello to Murder Creek. Later in 1938, three segments were completed: the Newnan–Senoia segment, the Jasper County portion of Monticello–Eatonton segment, and the Sparta–Warrenton segment. By the middle of the next year, two segments were completed: the Butts County portion of the Jackson–Monticello segment and a portion in the western part of Eatonton. At the end of the year, SR 16 was extended east-northeast on SR 12 for a very short distance in Warrenton and then on a sole path southeast to SR 17 north-northeast of Stapleton.

=== 1940s and 1950s ===
Between April and October 1940, SR 16 was extended south-southwest to SR 80 in Stapleton and then south-southeast to US 1/SR 4/SR 17 north-northeast of Louisville. All of SR 16 from the Coweta–Spalding county line to Eatonton was completed. In 1942, the Senoia–Griffin segment was completed. Between the beginning of 1945 and November 1946, two segments were hard surfaced: the Carrollton–Newnan segment and a portion northwest of Sparta. Between February 1948 and April 1949, the Putnam County portion of the Eatonton–Sparta segment was hard surfaced. By August 1950, US 27 Alt. was designated on SR 16 from Carrollton to south-southeast of Newnan. The entire Eatonton–Sparta segment of SR 16 was hard surfaced. In 1952, the path of SR 16 southeast of Warrenton was shifted southward (and slightly extended to the east-southeast to SR 17 in the northwest part of Wrens). This replaced the path of SR 16S. The former part of SR 16 from southeast of Warrenton to northwest of Wrens was redesignated as SR 16 Conn. The former part from northwest of Wrens to north of Louisville was redesignated as SR 16 Conn. Between June 1955 and July 1957, the Warrenton–Wrens segment was paved.

=== 1970s to 1990s ===
In 1971, a bypass of the main part of Carrollton was proposed from SR 166 southwest of the city to SR 166 east-northeast of the city. In 1973, SR 16 was extended west-northwest to its current western terminus. In Warrenton, the path of SR 16 was shifted southward, replacing SR 16 Spur. The western part of the former route was redesignated as SR 12 Conn. Between the beginning of 1979 and March 1980, a more direct path of SR 16, designated SR 721, was proposed from the eastern part of Griffin to the interchange with I-75 west-southwest of Jackson. Later in 1980, the path of US 27 Alt./SR 16/SR 166 in Carrollton was shifted southward, out of the main part of the city, onto the previously proposed bypass. SR 16 then traveled north on a concurrency with US 27/SR 1 to its original intersection with those two highways. In 1983, the path of SR 16, from Griffin to west-southwest of Jackson, was shifted southward, replacing the proposed path of SR 721. In 1989, the eastern terminus of the highway was truncated to its current terminus in Warrenton, replacing SR 12 Conn. The path of SR 80 was shifted eastward, replacing the Warrenton–Wrens segment of SR 16. The former segment of SR 16 in Warrenton was redesignated as US 278 Byp./SR 12 Byp.

== Major intersections ==
County	Location	mi	km	Destinations	Notes
Haralson		0.000	0.000	SR 100 to I-20	Western terminus
Carroll	Carrollton	13.829	22.256	US 27 north / SR 1 north (North Park Street) – Bremen, Cedartown	Western end of US 27/SR 1 concurrency
Carroll	Carrollton	14.196	22.846	South Street – Historic Downtown	Interchange
Carroll	Carrollton	15.499	24.943	US 27 south / SR 1 south / SR 166 west – LaGrange, Bowdon	Interchange; eastern end of US 27/SR 1 concurrency; western end of US 27 Alt. and SR 166 concurrencies; Wayne Shackelford Interchange
Carroll	Carrollton	17.213	27.702	SR 166 east – Villa Rica, Atlanta	Eastern end of SR 166 concurrency
Carroll	Whitesburg	27.288	43.916	SR 5 – Douglasville, Roopville, McIntosh Reserve Park	Roundabout
Coweta		35.705	57.462	SR 34 Byp. (Millard Farmer Industrial Boulevard) to I-85 – Peachtree City, Franklin	Truck route to SR 16 east / US 27 Alt. south / SR 14 south / US 29 south / SR 34 east
Coweta	Newnan	36.475	58.701	SR 34 west (Franklin Road) – Franklin	Western end of SR 34 concurrency
Coweta	Newnan	37.679	60.638	US 29 north (Jackson Street) / SR 14 north – Palmetto	Western end of US 29/SR 14 concurrency
Coweta	Newnan	37.850	60.914	SR 34 east (Posey Place / Jefferson Street) to I-85 – Peachtree City	Eastern end of SR 34 concurrency
Coweta	East Newnan	41.492	66.775	US 27 Alt. south / US 29 south / SR 14 south to I-85 – Moreland, LaGrange, Greenville	Eastern end of US 27 Alt. and US 29/SR 14 concurrencies; truck route to SR 16 west / US 27 Alt. north / SR 14 north / US 29 north / SR 34 west
Coweta	Turin	50.102	80.631	SR 54 – Sharpsburg, Luthersville	
Coweta	Senoia	56.806	91.420	SR 74 / SR 85 – Fayetteville, Haralson	
Spalding	Griffin	72.749	117.078	US 19 / US 41 / SR 3 (M.L. King Jr. Parkway) – Atlanta, Barnesville, Sunny Side, Sun City Peachtree	Interchange
Spalding	Griffin	73.311	117.983	US 19 Bus. north / US 41 Bus. north / SR 92 north (Atlanta Road) – Fayetteville, UGA Griffin Campus, Atlanta Motor Speedway	Western end of US 19 Bus./US 41 Bus. concurrency; southern terminus of SR 92
Spalding	Griffin	74.633	120.110	US 19 Bus. south / US 41 Bus. south / SR 155 (Hill Street) – McDonough, Zebulon, Airport	Eastern end of US 19 Bus./US 41 Bus. concurrency
Butts		85.390	137.422	I-75 (SR 401) – Atlanta, Macon	I-75 exit 205
Butts	Jackson	93.025	149.709	US 23 north / SR 42 north (Brookwood Avenue) to I-75 – McDonough	Western end of US 23/SR 42 concurrency
Butts	Jackson	93.482	150.445	SR 36 west (Mulberry Street) – Barnesville	Western end of SR 36 concurrency
Butts	Jackson	93.761	150.894	SR 36 east (Covington Street) – Covington, Jackson Lake	Eastern end of SR 36 concurrency
Butts	Jackson	94.178	151.565	US 23 south / SR 42 south (Macon Avenue) – Indian Springs, Macon, Flovilla, Forsyth	Eastern end of US 23/SR 42 concurrency
Ocmulgee River		101.528	163.393	Charles Thomas Edwards Memorial Bridge	
Jasper	Monticello	110.414	177.694	SR 212 west – Covington	Western end of SR 212 concurrency
Jasper	Monticello	111.013	178.658	SR 11 / SR 83 (Forsyth Street / Warren Street) to I-20 – Forsyth, Macon, Madison, Monroe, Atlanta	Traffic circle around Monticello Square
Jasper		112.369	180.840	SR 212 east – Milledgeville	Eastern end of SR 212 concurrency
Jasper		114.137	183.686	SR 380 west (Perimeter Road)	Eastern terminus of SR 380
Putnam	Willard	123.192	198.258	SR 142 west – Shady Dale	Eastern terminus of SR 142
Putnam	Eatonton	127.456	205.121	US 129 / US 441 / SR 24 (West Bypass) – Milledgeville, Madison	
Putnam	Eatonton	128.696	207.116	US 129 Bus. north / US 441 Bus. north / SR 24 Bus. north (Jefferson Avenue) – Madison, Rock Eagle	Western end of US 129 Bus./US 441 Bus./SR 24 Bus. concurrency
Putnam	Eatonton	128.771	207.237	US 129 Bus. south / US 441 Bus. south / SR 24 Bus. south / SR 44 west (Jefferson Avenue) – Milledgeville, Gray	Eastern end of US 129 Bus./US 441 Bus./SR 24 Bus. concurrency; western end of SR 44 concurrency
Putnam	Eatonton	130.008	209.228	SR 44 east – Greensboro, Lake Oconee	Eastern end of SR 44 concurrency
Hancock	Shoulderbone	147.427	237.261	SR 77 north – Union Point	Southern terminus of SR 77
Hancock		154.577	248.768	SR 15 north / SR 22 east – Greensboro, Crawfordville	Western end of SR 15 and SR 22 concurrencies
Hancock	Sparta	155.278	249.896	SR 22 west (Broad Street) – Milledgeville, Macon	Eastern end of SR 22 concurrency
Hancock	Sparta	155.596	250.407	SR 15 south – Sandersville, Wrightsville	Eastern end of SR 15 concurrency
Warren		169.817	273.294	SR 123 south – Mitchell	Northern terminus of SR 123
Warren	Warrenton	178.192	286.772	US 278 Byp. / SR 12 Byp. (Legion Road) to I-20 / US 278 west / SR 12 east / SR 171 – Norwood, Thomson, Camak	Also signed as US 278 Truck/SR 12 Truck; former SR 16 Spur
Warren	Warrenton	178.538	287.329	US 278 / SR 12 (West Main Street) – Norwood, Thomson	Eastern terminus
1.000 mi = 1.609 km; 1.000 km = 0.621 mi: Concurrency terminus

== Special routes ==
=== Warrenton spur route ===
State Route 16 Spur
- Location: Warrenton
- Existed: 1957–1990

State Route 16 Spur (SR 16 Spur) was a spur route of SR 16 that existed completely within the city limits of Warrenton. Between June 1955 and July 1957, it was established from an intersection with SR 16 in the southwestern part of the city to another intersection with SR 16 in the southeastern part. In 1973, the path of SR 16 in the city was shifted southward, replacing all of the spur route, except for the western part. The western part of its former path was redesignated as SR 12 Conn. Between the beginning of 1984 and the beginning of 1991, SR 16 Spur was redesignated as US 278 Byp./SR 12 Byp.

This table shows the 1957–1973 intersections. The entire route was in Warrenton, Warren County.

mi	km	Destinations	Notes
		SR 16	Western terminus
		SR 80	
		SR 16	Eastern terminus
1.000 mi = 1.609 km; 1.000 km = 0.621 mi

=== Warren County connector route (1952–1981) ===
State Route 16 Connector
- Location: Warren County
- Existed: 1952–1981

State Route 16 Connector (SR 16 Conn.) was a connector route of SR 16 that existed entirely within Warren County. In 1952, the path of SR 16 southeast of Warrenton was shifted southward, replacing the path of SR 16S. The portion of SR 16 from southeast of Warrenton to northwest of Wrens was redesignated as SR 16 Conn., while the portion from northwest of Wrens to north of Louisville was redesignated as SR 16 Conn. This highway traveled from SR 16 southeast of Warrenton to SR 17 about halfway between Wrens and Thomson. Between June 1955 and July 1957, this highway was paved. In 1981, it was decommissioned.

The entire route was in Warren County.

Location	mi	km	Destinations	Notes
			SR 16	Western terminus
			SR 17	Eastern terminus
1.000 mi = 1.609 km; 1.000 km = 0.621 mi

=== Warren County connector route (1982–1989) ===
State Route 16 Connector
- Location: Warren County
- Existed: 1982–1989

State Route 16 Connector (SR 16 Conn.) was a connector route of SR 16 that existed entirely within Warren County. In 1982, it was established from an intersection with SR 16 southeast of Warrenton to an intersection with SR 17 about halfway between Wrens and Thomson. In 1989, this highway was redesignated as SR 17 Conn.

The entire route was in Warren County.

Location	mi	km	Destinations	Notes
			SR 16	Western terminus
			SR 17	Eastern terminus
1.000 mi = 1.609 km; 1.000 km = 0.621 mi

=== Jefferson–Warren County connector route ===
State Route 16 Connector
- Location: Jefferson, Glascock, and Warren counties
- Existed: 1952–1953

State Route 16 Connector (SR 16 Conn.) was a very short-lived connector route of SR 16 that existed in portions of Jefferson, Glascock, and Warren counties. In 1952, the path of SR 16 southeast of Warrenton was shifted southward, replacing the path of SR 16S. The former portion of SR 16 from southeast of Warrenton to northwest of Wrens was redesignated as SR 16 Conn., while the former portion from northwest of Wrens to north of Louisville was redesignated as SR 16 Conn. Later in 1953, it was redesignated as SR 296.

County	Location	mi	km	Destinations	Notes
Jefferson				US 1 / SR 4 / SR 17	Southern terminus
Jefferson	Stapleton			SR 80	
Jefferson				SR 16	
Glascock	No major junctions				
Warren				SR 17	Northern terminus
1.000 mi = 1.609 km; 1.000 km = 0.621 mi
