= Georgia State Route 80 =

State highway in Georgia, United States

State Route 80
- Georgia State Route 80 highlighted in red

Route information
- Maintained by GDOT
- Length: 83.90 mi (135.02 km)

Major junctions
- North end: US 78 / SR 10 / SR 17 southeast of Washington
- I-20 northeast of Camak; US 278 / US 278 Byp. / SR 12 / SR 12 Byp. in Warrenton; US 1 / US 221 / SR 4 / SR 17 / SR 88 / SR 540 in Wrens; US 25 / SR 24 / SR 56 / SR 121 in Waynesboro; US 25 Byp. / SR 121 Byp. in Waynesboro
- East end: SR 56 Spur northeast of Shell Bluff

Location
- Country: United States
- State: Georgia
- Counties: Wilkes, Warren, Glascock, Jefferson, Burke

Highway system
- Georgia State Highway System; Interstate; US; State; Special
← US 80	→ SR 81

State Route 80 (SR 80) is an 83.90-mile-long (135.02 km) state highway that predominantly travels in a southwest–northeast direction in the east-central part of the U.S. state of Georgia. It exists within portions of Wilkes, Warren, Glascock, Jefferson, and Burke counties. It connects the Washington area with the northern part of Burke County, via Warrenton, Wrens, and Waynesboro.

== Route description ==
SR 80 begins at an intersection with US 78/SR 10/SR 17, southeast of Washington in Wilkes County. It heads south-southeast and crosses over the Little River at the meeting point of Wilkes, Warren, and McDuffie counties. For approximately 2 miles (3.2 km), the highway runs along the Warren–McDuffie county line, then enters Warren County proper. In Cedar Rock, it intersects the former western terminus of SR 223. Almost immediately is an interchange with Interstate 20 (I-20). Then, it heads southwest, passing through Camak, and heads toward Warrenton. Just before entering the city limits, it intersects the northern terminus of SR 80 Alternate (VFW Road). In town it has an intersection with US 278/SR 12/SR 80 Alternate. This intersection also marks the eastern terminus of US 278 Bypass/SR 12 Bypass. US 278 Bypass/SR 12 Bypass/SR 80 begin a concurrency around the southeast edge of town. Approximately 2,000 feet (610 m) later, SR 80 splits off to the southeast. It intersects the western terminus of SR 17 Connector (Purvis School Road) on the Warren–Glascock county line. It passes through rural areas of Glascock County, without any major intersections, and crosses into Jefferson County. SR 80 continues to the southeast, intersecting SR 296, before meeting SR 17. The two highways head concurrently into Wrens. At the intersection with SR 102, which heads west-northwest, SR 80 departs to the east on Stapleton Highway. About two blocks later is US 1/US 221/SR 4/SR 88/SR 540 (Main Street). Here, SR 80/SR 88 head to the east. At Waynesboro Road, SR 80 splits off to the south-southeast. It travels through rural areas of the county and passes into Burke County. The route curves to the east and meets SR 305. It curves to the southeast before heading east-southeast. The highway begins a concurrency with SR 24 just before entering Waynesboro. About 1,000 feet (300 m) later, SR 56. At the intersection with US 25/SR 121 (Liberty Street), SR 24 turns right, while SR 56/SR 80 continue through town. They meet US 25 Bypass/SR 121 Bypass. The two highways continue to the northeast, and curve to the north-northeast, before splitting. SR 80 heads northeast and intersects SR 23 in the unincorporated community of Shell Bluff. The highway continues to the northeast, until it meets its eastern terminus, an intersection with SR 56 Spur, northeast of Shell Bluff.

The only portion of SR 80 that is part of the National Highway System, a system of routes determined to be the most important for the nation's economy, mobility, and defense, is the brief concurrency with SR 17 in the Wrens area.

== Major intersections ==
County	Location	mi	km	Destinations	Notes
Burke		0.000	0.000	SR 56 Spur north (River Road) / Shell Bluff Landing Road north – McBean	Southern terminus; southern terminus of SR 56 Spur; roadway continues as Shell Bluff Landing Road
Burke	Shell Bluff	4.931	7.936	SR 23 – Girard, McBean, Plant Vogtle	
Burke		8.942	14.391	SR 56 north (Mike Padgett Highway) – McBean	Eastern end of SR 56 concurrency
Burke		9.871	15.886	Frank M. Cates Bridge over Brier Creek	
Burke	Waynesboro	12.220	19.666	US 25 Byp. / SR 121 Byp. (Burke Veterans Parkway) – Millen, Augusta, Burke County High School	
Burke	Waynesboro	13.517	21.754	US 25 / SR 24 east / SR 121 (Liberty Street) – Millen, Statesboro, Augusta	Eastern end of SR 24 concurrency
Burke		14.838	23.879	SR 56 south / Lovers Lane north – Midville	Western end of SR 56 concurrency; southern terminus of Lovers Lane
Burke		15.074	24.259	SR 24 west – Louisville	Western end of SR 24 concurrency
Burke		26.898	43.288	SR 305 – Vidette, Keysville	
Jefferson	Wrens	37.758	60.766	SR 88 north (Broad Street) – Matthews, Keysville	Eastern end of SR 88 concurrency
Jefferson	Wrens	38.284	61.612	US 1 / US 221 / SR 4 / SR 88 south / SR 540 (Main Street / Fall Line Freeway) – Louisville, Augusta, Soperton, Harlem, Sandersville	Western end of SR 88 concurrency
Jefferson	Wrens	38.511	61.977	SR 17 south (Thomson Highway) / SR 102 west (Stapleton Highway) – Louisville, Stapleton, Four Seasons Golf Club	Southern end of SR 17 concurrency; eastern terminus of SR 102
Jefferson		40.427	65.061	SR 17 north – Thomson	Northern end of SR 17 concurrency
Jefferson		43.206	69.533	SR 296 (George Street) – Stapleton	
Glascock	No major junctions				
Warren–Glascock county line		51.937	83.584	SR 17 Conn. east (Purvis School Road) / County Line Road west to SR 17	Western terminus of SR 17 Conn.; eastern terminus of County Line Road
Warren	Warrenton	59.871	96.353	US 278 Byp. west / SR 12 Byp. west (Legion Road) to I-20 west – Gibson, Macon, Sparta	Southern end of US 278 Byp./SR 12 Byp. concurrency
Warren	Warrenton	60.289	97.026	US 278 (East Main Street / SR 12 / SR 80 Alt. north) / US 278 Byp. ends / SR 12 Byp. ends – Norwood, Crawfordville, Thomson, Warrenton Downtown Historic District	Northern end of US 278 Byp./SR 12 Byp. concurrency; eastern terminus of US 278 Byp./SR 12 Byp.; southern terminus of SR 80 Alt.
Warren		61.541	99.041	SR 80 Alt. south (VFW Road) – Thomson, Augusta	Northern terminus of SR 80 Alt.
Warren	Cedar Rock	67.144	108.058	I-20 (Carl Sanders Highway / SR 402) – Atlanta, Augusta	I-20 exit 165
Warren	Cedar Rock	67.669	108.903	Cedar Rock Road east – Thomson	Western terminus of Cedar Rock Road; former SR 223 east
Warren	Cadley	71.135	114.481	Cadley Road west	Eastern terminus of Cadley Road; former SR 223 west
Wilkes–Warren–McDuffie county tripoint	No major junctions				
Wilkes		83.904	135.030	US 78 / SR 10 / SR 17 (Thomson Road) – Elberton, Thomson, Washington, Athens	Northern terminus
1.000 mi = 1.609 km; 1.000 km = 0.621 mi: Concurrency terminus

== Special routes ==
=== Burke County alternate route ===
State Route 80 Alternate
- Location: Burke County
- Existed: 1952–1953

State Route 80 Alternate (SR 80 Alt.) was a very short-lived alternate route of SR 80 that existed in the northern part of Burke County. In 1952, it was established from SR 80 northeast of Waynesboro northeast to the shore of the Savannah River. Between January and September 1953, it was decommissioned.

The entire route was in Burke County.

Location	mi	km	Destinations	Notes
			SR 80	Southern terminus
			Shore of Savannah River	Northern terminus
1.000 mi = 1.609 km; 1.000 km = 0.621 mi

=== Warrenton alternate route ===
State Route 80 Alternate
- Location: Northeast of Warrenton
- Length: 2.1 mi (3.4 km)

State Route 80 Alternate (SR 80 Alt.) is a 2.1-mile-long (3.4 km) alternate route that exists entirely within the north central part of Warren County. The southernmost portion is within the city limits of Warrenton.

It begins at an intersection with US 278/SR 12 (East Main Street), as well as US 278 Byp./SR 12 Byp./SR 80 (Legion Drive), in the east-central part of Warrenton. Starting at its southern terminus, SR 80 Alt. is concurrent with US 278/SR 12 to the east. The three highways curve to the northeast, cross over some railroad tracks of Norfolk Southern Railway, and intersect the northern terminus of Queens Way. Here, SR 80 Alt. splits off to the north-northwest on V.F.W. Road. It heads northwest and curves to a more northerly direction until it meets its eastern terminus, a second intersection with the SR 80 mainline, northeast of Warrenton.

The entire route is in Warren County.

Location	mi	km	Destinations	Notes
Warrenton	0.0	0.0	US 278 west / SR 12 west (East Main Street) to SR 16 – Atlanta, Warrenton Downtown Historic District US 278 Byp. west / SR 12 Byp. west / SR 80 (Legion Drive) to I-20 / SR 171 – Wrens, Macon, Gibson	Southern terminus of SR 80 Alt.; eastern terminus of US 278 Byp./SR 12 Byp.; southern end of US 278/SR 12 concurrency
	1.1	1.8	US 278 east / SR 12 east (Thomson Highway) / Queens Way south – Thomson	Northern end of US 278/SR 12 concurrency; northern terminus of Queens Way
	2.0– 2.1	3.2– 3.4	SR 80 (Washington Highway) – Warrenton, Camak	Northern terminus
1.000 mi = 1.609 km; 1.000 km = 0.621 mi: Concurrency terminus
