= Special routes of U.S. Route 278 =

Special routes of U.S. Route 278

Highway system
- United States Numbered Highway System; List; Special; Divided

Nine special routes of U.S. Route 278 currently exist. Four of them lie within the state of Arkansas. One more existed in the past but has since been decommissioned.

== Arkansas ==
=== Hope business route ===
Hervey Street
- Location: Hope, Arkansas
- Length: 1.15 mi (1.85 km)
- Existed: 1990s–present

U.S. Route 278B (US 278B and Hwy. 278B) is a 1.15-mile (1.85 km) business route of U.S. Route 278 in Hempstead County, Arkansas.

Route description

The route's northern terminus is at US 278 near Interstate 30 along the outside of Hope. The route runs south as Hervey Street through downtown Hope past the Foster House and the Bill Clinton Birthplace both two properties being National Register of Historic Places (NRHP) listed. The route terminates at US 67.

Major intersections

The entire route is in Hope, Hempstead County.

mi	km	Destinations	Notes
0.00	0.00	US 278 (Commerce Boulevard)	Northern terminus
1.15	1.85	US 67 (3rd Street)	Southern terminus
1.000 mi = 1.609 km; 1.000 km = 0.621 mi

=== Camden business route ===
Washington Street
- Location: Camden, Arkansas
- Length: 1.88 mi (3.03 km)
- Existed: 1998–present

U.S. Route 278B (US 278B and Hwy. 278B), formerly Highway 4B, is a 2.97-mile (4.78 km) business route of U.S. Route 278 (formerly Highway 4) in Ouachita County, Arkansas.

Major intersections

The entire route is in Camden, Ouachita County.

mi	km	Destinations	Notes
0.00	0.00	US 278	Western terminus
1.88	3.03	US 79B (Street)	Eastern terminus
1.000 mi = 1.609 km; 1.000 km = 0.621 mi

=== Warren business route ===
U.S. Highway 278B
- Location: Warren, Arkansas
- Length: 3.99 mi (6.42 km)
- Existed: 1998–present

U.S. Route 278B (US 278B and Hwy. 278B), formerly Highway 4B, is a 3.99-mile (6.42 km) business route of U.S. Route 278 (formerly Highway 4) in Bradley County, Arkansas.

Major intersections

The entire route is in Warren, Bradley County.

mi	km	Destinations	Notes
0.00	0.00	US 278	Western terminus
2.23	3.59	US 63 / AR 8 (Martin St)	
2.66– 2.87	4.28– 4.62	US 63B (S Main Street)	US 63B overlap
3.99	6.42	US 278	
1.000 mi = 1.609 km; 1.000 km = 0.621 mi: Concurrency terminus

=== Monticello bypass route ===
U.S. Route 278 Bypass
- Location: Monticello, Arkansas
- Length: 8.5 mi (13.7 km)
- Existed: October 11, 2018–present

U.S. Route 278 Bypass (US 278 Bypass and Hwy. 278 Bypass) is a 8.5-mile (13.7 km) two-lane expressway bypass route of U.S. Route 278 that opened to traffic on October 11, 2018. Despite its designation, the route only meets US 278 at its eastern terminus and does not connect back to US 278 west of Monticello. The route was created as a placeholder until it is fully upgraded to interstate standards and designated as Interstate 69.

Major Junctions

The entire route is in Monticello, Drew County.

mi	km	Destinations	Notes
		US 425 – Monticello	Southern terminus; access to University of Arkansas at Monticello
		Midway Route	
		AR 35	
		US 278 – Monticello	Northern terminus
1.000 mi = 1.609 km; 1.000 km = 0.621 mi

== Georgia ==
=== Rockmart business loop ===
U.S. Highway 278 Business
- Location: Rockmart, Georgia
- Length: 3.2 mi (5.1 km)
- Existed: 1994–present

U.S. Route 278 Business (US 278 Bus.) is a 3.2-mile-long (5.1 km) business route of US 278. Nearly the entire road is within the city limits of Rockmart. Its entire length is concurrent with State Route 6 Business (SR 6 Bus.).

US 278 Bus./SR 6 Bus. begins at an intersection with US 278/SR 6 west of Rockmart. It travels to the southeast and immediately crosses over the Silver Comet Trail. The roadway is known as Cedartown Highway until an intersection with Prospect Road. Then it is known as Elm Street. It enters the city limits of Rockmart and passes by Rose Hill Cemetery. Then, it crosses over Euharlee Creek and the Silver Comet Trail again on the Raymond Lester Bridge. The highway then curves to the east, at an intersection with Slate Street. At Piedmont Avenue, the business route turns to the north, remaining along that street for the rest of its journey. At an intersection with Clearwater Street, it curves to the north-northwest. Finally, it ends an intersection with US 278/SR 6/SR 101.

In 1991, SR 6 Bus. was established on its current path. Between the beginning of 1989 and the beginning of 1995, US 278 Bus. was established on the path of SR 6 Bus.

The entire route is in Polk County.

Location	mi	km	Destinations	Notes
	0.0	0.0	US 278 begins / SR 6 / SR 6 Bus. – Cedartown, Rockmart	Western terminus of US 278 Bus./SR 6 Bus.; western end of SR 6 Bus. concurrency
Rockmart	1.5	2.4	Raymond Lester Bridge	Crossing over Euharlee Creek
Rockmart	3.2	5.1	US 278 / SR 6 (Nathan Dean Parkway) / SR 101 / SR 6 Bus. ends – Cedartown, Dallas, Rome, Aragon	Eastern terminus of US 278 Bus./SR 6 Bus.; eastern end of SR 6 Bus. concurrency
1.000 mi = 1.609 km; 1.000 km = 0.621 mi: Concurrency terminus

=== Madison truck route ===
U.S. Highway 278 Truck
- Location: Madison, Georgia
- Length: 5.6 mi (9.0 km)

U.S. Route 278 Truck (US 278 Truck) is a truck route of US 278 that travels south of downtown Madison. The entire length is also concurrent with SR 12 Truck (SR 12 Trk.). It also has concurrencies with SR 24 Spur, US 129/US 441/SR 24, and US 129/US 441 Bypass/US 441 Truck/SR 24 Byp./SR 24 Truck.

US 278 Truck/SR 12 Truck begins at mainline US 278/SR 12 and SR 83, which turns northeast at a fork in the road as those routes head into historic downtown Madison. At this intersection, SR 24 Spur (Ward Road), which also begins here, has a concurrency with US 278 Truck/SR 12 Truck. The three highways curve southeast until they reach US 129/US 441/SR 24. They turn south onto a concurrency with these highways. At this intersection, the SR 24 Spur ends. The highways travel to the south until they reach an intersection with the southern terminus of US 129 Byp./US 441 Byp./US 441 Truck/SR 24 Byp./SR 24 Truck. Here, US 278 Truck/SR 12 Truck follows US 129 Byp./US 441 Byp./US 441 Truck/SR 24 Byp./SR 24 Truck. US 278 Truck/SR 12 Truck ends at US 278/SR 12 as well as US 129/US 441/SR 24 just northeast of the city.

The only portion of US 278 Truck and SR 12 Truck that is part of the National Highway System, a system of routes determined to be the most important for the nation's economy, mobility, and defense, is the portion concurrent with US 129/US 441/SR 24.

The entire route is in Morgan County.

Location	mi	km	Destinations	Notes
Madison	0.0	0.0	US 278 / SR 12 / SR 83 (South Main Street) / SR 12 Truck begins / SR 24 Spur begins – Hard Labor Creek State Park	Western terminus of US 278 Truck/SR 12 Truck; northern terminus of SR 24 Spur; western end of SR 24 Spur concurrency
Madison	0.4	0.64	US 129 north / US 441 north / SR 24 north (Eatonton Road) / SR 24 Spur ends – Athens	Southern terminus of SR 24 Spur; eastern end of SR 24 concurrency; western end of US 129/US 441/SR 24 concurrency
Madison	1.4	2.3	US 129 south / US 441 south / SR 24 south (Eatonton Road) / US 129 Byp. begins / US 441 Byp. begins / US 441 Truck begins / SR 24 Byp. begins / SR 24 Truck begins (Madison Bypass) to Lions Club Road west / I-20 – Eatonton	Eastern end of US 129/US 441/SR 24 concurrency; southern terminus of US 129 Byp./US 441 Byp./US 441 Truck/SR 24 Byp./SR 24 Truck; eastern terminus of Lions Club Road; western end of US 129 Byp./US 441 Byp./US 441 Truck/SR 24 Byp./SR 24 Truck concurrency
	5.6	9.0	US 129 / US 441 / SR 24 / US 278 / SR 12 / US 129 Byp. ends / US 441 Byp. ends / US 441 Truck ends / SR 24 Byp. ends / SR 24 Truck ends – Madison, Athens, Watkinsville, Greensboro	Eastern terminus of US 278 Truck/SR 12 Truck; northern terminus of US 129 Byp./US 441 Byp./US 441 Truck/SR 24 Byp./SR 24 Truck; eastern end of US 129 Byp./US 441 Byp./US 441 Truck/SR 24 Byp./SR 24 Truck concurrency
1.000 mi = 1.609 km; 1.000 km = 0.621 mi: Concurrency terminus

=== Warrenton bypass route ===
U.S. Highway 278 Bypass
- Location: Warrenton, Georgia
- Length: 1.6 mi (2.6 km)
- Existed: 1989–present

U.S. Route 278 Bypass (US 278 Byp.) is a 1.6-mile-long (2.6 km) bypass route of US 278 that exists entirely within the city limits of Warrenton, Georgia. The entire length is completely concurrent with SR 12 Bypass (SR 12 Byp.). Banner signage along the highway mostly use "Truck" instead of "Bypass." It is known as Legion Drive for its entire length.

US 278 Byp./SR 12 Byp. begins at mainline US 278/SR 12, which turns from southeast to straight east as those highways head into historic downtown Warrenton. It crosses over Goldens Creek and then crosses over a former Central of Georgia Railway line before encountering the intersection with SR 16, which is the former path of SR 12 Conn. After the intersection of Shoal Street, the highway begins to curve east in front of the right-of-way of a former connecting ramp to SR 16. The road serves as the northern terminus of SR 171 across from the Warren School Bus Shop, and then begins to curve to the northeast, even more so when it approaches SR 80 (Quaker Road) which joins the bypass in a concurrency. US 278 Byp./SR 12 Byp. ends at a second intersection with US 278/SR 12, and SR 80 continues north towards Waynesboro and Shell Bluff.

The roadway that would eventually become US 278/SR 12 was established between July 1957 and June 1960 as SR 16 Spur from SR 16 in the south-southwest part of the city to SR 16 in the southeast part of the city. In 1973, SR 16 was shifted onto most of the path of SR 16 Spur (except for its western end. The former path of SR 16 was redesignated as SR 12 Conn. In 1989, SR 16's path in the city was reverted to its former path, replacing SR 12 Spur. The former path of SR 16 was redesignated as US 278 Byp./SR 12 Byp.

The entire route is in Warrenton, Warren County.

mi	km	Destinations	Notes
0.0	0.0	US 278 / SR 12 / SR 12 Byp. begins to I-20 west – Crawfordville, Warrenton, Warrenton Downtown Historic District	Western terminus of US 278 Byp./SR 12 Byp.; west end of SR 12 Byp. concurrency
0.3	0.48	SR 16 (Macon Highway) – Sparta, Warrenton	Former SR 12 Conn.
0.9	1.4	SR 171 south (Gibson Street) – Gibson	Northern terminus of SR 171
1.2	1.9	SR 80 south (Quaker Road) – Wrens	West end of SR 80 concurrency; former SR 16
1.6	2.6	US 278 / SR 12 / SR 80 Alt. north (East Main Street) / SR 12 Byp. ends / SR 80 north (Legion Drive) to I-20 east / SR 16 – Thomson, Augusta, Camak, Washington	Eastern terminus of US 278 Byp./SR 12 Byp.; southern terminus of SR 80 Alt.; east end of SR 12 Byp. concurrency
1.000 mi = 1.609 km; 1.000 km = 0.621 mi: Concurrency terminus

=== Warrenton connector route ===
State Route 12 Connector
- Location: Warrenton, Georgia
- Length: 0.554 mi (892 m)
- Existed: 1973–1989

State Route 12 Connector (SR 12 Conn.) was a 2,925-foot-long (892 m) connector route of SR 12 that existed mostly within the city limits of Warrenton, Georgia. Between July 1957 and June 1960, SR 16 Spur was established between two intersections with SR 16 in the southern part of Warrenton. In 1973, SR 16 was shifted mostly onto the path of SR 16 Spur. Its former path was redesignated as SR 12 Conn. In 1989, SR 16 was reverted to its previous path, replacing SR 12 Conn.

The entire route was in Warren County.

Location	mi	km	Destinations	Notes
	0.000	0.000	SR 16	Southern terminus
Warrenton	0.374	0.602	SR 16 Spur east	Western terminus of SR 16 Spur
Warrenton	0.554	0.892	US 278 / SR 12	Northern terminus
1.000 mi = 1.609 km; 1.000 km = 0.621 mi

== South Carolina ==
=== Ridgeland connector route ===
U.S. Highway 278 Connector
- Location: Ridgeland, South Carolina
- Length: 0.060 mi (97 m)

U.S. Route 278 Connector (US 278 Conn.) is a 0.060-mile (97 m) connector route of US 278 that is entirely within the city limits of Ridgeland. It connects US 278 and SC 336 Conn., via 3rd Avenue and Russell Street. It is an unsigned highway.

=== Hilton Head business route ===
U.S. Highway 278 Business
- Location: Hilton Head Island, South Carolina
- Length: 8.990 mi (14.468 km)
- Existed: 1998–present

U.S. Route 278 Business (US 278 Bus.) is a 8.990-mile (14.468 km) business route of US 278 that is entirely within the city limits of Hilton Head Island. It travels along William Hilton Parkway, which connects to the Hilton Head Airport and various resorts on the island.

It was established in 1998 when the Cross Island Parkway was completed and US 278 was rerouted onto it.
