= Glascock County School District =

School district in Georgia (U.S. state)

Address
- 738 Railroad Avenue Gibson, Georgia, 30810-4063; United States
- Coordinates: 33.229025°N 82.589579°W

District information
- Grades: Pre-school - 12
- Superintendent: Jim Holton
- Accreditation(s): Southern Association of Colleges and Schools; Georgia Accrediting Commission

Students and staff
- Enrollment: 568
- Faculty: 42

Other information
- Telephone: (706) 598-2291
- Fax: (706) 598-2611
- Website: www.glascock.k12.ga.us

The Glascock County School District is a public school district in Glascock County, Georgia, United States, based in Gibson. It serves the communities of Edge Hill, Gibson, and Mitchell.

== Schools ==
The Glascock County School District has one consolidated school including pre-school to grade twelve.

=== Elementary-middle-high school ===
- Glascock County Consolidated School
