= Georgia State Route 123 =

State highway in Georgia, United States

State Route 123
- SR 123 highlighted in red

Route information
- Maintained by GDOT
- Length: 7.6 mi (12.2 km)

Major junctions
- South end: SR 102 in Mitchell
- North end: SR 16 east of Jewell

Location
- Country: United States
- State: Georgia
- Counties: Glascock, Warren

Highway system
- Georgia State Highway System; Interstate; US; State; Special
← US 123	→ SR 124

State Route 123 (SR 123) is a short 7.6-mile-long (12.2 km) state highway in the eastern part of the U.S. state of Georgia. It travels through portions of Glascock and Warren counties. Its routing is entirely northwest of Mitchell.

== Route description ==
SR 123 begins in at an intersection with SR 102 in Mitchell, within Glascock County. It heads northwest along local roads until it curves along the Glascock–Warren county line until branching north onto Shoals Road. SR 123 heads north along Shoals Road for a few miles before meeting its northern terminus, an intersection with SR 16.

== Major intersections ==
County	Location	mi	km	Destinations	Notes
Glascock	Mitchell	0.0	0.0	SR 102 (Main Street) – Sandersville, Wrens	Southern terminus
Warren		7.0	11.3	Jewell Road to SR 16 west – Jewell, Sparta	
Warren		7.6	12.2	SR 16 (Macon Highway) – Jewell, Sparta, Warrenton	Northern terminus
1.000 mi = 1.609 km; 1.000 km = 0.621 mi
