= Georgia State Route 296 =

Highway in Georgia, United States

State Route 296
- Georgia State Route 296 highlighted in red

Route information
- Maintained by GDOT
- Length: 16.4 mi (26.4 km)
- Existed: 1953–present

Major junctions
- South end: US 1 / US 221 / SR 4 / SR 17 north of Louisville
- SR 88 / SR 540 southwest of Wrens; SR 102 in Stapleton; SR 80 northwest of Wrens
- North end: SR 17 north-northwest of Wrens

Location
- Country: United States
- State: Georgia
- Counties: Jefferson, Glascock, Warren

Highway system
- Georgia State Highway System; Interstate; US; State; Special
← SR 295	→ SR 297

State Route 296 (SR 296) is a south–north state highway located in the east-central part of the U.S. state of Georgia. It functions like a western bypass of Wrens. The highway travels from US 1/US 221/SR 4/SR 17 north of Louisville to SR 17 northwest of Wrens.

SR 296 was formerly part of SR 16, which used to travel southeast of Warrenton. When SR 16 was shifted southward, it was redesignated as SR 16 Connector (SR 16 Conn.). The connector, which only existed for about a year, was redesignated as SR 296.

== Route description ==
SR 296 begins at an intersection with US 1/US 221/SR 4/SR 17 approximately 3.6 miles (5.8 km) north of Louisville, in Jefferson County. It heads northwest to an intersection with SR 88/SR 540 (Fall Line Freeway) approximately 3.9 miles (6.3 km) southwest of Wrens. Just before that intersection, the highway assumes more of a northerly routing to the town of Stapleton, where it intersects SR 102. After leaving Stapleton, SR 296 assumes a more northeasterly routing. After intersecting SR 80 approximately 3.9 miles (6.3 km) northwest of Wrens, the route leaves Jefferson County, briefly cutting across the extreme eastern corner of Glascock County. Shortly after entering Warren County, the route meets its northern terminus, an intersection with SR 17 approximately 4.9 miles (7.9 km) northwest of Wrens.

SR 296 mainly serves to connect US 1/US 221/SR 4 and SR 17 with the town of Stapleton. Largely a rural route, SR 296 sees an Average Annual Daily Traffic (AADT) of less than 2,000 vehicles.

== History ==
In 1952, the path of SR 16 southeast of Warrenton was shifted southward, replacing the path of SR 16S. The portion from northwest of Wrens to north of Louisville was redesignated as SR 16 Conn. The next year, the path of SR 16 Conn. was redesignated as SR 296.

== Major intersections ==
County	Location	mi	km	Destinations	Notes
Jefferson		0.0	0.0	US 1 / US 221 / SR 17 (SR 4)	Southern terminus
Jefferson		7.1	11.4	SR 540 (Fenns Bridge Road) – Sandersville, Wrens	
Jefferson	Stapleton	11.4	18.3	SR 102 (Main Street) – Gibson, Wrens	
Jefferson		13.9	22.4	SR 80 – Warrenton, Wrens	
Glascock	No major junctions				
Warren		16.4	26.4	SR 17 (Wrens Highway) – Wrens, Thomson	Northern terminus; roadway continues as Jennings Road.
1.000 mi = 1.609 km; 1.000 km = 0.621 mi
