= Stapleton, Georgia =

- City
- Location in Jefferson County and the state of Georgia
- Coordinates: 33°12′57″N 82°28′5″W
- Country: United States
- State: Georgia
- County: Jefferson

Area
  - Total: 1.75 sq mi (4.52 km^{2})
  - Land: 1.75 sq mi (4.52 km^{2})
  - Water: 0 sq mi (0.00 km^{2})
- Elevation: 440 ft (134 m)

Population (2020)
  - Total: 402
  - Density: 230.5/sq mi (89.01/km^{2})
- Time zone: UTC-5 (Eastern (EST))
  - Summer (DST): UTC-4 (EDT)
- ZIP code: 30823
- Area code: 706
- FIPS code: 13-73004
- GNIS feature ID: 0356555
- Website: https://cityofstapleton.com/

Stapleton is a city in Jefferson County, Georgia, United States. The population was 402 in 2020.

== History ==
An early variant name was "Spread". The Georgia General Assembly incorporated the place as the "Town of Spread" in 1903. Stapleton derives its current name from Colonel James Stapleton.

== Geography ==
Stapleton is located in northwestern Jefferson County at 33°12′57″N 82°28′5″W (33.215877, -82.468007). Georgia State Route 102 passes through the center of town as Main Street, leading east 4.5 miles (7.2 km) to Wrens and west 4 miles (6 km) to Avera. State Route 296 (Harvey Street and George Street) crosses SR-102 in the center of Stapleton, leading northeast 5 miles (8 km) to SR-17 in Warren County and south 16 miles (26 km) to Louisville, the Jefferson county seat.

According to the United States Census Bureau, Stapleton has a total area of 1.7 square miles (4.5 km^{2}), all land.

== Demographics ==
Historical population
Census	Pop.	Note	%±
1910	370		—
1920	410		10.8%
1930	432		5.4%
1940	342		−20.8%
1950	355		3.8%
1960	356		0.3%
1970	390		9.6%
1980	388		−0.5%
1990	330		−14.9%
2000	318		−3.6%
2010	438		37.7%
2020	402		−8.2%
U.S. Decennial Census

As of the census of 2000, there were 318 people, 110 households, and 80 families residing in the city. By 2020, its population was 402.

== See also ==
- Central Savannah River Area
