= Bastonville, Georgia =

Unincorporated community in Georgia, U.S.

Coordinates: 33°18′29″N 82°31′53″W

Bastonville is an unincorporated community in Glascock County, in the U.S. state of Georgia.

== History ==
A post office was established at Bastonville from 1890, and remained in operation until 1902. Nathan T. Baston, an early postmaster, gave the community his last name.
