= Agricola, Georgia =

Unincorporated community in Georgia, U.S.

Coordinates: 33°11′41″N 82°43′13″W

Agricola is an unincorporated community in Glascock County, in the U.S. state of Georgia. It is located along the crossroads of SR 102 and Hamburg-Agricola Road.

== History ==
A post office called Agricola was established in 1887, and remained in operation until 1950. In 1900, Agricola had 31 inhabitants.
