= Jefferson County, Georgia =

County in Georgia, United States

- County
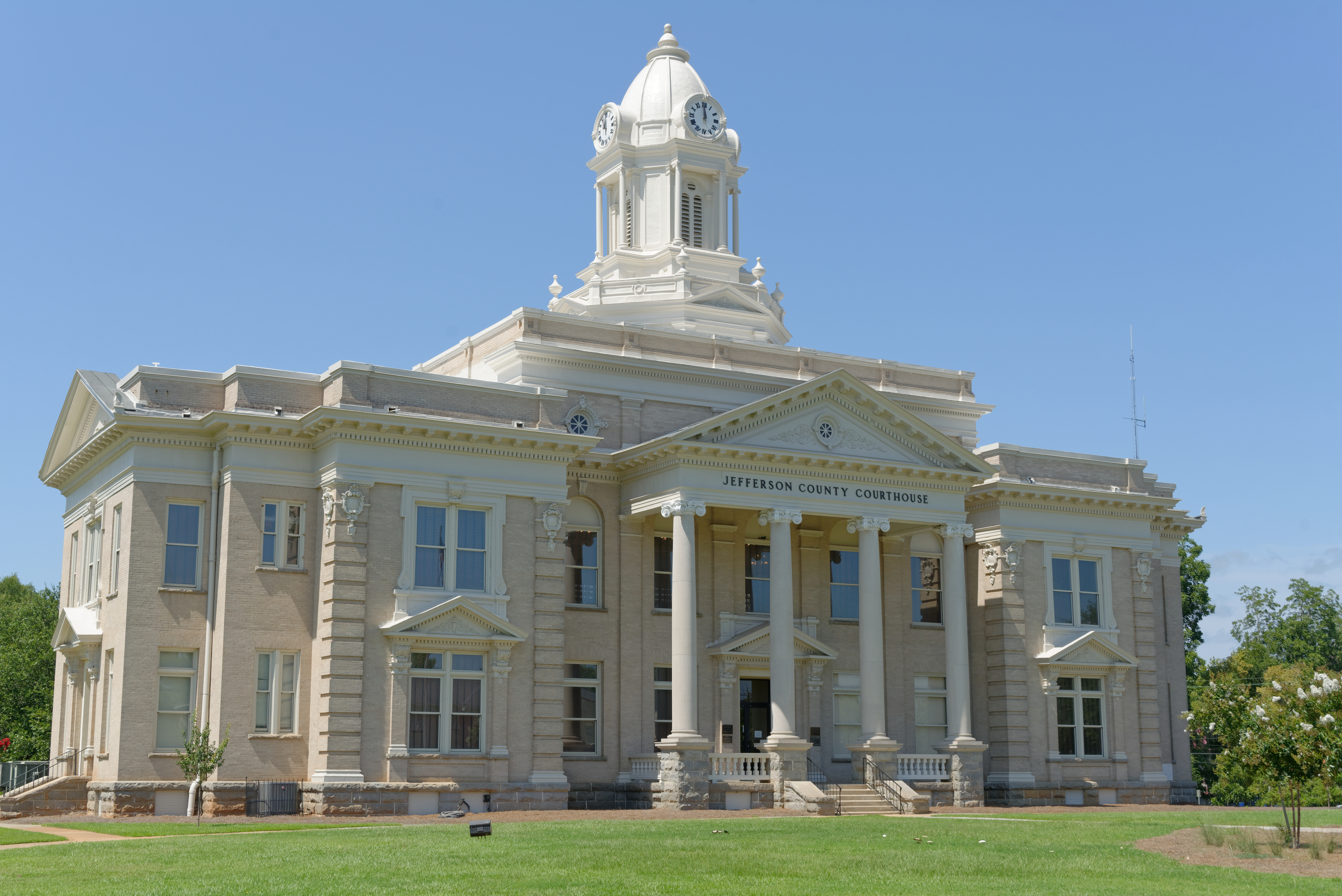
- County courthouse in Louisville

- Location within the U.S. state of Georgia
- Coordinates: 33°03′N 82°25′W
- Country: United States
- State: Georgia
- Founded: February 20, 1796; 230 years ago
- Named for: Thomas Jefferson
- Seat: Louisville
- Largest city: Louisville

Area
  - Total: 530 sq mi (1,400 km^{2})
  - Land: 526 sq mi (1,360 km^{2})
  - Water: 3.2 sq mi (8.3 km^{2}) 0.6%

Population (2020)
  - Total: 15,709
  - Estimate (2025): 15,011 ▼
  - Density: 29.9/sq mi (11.5/km^{2})
- Time zone: UTC−5 (Eastern)
  - Summer (DST): UTC−4 (EDT)
- Congressional district: 12th
- Website: Jefferson County, Georgia

Jefferson County is a county located in the U.S. state of Georgia. As of the 2020 census, the population was 15,709. The county seat and largest city is Louisville. The county was created on February 20, 1796, and named for Thomas Jefferson, the main author of the Declaration of Independence who became the third president of the United States.

== Geography ==
According to the U.S. Census Bureau, the county has a total area of 530 square miles (1,400 km^{2}), of which 526 square miles (1,360 km^{2}) is land and 3.2 square miles (8.3 km^{2}) (0.6%) is water.

The small northern portion of Jefferson County, defined by a line running from Stapleton southeast and just south of State Route 80, is located in the Brier Creek sub-basin of the Savannah River basin. The entire rest of the county is located in the Upper Ogeechee River sub-basin of the Ogeechee River basin.

=== Major highways ===
- US 1 / SR 4
  - US 1 Bus. / SR 4 Bus. (Wadley)
  - US 1 Bus. / SR 4 Bus. (Louisville)
- US 221
- US 319
- SR 17
- SR 24
- SR 47
- SR 78
- SR 80
- SR 88
- SR 102
- SR 171
- SR 242
- SR 296
- SR 540 (Fall Line Freeway)

=== Adjacent counties ===
- McDuffie County - north
- Richmond County - northeast
- Burke County - east
- Emanuel County - south
- Johnson County - southwest
- Glascock County - northwest
- Washington County - west
- Warren County - northwest

== Communities ==
=== Cities ===
- Avera
- Louisville (county seat)
- Stapleton
- Wadley
- Wrens

=== Towns ===
- Bartow

=== Census-designated place ===
- Matthews

== Demographics ==
Historical population
Census	Pop.	Note	%±
1800	5,684		—
1810	6,111		7.5%
1820	7,056		15.5%
1830	7,309		3.6%
1840	7,254		−0.8%
1850	9,131		25.9%
1860	10,219		11.9%
1870	12,190		19.3%
1880	15,671		28.6%
1890	17,213		9.8%
1900	18,212		5.8%
1910	21,379		17.4%
1920	22,602		5.7%
1930	20,727		−8.3%
1940	20,040		−3.3%
1950	18,855		−5.9%
1960	17,468		−7.4%
1970	17,174		−1.7%
1980	18,403		7.2%
1990	17,408		−5.4%
2000	17,266		−0.8%
2010	16,930		−1.9%
2020	15,709		−7.2%
2025 (est.)	15,011	▼	−4.4%
U.S. Decennial Census; 1790-1880 1890-1910; 1920-1930 1930-1940; 1940-1950 1960-1980; 1980-2000 2010 2020

=== Racial and ethnic composition ===
Jefferson County, Georgia – Racial and ethnic composition Note: the US Census treats Hispanic/Latino as an ethnic category. This table excludes Latinos from the racial categories and assigns them to a separate category. Hispanics/Latinos may be of any race.
Race / Ethnicity (NH = Non-Hispanic)	Pop 1980	Pop 1990	Pop 2000	Pop 2010	Pop 2020	% 1980	% 1990	% 2000	% 2010	% 2020
White alone (NH)	8,245	7,647	7,215	7,015	6,834	44.80%	43.93%	41.79%	41.44%	43.50%
Black or African American alone (NH)	9,852	9,688	9,663	9,187	7,970	53.53%	55.65%	55.97%	54.26%	50.74%
Native American or Alaska Native alone (NH)	11	14	21	18	21	0.06%	0.08%	0.12%	0.11%	0.13%
Asian alone (NH)	23	16	27	64	70	0.12%	0.09%	0.16%	0.38%	0.45%
Native Hawaiian or Pacific Islander alone (NH)	x	x	1	2	0	x	x	0.01%	0.01%	0.00%
Other race alone (NH)	4	2	16	13	25	0.02%	0.01%	0.09%	0.08%	0.16%
Mixed race or Multiracial (NH)	x	x	64	114	327	x	x	0.37%	0.67%	2.08%
Hispanic or Latino (any race)	268	41	259	517	462	1.46%	0.24%	1.50%	3.05%	2.94%
Total	18,403	17,408	17,266	16,930	15,709	100.00%	100.00%	100.00%	100.00%	100.00%

=== 2020 census ===
As of the 2020 census, the county had a population of 15,709. The median age was 43.4 years. 21.7% of residents were under the age of 18 and 20.6% of residents were 65 years of age or older. For every 100 females there were 93.6 males, and for every 100 females age 18 and over there were 90.1 males age 18 and over. 0.0% of residents lived in urban areas, while 100.0% lived in rural areas.

The racial makeup of the county was 44.2% White, 50.8% Black or African American, 0.3% American Indian and Alaska Native, 0.4% Asian, 0.0% Native Hawaiian and Pacific Islander, 1.7% from some other race, and 2.6% from two or more races. Hispanic or Latino residents of any race comprised 2.9% of the population.

There were 6,170 households, including 3,598 families, in the county, of which 30.6% had children under the age of 18 living with them and 36.8% had a female householder with no spouse or partner present. About 29.1% of all households were made up of individuals and 14.6% had someone living alone who was 65 years of age or older.

There were 7,148 housing units, of which 13.7% were vacant. Among occupied housing units, 66.9% were owner-occupied and 33.1% were renter-occupied. The homeowner vacancy rate was 1.1% and the rental vacancy rate was 4.0%.

== Education ==
There is one school district in the county: Jefferson County School District, which has its boundaries paralleling that of the county.

== Politics ==
The county has been depopulating since 1980, and the Democratic Party vote share has fluctuated since then. Jefferson County leans Democratic in presidential elections; it voted for Democrats in every presidential election from 1992 to 2020. In 2024, Donald Trump became the first Republican since George H. W. Bush in 1988 to carry the county. It is now a Democratic-leaning swing county.

For elections to the United States House of Representatives, Jefferson County is part of Georgia's 12th congressional district, currently represented by Rick Allen. For elections to the Georgia State Senate, Jefferson County is part of District 23. For elections to the Georgia House of Representatives, Jefferson County is part of District 132.

United States presidential election results for Jefferson County, Georgia
Year	Republican		Democratic		Third party(ies)	
Year	No.	%	No.	%	No.	%
1912	45	3.31%	899	66.15%	415	30.54%
1916	63	7.91%	588	73.87%	145	18.22%
1920	82	8.92%	837	91.08%	0	0.00%
1924	103	15.10%	502	73.61%	77	11.29%
1928	1,057	56.98%	798	43.02%	0	0.00%
1932	65	4.23%	1,454	94.66%	17	1.11%
1936	168	11.85%	1,238	87.31%	12	0.85%
1940	171	13.72%	1,068	85.71%	7	0.56%
1944	274	20.80%	1,043	79.20%	0	0.00%
1948	137	7.98%	544	31.70%	1,035	60.31%
1952	744	33.51%	1,476	66.49%	0	0.00%
1956	512	27.48%	1,351	72.52%	0	0.00%
1960	986	43.71%	1,270	56.29%	0	0.00%
1964	2,950	70.15%	1,253	29.80%	2	0.05%
1968	1,227	23.51%	1,901	36.43%	2,090	40.05%
1972	2,777	70.11%	1,184	29.89%	0	0.00%
1976	1,309	29.59%	3,115	70.41%	0	0.00%
1980	1,605	32.24%	3,305	66.39%	68	1.37%
1984	2,999	51.57%	2,816	48.43%	0	0.00%
1988	2,788	54.13%	2,346	45.54%	17	0.33%
1992	2,077	34.68%	3,220	53.77%	692	11.55%
1996	2,077	35.86%	3,404	58.77%	311	5.37%
2000	2,559	45.98%	2,973	53.41%	34	0.61%
2004	3,066	46.89%	3,447	52.71%	26	0.40%
2008	3,061	42.31%	4,149	57.35%	25	0.35%
2012	2,999	41.08%	4,261	58.36%	41	0.56%
2016	3,063	43.91%	3,821	54.77%	92	1.32%
2020	3,537	46.30%	4,058	53.12%	44	0.58%
2024	3,765	50.45%	3,674	49.23%	24	0.32%

United States Senate election results for Jefferson County, Georgia2
Year	Republican		Democratic		Third party(ies)	
Year	No.	%	No.	%	No.	%
2020	3,539	46.85%	3,913	51.80%	102	1.35%
2020	3,174	45.83%	3,752	54.17%	0	0.00%

United States Senate election results for Jefferson County, Georgia3
Year	Republican		Democratic		Third party(ies)	
Year	No.	%	No.	%	No.	%
2020	1,847	24.75%	2,487	33.33%	3,128	41.92%
2020	3,159	45.61%	3,767	54.39%	0	0.00%
2022	3,041	48.63%	3,158	50.50%	54	0.86%
2022	2,896	48.47%	3,079	51.53%	0	0.00%

Georgia Gubernatorial election results for Jefferson County
Year	Republican		Democratic		Third party(ies)	
Year	No.	%	No.	%	No.	%
2022	3,162	50.37%	3,089	49.20%	27	0.43%

== See also ==
- Central Savannah River Area
- National Register of Historic Places listings in Jefferson County, Georgia
- List of counties in Georgia
