= Mitchell, Georgia =

- Town
- Location in Glascock County and the state of Georgia
- Coordinates: 33°13′21″N 82°42′1″W
- Country: United States
- State: Georgia
- County: Glascock

Area
  - Total: 1.49 sq mi (3.85 km^{2})
  - Land: 1.48 sq mi (3.83 km^{2})
  - Water: 0.0077 sq mi (0.02 km^{2})
- Elevation: 535 ft (163 m)

Population (2020)
  - Total: 153
  - Density: 103.5/sq mi (39.96/km^{2})
- Time zone: UTC-5 (Eastern (EST))
  - Summer (DST): UTC-4 (EDT)
- ZIP code: 30820
- Area code: 706
- FIPS code: 13-51968
- GNIS feature ID: 0318336
- Website: mitchellgeorgia.com

Mitchell is a town in Glascock County, Georgia, United States. The population was 199 at the 2010 census, and 153 in 2020. Mitchell is home to the Mitchell Depot Historical Museum.

== History ==
Mitchell had its start in the 1880s, when the railroad was extended to that point. The community was named after R. M. Mitchell, a railroad official.

The Georgia General Assembly incorporated Mitchell as a town in 1896.

The town was profiled in an article in The Los Angeles Times in 1978, with a reporter describing it as "a town that harks back to a simpler, more innocent America of a century ago," and noting that "The folks who live here in east-central Georgia's picturesque countryside know one another so well tha the wife of the former mayor called the community 'one big security blanket'

== Geography ==
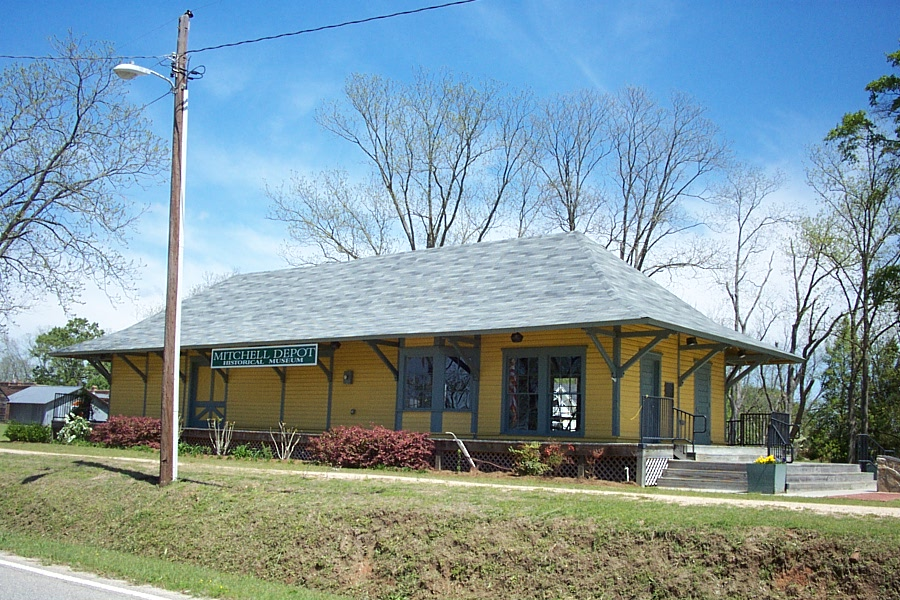
Mitchell's former railroad depot, now the Mitchell Depot Historical Museum, is located along Georgia Highway 102 in downtown Mitchell.

Mitchell is located in western Glascock County at the intersection of State Routes 102 and 123. SR 102 leads east 6 miles (10 km) to Gibson, the Glascock County seat, and southwest 19 miles (31 km) to Sandersville, while SR 123 leads northwest 18 miles (29 km) to Sparta.

According to the United States Census Bureau, the town of Mitchell has a total area of 1.5 square miles (3.8 km^{2}), of which 0.01 square miles (0.02 km^{2}), or 0.42%, is water. It is located 2 miles (3 km) east of the Ogeechee River.

== Demographics ==
Historical population
Census	Pop.	Note	%±
1900	246		—
1910	212		−13.8%
1920	257		21.2%
1930	237		−7.8%
1940	228		−3.8%
1950	240		5.3%
1960	184		−23.3%
1970	187		1.6%
1980	214		14.4%
1990	181		−15.4%
2000	173		−4.4%
2010	199		15.0%
2020	153		−23.1%
U.S. Decennial Census

As of the census of 2000, there were 173 people, 72 households, and 51 families residing in the town. The population density was 119.2 inhabitants per square mile (46.0/km^{2}). There were 77 housing units at an average density of 53.0 units per square mile (20.5 units/km^{2}). The racial makeup of the town was 83.82% White and 16.18% African American. By 2020, its population declined to 153.

== See also ==
- Central Savannah River Area
