= Hamburg State Park =

State park in Georgia, US

- Location within Georgia Location within the United States
- Location: Washington County, Georgia
- Nearest city: Jewell, Georgia
- Coordinates: 33°12′21″N 82°46′42″W
- Area: 741 acres (1.158 sq mi)
- Governing body: Georgia State Park

Hamburg State Park is a 741 acre (3.00 km^{2}) state park located near Jewell and Warthen in the U.S. state of Georgia. It is home to a 1921 water-powered grist mill still operating today, and a museum with antique agricultural tools and appliances used in rural Georgia. The park's location on the 225 acre (0.91 km^{2}) Hamburg Lake makes it a great place for fishing.

The state park took its name from the former industrial town of Hamburg, South Carolina.

== Facilities ==
- 30 Tent/Trailer/RV Campsites
- 1 Group Shelter
- 1 Picnic Shelter
- Nature Trail

== Images ==
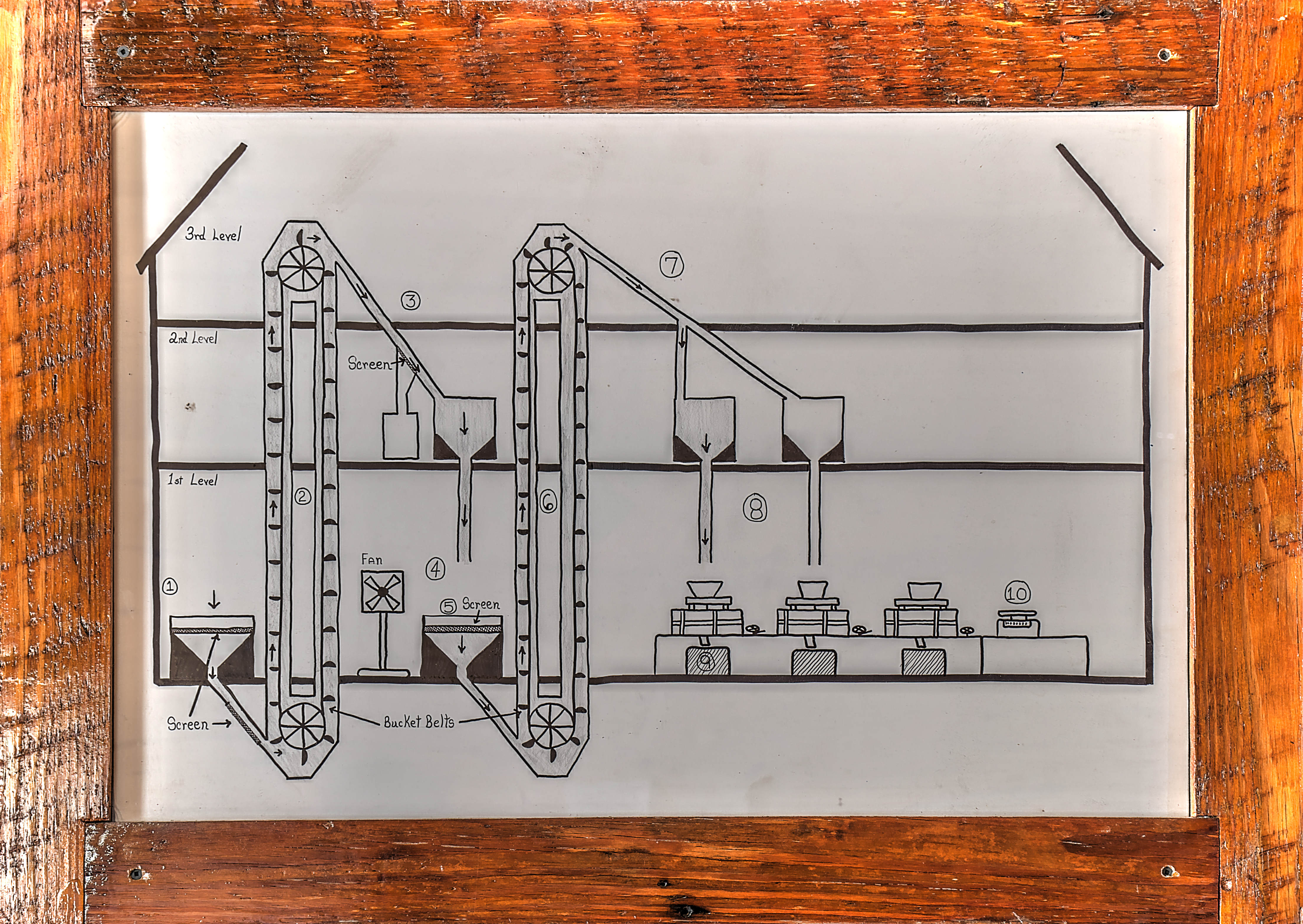
schematic of mill

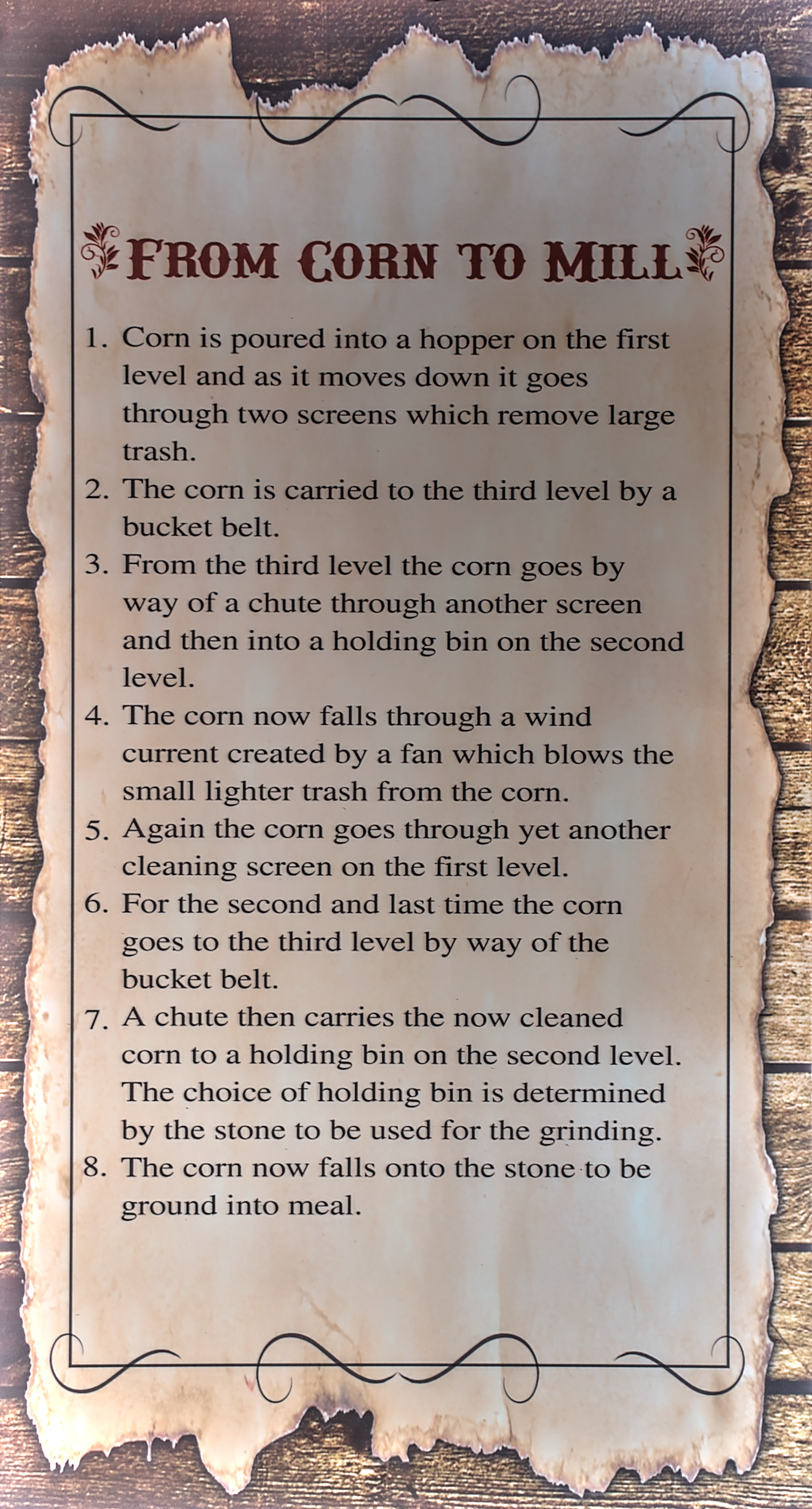
informational sign
