= Warren County, Georgia =

County in Georgia, United States

- County
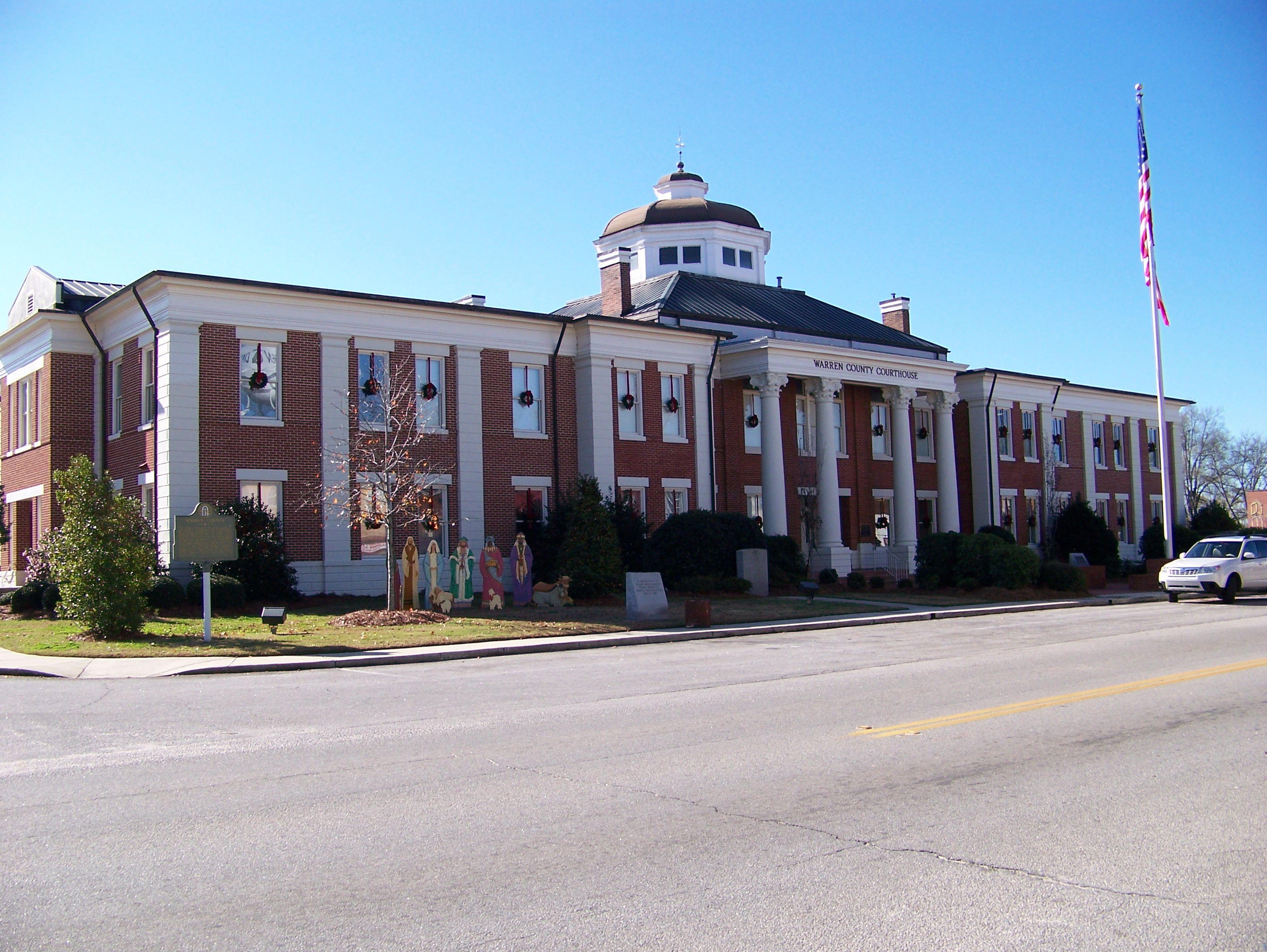
- Warren County courthouse in Warrenton

- Location within the U.S. state of Georgia
- Coordinates: 33°25′N 82°41′W
- Country: United States
- State: Georgia
- Founded: December 19, 1793; 232 years ago
- Named for: Joseph Warren
- Seat: Warrenton
- Largest city: Warrenton

Area
  - Total: 287 sq mi (740 km^{2})
  - Land: 284 sq mi (740 km^{2})
  - Water: 2.4 sq mi (6.2 km^{2}) 0.8%

Population (2020)
  - Total: 5,215
  - Estimate (2025): 5,269 ▲
  - Density: 21/sq mi (8.1/km^{2})
- Time zone: UTC−5 (Eastern)
  - Summer (DST): UTC−4 (EDT)
- Congressional district: 12th
- Website: www.warrencountyga.com

Warren County is a county located in the Eastern Piedmont region of the U.S. state of Georgia. As of the 2020 United States census, the population was 5,215, a decrease from 2010. The county seat is Warrenton. The county was created on December 19, 1793, and is named after General Joseph Warren, who was killed in the Battle of Bunker Hill.

== Geography ==
According to the U.S. Census Bureau, the county has a total area of 287 square miles (740 km^{2}), of which 284 square miles (740 km^{2}) is land and 2.4 square miles (6.2 km^{2}) (0.8%) is water.

The north-to-northeastern quarter of Warren County, north of a line between the county's northwestern corner, Norwood, and Camak, is located in the Little River sub-basin of the Savannah River basin. The southeastern quarter, from Camak in the north, and bordered by a northwest-to-southeast line running through Warrenton, is located in the Brier Creek sub-basin of the larger Savannah River basin. The western half of the county, west of Warrenton, is located in the Upper Ogeechee River sub-basin of the Ogeechee River basin.

=== Major highways ===
- I-20 / SR 402 – SR 402 is the unsigned designation for I-20
- US 278 / SR 12
  - US 278 Byp. / SR 12 Byp. (Warrenton)
- SR 16
- SR 17
  - SR 17 Conn.
- SR 80
  - SR 80 Alt. (Warrenton)
- SR 123
- SR 171
- SR 296

=== Adjacent counties ===
- Wilkes County (north)
- McDuffie County (east)
- Glascock County (south)
- Jefferson County (southeast)
- Hancock County (southwest)
- Taliaferro County (northwest)

== Communities ==
=== Cities ===
- Norwood
- Warrenton (county seat)

=== Towns ===
- Camak

=== Unincorporated communities ===
- Cadley
- Jewell
- Mesena

== Demographics ==
Historical population
Census	Pop.	Note	%±
1800	8,329		—
1810	8,725		4.8%
1820	10,630		21.8%
1830	10,946		3.0%
1840	9,789		−10.6%
1850	12,425		26.9%
1860	9,820		−21.0%
1870	10,545		7.4%
1880	10,885		3.2%
1890	10,957		0.7%
1900	11,463		4.6%
1910	11,860		3.5%
1920	11,828		−0.3%
1930	11,181		−5.5%
1940	10,236		−8.5%
1950	8,779		−14.2%
1960	7,360		−16.2%
1970	6,669		−9.4%
1980	6,583		−1.3%
1990	6,078		−7.7%
2000	6,336		4.2%
2010	5,834		−7.9%
2020	5,215		−10.6%
2025 (est.)	5,269	▲	1.0%
U.S. Decennial Census; 1790-1880 1890-1910; 1920-1930 1930-1940; 1940-1950 1960-1980; 1980-2000 2010

=== Racial and ethnic composition ===
Warren County, Georgia – Racial and ethnic composition Note: the US Census treats Hispanic/Latino as an ethnic category. This table excludes Latinos from the racial categories and assigns them to a separate category. Hispanics/Latinos may be of any race.
Race / Ethnicity (NH = Non-Hispanic)	Pop 1980	Pop 1990	Pop 2000	Pop 2010	Pop 2020	% 1980	% 1990	% 2000	% 2010	% 2020
White alone (NH)	2,635	2,411	2,483	2,133	1,974	40.03%	39.67%	39.19%	36.56%	37.85%
Black or African American alone (NH)	3,829	3,656	3,755	3,584	3,047	58.16%	60.15%	59.26%	61.43%	58.43%
Native American or Alaska Native alone (NH)	5	2	11	9	18	0.08%	0.03%	0.17%	0.15%	0.35%
Asian alone (NH)	3	7	8	21	15	0.05%	0.12%	0.13%	0.36%	0.29%
Native Hawaiian or Pacific Islander alone (NH)	x	x	0	0	1	x	x	0.00%	0.00%	0.02%
Other race alone (NH)	8	0	0	2	10	0.12%	0.00%	0.00%	0.03%	0.19%
Mixed race or Multiracial (NH)	x	x	28	31	97	x	x	0.44%	0.53%	1.86%
Hispanic or Latino (any race)	103	2	51	54	53	1.56%	0.03%	0.80%	0.93%	1.02%
Total	6,583	6,078	6,336	5,834	5,215	100.00%	100.00%	100.00%	100.00%	100.00%

=== 2020 census ===
As of the 2020 census, the county had a population of 5,215, 2,159 households, and 1,456 families residing there. The median age was 47.7 years, with 20.2% of residents under the age of 18 and 22.8% aged 65 years or older, and for every 100 females there were 89.2 males (86.7 males per 100 females age 18 and over).

0.0% of residents lived in urban areas, while 100.0% lived in rural areas.

The racial makeup of the county was 38.2% White, 58.5% Black or African American, 0.3% American Indian and Alaska Native, 0.3% Asian, 0.1% Native Hawaiian and Pacific Islander, 0.3% from some other race, and 2.3% from two or more races. Hispanic or Latino residents of any race comprised 1.0% of the population.

Of those households, 27.4% had children under the age of 18 living with them and 36.5% had a female householder with no spouse or partner present. About 31.5% of all households were made up of individuals and 15.6% had someone living alone who was 65 years of age or older.

There were 2,511 housing units, of which 14.0% were vacant. Among occupied housing units, 71.2% were owner-occupied and 28.8% were renter-occupied. The homeowner vacancy rate was 1.6% and the rental vacancy rate was 5.6%.

== Politics ==
As a part of America's Black Belt, a majority-Black, rural region, Warren County is a reliably Democratic county. Even as the rest of Georgia's demographics have rapidly shifted, Warren County and its surrounding counties have provided a consistent source of support for Democrats for years and frequently are the deciding factors in close elections, as metro Atlanta is usually overwhelmed by Georgia's deeply conservative rural areas. Despite this, Warren County's margins have narrowed in recent years, with Republicans slowly making gains due to the economic challenges that rural Georgia faces. In 2024, Warren County gave Donald Trump the Republican Party's best margin since 1972 due to the Republican Party's active targeting of African-American men and rural voters. However, Warren County remained reliably Democratic.

For elections to the United States House of Representatives, Warren County is part of Georgia's 12th congressional district, currently represented by Rick Allen. For elections to the Georgia State Senate, Warren County is part of District 23. For elections to the Georgia House of Representatives, Warren County is part of District 128.

United States presidential election results for Warren County, Georgia
Year	Republican		Democratic		Third party(ies)	
Year	No.	%	No.	%	No.	%
1912	67	19.48%	266	77.33%	11	3.20%
1916	89	20.79%	292	68.22%	47	10.98%
1920	83	17.11%	402	82.89%	0	0.00%
1924	36	9.30%	253	65.37%	98	25.32%
1928	255	50.80%	247	49.20%	0	0.00%
1932	18	2.58%	676	96.99%	3	0.43%
1936	129	18.91%	545	79.91%	8	1.17%
1940	95	13.51%	606	86.20%	2	0.28%
1944	152	25.21%	449	74.46%	2	0.33%
1948	33	4.05%	256	31.45%	525	64.50%
1952	374	35.05%	693	64.95%	0	0.00%
1956	152	18.40%	674	81.60%	0	0.00%
1960	375	44.33%	471	55.67%	0	0.00%
1964	1,070	73.59%	384	26.41%	0	0.00%
1968	406	23.13%	582	33.16%	767	43.70%
1972	1,175	71.21%	475	28.79%	0	0.00%
1976	720	35.04%	1,335	64.96%	0	0.00%
1980	779	33.56%	1,517	65.36%	25	1.08%
1984	1,087	46.35%	1,258	53.65%	0	0.00%
1988	897	44.78%	1,091	54.47%	15	0.75%
1992	751	34.53%	1,239	56.97%	185	8.51%
1996	735	35.82%	1,230	59.94%	87	4.24%
2000	933	43.50%	1,196	55.76%	16	0.75%
2004	1,121	45.04%	1,360	54.64%	8	0.32%
2008	1,087	40.83%	1,554	58.38%	21	0.79%
2012	990	39.18%	1,529	60.51%	8	0.32%
2016	991	42.46%	1,314	56.30%	29	1.24%
2020	1,166	44.00%	1,468	55.40%	16	0.60%
2024	1,232	47.53%	1,354	52.24%	6	0.23%

United States Senate election results for Warren County, Georgia2
Year	Republican		Democratic		Third party(ies)	
Year	No.	%	No.	%	No.	%
2020	1,161	44.41%	1,407	53.83%	46	1.76%
2020	1,079	43.76%	1,387	56.24%	0	0.00%

United States Senate election results for Warren County, Georgia3
Year	Republican		Democratic		Third party(ies)	
Year	No.	%	No.	%	No.	%
2020	631	24.41%	817	31.61%	1,137	43.98%
2020	1,166	44.25%	1,469	55.75%	0	0.00%
2022	1,007	46.86%	1,117	51.98%	25	1.16%
2022	959	47.43%	1,063	52.57%	0	0.00%

Georgia Gubernatorial election results for Warren County
Year	Republican		Democratic		Third party(ies)	
Year	No.	%	No.	%	No.	%
2022	1,063	49.28%	1,081	50.12%	13	0.60%

== Education ==
Public education is provided by the Warren County School District.

== See also ==
- Central Savannah River Area
- National Register of Historic Places listings in Warren County, Georgia
- List of counties in Georgia
