= Glascock County, Georgia =

County in Georgia, United States

- County
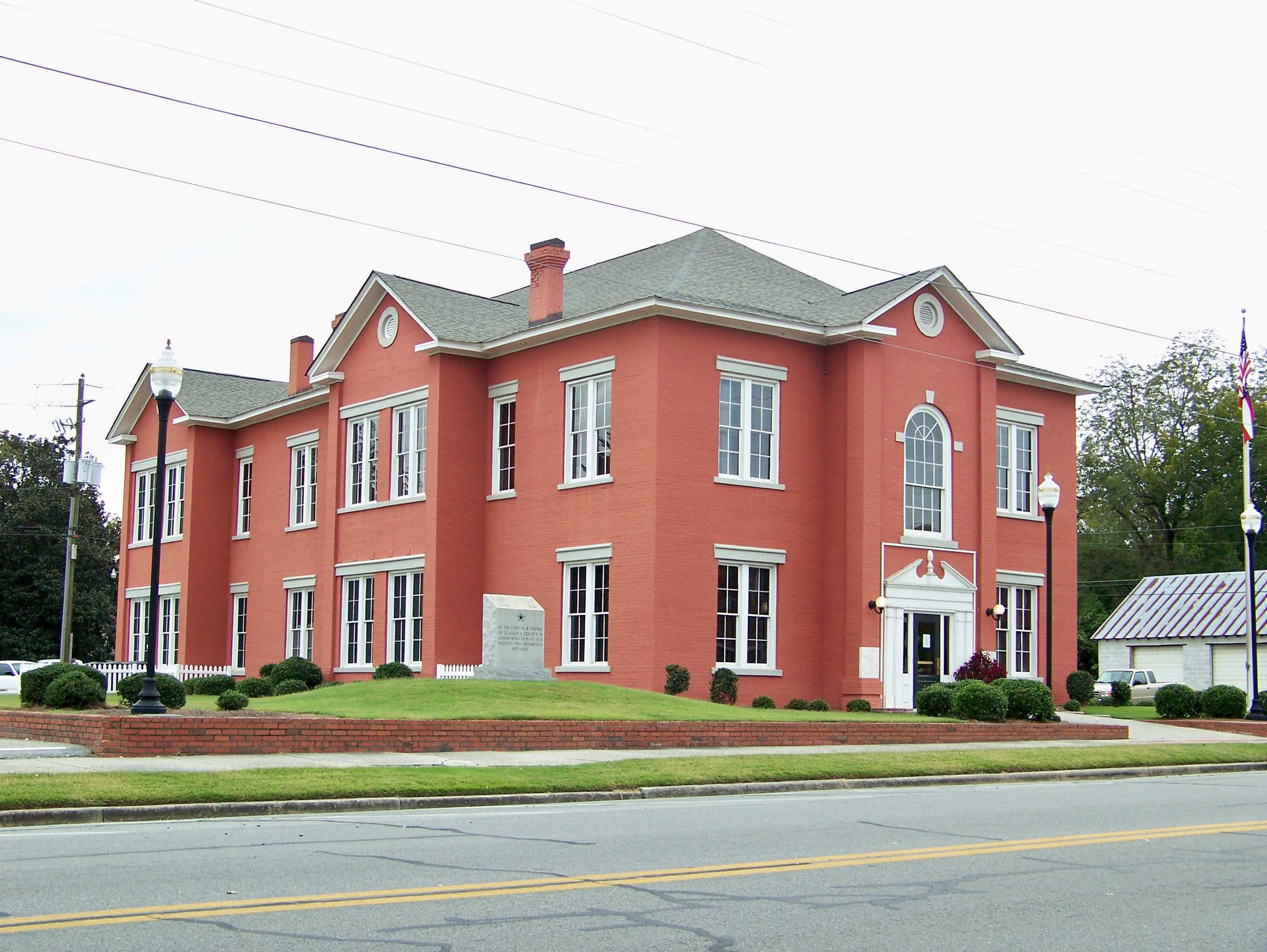
- Glascock County Courthouse in Gibson

- Seal

- Location within the U.S. state of Georgia
- Coordinates: 33°14′N 82°37′W
- Country: United States
- State: Georgia
- Founded: 1857; 169 years ago
- Named for: Thomas Glascock
- Seat: Gibson
- Largest city: Gibson

Area
  - Total: 144 sq mi (370 km^{2})
  - Land: 144 sq mi (370 km^{2})
  - Water: 0.7 sq mi (1.8 km^{2}) 0.5%

Population (2020)
  - Total: 2,884
  - Estimate (2025): 3,141 ▲
  - Density: 20/sq mi (7.7/km^{2})
- Time zone: UTC−5 (Eastern)
  - Summer (DST): UTC−4 (EDT)
- Congressional district: 12th
- Website: glascockcountyga.com

Glascock County is a county located in the U.S. state of Georgia. As of the 2020 census, the population was 2,884, making it the fourth-least populous county in Georgia. The county seat is Gibson. The county was created on December 19, 1857.

== History ==
The county is named after Thomas Glascock, a soldier in the War of 1812, general in the First Seminole War and U.S. representative.

== Geography ==
According to the U.S. Census Bureau, the county has a total area of 144 square miles (370 km^{2}), of which 144 square miles (370 km^{2}) is land and 0.7 square miles (1.8 km^{2}) (0.5%) is water. It is the fourth-smallest county in Georgia by area, behind Clayton, Rockdale, and Clarke counties.

The vast majority of Glascock County is located in the Upper Ogeechee River sub-basin of the Ogeechee River basin, with just the very northeastern corner of the county, northeast of State Route 80, located in the Brier Creek sub-basin of the Savannah River basin.

=== Major highways ===
- State Route 80
- State Route 102
- State Route 123
- State Route 171
- State Route 296

=== Adjacent counties ===
- Warren County - north
- Jefferson County - southeast
- Hancock County - northwest
- Washington County - southwest

== Communities ==
=== Cities ===
- Edge Hill
- Gibson (county seat)

=== Town ===
- Mitchell

=== Unincorporated communities ===
- Agricola
- Bastonville

== Demographics ==
Historical population
Census	Pop.	Note	%±
1860	2,437		—
1870	2,736		12.3%
1880	3,577		30.7%
1890	3,720		4.0%
1900	4,516		21.4%
1910	4,669		3.4%
1920	4,192		−10.2%
1930	4,388		4.7%
1940	4,547		3.6%
1950	3,579		−21.3%
1960	2,672		−25.3%
1970	2,280		−14.7%
1980	2,382		4.5%
1990	2,357		−1.0%
2000	2,556		8.4%
2010	3,082		20.6%
2020	2,884		−6.4%
2025 (est.)	3,141	▲	8.9%
U.S. Decennial Census; 1790-1880 1890-1910; 1920-1930 1930-1940; 1940-1950 1960-1980; 1980-2000 2010

=== Racial and ethnic composition ===
Glascock County, Georgia – Racial and ethnic composition Note: the US Census treats Hispanic/Latino as an ethnic category. This table excludes Latinos from the racial categories and assigns them to a separate category. Hispanics/Latinos may be of any race.
Race / Ethnicity (NH = Non-Hispanic)	Pop 1980	Pop 1990	Pop 2000	Pop 2010	Pop 2020	% 1980	% 1990	% 2000	% 2010	% 2020
White alone (NH)	1,962	2,052	2,309	2,750	2,573	82.37%	87.06%	90.34%	89.23%	89.22%
Black or African American alone (NH)	368	297	212	251	196	15.45%	12.60%	8.29%	8.14%	6.80%
Native American or Alaska Native alone (NH)	2	2	6	7	0	0.08%	0.08%	0.23%	0.23%	0.00%
Asian alone (NH)	0	0	0	1	7	0.00%	0.00%	0.00%	0.03%	0.24%
Native Hawaiian or Pacific Islander alone (NH)	x	x	0	0	2	x	x	0.00%	0.00%	0.07%
Other race alone (NH)	0	0	0	5	0	0.00%	0.00%	0.00%	0.16%	0.00%
Mixed race or Multiracial (NH)	x	x	17	35	54	x	x	0.67%	1.14%	1.87%
Hispanic or Latino (any race)	50	6	12	33	52	2.10%	0.25%	0.47%	1.07%	1.80%
Total	2,382	2,357	2,556	3,082	2,884	100.00%	100.00%	100.00%	100.00%	100.00%

=== 2020 census ===
As of the 2020 census, there were 2,884 people and 726 families residing in the county, and the median age was 44.1 years. Residents under the age of 18 comprised 22.5% of the population, and 19.9% of residents were 65 years of age or older. For every 100 females there were 93.8 males, and for every 100 females age 18 and over, there were 90.3 males age 18 and over.

0.0% of residents lived in urban areas, while 100.0% lived in rural areas.

The racial makeup of the county was 89.8% White, 6.8% Black or African American, 0.0% American Indian and Alaska Native, 0.2% Asian, 0.1% Native Hawaiian and Pacific Islander, 0.1% from some other race, and 2.9% from two or more races. Hispanic or Latino residents of any race comprised 1.8% of the population.

The 1,151 households counted by the census included 32.2% with children under the age of 18 living with them and 28.9% with a female householder with no spouse or partner present; about 29.4% of all households were made up of individuals and 15.0% had someone living alone who was 65 years of age or older.

There were 1,403 housing units, of which 18.0% were vacant. Among occupied housing units, 73.5% were owner-occupied and 26.5% were renter-occupied, with a homeowner vacancy rate of 1.7% and a rental vacancy rate of 7.4%.

== Politics ==
Glascock County, a rural, sparsely populated, majority-white county, is arguably the most Republican of Georgia's 159 counties, and one of the most Republican counties in the United States, with over 90 percent of voters supporting Donald Trump in 2024. In addition, Republican percentages have been in the 80s since 2004, and the last Democrat to win the county was Georgian Jimmy Carter in 1980. This is despite it being surrounded by Democratic counties.

In the 1904 presidential election, Glascock County has the highest proportion, of any county in the nation, of citizens to vote for the Populist Party, with a total of 69.38%.

For elections to the United States House of Representatives, Glascock County is part of Georgia's 12th congressional district, currently represented by Rick Allen. For elections to the Georgia State Senate, Glascock County is part of District 23. For elections to the Georgia House of Representatives, Glascock County is part of District 128.

United States presidential election results for Glascock County, Georgia
Year	Republican		Democratic		Third party(ies)	
Year	No.	%	No.	%	No.	%
1912	3	1.63%	109	59.24%	72	39.13%
1916	8	2.76%	126	43.45%	156	53.79%
1920	83	26.35%	232	73.65%	0	0.00%
1924	26	12.68%	111	54.15%	68	33.17%
1928	225	64.66%	123	35.34%	0	0.00%
1932	7	1.75%	393	98.25%	0	0.00%
1936	68	15.45%	369	83.86%	3	0.68%
1940	76	18.54%	332	80.98%	2	0.49%
1944	161	33.61%	318	66.39%	0	0.00%
1948	13	2.58%	123	24.40%	368	73.02%
1952	233	37.95%	381	62.05%	0	0.00%
1956	110	25.94%	314	74.06%	0	0.00%
1960	180	37.58%	299	62.42%	0	0.00%
1964	836	86.19%	134	13.81%	0	0.00%
1968	185	19.17%	47	4.87%	733	75.96%
1972	578	93.38%	41	6.62%	0	0.00%
1976	371	34.51%	704	65.49%	0	0.00%
1980	510	44.82%	614	53.95%	14	1.23%
1984	827	72.29%	317	27.71%	0	0.00%
1988	580	73.42%	210	26.58%	0	0.00%
1992	516	50.94%	316	31.19%	181	17.87%
1996	532	52.78%	348	34.52%	128	12.70%
2000	763	74.80%	249	24.41%	8	0.78%
2004	1,016	80.00%	250	19.69%	4	0.31%
2008	1,202	84.17%	210	14.71%	16	1.12%
2012	1,135	84.96%	176	13.17%	25	1.87%
2016	1,235	88.85%	138	9.93%	17	1.22%
2020	1,402	89.58%	155	9.90%	8	0.51%
2024	1,534	91.86%	133	7.96%	3	0.18%

United States Senate election results for Glascock County, Georgia2
Year	Republican		Democratic		Third party(ies)	
Year	No.	%	No.	%	No.	%
2020	1,366	88.13%	150	9.68%	34	2.19%
2020	1,230	90.18%	134	9.82%	0	0.00%

United States Senate election results for Glascock County, Georgia3
Year	Republican		Democratic		Third party(ies)	
Year	No.	%	No.	%	No.	%
2020	819	54.60%	84	5.60%	597	39.80%
2020	1,234	90.47%	130	9.53%	0	0.00%
2022	1,171	90.42%	113	8.73%	11	0.85%
2022	1,118	91.41%	105	8.59%	0	0.00%

Georgia Gubernatorial election results for Glascock County
Year	Republican		Democratic		Third party(ies)	
Year	No.	%	No.	%	No.	%
2022	1,211	92.80%	89	6.82%	5	0.38%

== Education ==
Public education is provided by the Glascock County School District.

== See also ==
- Central Savannah River Area
- National Register of Historic Places listings in Glascock County, Georgia
- List of counties in Georgia
