= Edge Hill, Georgia =

City in Georgia, United States

- City
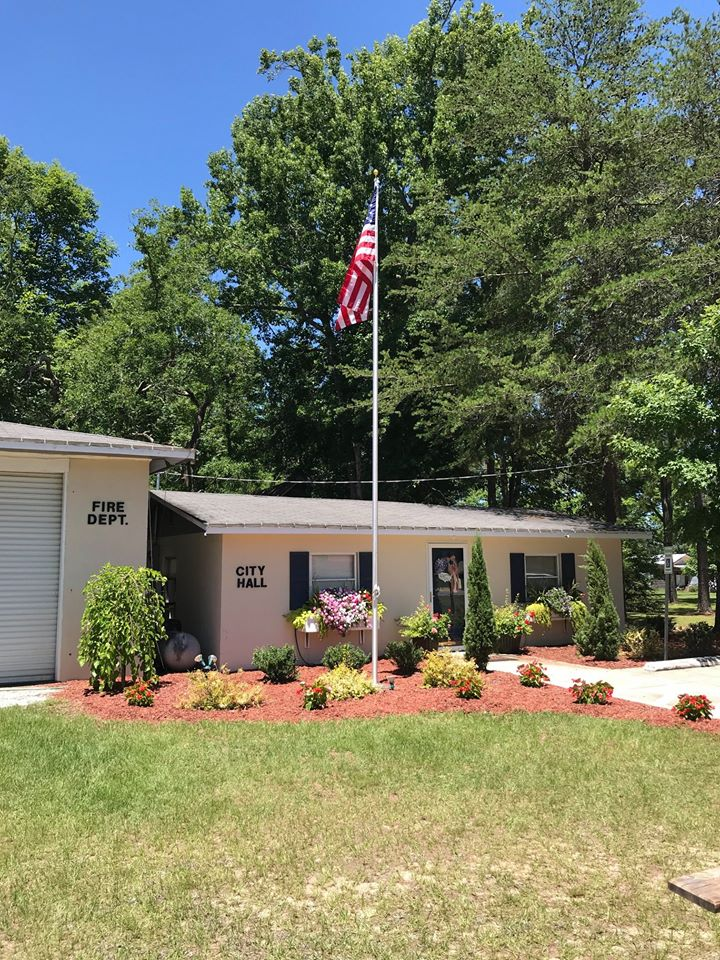
- The city hall and fire station for the City of Edge Hill, Georgia

- Logo

- Location in Glascock County and the state of Georgia
- Coordinates: 33°9′11″N 82°37′36″W
- Country: United States
- State: Georgia
- County: Glascock

Government
  - Mayor: Dewey Belcher
  - City Clerk: Angela Barrow
  - City Councilor: Gary Kitchens
  - City Councilor: Kristi Kitchens

Area
  - Total: 0.19 sq mi (0.48 km^{2})
  - Land: 0.19 sq mi (0.48 km^{2})
  - Water: 0 sq mi (0.00 km^{2})
- Elevation: 486 ft (148 m)

Population (2020)
  - Total: 22
  - Density: 119.1/sq mi (45.98/km^{2})
- Time zone: UTC-5 (Eastern (EST))
  - Summer (DST): UTC-4 (EDT)
- ZIP code: 30810
- Area code: 706
- FIPS code: 13-26224
- GNIS feature ID: 0355642

Edge Hill (stylized as Edgehill on some tourism material) is a city in Glascock County, Georgia, United States. The population was 22 at the 2020 census. It is the smallest incorporated city in Georgia by population and ties for the smallest incorporated city in Georgia by area.

== History ==
A post office called Edgehill was established in 1902, and closed in 1903. The Georgia General Assembly incorporated the place on January 1, 1939. The name "Edge Hill" is descriptive of the town site.

== Geography ==
Edge Hill is located at 33°9′11″N 82°37′36″W (33.153078, -82.626635).

According to the United States Census Bureau, the city has a total area of 0.2 square miles (0.52 km^{2}), all land, tying it with Santa Claus for being the smallest city in Georgia by land size.

== Demographics ==
Historical population
Census	Pop.	Note	%±
1960	55		—
1970	46		−16.4%
1980	53		15.2%
1990	22		−58.5%
2000	30		36.4%
2010	24		−20.0%
2020	22		−8.3%
U.S. Decennial Census

At the 2000 census there were 30 people, 11 households, and 9 families living in the city. The population density was 161.7 inhabitants per square mile (62.4/km^{2}). There were 16 housing units at an average density of 86.2 units per square mile (33.3 units/km^{2}). The racial makeup of the city was 96.67% White, and 3.33% from two or more races. Of the 11 households 45.5% had children under the age of 18 living with them, 90.9% were married couples living together, and 9.1% were non-families. 9.1% of households were one person and none had someone living alone who was 65 or older. The average household size was 2.73 and the average family size was 2.90.

The age distribution was 26.7% under the age of 18, 3.3% from 18 to 24, 23.3% from 25 to 44, 23.3% from 45 to 64, and 23.3% 65 or older. The median age was 44 years. For every 100 females, there were 114.3 males. For every 100 females age 18 and over, there were 83.3 males.

The median household income was $58,125 and the median family income was $59,375. Males had a median income of $29,375 versus $26,250 for females. The per capita income for the city was $19,409. There were 18.2% of families and 9.3% of the population living below the poverty line, including no under eighteens and 50.0% of those over 64. According to the 2010 Census, the population of the city was 24, all of which were White. None were Hispanic and Latino (of any race)

== See also ==
- Central Savannah River Area
