= Avera, Georgia =

- City
- Location in Jefferson County and the state of Georgia
- Coordinates: 33°11′42″N 82°31′39″W
- Country: United States
- State: Georgia
- County: Jefferson

Area
  - Total: 0.65 sq mi (1.68 km^{2})
  - Land: 0.65 sq mi (1.68 km^{2})
  - Water: 0 sq mi (0.00 km^{2})
- Elevation: 446 ft (136 m)

Population (2020)
  - Total: 223
  - Density: 343.1/sq mi (132.47/km^{2})
- Time zone: UTC-5 (Eastern (EST))
  - Summer (DST): UTC-4 (EDT)
- ZIP code: 30803
- Area code: 706
- FIPS code: 13-04448
- GNIS feature ID: 0331069

Avera is a city in Jefferson County, Georgia, United States. As of the 2020 census, the city had a population of 223. The city was incorporated in 1900.

== Geography ==
Avera is located at 33°11′42″N 82°31′39″W (33.194988, -82.527503). According to the United States Census Bureau, the city has a total area of 0.6 square miles (1.6 km^{2}), all land.

== Demographics ==
Historical population
Census	Pop.	Note	%±
1910	228		—
1920	258		13.2%
1930	258		0.0%
1940	298		15.5%
1950	230		−22.8%
1960	197		−14.3%
1970	217		10.2%
1980	248		14.3%
1990	215		−13.3%
2000	217		0.9%
2010	246		13.4%
2020	223		−9.3%
U.S. Decennial Census

At the 2000 census there were 217 people in 99 households, including 60 families, in the city. In 2020, its population was 223.

== See also ==
- Central Savannah River Area
