= Camak, Georgia =

- Town
- Location in Warren County and the state of Georgia
- Coordinates: 33°27′11″N 82°38′54″W
- Country: United States
- State: Georgia
- County: Warren

Area
  - Total: 0.80 sq mi (2.06 km^{2})
  - Land: 0.79 sq mi (2.05 km^{2})
  - Water: 0 sq mi (0.00 km^{2})
- Elevation: 581 ft (177 m)

Population (2020)
  - Total: 141
  - Density: 178.0/sq mi (68.71/km^{2})
- Time zone: UTC-5 (Eastern (EST))
  - Summer (DST): UTC-4 (EDT)
- ZIP code: 30807
- Area code: 706
- FIPS code: 13-12512
- GNIS feature ID: 0331311

Camak is a town in Warren County, Georgia, United States. The town is located just off Interstate 20 between Atlanta and Augusta. The population was 141 in 2020.

== History ==
The Georgia General Assembly incorporated the place in 1898 as the "Town of Camak", with municipal corporate limits extending in a one-half mile radius from the Georgia Railroad depot. The community was named after James Camak, a railroad promoter. Camak's home in Athens, the Camak House, is listed on the National Register of Historic Places.

== Geography ==
Camak is located at 33°27′11″N 82°38′54″W (33.453039, -82.648287). According to the United States Census Bureau, the town has a total area of 0.8 square miles (2.1 km^{2}), all land.

== Demographics ==
Historical population
Census	Pop.	Note	%±
1900	115		—
1910	241		109.6%
1920	303		25.7%
1930	345		13.9%
1940	360		4.3%
1950	379		5.3%
1960	285		−24.8%
1970	224		−21.4%
1980	283		26.3%
1990	220		−22.3%
2000	165		−25.0%
2010	138		−16.4%
2020	141		2.2%
U.S. Decennial Census

=== Racial and ethnic composition ===
Camak town, Georgia – Racial and ethnic composition Note: the US Census treats Hispanic/Latino as an ethnic category. This table excludes Latinos from the racial categories and assigns them to a separate category. Hispanics/Latinos may be of any race.
Race / Ethnicity (NH = Non-Hispanic)	Pop 2000	Pop 2010	Pop 2020	% 2000	% 2010	% 2020
White alone (NH)	76	65	60	46.06%	47.10%	42.55%
Black or African American alone (NH)	88	69	70	53.33%	50.00%	49.65%
Native American or Alaska Native alone (NH)	1	0	2	0.61%	0.00%	1.42%
Asian alone (NH)	0	0	3	0.00%	0.00%	2.13%
Native Hawaiian or Pacific Islander alone (NH)	0	0	0	0.00%	0.00%	0.00%
Other race alone (NH)	0	0	0	0.00%	0.00%	0.00%
Mixed race or Multiracial (NH)	0	2	2	0.00%	1.45%	1.42%
Hispanic or Latino (any race)	0	2	4	0.00%	1.45%	2.84%
Total	165	138	141	100.00%	100.00%	100.00%

== See also ==
- Central Savannah River Area
