= Warrenton, Georgia =

- City
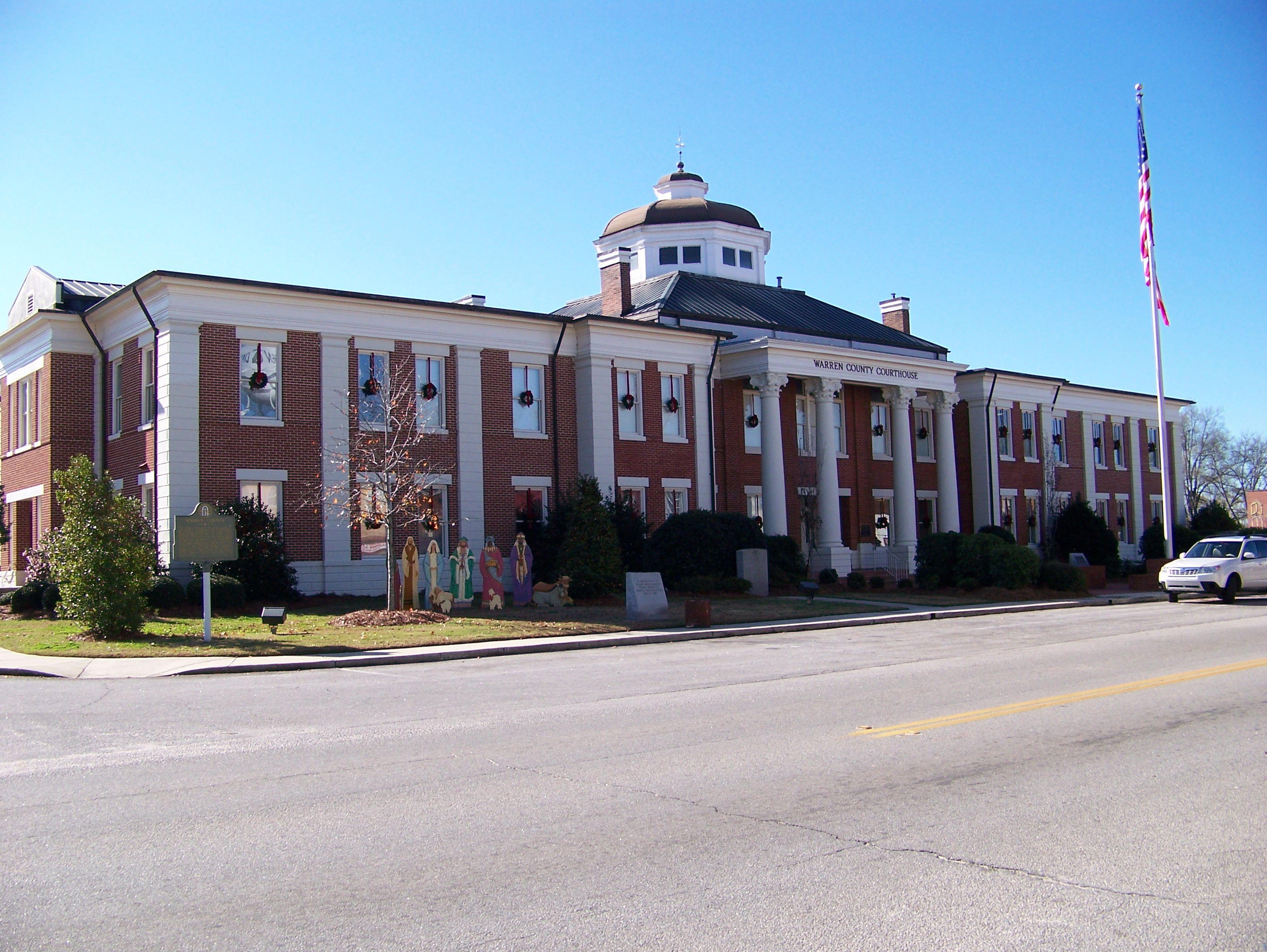
- Warren County Courthouse

- Location in Warren County and the state of Georgia
- Coordinates: 33°24′27″N 82°39′46″W
- Country: United States
- State: Georgia
- County: Warren

Area
  - Total: 1.92 sq mi (4.98 km^{2})
  - Land: 1.91 sq mi (4.94 km^{2})
  - Water: 0.015 sq mi (0.04 km^{2})
- Elevation: 518 ft (158 m)

Population (2020)
  - Total: 1,744
  - Density: 914.5/sq mi (353.09/km^{2})
- Time zone: UTC-5 (Eastern (EST))
  - Summer (DST): UTC-4 (EDT)
- ZIP code: 30828
- Area code: 706
- FIPS code: 13-80592
- GNIS feature ID: 0333368
- Website: www.warrentonga.gov

Warrenton is a city and the county seat of Warren County, Georgia, United States. The population was 1,744 in 2020.

== History ==
Warrenton was founded in 1797 as seat of Warren County (est. 1793). It was incorporated as a town in 1810 and as a city in 1908. The community was named for American Revolutionary War general Joseph Warren.

David Bushnell, an inventor who created the first submarine used in battle, settled in Warrenton after the war. He taught at the Warrenton Academy and died there in 1824.

On May 2, 1919, a crowd of three hundred white farmers shot to death and burned the corpse of a black farmer, Benny Richards, who was accused of murdering his own ex-wife.

== Geography ==
Warrenton is located at 33°24′27″N 82°39′46″W (33.407596, -82.662914). According to the United States Census Bureau, the city has a total area of 1.9 square miles (4.9 km^{2}), of which, 1.9 square miles (4.9 km^{2}) of it is land and 0.52% is water.

=== Climate ===
Climate data for Warrenton, Georgia, 1991–2020 normals, extremes 1914–2017
Month	Jan	Feb	Mar	Apr	May	Jun	Jul	Aug	Sep	Oct	Nov	Dec	Year
Record high °F (°C)	86 (30)	83 (28)	90 (32)	95 (35)	100 (38)	110 (43)	109 (43)	107 (42)	108 (42)	99 (37)	90 (32)	80 (27)	110 (43)
Mean maximum °F (°C)	71.1 (21.7)	75.3 (24.1)	81.1 (27.3)	86.3 (30.2)	90.6 (32.6)	95.8 (35.4)	97.8 (36.6)	96.9 (36.1)	92.5 (33.6)	85.7 (29.8)	79.7 (26.5)	73.2 (22.9)	99.2 (37.3)
Mean daily maximum °F (°C)	56.2 (13.4)	59.4 (15.2)	67.1 (19.5)	75.0 (23.9)	82.2 (27.9)	88.0 (31.1)	91.2 (32.9)	89.5 (31.9)	84.4 (29.1)	75.3 (24.1)	65.9 (18.8)	58.1 (14.5)	74.4 (23.5)
Daily mean °F (°C)	44.7 (7.1)	47.4 (8.6)	54.1 (12.3)	61.6 (16.4)	69.6 (20.9)	76.6 (24.8)	80.2 (26.8)	78.8 (26.0)	73.3 (22.9)	63.0 (17.2)	53.0 (11.7)	46.7 (8.2)	62.4 (16.9)
Mean daily minimum °F (°C)	33.1 (0.6)	35.4 (1.9)	41.1 (5.1)	48.3 (9.1)	57.1 (13.9)	65.3 (18.5)	69.1 (20.6)	68.2 (20.1)	62.2 (16.8)	50.7 (10.4)	40.1 (4.5)	35.3 (1.8)	50.5 (10.3)
Mean minimum °F (°C)	16.4 (−8.7)	20.9 (−6.2)	25.6 (−3.6)	33.1 (0.6)	43.8 (6.6)	56.1 (13.4)	62.2 (16.8)	60.5 (15.8)	48.5 (9.2)	35.1 (1.7)	27.8 (−2.3)	19.7 (−6.8)	14.0 (−10.0)
Record low °F (°C)	−3 (−19)	7 (−14)	11 (−12)	26 (−3)	37 (3)	40 (4)	53 (12)	52 (11)	36 (2)	26 (−3)	9 (−13)	5 (−15)	−3 (−19)
Average precipitation inches (mm)	4.47 (114)	4.21 (107)	4.94 (125)	3.04 (77)	3.07 (78)	4.04 (103)	3.94 (100)	4.59 (117)	3.97 (101)	3.42 (87)	3.38 (86)	3.93 (100)	47 (1,195)
Average precipitation days (≥ 0.01 in)	7.5	6.9	6.8	5.7	6.0	6.8	7.1	7.3	5.0	4.8	5.4	6.8	76.1
Source 1: NOAA
Source 2: National Weather Service (mean maxima/minima, precip/precip days 1981–2010)

== Demographics ==
Historical population
Census	Pop.	Note	%±
1880	1,022		—
1890	974		−4.7%
1900	1,113		14.3%
1910	1,368		22.9%
1920	1,407		2.9%
1930	1,289		−8.4%
1940	1,284		−0.4%
1950	1,442		12.3%
1960	1,770		22.7%
1970	2,073		17.1%
1980	2,172		4.8%
1990	2,056		−5.3%
2000	2,013		−2.1%
2010	1,937		−3.8%
2020	1,744		−10.0%
U.S. Decennial Census; 1850-1870 1870-1880; 1890-1910 1920-1930; 1940 1950 1960; 1970 1980 1990; 2000 2010

=== 2020 census ===
As of the 2020 census, Warrenton had a population of 1,744. The median age was 40.7 years. 25.3% of residents were under the age of 18 and 20.5% of residents were 65 years of age or older. For every 100 females there were 82.2 males, and for every 100 females age 18 and over there were 77.5 males age 18 and over.

0.0% of residents lived in urban areas, while 100.0% lived in rural areas.

There were 691 households in Warrenton, of which 34.6% had children under the age of 18 living in them. Of all households, 27.2% were married-couple households, 19.1% were households with a male householder and no spouse or partner present, and 48.2% were households with a female householder and no spouse or partner present. About 32.9% of all households were made up of individuals and 16.5% had someone living alone who was 65 years of age or older.

There were 785 housing units, of which 12.0% were vacant. The homeowner vacancy rate was 1.7% and the rental vacancy rate was 4.7%.

Warrenton racial composition as of 2020
Race	Num.	Perc.
White (non-Hispanic)	409	23.45%
Black or African American (non-Hispanic)	1,276	73.17%
Native American	2	0.11%
Asian	10	0.57%
Other/Mixed	35	2.01%
Hispanic or Latino	12	0.69%

== Education ==
=== Warren County School District ===
The Warren County School District holds pre-school to grade twelve, and consists of one elementary school, a middle school, and a high school. (The district has only 2 physical buildings, one for Pre-K and K, the other for 1–12.)The district has 70 full-time teachers and over 894 students.

- Freeman Elementary School
- Warren County Middle School
- Warren County High School

== See also ==
- Central Savannah River Area
