= Wrens, Georgia =

- City
- Location in Jefferson County and the state of Georgia
- Coordinates: 33°12′29″N 82°23′15″W
- Country: United States
- State: Georgia
- County: Jefferson

Area
  - Total: 3.14 sq mi (8.13 km^{2})
  - Land: 3.14 sq mi (8.12 km^{2})
  - Water: 0.0077 sq mi (0.02 km^{2})
- Elevation: 407 ft (124 m)

Population (2020)
  - Total: 2,217
  - Density: 707.5/sq mi (273.18/km^{2})
- Time zone: UTC-5 (Eastern (EST))
  - Summer (DST): UTC-4 (EDT)
- ZIP codes: 30818, 30833
- Area code: 706
- FIPS code: 13-84456
- GNIS feature ID: 0333472
- Website: cityofwrens.com

Wrens is a city in Jefferson County, Georgia, United States. The population was 2,217 at the 2020 census. It is located on U.S. Route 1, thirty miles west of Augusta.

== History ==
Wrens was laid out in 1884 when the railroad was extended to that point, and named after W.J. Wren, an early settler and merchant.

The Georgia General Assembly incorporated Wrens as a town in 1901. Wrens was incorporated again as a city in 1970.

== Geography ==
Wrens is located at 33°12′29″N 82°23′15″W. According to the United States Census Bureau, the city has a total area of 3.0 square miles (7.8 km^{2}), of which 3.0 square miles (7.8 km^{2}) is land and 0.33% is water.

== Demographics ==
Historical population
Census	Pop.	Note	%±
1910	616		—
1920	1,074		74.4%
1930	1,085		1.0%
1940	1,192		9.9%
1950	1,380		15.8%
1960	1,628		18.0%
1970	2,204		35.4%
1980	2,415		9.6%
1990	2,414		0.0%
2000	2,314		−4.1%
2010	2,187		−5.5%
2020	2,217		1.4%
U.S. Decennial Census; 1850-1870 1870-1880; 1890-1910 1920-1930; 1940 1950 1960; 1970 1980 1990; 2000 2010

=== Racial and ethnic composition ===
Wrens city, Georgia – Racial and ethnic composition Note: the US Census treats Hispanic/Latino as an ethnic category. This table excludes Latinos from the racial categories and assigns them to a separate category. Hispanics/Latinos may be of any race.
Race / Ethnicity (NH = Non-Hispanic)	Pop 2000	Pop 2010	Pop 2020	% 2000	% 2010	% 2020
White alone (NH)	765	679	643	33.06%	31.05%	29.00%
Black or African American alone (NH)	1,504	1,413	1,453	65.00%	64.61%	65.54%
Native American or Alaska Native alone (NH)	2	1	2	0.09%	0.05%	0.09%
Asian alone (NH)	4	12	9	0.17%	0.55%	0.41%
Native Hawaiian or Pacific Islander alone (NH)	0	0	0	0.00%	0.00%	0.00%
Other race alone (NH)	2	2	4	0.09%	0.09%	0.18%
Mixed race or Multiracial (NH)	19	25	51	0.82%	1.14%	2.30%
Hispanic or Latino (any race)	18	55	55	0.78%	2.51%	2.48%
Total	2,314	2,187	2,217	100.00%	100.00%	100.00%

=== 2020 census ===
As of the 2020 census, Wrens had a population of 2,217. The median age was 40.4 years. About 25.3% of residents were under age 18, and 18.8% were age 65 or older. For every 100 females, there were 81.0 males, and for every 100 females age 18 and over, there were 74.8 males.

0.0% of residents lived in urban areas, while 100.0% lived in rural areas.

There were 891 households in Wrens, of which 31.5% had children under the age of 18 living in them. Of all households, 29.1% were married-couple households, 20.1% were households with a male householder and no spouse or partner present, and 46.1% were households with a female householder and no spouse or partner present. About 31.1% of all households were made up of individuals, and 15.5% had someone living alone who was age 65 or older.

There were 1,003 housing units, of which 11.2% were vacant. The homeowner vacancy rate was 1.8%, and the rental vacancy rate was 5.4%.

== Notable people ==
- Erskine Caldwell, author of Tobacco Road and God's Little Acre
- Dr. Molly Howard, 2008 National Principal of the Year, Secondary School
- Bruce Kelly, landscape architect who created the John Lennon memorial Strawberry Fields in Central Park, New York
- Henry Johnson, former NFL linebacker, Minnesota Vikings
- Mark "M.V." Oliphant, actor, BMF on Starz,Tyler Perry's Divorced Sistas, TV One's Fatal Attraction
- Fernando Velasco, NFL center for the Tennessee Titans

== See also ==
- Local radio station: WPEH, Big Peach Radio (92.1 FM and 1420 AM)
- Central Savannah River Area
