= Central Savannah River Area =

Region in Georgia and South Carolina

Coordinates: 33°30′54″N 82°12′58″W

- CSRA
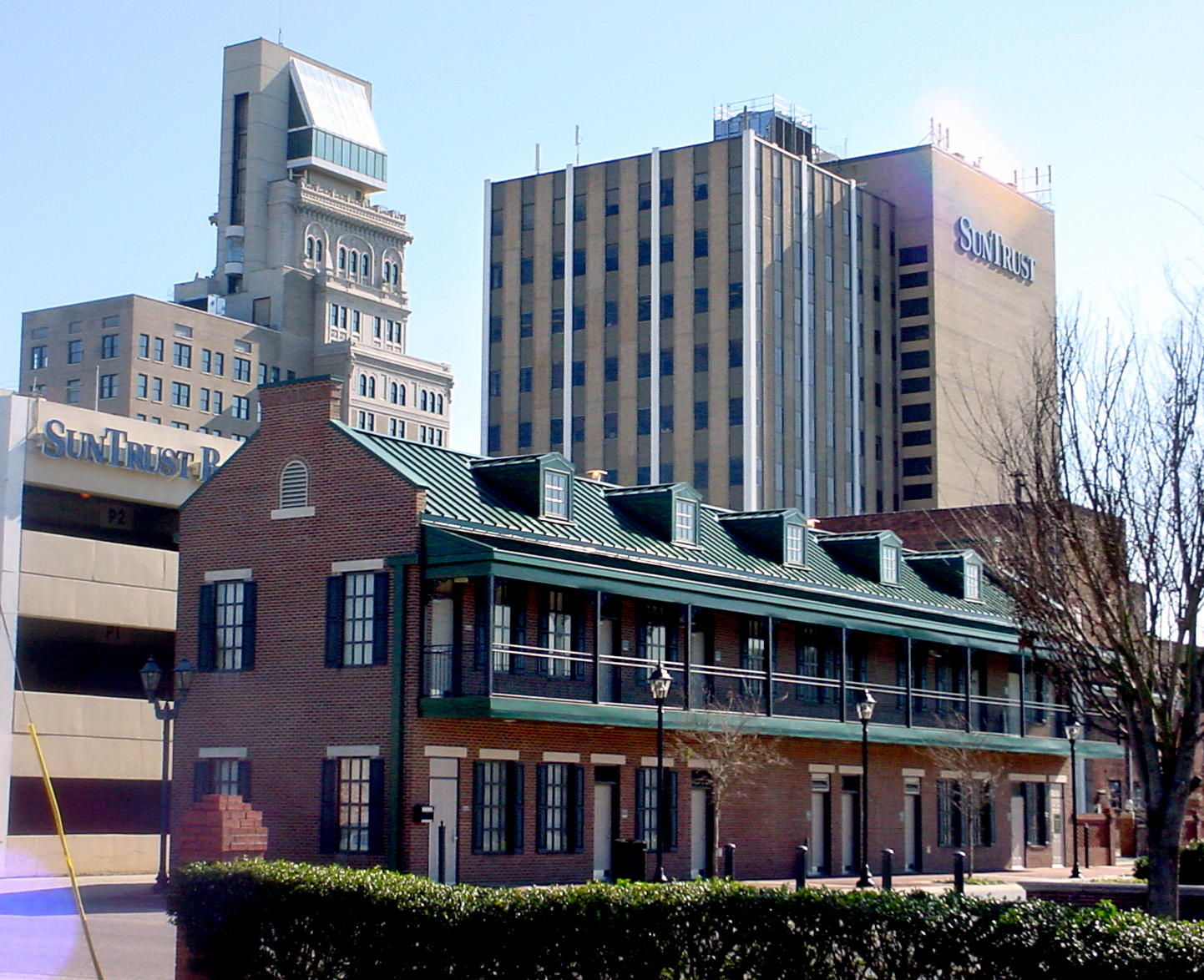
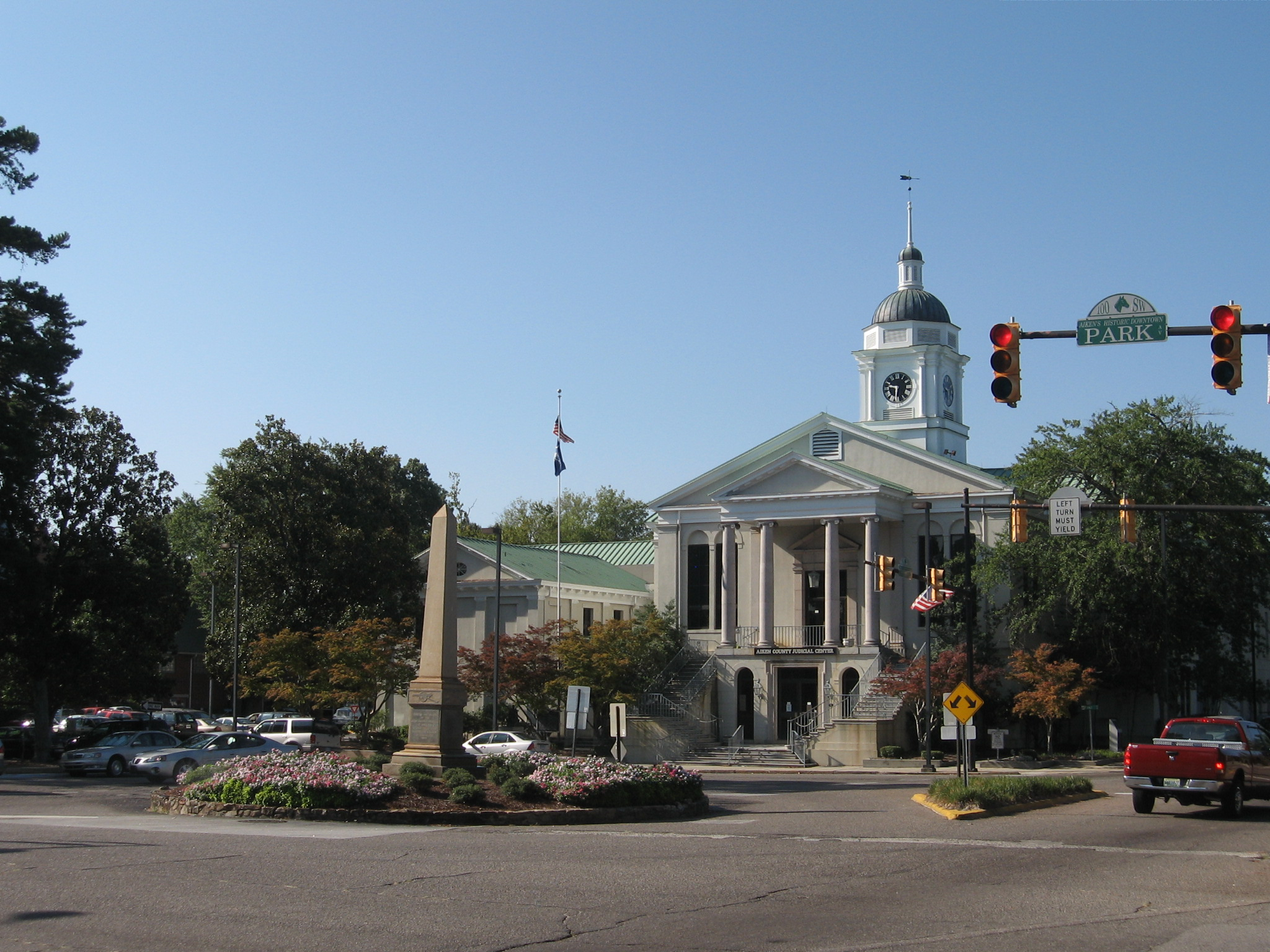
- Downtown Augusta on Broad Street The Aiken County Courthouse in Downtown Aiken

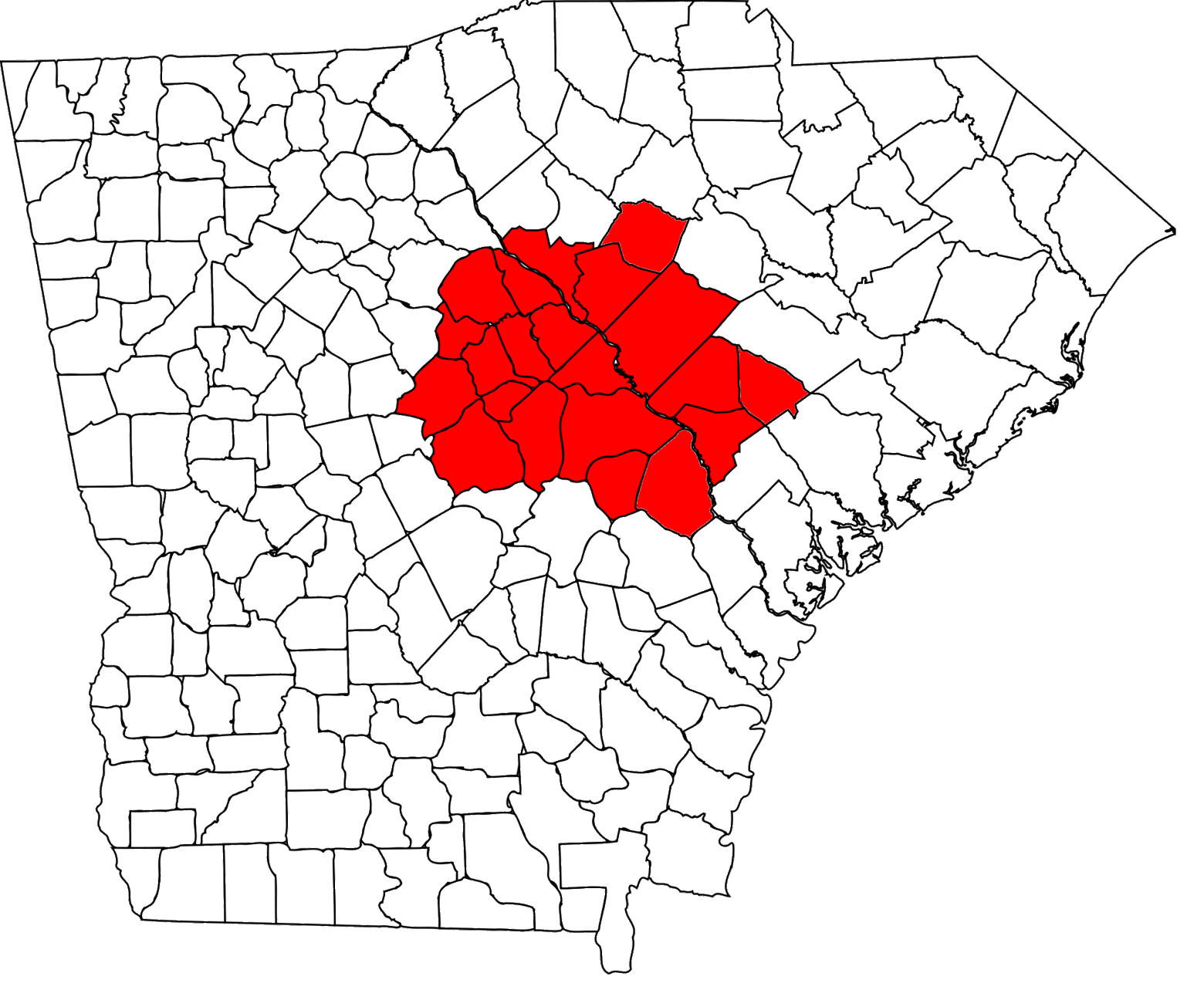
- Map outlining the Central Savannah River Area
- Country: United States
- State: Georgia; South Carolina
- Largest city: Augusta

Area
  - Total: 9,605 sq mi (24,880 km^{2})
  - Land: 9,400 sq mi (24,000 km^{2})
  - Water: 205 sq mi (530 km^{2}) 2.1%

Population (2018)
  - Total: 767,478
  - Density: 82/sq mi (32/km^{2})
- Time zone: UTC-5 (EST)
  - Summer (DST): UTC-4 (EDT)
- Area codes: 478, 706, 762, 803, 839, 864, 821,

The Central Savannah River Area (CSRA) is an unofficial trading and marketing region in the U.S. states of Georgia and South Carolina, spanning thirteen counties in Georgia and seven in South Carolina. The term was coined in 1950 by C.C. McCollum, the winner of a $250 contest held by The Augusta Chronicle to generate the best name for the area. Today the initialism is so commonly used that the full name is not known to all CSRA residents. The region is located on and named after the Savannah River, which forms the border between the two states. The largest cities within the CSRA are Augusta, Georgia and Aiken, South Carolina. (The CSRA does not include the city of Savannah, Georgia or any portion of the Savannah metropolitan area.)

The total population of the CSRA is 767,478 in 2018. According to the U.S. Census Bureau, the seven-county Augusta-Richmond County Metropolitan Statistical Area (the core of the CSRA) had a 2020 population of more than 611,000, making it the second most populous (after metro Atlanta) in the state of Georgia.

== Counties ==
=== In Georgia ===
County	Total area	Population (2018)
Richmond County	329 sq mi (850 km^{2})	201,554
Columbia County	308 sq mi (800 km^{2})	154,291
Burke County	835 sq mi (2,160 km^{2})	22,423
McDuffie County	266 sq mi (690 km^{2})	21,531
Washington County	684 sq mi (1,770 km^{2})	20,386
Jefferson County	530 sq mi (1,400 km^{2})	15,430
Wilkes County	474 sq mi (1,230 km^{2})	9,876
Jenkins County	352 sq mi (910 km^{2})	8,683
Hancock County	479 sq mi (1,240 km^{2})	9,429
Lincoln County	257 sq mi (670 km^{2})	7,915
Warren County	287 sq mi (740 km^{2})	5,251
Glascock County	144 sq mi (370 km^{2})	2,995
Taliaferro County	195 sq mi (510 km^{2})	1,608
Total:	5,796 sq mi (15,010 km^{2})	495,310

=== In South Carolina ===
County	Total area	Population (2018)
Aiken County	1,081 sq mi (2,800 km^{2})	170,872
Edgefield County	507 sq mi (1,310 km^{2})	27,052
Barnwell County	557 sq mi (1,440 km^{2})	21,112
Saluda County	462 sq mi (1,200 km^{2})	20,544
Bamberg County	396 sq mi (1,030 km^{2})	14,275
McCormick County	394 sq mi (1,020 km^{2})	9,410
Allendale County	412 sq mi (1,070 km^{2})	8,903
Total:	4,937 sq mi (12,790 km^{2})	272,168

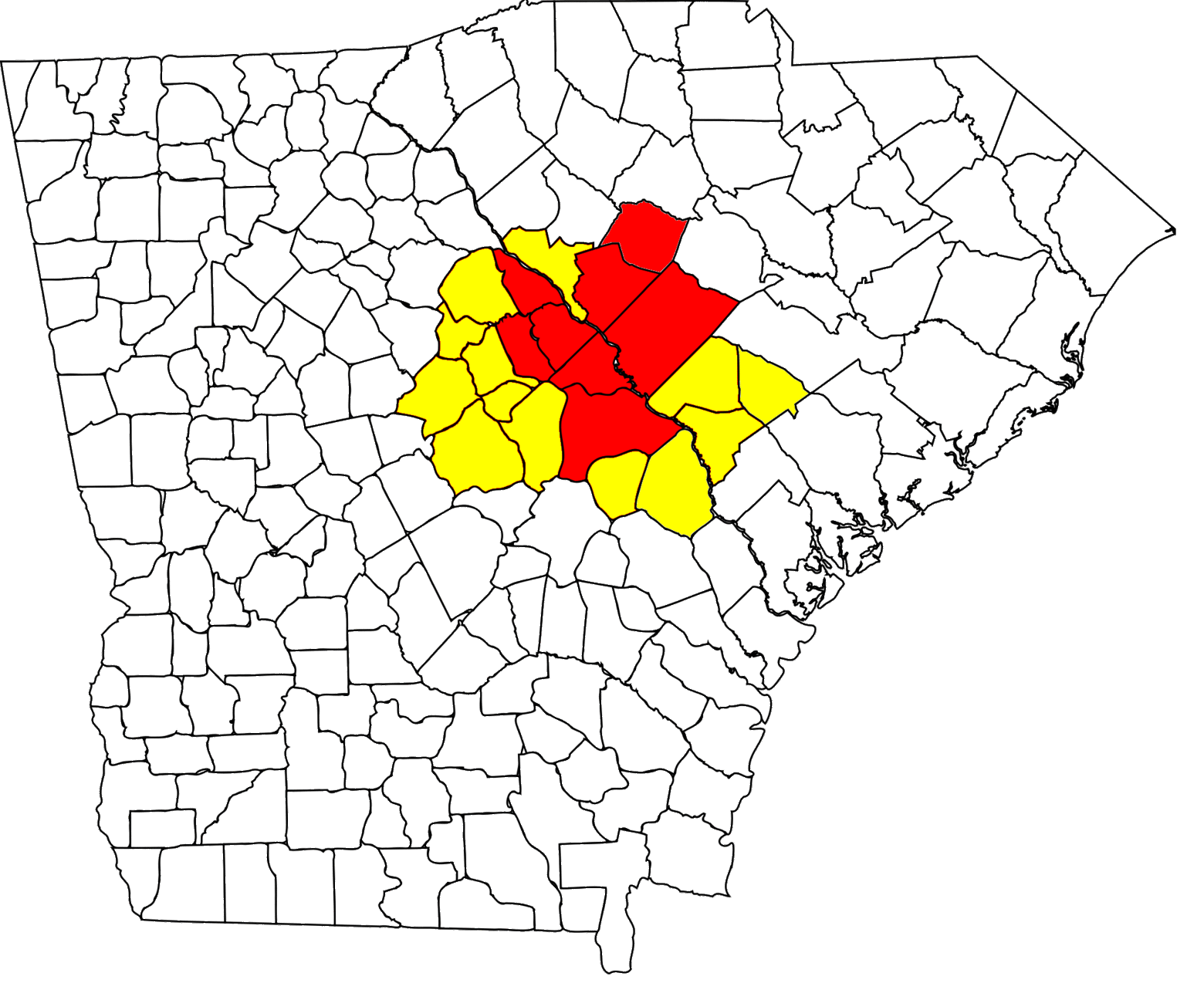
Map of the Central Savannah River Area, with the Augusta-Richmond County Metropolitan Statistical Area highlighted in red.

== Communities ==
=== Places with more than 40,000 inhabitants ===
- Augusta-Richmond County, Georgia (Principal city) Pop: 197,872

=== Places with 10,000 to 40,000 inhabitants ===
- Martinez, Georgia Pop: 35,795
- Aiken, South Carolina Pop: 29,884
- Evans, Georgia Pop: 29,011
- North Augusta, South Carolina Pop: 21,873
- Grovetown, Georgia Pop: 12,210

=== Places with 5,000 to 10,000 inhabitants ===
- Thomson, Georgia Pop: 6,718
- Belvedere, South Carolina Pop: 5,792
- Waynesboro, Georgia Pop: 5,816
- Sandersville, Georgia Pop: 5,912

=== Places with 1,000 to 5,000 inhabitants ===
- Edgefield, South Carolina Pop: 4,690
- Clearwater, South Carolina Pop: 4,370
- Hephzibah, Georgia Pop: 4,021
- Millen, Georgia Pop: 3,492
- Gloverville, South Carolina Pop: 2,831
- Burnettown, South Carolina Pop: 2,673
- Louisville, Georgia Pop: 2,215
- Harlem, Georgia Pop: 2,779
- Johnston, South Carolina Pop: 2,362
- New Ellenton, South Carolina Pop: 2,052
- Jackson, South Carolina Pop: 1,700
- Murphys Estates, South Carolina (census-designated place) Pop: 1,441
- Warrenton, Georgia Pop: 2,013

=== Places with less than 1,000 inhabitants ===
- Sardis, Georgia Pop: 999
- Wagener, South Carolina Pop: 797
- Blythe, Georgia Pop: 721
- Dearing, Georgia Pop: 549
- Salley, South Carolina Pop: 398
- Keysville, Georgia (partial) Pop: 332
- Midville, Georgia Pop: 269
- Monetta, South Carolina (partial) Pop: 236
- Perry, South Carolina Pop: 233
- Trenton, South Carolina Pop: 196
- Girard, Georgia Pop: 156
- Rayle, Georgia Pop: 158
- Windsor, South Carolina Pop: 121
- Vidette, Georgia Pop: 112
