= Georgia State Route 231 =

State highway in Georgia

State Route 231
- SR 231 highlighted in red

Route information
- Maintained by GDOT
- Length: 20.6 mi (33.2 km)
- Existed: 1940–present

Major junctions
- South end: SR 15 southwest of Harrison
- SR 242 in Riddleville; SR 24 in Davisboro
- North end: SR 88 / SR 540 north of Davisboro

Location
- Country: United States
- State: Georgia
- County: Washington

Highway system
- Georgia State Highway System; Interstate; US; State; Special
← SR 230	→ SR 232

State Route 231 (SR 231) is a 20.6-mile-long (33.2 km) north-south state highway in the central part of the U.S. state of Georgia. It travels entirely within Washington County. It serves as a de facto bypass or alternate route for travelers who desired to bypass Sandersville.

== Route description ==
SR 231 begins at an intersection with SR 15 southwest of Harrison. Here, the roadway continues as Harts Ford Road. The highway travels northeast, traveling through Harrison. It continues northeast and turns north, until it reaches the town of Riddleville. In Riddleville, it heads northeast, intersecting SR 242 (Bartow Road). The route heads north-northeast and turns northeast to Davisboro, where it intersects SR 24 just before leaving town. It heads north-northwest to meets its northern terminus, an intersection with SR 88/SR 540 (Fall Line Freeway). Here, the roadway continues as Tree Nursery Road.

SR 231 is not part of the National Highway System, a system of routes determined to be the most important for the nation's economy, mobility and defense.

== History ==
The roadway that would eventually become SR 231 was established in 1940 as SR 24 Spur along a short alignment from Downtown Davisboro to the intersection with SR 24 in the northern part of the city. In 1943, SR 24 Spur was redesignated as SR 231, and was extended to its current southern terminus. In 1944, the original section of the road was paved. In 1951, a short section southwest of Harrison was paved. By September 1953, the entire section from the southern terminus to Harrison was paved. The next year, a very brief section just northeast of Harrison was paved. By 1957, the entire section from Riddleville to SR 24 was paved, and by 1960, the road was paved from its southern terminus to SR 24. On the 1966 GDOT road map, the roadway that would eventually become the northern part of SR 231 from Davisboro to its northern terminus was displayed as a "connecting road". By 1991, this roadway was paved and designated as the northern extension of SR 231.

== Major intersections ==
The entire route is in Washington County.

Location	mi	km	Destinations	Notes
	0.0	0.0	SR 15 / Harts Ford Road south – Wrightsville, Sandersville	Southern terminus; roadway continues as Harts Ford Road.
Riddleville	10.2	16.4	SR 242 (Bartow Road) – Sandersville, Bartow	
Davisboro	17.2	27.7	SR 24 – Sandersville, Louisville	
	20.6	33.2	SR 88 / SR 540 (Fall Line Freeway) / Tree Nursery Road north – Sandersville, Wrens, Augusta	Northern terminus; roadway continues as Tree Nursery Road.
1.000 mi = 1.609 km; 1.000 km = 0.621 mi
