= Fall Line Freeway =

Highway in Georgia

State Route 540
- Fall Line Freeway
- Fall Line Freeway highlighted in red

Route information
- Maintained by GDOT
- Length: 216.34 mi (348.17 km)
- Existed: September 24, 2018–present
- History: Constituent highways constructed in stages since at least 1919; Completed between August 2017 and July 2018; Signed as SR 540 on September 24, 2018
- Component highways: US 80 from the Alabama state line to Geneva and from Macon to East Macon; SR 22 from the Alabama state line to Geneva; SR 41 in Geneva; SR 96 from Geneva to west of Fort Valley; SR 90 from west of Junction City to Junction City; SR 49 Conn. from west of Fort Valley to Fort Valley; SR 49 from Fort Valley to Byron; I-75 from Byron to Macon; I-16 in Macon; SR 87 from Macon to East Macon; US 23 / US 129 Alt. from Macon to East Macon; SR 19 from Macon to East Macon; SR 57 from East Macon to southwest of Gordon; SR 24 from southeast of Milledgeville to east of Sandersville; SR 88 from east of Sandersville to Wrens; US 1 / SR 4 from Wrens to Augusta; US 221 / SR 17 in Wrens
- NHS: Entire route

Major junctions
- West end: US 80 / SR 8 / SR 22 at the Alabama state line at the Phenix City, Alabama–Columbus line
- I-185 / US 27 / SR 1 in Columbus; US 80 / SR 22 / SR 96 in Geneva; US 19 / SR 3 in Butler; I-75 / SR 49 in Byron; I-16 / I-75 in Macon; I-16 / US 80 / SR 87 in Macon; US 80 / SR 19 / SR 57 in East Macon; US 441 / SR 29 near Scottsboro; US 1 / US 221 / SR 4 / SR 17 in Wrens
- East end: I-520 / US 1 / SR 4 in Augusta

Location
- Country: United States
- State: Georgia
- Counties: Muscogee, Talbot, Taylor, Crawford, Peach, Bibb, Jones, Twiggs, Wilkinson, Baldwin, Washington, Jefferson, Richmond

Highway system
- Georgia State Highway System; Interstate; US; State; Special
← SR 520	→ SR 555

The Fall Line Freeway (FLF), also signed as State Route 540 (SR 540), is a 216.34-mile-long (348.17 km) highway designed to span the width of the U.S. state of Georgia from Columbus at the Alabama state line to Augusta, traveling through several cities including Macon, Fort Valley, Sandersville, and Wrens. Though it is called a freeway, it is composed of both limited-access and high-speed divided highway portions. There are also two segments of the highway that are two lanes, separated by a center turn lane: a brief portion in west-central Washington County (west of Sandersville) and another brief portion in northern Jefferson County (completely within the city limits of Wrens). As of August 2018, the Fall Line Freeway is 100% open to traffic. Between August 2017 and July 2018, the highway was completed. The Georgia Department of Transportation (GDOT) announced that the highway was officially signed as SR 540 on September 24, 2018, as the newest state route in the state.

Most of the FLF was a piecing together of segments of pre-existing highways, upon which SR 540 was designated in September 2018. It consists of U.S. Route 80 (US 80) from the Alabama state line to Geneva and from Macon to East Macon; SR 22 from Alabama to Geneva; SR 41 in Geneva; SR 96 from Geneva to the west of Fort Valley; SR 90 from west of Junction City to Junction City; SR 49 Connector (SR 49 Conn.) from west of Fort Valley to Fort Valley; SR 49 from Fort Valley to Byron; Interstate 75 (I-75) from Byron to Macon; I-16 in Macon; SR 87 from Macon to East Macon; US 23/US 129 Alternate (US 129 Alt.) from Macon to East Macon; SR 19 from Macon to East Macon; SR 57 from East Macon to southwest of Gordon; SR 24 from southeast of Milledgeville to east of Sandersville; SR 88 from east of Sandersville to Wrens; US 1/SR 4 from Wrens to Augusta; US 221 in Wrens; and SR 17 in Wrens.

From 2018 to 2019, the highway formerly used the southern portion of SR 243, from southwest of Gordon to north-northeast of Ivey, until that highway was decommissioned. The portion of the highway from north-northeast of Ivey to southeast of Milledgeville was a newly built highway, specifically for this project.

In November 2021, the Infrastructure Investment and Jobs Act was enacted, designating the Fall Line Freeway corridor from Columbus to Augusta as the "Middle Georgia Corridor," part of the proposed Interstate 14 (I-14) Gulf Coast Strategic Highway. The Fall Line Freeway would need to be bypassed or upgraded to meet interstate highway standards.

== Route description ==
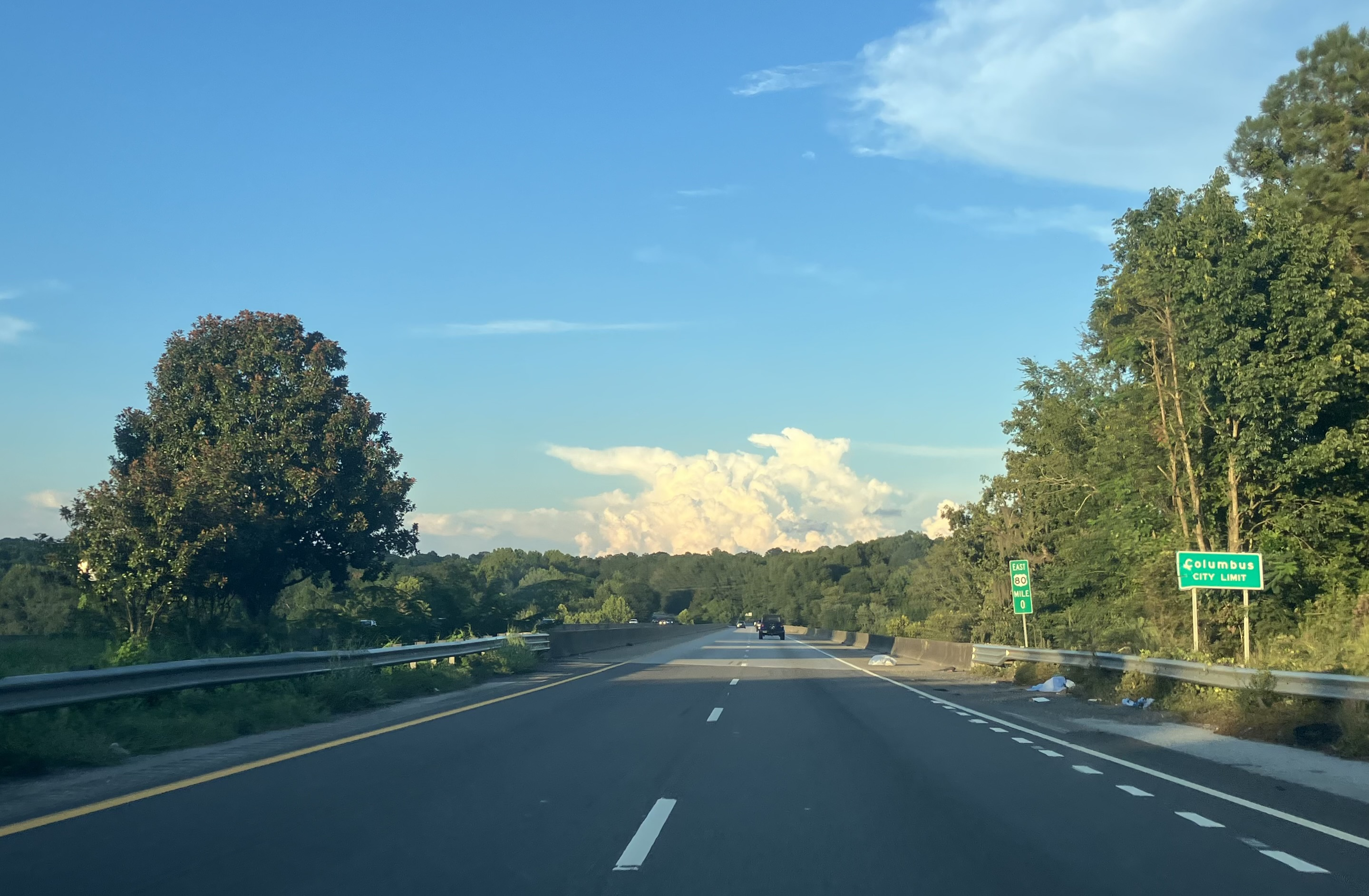
The western terminus of the Fall Line Freeway where US 80 crosses over the Chattahoochee River from Alabama into Georgia

Contrary to its description as a "freeway," the Fall Line Freeway is a four-lane divided highway, except for short two-lane sections west of Sandersville and within Wrens and undivided portions in places like Reynolds, Macon, and Ivey. Four freeway sections exist: following the J.R. Allen Parkway (part of US 80/SR 22), which is the bypass north of Columbus, Interstate 75 (I-75) from Byron to Macon, I-16 in Macon, and the interchange with US 441 between Ivey and Sandersville, south of Milledgeville. The highway is designed to assist the flow of commercial traffic, providing an easier path for freight trucks carrying goods between Columbus and Augusta, avoiding Atlanta. Much of the route follows US 80, SR 96, SR 24, SR 88, and US 1/SR 4, while other parts are separate alignments, such as much of the portion between Scottsboro and Sandersville. The route is named for the fall line escarpment it follows, a geographical division between the coastal plain and inland hills.

=== Muscogee County ===
SR 540 and the FLF begin on an unnamed bridge over the Chattahoochee River, at the Alabama state line, on the Phenix City, Alabama–Columbus city line, concurrent with U.S. Route 80 (US 80) and SR 22. The state line is also the western terminus of SR 22. On the Alabama side of the state line, US 80 (and the unsigned designation Alabama State Route 8) travel on the J.R. Allen Parkway, a freeway into Phenix City. On the Georgia side, US 80, SR 22, SR 540, and the FLF utilize the parkway as a bypass of most of Columbus. They head to the east-northeast and curve to the northeast. Immediately, they have an interchange with the northern terminus of SR 22 Connector (SR 22 Conn.; Manchester Expressway). Just over 1,000 feet (300 m) later, they meet SR 219 (River Road). After an interchange with Bradley Park Drive, they meet Interstate 185 (I-185 and its unsigned companion designation SR 411) and US 27/SR 1 (Veterans Parkway). On the eastbound side is also access to Moon Road, which has a separate exit on the westbound side. The highways then meet Blackmon and Schomburg roads. After a curve to the southeast, the freeway ends, and the roadway changes to a divided highway. Almost immediately, they have an interchange with US 27 Alternate (US 27 Alt.) and SR 85. They curve to the east-northeast and then meet the eastern terminus of SR 22 Spur (Macon Road). They travel in a generally northeastern direction until entering Upatoi. There, they curve to the southeast. Then, they curve back to the east-northeast and cross over Baker Creek, where they leave the city limits of Columbus and Muscogee County and enter Talbot County.

=== Talbot County ===
The highway continues to the east-northeast and travels just to the north of Box Springs. After beginning to head to the northeast, FLF crosses over Rockmore and Upatoi creeks and intersects the northern terminus of SR 355. It curves to an easterly direction and intersects SR 41, which joins the concurrency. US 80, SR 22, SR 41, SR 540, and the FLF curves to the northeast and enters Geneva. In the central part of the city, US 80, SR 22, and SR 41 make a left turn to the north-northwest at the western terminus of SR 96. Here, the FLF takes the beginning of SR 96 to the northeast. Almost immediately, it intersects the western terminus of SR 240. The roadway curves to the east-southeast and leaves Geneva. The highway then intersects a former segment of SR 96. Then, it begins a gradual curve to the northeast. Right after curving back to the south-southeast, it begins a concurrency with SR 90. Approximately 2,000 feet (610 m) later, SR 90, SR 96, SR 540, and the FLF intersect another former segment of SR 96. The highway enters Junction City. It curved to the east-southeast and intersects Old Mauk Road, which leads to the main part of Junction City. It curved to the east-northeast and intersected the southern terminus of Buckner Road, which also leads to the main part of the city. At this intersection, SR 90 turns right to the south-southeast. The FLF curves back to the east-southeast, leaving the city limits and enters Taylor County.

=== Taylor County ===
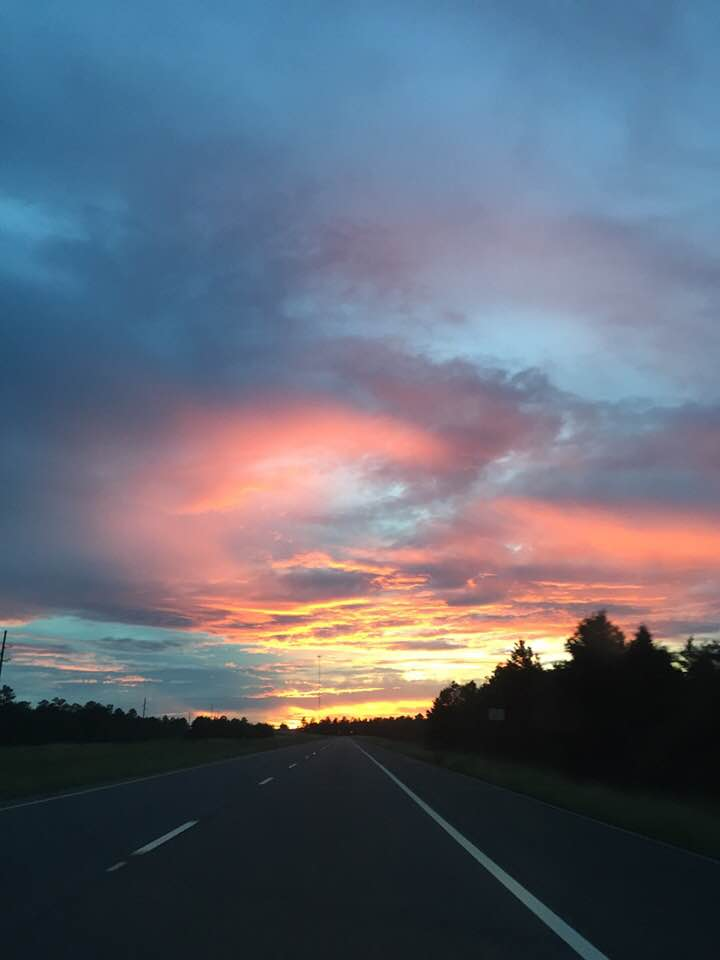
The Fall Line Freeway as seen in between Columbus and Macon

The FLF (SR 96, SR 540 ) travels through the southern part of Howard. Just after beginning a curve to the south-southeast, it intersects the western terminus of Old 96 Road, the former path of SR 96 through Butler. The highway travels on a southern bypass of the city. Just west of the city is an intersection with SR 137 (Charing Road). The highway curves to the east-southeast. Just before an intersection with the northern terminus of Payne Farm Road and the southern terminus of Tower Street, it enters the southern part of Butler. There, it intersects US 19/SR 3 (South Broad Street). Just after leaving the city limits of Butler, the highway curves to the northeast. After a curve to the east-northeast, it intersects the eastern terminus of SR 96's former path through Butler. It curves to the southeast and enters Reynolds just before an intersection with the southern terminus of Hicks Road. It curves to the east and enters the main part of the city. It intersects SR 128 (Winston Street). Just west of Collins Street, the highway curves to the east-northeast. It curves to the east-southeast and leaves the city limits of Reynolds just to the west of an intersection with the northern terminus of South General John B. Gordon Road. It curves to the southeast and then back to the east- northeast. and crosses over the Flint River on the Ward Edwards Bridge. Here, it enters Crawford County.

=== Crawford and Peach counties ===
SR 96, SR 540, and the FLF curve to the east-southeast and then gradually curve to the northeast. During a curve to the east-northeast, they enter Peach County. Just to the west of Aldridge Road, they re-enter Crawford County. Less than 2,000 feet (610 m) later, they re-enter Peach County. They curve to the northeast and intersect the southern terminus of SR 49 Conn. Here, SR 96 turns right to the southeast, towards Fort Valley, while SR 49 Conn., SR 540, and the FLF head to the northeast on a bypass of the city. They curve to the east-northeast. Just after an intersection with Peggy Drive, they pass Fort Valley Middle School. After a curve to the northeast, they pass Hunt Elementary School and intersect US 341/SR 7 (Hartley Road). They curve to a due-east direction before curving to the southeast, where they intersect SR 49. Here, SR 49 Conn. ends, and SR 540 and the FLF take SR 49 to the northeast. They curve to the east-northeast and then back to the northeast. They cross over Mule Creek and enter Powersville. There, they intersect the western terminus of SR 247 Conn. (Robert Ray Parkway) and the southern terminus of Newell Road. The highways curve to the north-northeast. They enter Byron. In the city, they intersect SR 42. At an interchange with I-75 (and its unsigned companion designation SR 401), SR 540 and the FLF split off of SR 49 and follow I-75 to the north. I-75, SR 401, SR 540, and the FLF curve to the north-northeast and leave Byron and then re-enter Crawford County. Just a short distance later, they cross over Echeconnee Creek into Bibb County.

=== Bibb County ===
The highways reach the Coach Billy Henderson Interchange with Sardis Church Road. Approximately 2 miles (3.2 km) later is an interchange with Hartley Bridge Road. About 1 mile (1.6 km) later, they meet the southern terminus of I-475 (and its unsigned companion designation SR 408). They curve to the northeast. At a bridge over Rocky Creek, they enter the city limits of Macon. Immediately, they have an interchange with US 41/SR 247 (Pio Nono Avenue). Within this interchange, I-75, SR 401, SR 540, and the FLF curve back to the north-northeast. Just after this interchange, they have a partial exit with Rocky Creek Road, which is only accessed from the westbound lanes. Access to US 41 north and SR 247 north for the westbound lanes is provided via this interchange. Approximately 2 miles (3.2 km) later, they curve to a nearly due-north direction and meet US 80/SR 22 (Eisenhower Parkway). At a bridge over Anthony Road, they curve to the north-northwest. Right after this bridge is an interchange with the eastern terminus of SR 74 (Mercer University Drive). Within this interchange, the highways curve to the northeast. They then meet US 41 Bus./SR 19 (Forsyth Street). This interchange also provides access to Hardeman Avenue. The highways then curve back to the north-northeast. Just after they travel under a bridge that carries US 23/SR 87 (Riverside Drive), they meet the western terminus of I-16 (and its unsigned companion designation SR 404) at the Major Bobby Jones MD POW–MIA Interchange.

Here, SR 540 and the FLF split off of I-75/SR 401 and begin a concurrency with I-16/SR 404. The highways travel to the east-southeast. Immediately, they cross over the Ocmulgee River. They curve to the southeast and then have an interchange with US 23/US 129/SR 49 (Spring Street). Within this interchange, the roadway curves to the south-southeast. Almost immediately is a westbound-only interchange with SR 22 (Second Street). About 0.3 miles (0.48 km) later, they meet US 80/SR 87 (known as M.L. King Jr. Boulevard south of I-16 and Coliseum Drive north of it) at the Phil Walden Memorial Interchange. Here, SR 540 and the FLF split off of I-16 and begin following US 80/SR 87. They travel to the northeast and pass the Macon Coliseum. Then they curve to the north-northeast and pass the Georgia Secretary of State's Professional Licensing Boards Division. An intersection with the appropriately named Hospital Drive leads to Coliseum Medical Centers. Approximately 1,000 feet (300 m) later, they intersect US 23/US 129 Alt./SR 19 (Emery Highway). Here, US 80, SR 87, SR 540, and the FLF turn right onto the other highways. The six highways (plus Emery Highway and the FLF) travel due east. They curve to the east-northeast and enter the northern part of Ocmulgee Mounds National Historical Park. They reach the main entrance to the park. This is also the southern terminus of Jeffersonville Road, which leads to Bowden Golf Course. The highways curve to the southeast and temporarily leave the park's boundary. Almost immediately, they re-enter the park's boundary. They cross over Walnut Creek, leave the park's boundary, leave the city limits of Macon and enter East Macon. Approximately 3,000 feet (910 m) later, they begin a curve to the east. Right after this, US 23, US 129 Alt., and SR 87 resume their southeasterly course, while US 80, SR 19, SR 540, and the FLF split off to the east. The highways curve to a northeasterly direction. They intersect the northern terminus of SR 87 Conn. (Ocmulgee East Boulevard) and the southern terminus of Jeffersonville Road. After a gradual curve to the east-southeast, they intersect the western terminus of SR 57 and the southern terminus of Hitchcock Road. Here, US 80 and SR 19 turned right to the south-southeast, while SR 540 and the FLF take SR 57 to the east-northeast. About 1 mile (1.6 km) later, the highways leave East Macon and enter Jones County.

=== Jones, Twiggs, Wilkinson, and Baldwin counties ===
SR 57, SR 540, and the FLF curve to the east-southeast. After beginning a curve to the southeast, they enter Twiggs County. They curve back to the east-southeast, travel just south of Harrisons Lake, and cross over Big Sandy Creek. Just before an intersection with the northern terminus of New Haven Church Road and the southern terminus of Old Griswoldville Road, they begin a curve to the east-northeast and travel north of Birdsong Pond. After this curve, they cross over Clear Creek. A short distance later, they enter Wilkinson County. Nearly 3,000 feet (910 m) later, the highways begin a curve to the north-northeast and intersect the western terminus of former SR 243 and Maddox Road. Here, SR 57 turns right onto Maddox Road to the east-southeast, and SR 540 and the FLF continue to the north-northeast. They function like a bypass of the main part of Gordon. They curve to the northeast and cross over Little Commissioner Creek. Just northwest of the city, the highways intersect SR 18 (Gray Highway). They curve to the east-southeast and enter the northern part of Gordon. They temporarily leave Gordon and curve to the east-northeast. They skirt through the extreme northeastern part of the city. When they again leave Gordon, they enter Ivey. The highways curve to the north-northeast and then cross over Lake Tchukolaho on the McCook Bridge. At a crossing over Beaver Creek on the O.L. "Red" Brooks Memorial Bridge, the highways leave Ivey. They begin a curve to the east-northeast to an intersection where former SR 243 turns left onto Pennington Highway to the north-northeast, while SR 540 and the FLF continue to the east-northeast. A short distance later, they clip the southern corner of Baldwin County. The highways re-enter Wilkinson County. They curve to the northeast and cross over Black Creek. They curve back to the east-northeast to an interchange with US 441/SR 29. SR 540 and the FLF curve to the north-northeast and re-enter Baldwin County. They curve back to the northeast. Just after beginning to curve back to the north-northeast, they meet SR 112. They cross over Reedy Creek and curve to the northeast. They cross over the Oconee River at a point just southeast of the southeastern point of Milledgeville. They curve to the east-northeast and then to the southeast. They then begin a concurrency with SR 24. SR 540 and the FLF take SR 24 to the south-southeast. They curve back to the southeast and cross over Town Creek just after a curve to the east-southeast. The highways curve back to the southeast and cross over Gumm Creek, entering Washington County.

=== Washington County ===
Approximately 2,000 feet (610 m) later, SR 24, SR 540, and the FLF curve to the east-southeast and intersect the northern terminus of SR 272. They cross over Bluff Creek and then curve back to the east-northeast. Along the way to Sandersville, they cross over Buffalo Creek. Just west of the city, the highways intersect the eastern terminus of SR 68 (Tennille–Macon Road) and the southern terminus of SR 24 Spur (Yank Brown Road). SR 24, SR 540, and the FLF travel on a northern bypass of the main part of the city. They curve to the northeast and cross over Limestone Creek. Then they intersect the western terminus of SR 242 (West Church Street). They curve back to the east-northeast and intersect Deepstep Road, which leads to Oconee Fall Line Technical College. This intersection is on the edge of the city limits of Sandersville. Almost immediately, the highways enter the northern part of the city. They then intersect Linton Road, which leads to the Linton community, T.J. Elder Middle School, and Brentwood School. The highways curve to the southeast and intersect SR 15 (Sparta Road). A short distance later, they leave the city limits of the city. They curve to the east-northeast and intersect Ridge Road. Here, SR 24 turns right to the south-southwest, while SR 540 and the FLF take the beginning of SR 88 to the east-northeast. They cross over Williamson Swamp Creek before intersecting the northern terminus of SR 231 (Tree Nursery Road). Then, they cross over the Ogeechee River to enter Jefferson County.

=== Jefferson County ===
After curving to the north-northeast, they enter the Grange community. There, they intersect SR 171 (Grange Road). Then, the highways cross over Rocky Comfort Creek. After that, they curve to the northeast. Just before an intersection with the southern terminus of Hadden Pond Road, they curve back to the east-northeast. SR 88, SR 540, and the FLF cross over Duhart Creek, curve to a northeasterly direction, and intersect SR 296. They cross over Big Creek and curve back to the northeast. After beginning a curve to the east-southeast, they enter Wrens. They intersect US 1, US 221, SR 4, and SR 17 (Jefferson Davis Memorial Highway). SR 88, SR 540, and the FLF turn left onto the other highways. US 1, US 221, SR 4, SR 17, SR 88, SR 540, and the FLF travel to the north-northeast, into the main part of the city. At an intersection with the western terminus of Howard Street, SR 17 departs the concurrency to the north-northwest on Thomson Highway. In downtown Wrens, they intersect SR 80 (Broad Street), where SR 88 departs the concurrency to the east-northeast. They curve to the northeast and intersect the eastern terminus of SR 47. Here, US 221 departs the concurrency, with it and SR 47 traveling to the north-northwest. After leaving Wrens, US 1, SR 4, SR 540, and the FLF cross over Reedy Creek on the Floyd L. Norton Memorial Bridge. They curve to the north-northeast and cross over Brier Creek, entering Richmond County and the city limits of Augusta.

=== Richmond County ===
US 1, SR 4, SR 540, and the FLF curve to the east-northeast and cross over Boggy Gut Creek. After curving back to the northeast, they cross over Sandy Run Creek. Then, they curve to the east, before curving to the east-northeast. The highways enter the city limits of Blythe. They intersect the western terminus of Church Street, which leads to Blythe city hall, a U.S. Post Office, and Blythe Elementary School. They begin a curve to the northeast. On this curve they intersect SR 88 and the southern terminus of Hoods Chapel Road. They leave Blythe and re-enter Augusta. They curve to the north-northeast and cross over South Prong Creek. The concurrency begins to curve back to the northeast. On this curve, they cross over Spirit Creek. This crossing is just south of Gordon Lakes Golf Course. They intersect the northern terminus of Willis Foreman Road before an interchange with Tobacco Road. They cross over Butler Creek and curve to the east-northeast to an intersection with the northern terminus of Meadowbrook Drive and the southern terminus of Barton Chapel Road. The roadway begins a curve back to the northeast. At an interchange with I-520 (Bobby Jones Expressway; and its unsigned companion designation SR 415), both SR 540 and the FLF end, while US 1 and SR 4 continue into the heart of Augusta.

== History ==
=== 1920s to 1960s ===
The roadway that would eventually become SR 540 (Fall Line Freeway) was established at least as early as 1919 as part of SR 22 in the northern part of the Columbus area, SR 49 from Fort Valley to Byron, SR 24 in the western part of the Sandersville area, and an unnumbered road from Wrens to Augusta. By the end of 1921, SR 22 was shifted southward to travel between Columbus and Geneva. SR 19 was established from Macon to East Macon. SR 57 was established between East Macon and Gordon. SR 24 was placed on the Wrens–Augusta segment. By October 1926, US 80 was designated on the Columbus–Geneva segment. US 1 was designated on the Wrens–Augusta segment. By October 1929, SR 24 was removed from the Wrens–Augusta segment and was replaced with SR 4. In 1931, SR 96 was established between Geneva and Reynolds. In 1937, SR 96 was shifted to the southeast, onto the Reynolds–Fort Valley segment. Between January 1945 and November 1946, SR 243 was designated between Gordon to south-southwest of Milledgeville. Between June 1960 and June 1963, I-75 was proposed in the Byron area. An unnumbered road was built from SR 171 northwest of Louisville to Wrens. By 1966, I-75 was completed from Byron to the I-475 interchange and proposed from there to the I-16 interchange. I-16 was proposed in Macon. SR 88 was established on the Sandersville–Wrens segment. In 1966, I-16 was completed in Macon. The next year, US 80/SR 22 was proposed to be shifted southward in the Macon area.

=== 1970s and 1980s ===
In 1970, I-75 was completed just south of I-16. The next year, I-75 was completed in the Macon area. In 1983, the J.R. Allen Parkway, the freeway bypass of the main part of Columbus, was proposed along its current path. By the beginning of 1986, this freeway was under construction from the Alabama state line to just east of US 27/SR 1. A southeastern bypass of Macon, designated as SR 758, was proposed from US 80/SR 22 at US 41 Bus./US 129 Alt./SR 11 in the southern part of the city east-northeast, northeast, and north-northeast to US 23/US 80/US 129 Alt./SR 19/SR 87 east of Ocmulgee National Monument in what is now East Macon. In 1988, it was completed, with US 80/SR 22 shifted onto it. The northern bypass of Fort Valley, designated as SR 49 Connector, was proposed on its current path. Also, the northern bypass of Sandersville, designated as SR 816, was proposed from Deepstep Road northwest of the city to SR 88 east-northeast of it. In 1989, SR 816's proposed path was extended westward to SR 24 west of Sandersville.

=== 1990s and 2000s ===
In 1991, the Sandersville bypass was completed and redesignated as a westward extension of SR 88. The next year, SR 49 Conn. was completed. In 1993, a southern bypass of Butler, designated as SR 827, was proposed from SR 96 west-northwest of the city to SR 96 east of it. In 1997, the western part of SR 758 was completed. In 1999, this bypass's proposed designation, SR 827, was canceled. In 2000, all of SR 758, except for the completed portion, was canceled. At this time, the Butler bypass was completed, but no route number was designated. In 2004, a new roadway, from SR 243 north-northeast of Ivey to SR 24 southeast of Milledgeville, was proposed. Also, SR 758 was re-proposed on its previous path. The next year, SR 758's proposed path was again canceled. Also, the proposed roadway between Ivey and Sandersville was also canceled. In 2006, SR 96 was shifted onto the Butler bypass. Also, SR 758 was decommissioned.

=== 2010s ===
Between 2011 and 2013, SR 243 was extended southward as a western bypass of Gordon. The highway's final 9-mile-long (14 km) section of new roadway between SR 24 and US 441 south of Milledgeville in Baldwin and Wilkinson counties, as well of the 16-mile-long (26 km) widening of SR 24 to the Sandersville bypass, was awarded to Balfour Beatty Infrastructure, Inc. of Fleming Island, Florida in January 2013. It appears as though GDOT has delayed plans to address the highway's passage through the city of Wrens, where it reduces to a two-lane road through downtown with a center turn lane. According to GDOT's GRIP maps, the section through Wrens is considered complete. Other documents suggest that GDOT has entertained the idea of a Wrens bypass, however. The highway was estimated to cost $75.3 million. Between 2013 and 2015, a new road was built from SR 243 north-northeast of Ivey to US 441/SR 29 south-southeast of Scottsboro. The segment between the Scottsboro and Sandersville areas was completed and opened to traffic in October 2016. In 2016, the new portion of highway was extended to SR 24 southeast of Milledgeville, and SR 243 was extended on it. Between August 2017 and July 2018, the highway was completed. GDOT announced to the public that the highway was officially signed as Georgia State Route 540 on September 24, 2018. In October 2018, GDOT began installing SR 540 shields in Columbus.

== Future ==
The 2021 Infrastructure Investment and Jobs Act designated the Fall Line Freeway as a future extension of Interstate 14 (I-14), which currently connects Copperas Cove to Belton, Texas. The extension, if ultimately built, will cross Texas, Louisiana, Mississippi, Alabama, and Georgia, ending in Augusta, Georgia. This routing is listed under High Priority Corridor 102, the Middle Georgia Corridor, with I-14 generally following (and possibly overlapping part of) the FLF. A timeline for this has not been determined. The Fall Line Freeway's inclusion to an expanded I-14 would require substantial upgrades (including several bypasses) to meet interstate highway standards.

== Major intersections ==
County	Location	mi	km	Exit	Destinations	Notes
Chattahoochee River		0.000	0.000		US 80 west (SR 8 west) / SR 22 begins – Phenix City, Montgomery	Western terminus; western end of US 80 and SR 22 concurrencies; continuation into Alabama
Muscogee	Columbus	0.613	0.987	1	SR 22 Conn. south to SR 85 – Downtown Columbus	Northern terminus of SR 22 Conn.
Muscogee	Columbus	1.310	2.108	2	SR 219 (River Road)	
Muscogee	Columbus	2.488	4.004	3	Bradley Park Drive	Diverging diamond interchange
Muscogee	Columbus	3.780	6.083	4	I-185 (SR 411) / US 27 / SR 1 (Veterans Parkway) – Fort Benning, Atlanta	I-185 exit 10
Muscogee	Columbus	5.885	9.471	5	Moon Road	Eastbound exit is combined with exit 4; also has exit for US 27/SR 1 (Veterans Parkway).
Muscogee	Columbus	7.124	11.465	6	Schomburg Road / Blackmon Road	
Muscogee	Midland	9.452	15.212		Flat Rock Road	At-grade intersection; eastern end of freeway
Muscogee	Midland	9.812	15.791		US 27 Alt. / SR 85 – Manchester, Columbus	Interchange
Muscogee	Midland	11.367	18.293		SR 22 Spur west (Macon Road)	Eastern terminus of SR 22 Spur
Talbot		26.161	42.102		SR 355 south (Doctor Brooks Road) – Buena Vista, Cusseta	Northern terminus of SR 355
Talbot		28.881	46.479		SR 41 south – Buena Vista, Oakland	Western end of SR 41 concurrency
Talbot	Geneva	29.691	47.783		US 80 east / SR 22 east / SR 41 north / SR 96 begins – Talbotton	Eastern end of US 80/SR 22 and SR 41 concurrencies; western terminus of SR 96; western end of SR 96 concurrency
Talbot	Geneva	30.131	48.491		SR 240 east	Western terminus of SR 240
Talbot		30.651	49.328		Old SR 96 east	Former SR 96 east
Talbot		31.221	50.245		Old SR 96 west	Former SR 96 west
Talbot		35.061	56.425		SR 90 west – Talbotton	Western end of SR 90 concurrency
Talbot	Junction City	37.081	59.676		SR 90 east / Buckner Road north – Mauk, Junction City	Eastern end of SR 90 concurrency; southern terminus of Buckner Road
Taylor		48.861	78.634		SR 137 (Charing Road) – Tazewell, Butler	
Taylor	Butler	50.311	80.968		US 19 / SR 3 (South Broad Street) – Ellaville, Butler	
Taylor	Reynolds	59.391	95.581		SR 128 (Winston Street) – Roberta, Oglethorpe	
Flint River		64.481	103.772	Ward Edwards Bridge		
Crawford	No major junctions					
Peach	No major junctions					
Crawford	No major junctions					
Peach		69.091	111.191		SR 49 Conn. begins / SR 96 east – Massee Lane Gardens, Ft Valley	Eastern end of SR 96 concurrency; southern terminus of SR 49 Conn.; southern end of SR 49 Conn. concurrency
Peach		71.411	114.925		US 341 / SR 7 (Hartley Road) – Fort Valley, Roberta	
Peach		73.811	118.787		SR 49 south / SR 49 Conn. ends – Fort Valley	Eastern terminus of SR 49 Conn.; eastern end of SR 49 Conn. concurrency; western end of SR 49 concurrency
Peach	Powersville	78.791	126.802		SR 247 Conn. east (Robert Ray Parkway) to I-75 – Warner Robins, Robins AFB	Western terminus of SR 247 Conn.; southern terminus of Newell Road; provides access to Navicent Health Medical Center of Peach County
Peach	Byron	82.431	132.660		SR 42 north – Knoxville, Roberta	Southern terminus of SR 42
Peach	Byron	83.641	134.607	149	I-75 south (SR 401 south) / SR 49 north – Valdosta	Eastern end of SR 49 concurrency; western end of I-75/SR 401 concurrency; I-75 exit 149
Crawford	No major junctions					
Bibb		87.677	141.102	153	Sardis Church Road	Coach Billy Henderson Interchange
Bibb		89.719	144.389	155	Hartley Bridge Road	Collector-distributor lanes on westbound exit and eastbound entrance
Bibb		90.497	145.641	156	I-475 north (SR 408 north) – Atlanta	Eastbound exit and westbound entrance; southern terminus of I-475/SR 408
Bibb	Macon	93.984	151.253	160A	US 41 / SR 247 (Pio Nono Avenue) – Warner Robins	Signed as exit 160 eastbound
Bibb	Macon	94.443	151.991	160B	US 41 north / SR 247 north (Pio Nono Avenue North) / Rocky Creek Road	Eastbound entrance; westbound exit; eastbound exit for US 41/SR 247 is via exit 160.
Bibb	Macon	95.934	154.391	162	US 80 / SR 22 (Eisenhower Parkway) – St Farmers Mkt, Central Ga Tech, Macon St College	
Bibb	Macon	96.748	155.701	163	SR 74 west (Mercer University Drive) – Mercer University, Five Star Stadium, Hawkins Arena	Eastern terminus of SR 74
Bibb	Macon	97.938	157.616	164	US 41 Bus. / SR 19 (Forsyth Street) / Hardeman Avenue – Downtown, Macon Museum of Arts and Sciences	
Bibb	Macon	99.156	159.576	165 0	I-16 begins (SR 404 begins) / I-75 north – Atlanta	Eastern end of I-75/SR 401 concurrency; western terminus of I-16/SR 404; western end of I-16/SR 404 concurrency; I-75 exit 165; I-16 exit 0; Major Bobby Jones MD POW–MIA Interchange
Bibb	Macon	100.170	161.208	1A	US 23 / US 129 / SR 49 (Spring Street / SR 11 / SR 19) – Milledgeville, Georgia College	No westbound exit or eastbound entrance from southbound Spring Street
Bibb	Macon	100.537	161.799	1B	SR 22 (Second Street) to US 129 / SR 49 – Macon	Westbound exit only
Bibb	Macon	100.859	162.317	2	I-16 east (SR 404 east) / US 80 west / SR 87 south (M.L. King Jr. Boulevard) – Ga Sports Hall of Fame, Tubman Museum, Georgia College	Eastern end of I-16/SR 404 concurrency; western end of US 80/SR 87 concurrency; Phil Walden Memorial Interchange
Bibb	Macon	101.473	163.305		US 23 north / US 129 Alt. north / SR 19 north (Emery Highway west)	Western end of US 23/US 129 Alt./SR 19 concurrency
Bibb	East Macon	103.763	166.990		US 23 south / US 129 Alt. south / SR 87 south – Cochran	Eastern end of US 23/US 129 Alt. and SR 87 concurrencies; no westbound access to US 23/US 129 Alt./SR 87 south
Bibb	East Macon	104.077	167.496		SR 87 Conn. south (Ocmulgee East Boulevard) / Jeffersonville Road north – Cochran	Northern terminus of SR 87 Conn.; southern terminus of Jeffersonville Road
Bibb	East Macon	105.384	169.599		US 80 east / SR 19 south / SR 57 begins / Hitchcock Road north – Dry Branch, Jeffersonville	Eastern end of US 80/SR 19 concurrency; western terminus of SR 57; western end of SR 57 concurrency; southern terminus of Hitchcock Road
Jones	No major junctions					
Twiggs	No major junctions					
Wilkinson		115.964	186.626		SR 57 east (Maddox Road) – Irwinton	Eastern end of SR 57 concurrency; former western terminus of SR 243; former western end of SR 243 concurrency
Wilkinson		118.704	191.036		SR 18 (Gray Highway) – Jeffersonville, Gray	
Wilkinson	Lake Tchukolaho	122.759	197.561	McCook Bridge		
Wilkinson	Ivey	124.454	200.289		O.L. "Red" Brooks Memorial Bridge	Crossing over Beaver Creek; on city limits of Ivey
Wilkinson		125.304	201.657		Pennington Highway north	Southern terminus of Pennington Highway; former SR 243 north; former eastern end of SR 243 concurrency
Baldwin	No major junctions					
Wilkinson		130.619	210.211		US 441 / SR 29 – Irwinton, Milledgeville	Interchange
Baldwin		132.765	213.665		SR 112 south – Toomsboro, Milledgeville	Northern terminus of SR 112
Baldwin		138.715	223.240		SR 24 north – Sandersville, Milledgeville	Western end of SR 24 concurrency
Washington		144.769	232.983		SR 272 south – Oconee	Northern terminus of SR 272
Washington		155.339	249.994		SR 24 Spur north (Yank Brown Road) / SR 68 west (Tennille–Macon Road) – Sandersville, Tennille	Southern terminus of SR 24 Spur; eastern terminus of SR 68
Washington		156.659	252.118		SR 242 east (West Church Street) – Sandersville, C.D.L. range	Western terminus of SR 242
Washington	Sandersville	160.489	258.282		SR 15 (Sparta Road) – Sandersville, Sparta, Sandersville Historic District	
Washington		162.189	261.018		SR 24 east (Ridge Road) – Louisville	Eastern end of SR 24 concurrency
Washington		171.349	275.759		SR 231 south (Tree Nursery Road) – Davisboro, Wrightsville, Washington State Prison	Northern terminus of SR 231
Ogeechee River		172.821	278.128	Fenn's Bridge		
Jefferson	Grange	175.840	282.987		SR 171 (Grange Road) – Gibson, Warrenton, Louisville, Edge Hill	
Jefferson		185.370	298.324		SR 296 – Louisville, Stapleton	
Jefferson	Wrens	189.420	304.842		US 1 south / US 221 south / SR 4 south / SR 17 south (Jefferson Davis Memorial Highway) – Louisville	Western end of US 1/SR 4, US 221, and SR 17 concurrencies
Jefferson	Wrens	190.601	306.743		SR 17 north (Thomson Highway) / Howard Street east – Thomson	Eastern end of SR 17 concurrency; western terminus of Howard Street
Jefferson	Wrens	190.860	307.159		SR 80 / SR 88 east (Broad Street) to SR 17 / SR 102 – Warrenton, Matthews, Keysville, Waynesboro, Avera, Thomson	Western terminus of SR 88
Jefferson	Wrens	191.847	308.748		US 221 north / SR 47 west – Harlem, Appling	Eastern end of US 221 concurrency; eastern terminus of SR 47; provides access to Wrens Memorial Airport
Brier Creek		198.123	318.848	Floyd L. Norton Memorial Bridge		
Richmond	Blythe	204.453	329.035		SR 88 / Hoods Chapel Road north – Blythe, Hephzibah	Southern terminus of Hoods Chapel Road
Richmond	Augusta	212.271	341.617		Tobacco Road – Fort Gordon, Signal Corps Museum, Bush Field	Interchange
Richmond	Augusta	214.592	345.352		Old Highway 1 south	No access from US 1 north/SR 4 north/SR 540 east/FLF east to Old Highway 1 or vice versa; northern terminus of Old Highway 1; former US 1
Richmond	Augusta	216.338	348.162		I-520 (Bobby Jones Expressway / SR 415) / US 1 north / SR 4 north (Deans Bridge Road)	Eastern terminus; eastern end of US 1/SR 4 concurrency; I-520 exit 5; Henry L. Howard Memorial Interchange
1.000 mi = 1.609 km; 1.000 km = 0.621 mi: Concurrency terminus; Incomplete access

== See also ==
- Geographic data related to Fall Line Freeway at OpenStreetMap
- Savannah River Parkway
- Interstate 3
- Fall line; geographical namesake of the highway
