= Georgia State Route 242 =

State highway in Georgia, United States

State Route 242
- SR 242 highlighted in red

Route information
- Maintained by GDOT
- Length: 25.0 mi (40.2 km)
- Existed: 1946–present

Major junctions
- West end: SR 24 / SR 540 in Sandersville
- SR 231 in Riddleville
- East end: US 221 / US 319 / SR 78 / SR 171 in Bartow

Location
- Country: United States
- State: Georgia
- Counties: Washington, Jefferson

Highway system
- Georgia State Highway System; Interstate; US; State; Special
← SR 241	→ SR 243

State Route 242 (SR 242) is a 25.0-mile-long (40.2 km) east–west state highway located in the central part of the U.S. state of Georgia. It travels through portions of Washington and Jefferson counties.

== Route description ==
SR 242 begins at an intersection with SR 24/SR 540 (Fall Line Freeway) in Sandersville in Washington County. The highway makes a quick turn towards downtown Sandersville as SR 242 Spur continues straight. The highway turns south onto SR 15 in the center of the city. After a 0.6-mile-long (0.97 km) concurrency with SR 15, SR 242 turns east at Riddleville Road. The highway heads out of the city in a southeastern direction. Just before leaving Sandersville, it crosses a Sandersville Railroad line. Farther to the southeast, it crosses a Central of Georgia Railway line. The highway passes Jackson Cemetery before reaching Riddleville, where it intersects SR 231 (Harrison-Riddleville Road to the south and Riddleville-Davisboro Road to the north). After leaving town, SR 242 continues to the southeast, and gradually curves to the east and enters Jefferson County. It continues to the east to meet its eastern terminus, an intersection U.S. Route 221 (US 221)/US 319/SR 78/SR 171 in Bartow.

SR 242 is not part of the National Highway System.

== History ==
SR 242 was established in 1946 along the same alignment as it runs today. In 1950, the section from the western terminus to a point just over halfway to Ridleville was paved. In 1953, the entire length of the highway was paved.

== Major intersections ==
County	Location	mi	km	Destinations	Notes
Washington		0.0	0.0	SR 24 / SR 540 (Fall Line Freeway) – Wrightsville, Sparta, Augusta	
Washington		0.1	0.16	SR 242 Spur south	Northern terminus of SR 242 Spur
Washington	Sandersville	2.9	4.7	SR 15 north (South Harris Street) / East Church Street south – Sparta	Western end of SR 15 concurrency; northern terminus of East Church Street
Washington	Sandersville	3.5	5.6	SR 15 south (South Harris Street) – Tennille	Eastern end of SR 15 concurrency
Washington	Riddleville	13.0	20.9	SR 231 (Harrison–Riddleville Road south / Riddleville–Davisboro Road north) – Harrison, Davisboro	
Jefferson	Bartow	25.0	40.2	US 221 / US 319 / SR 78 / SR 171 – Wrightsville, Louisville, Wadley	
1.000 mi = 1.609 km; 1.000 km = 0.621 mi: Concurrency terminus

== SR 242 Spur ==
State Route 242 Spur
- Location: Southwest of Sandersville
- Length: 2.5 mi (4.0 km)

State Route 242 Spur (Spur 242) is a two-and-a-half-mile-long (4.0 km) spur route of SR 242 west of Sandersville. It is known as North Saffold Road for its entire length.

It begins at an intersection with Kaolin Road and South Saffold Road in the southwestern part of the city near Kaolin Field, an airport serving the city. The highway heads northwest and leaves the city limits. It travels through a forested area and intersecting no paved roads until it curves to the north-northwest to its northern terminus, an intersection with the SR 242 mainline (West Church Street), only one-tenth mile (0.16 km) from the latter's western terminus at SR 24. The road is signed north–south and has a speed limit of 45 miles per hour (70 km/h).

The entire route is in Washington County.

Location	mi	km	Destinations	Notes
Sandersville	0.0	0.0	Kaolin road / South Saffold Road south	Southern terminus of SR 242 Spur; northern terminus of South Saffold Road
	2.5	4.0	SR 242 (West Church Street)	Northern terminus
1.000 mi = 1.609 km; 1.000 km = 0.621 mi
