= Washington County School District (Georgia) =

School district in Georgia (U.S. state)

Address
- 501 Industrial Drive Sandersville, Georgia, 31082-7008; United States
- Coordinates: 32.965850°N 82.802974°W

District information
- Grades: Pre-school - 12
- Superintendent: Dr. Rickey Edmond
- Accreditation(s): Southern Association of Colleges and Schools; Georgia Accrediting Commission

Students and staff
- Enrollment: 3,821
- Faculty: 220

Other information
- Telephone: (478) 552-3981
- Fax: (478) 552-3128
- Website: www.washingtoncountyschoolsga.org

The Washington County School District is a public school district in Washington County, Georgia, United States, based in Sandersville. It serves the communities of Davisboro, Deepstep, Harrison, Oconee, Riddleville, Sandersville, Warthen and Tennille.

== Schools ==
The Washington County School District has one primary/elementary complex, one elementary school, one middle school, and one high school.

=== Elementary schools ===
- Ridge Road Elementary School
- Ridge Road Primary School

=== Middle school ===
- T.J. Elder Middle School

=== High school ===
- Washington County High School
