= Georgia State Route 24 =

State highway in Georgia

State Route 24
- SR 24 highlighted in red

Route information
- Maintained by GDOT
- Length: 221.96 mi (357.21 km)
- Existed: 1919–present

Major junctions
- South end: US 80 / SR 26 in Statesboro
- US 301 / SR 73 near Sylvania; US 25 / SR 56 / SR 80 / SR 121 in Waynesboro; US 1 / US 221 / SR 4 / SR 17 in Louisville; US 441 / SR 22 / SR 29 in Milledgeville; US 129 / US 441 / SR 16 / SR 44 in Eatonton; I-20 / US 278 / SR 12 / SR 83 in Madison
- North end: US 129 / US 441 / US 129 Bus. / US 441 Bus. / SR 15 / SR 24 Bus. north of Watkinsville

Location
- Country: United States
- State: Georgia
- Counties: Bulloch, Screven, Burke, Jefferson, Washington, Baldwin, Putnam, Morgan, Oconee

Highway system
- Georgia State Highway System; Interstate; US; State; Special
← I-24	→ US 25

State Route 24 (SR 24) is a 221.96-mile-long (357.21 km) state highway that travels south-to-north in an S-shaped curve through portions of Bulloch, Screven, Burke, Jefferson, Washington, Baldwin, Putnam, Morgan, and Oconee counties in the east-central part of the U.S. state of Georgia. The highway connects Statesboro with the Watkinsville area, via Waynesboro, Louisville, Sandersville, Milledgeville, Eatonton, and Madison.

SR 24 was originally designated from Statesboro to Millen, on a different path than it currently travels. After it was shifted onto part of its current path, it was gradually extended in both directions. It was also extended from Watkinsville to Athens and then Commerce. The paths of SR 15 and SR 24, between Athens and Commerce, were swapped and then reverted to their original paths.

The portion of the highway between Sandersville and Milledgeville is part of the Fall Line Freeway, a divided highway that spans the state from Columbus to Augusta. The Fall Line Freeway is planned to be incorporated into the proposed eastern extension of Interstate 14 (I-14), a freeway that is currently entirely within Central Texas and may be extended to Augusta.

== Route description ==
=== Statesboro to Waynesboro ===
SR 24 begins at an intersection with US 80/SR 26 (East Northside Drive) in Statesboro, within Bulloch County. The highway travels to the east-northeast on East Main Street and intersects US 301 Byp./SR 73 Byp. (Veterans Memorial Parkway), a bypass around the southern and eastern parts of the city. SR 24 continues to the east-northeast, leaves town, and crosses over the Ogeechee River into Screven County. In Oliver, it intersects SR 17 (Scarsboro Highway). Then, in Newington, it intersects SR 21. In the main part of town, it meets SR 21 Bus., the former routing of SR 21. The highway curves to the northwest and travels through rural areas of the county and has a brief concurrency with US 301/SR 73 (Burton's Ferry Highway) north-northeast of Sylvania. After traveling through Hiltonia, it enters Burke County. In Sardis, it intersects SR 23 (Charles Perry Avenue). The highway continues to the northwest toward Waynesboro. Just before entering town, it intersects US 25 Byp./SR 121 Byp., a bypass around most of the eastern part of town. Approximately 2,000 feet (610 m) later, it enters the city limits of town and intersects US 25/SR 121. The three highways travel concurrently into the main part of town. There, they intersect SR 56/SR 80 (6th Street). At this intersection, SR 24 turns left and begins the westerly part of its routing.

=== Waynesboro to Milledgeville ===
SR 24 follows SR 56/SR 80 to the west-southwest. Just outside the city limits, SR 56 departs to the south-southwest, and then SR 80 splits off to the northwest on George Massey Road. After that, SR 24 travels to the west-southwest and enters Vidette. There, it intersects SR 305 (Railroad Avenue). Shortly after leaving town, it enters Jefferson County. In Louisville. Just inside the city limits is an intersection with US 1/SR 4 (Jefferson Davis Highway). At East 9th Street, SR 24 turns to the right and travels to the northwest. Two blocks later, it intersects US 1 Bus./US 221/SR 4 Bus. (Peachtree Street). At this intersection, SR 24 turns to the left. The four highways travel to the southwest. Then, at East Broad Street, US 1 Bus./SR 4 Bus. splits off to the southeast, while US 221/SR 24 continue to the southwest. At Rocky Comfort Creek, they leave town. About 2,000 feet (610 m) later, SR 171 (Grange Road) joins the concurrency. The three highways cross over the Ogeechee River. Southwest of that crossing, SR 24 splits off to the west and enters Washington County. In Davisboro, it intersects SR 231 (Tree Nursery Road). After a long, gradual curve, the highway travels toward Sandersville. At Ridge Road, just east of the city limits, the road turns to the right and heads north for less than 1 mile (1.6 km). It meets SR 540 and the western terminus of SR 88 (Fall Line Freeway), where it turns left onto SR 540 (Fall Line Freeway). SR 24 and SR 540 act as a bypass of most of the northern part of the city. They enter the city limits and have an intersection with SR 15 (Sparta Road). After that intersection, the highways curve to the southwest. Just over 1 mile (1.6 km) after leaving the city limits it meets the western terminus of SR 242. Then, it has an intersection with both the northern terminus of SR 68 (Tennille–Macon Road) and the southern terminus of SR 24 Spur (Yank Brown Road). After that, they begin curving to the northwest. There, SR 540 (Fall Line Freeway) departs to the northwest. Just before leaving the county, it meets the northern terminus of SR 272. It crosses over Gumm Creek and enters Baldwin County. It travels to the northwest and intersects SR 22 (Sparta Highway). The two highways begin a concurrency to the west. Then, they cross over the Oconee River into Milledgeville. Three blocks east-northeast of Georgia College, they meet the northern terminus of SR 49 (East Hancock Street) and the former northern terminus of SR 112 (South Elbert Street). At Montgomery Street, SR 22/SR 24 turn to the west and skirt along the northern edge of Georgia College. At the northwestern corner of the college, they intersect US 441 Bus./SR 29 Bus. (North Clark Street). At this intersection, US 441 Bus./SR 22/SR 24/SR 29 Bus. begin a concurrency to the west. One block later, US 441 Bus./SR 29 Bus. splits off to the west-southwest on West Montgomery Street, while US 441 Bus./SR 24/SR 29 Bus. travel to the north-northwest. At this intersection, SR 24 begins its northern section.

=== Milledgeville to Watkinsville ===
Farther to the northwest, next to Hatcher Square Mall Shopping Center, the two highways intersect US 441/SR 29 (Roberson Mill Road). At this intersection, US 441 Bus. and SR 29 both meet their northern terminus, and US 441/SR 24 travel to the north-northwest. In fact, the two highways are concurrent for the rest of SR 24's length. Farther to the northwest, they cross over the Little River into Putnam County. In the southern part of Eatonton, they intersect US 129/SR 44 (Gray Road). This intersection also marks the southern terminus of US 441 Bus./SR 24 Bus. (Oak Street). US 129 joins the concurrency for the rest of SR 24's length. Northwest of there, they intersect SR 16 (Monticello Road). The concurrency curves to the northeast and meets the northern terminus of US 441 Bus./SR 24 Bus. (North Jefferson Avenue). On the northern edge of the Oconee National Forest, they meet the northern terminus of what used to be SR 300 (Union Chapel Road NW). Then, they enter Morgan County. The highways continue to the north-northwest and enter Madison. There, they have an interchange with Interstate 20 (I-20). Approximately 2,500 feet (760 m) later, they meet the southern terminus of US 129 Byp./US 441 Byp./SR 24 Byp. (Brooks Pennington Memorial Parkway). About 4,000 feet (1,200 m) later, they meet the southern terminus of SR 24 Spur (Ward Road). Then, US 278/SR 12/SR 83 (Eatonton Highway) join the concurrency next to Walton Park. The concurrency passes Hill Park and reach Washington Street, where SR 83 splits off to the northwest. The highways pass by Madison Municipal Airport and meet the northern terminus of US 129 Byp./US 441 Byp./SR 24 Byp. At this intersection, US 278/SR 12 splits off to the east, while US 129/US 441/SR 24 continue to the north. After leaving town, they pass by Youngblood Lake and cross over the Apalachee River into Oconee County. The concurrency passes by Heritage Park and travels through Bishop. They meet the eastern terminus of SR 186 just north of the city limits. Just before skirting along the western edge of Watkinsville, they meet the southern terminus of US 129 Bus./US 441 Bus./SR 24 Bus. (Macon Highway). The concurrency has an interchange with SR 53 (Experiment Station Road). To the north-northeast, they intersect US 129 Bus./US 441 Bus./SR 15/SR 24 Bus. (Macon Highway). At this intersection, US 129 Bus./US 441 Bus./SR 24 Bus., as well as SR 24, all reach their northern terminus. After here, US 129/US 441, now concurrent with SR 15 travel toward Athens.

=== National Highway System ===
The following portions of SR 24 are part of the National Highway System, a system of routes determined to be the most important for the nation's economy, mobility, and defense:

- The portion concurrent with US 301/SR 73 near Hiltonia
- From SR 88 in Sandersville to SR 49 in Milledgeville
- The entire length of its concurrency with US 441, from Milledgeville to north-northwest of Watkinsville

== History ==
=== 1920s to 1940s ===
SR 24 was established at least as early as 1919 from Waynesboro to SR 12 in Madison. At this time, part of SR 15 was established from SR 45 in Watkinsville to Athens. By the end of September 1921, the path of SR 24, from Waynesboro to Louisville, was shifted northwest to travel north on SR 17 from Louisville to Wrens and then on a sole path from Wrens to Augusta. The former path of SR 24 was redesignated as SR 20. SR 24 was extended slightly to the east on SR 12 in Madison and then north-northwest to SR 15 in Watkinsville. By October 1926, US 1 was designated on SR 24 from Augusta to Louisville. US 129 was designated on SR 24 from Eatonton to Watkinsville and on SR 15 from Watkinsville to Athens. By October 1929, the path of SR 24, from Augusta to Louisville, was reverted to the Waynesboro–Louisville path, replacing SR 20. SR 24's former path, on US 1, was redesignated as part of SR 4. By June 1930, SR 24 was extended south-southeast to SR 21 in Sylvania. In April 1932, it was extended completely concurrent with SR 15 north-northeast to Athens and then on a sole path north-northwest to Commerce. Between November 1932 and May 1933, the southern terminus was truncated to SR 73 north of Sylvania, since SR 73 was extended on this former path into the city. Between November 1946 and February 1948, all of SR 24 that existed at the time was hard surfaced. By April 1949, US 441 was designated on the path of SR 24 from Milledgeville to Commerce. The southern terminus of SR 24 was extended slightly southward on a concurrency with US 301/SR 73 and then to the south-southeast and southwest to SR 21 in Newington.

=== 1950s to 2010s ===
In 1952, an unnumbered road was established from Oliver to Newington. Between the beginning of 1951 and the beginning of 1958, SR 24 was extended to SR 98 northwest of Commerce. Between July 1957 and June 1960, SR 24 was extended on the Oliver–Newington unnumbered road and then southwest to Statesboro. The paths of SR 15 and SR 24, between Athens and Commerce, were swapped, with SR 24 traveling concurrent with US 129 northwest to Jefferson and then on a sole path northeast to Commerce. Between June 1960 and June 1963, the paths of these two highways were swapped back to their original paths. Between June 1963 and the beginning of 1966, the northern terminus of SR 24 was truncated to its current point, north of Watkinsville. At least as early as 1985, the path of US 441 in Milledgeville was slightly shifted to the southwest, completely concurrent with SR 29 in the city. In 1988, a western bypass of Eatonton, designated as SR 826 was proposed from US 129/SR 44 in Warfield to US 129/US 441/SR 24 north of Eatonton. In 1990, a western bypass of Watkinsville, designated as a northern extension of SR 186, was proposed from US 129/US 441/SR 24 north-northeast of Bishop to US 129/US 441/SR 15 in the southern part of Athens. In 1992, US 129/US 441/SR 24 in the Eatonton area was shifted westward, replacing the path of SR 826. The former path was redesignated as US 129 Bus./US 441 Bus./SR 24 Bus. The western bypass of Watkinsville was then proposed as SR 818. Between the beginning of 1987 and the beginning of 1998, the path of US 129/US 441/SR 24 (and SR 15 north of SR 24's northern terminus) was shifted westward, replacing the proposed path of SR 818. The former path was redesignated as US 129 Bus./US 441 Bus./SR 24 Bus. Between the beginning of 1994 and the beginning of 2010, the path of SR 24 in Sandersville was shifted northward, onto SR 88. Its former path was redesignated as part of SR 242.

== Future ==
Parts of SR 24, between Milledgeville and Sandersville, are part of the Fall Line Freeway, and may be included in I-14, that is proposed to connect west-central Texas with Augusta, Georgia.

== Major intersections ==
County	Location	mi	km	Destinations	Notes
Bulloch	Statesboro	0.000	0.000	US 80 / SR 26 (East Northside Drive) – Swainsboro, Savannah	Southern terminus
Bulloch	Statesboro	1.117	1.798	US 301 Byp. (Veterans Memorial Parkway / SR 73 Byp.) – Claxton, Sylvania, East Georgia Regional Medical Center	
Ogeechee River		14.648	23.574	Fred W. Hodges Memorial Bridge; Bulloch–Screven county line	
Screven	Oliver	17.049	27.438	SR 17 (Scarboro Highway) – Millen, Guyton	
Screven	Newington	21.621	34.796	SR 21 – Springfield, Sylvania	
Screven	Newington	22.307	35.900	SR 21 Bus. – Savannah, Sylvania	
Screven		45.581	73.356	US 301 south / SR 73 south (Burton's Ferry Highway) – Sylvania	Southern end of US 301/SR 73 concurrency
Screven		46.245	74.424	US 301 north / SR 73 north (Burton's Ferry Highway) – Allendale	Northern end of US 301/SR 73 concurrency
Burke	Sardis	59.264	95.376	SR 24 Conn. north (Bargeron Avenue)	Southern terminus of SR 23 Conn.
Burke	Sardis	59.347	95.510	SR 23 (Girard Avenue) – Millen, Girard	
Burke		74.823	120.416	US 25 Byp. / SR 121 Byp. (Burke Veterans Parkway) – Millen, Augusta	
Burke	Waynesboro	75.535	121.562	US 25 south / SR 121 south (Old Millen Highway) – Millen	Southern end of US 25/SR 121 concurrency
Burke	Waynesboro	76.485	123.091	US 25 north / SR 121 north (Liberty Street) / SR 56 north / SR 80 east (East 6th Street) – Gracewood, Augusta, McBean, Plant Vogtle, Shell Bluff	Northern end of US 25/SR 121 concurrency; southern end of SR 56 and SR 80 concurrencies
Burke		77.832	125.258	SR 56 south – Midville	Northern end of SR 56 concurrency
Burke		78.047	125.604	SR 80 west (George Massey Road) – Wrens	Northern end of SR 80 concurrency
Burke	Vidette	90.824	146.167	SR 305 (Railroad Avenue) – Midville, Keysville	
Jefferson	Louisville	100.066	161.041	US 1 / SR 4 / SR 17 (Jefferson Davis Highway) – Wadley, Wrens	
Jefferson	Louisville	100.745	162.133	US 1 Bus. north / US 221 north / SR 4 Bus. north (Peachtree Street) – Wrens	Southern end of US 1 Bus./SR 4 Bus. and US 221 concurrencies
Jefferson	Louisville	101.126	162.747	US 1 Bus. south / SR 4 Bus. south (West Broad Street) – Wadley	Northern end of US 1 Bus./SR 4 Bus. concurrency
Jefferson		101.949	164.071	SR 171 north – Grange	Southern end of SR 171 concurrency
Jefferson		104.760	168.595	US 221 south / SR 171 south – Bartow	Northern end of US 221 and SR 171 concurrencies
Washington	Davisboro	113.388	182.480	SR 231 (Tree Nursery Road) – Riddleville	
Washington		124.382	200.173	SR 540 east (Fall Line Freeway east) – Wrens	Southern end of SR 540 concurrency
Washington	Sandersville	126.088	202.919	SR 15 (Sparta Road) – Tennille, Sparta	
Washington		129.924	209.092	SR 242 east (Saffold Road) – Sandersville	Western terminus of SR 242
Washington		131.245	211.218	SR 24 Spur north (Yank Brown Road) / SR 68 south (Tennille–Macon Road) – Sandersville, Tennille	Southern terminus of SR 24 Spur; northern terminus of SR 68
Washington		141.815	228.229	SR 272 south – Oconee	Northern terminus of SR 272
Gumm Creek		142.280	228.977	Washington–Baldwin county line	
Baldwin		147.863	237.962	SR 540 west (Fall Line Freeway west)	Northern end of SR 540 concurrency
Baldwin		152.260	245.039	SR 22 east (Sparta Highway NE) – Sparta	Southern end of SR 22 concurrency
Baldwin	Milledgeville	155.800	250.736	Bobby Parham Bridge over the Oconee River at eastern city limits	
Baldwin	Milledgeville	156.348	251.618	SR 49 north (East Hancock Street) / South Elbert Street south – Georgia Veterans Memorial Cemetery, Central State Hospital, Oconee River Greenway and Riverwalk	Northern terminus of SR 49; former SR 22 Conn./SR 24 Conn.; former northern terminus of SR 112
Baldwin	Milledgeville	157.051	252.749	US 441 Bus. south / SR 29 Bus. south (North Clarke Street) – Irwinton, Dublin	Southern end of US 441 Bus./SR 29 Bus. concurrency
Baldwin	Milledgeville	157.149	252.907	SR 22 west (West Montgomery Street) – Gray	Northern end of SR 22 concurrency
Baldwin	Milledgeville	159.405	256.537	US 441 south / US 441 Bus. ends / SR 29 Bus. ends / SR 29 south (Roberson Mill Road) / Dunlap Street east – Eatonton, Madison, Georgia Veterans Memorial Cemetery, Central State Hospital	Northern end of US 441 Bus./SR 29 Bus. concurrency; northern terminus of US 441 Bus./SR 29 Bus. and SR 29; southern end of US 441 concurrency; western terminus of Dunlap Street
Little River		165.469	266.297	Baldwin–Putnam county line	
Putnam		165.955	267.079	Donald Ridley Bridge over Lake Sinclair	
Putnam	Eatonton	175.379	282.245	US 129 south / SR 44 north (Gray Road) / US 129 Bus. / US 441 Bus. north / SR 24 Bus. north (Oak Street) – Gray	Southern end of US 129 concurrency; southern terminus of US 129 Bus./US 441 Bus./SR 24 Bus.
Putnam	Eatonton	177.529	285.705	SR 16 (Monticello Road) – Monticello, Sparta	
Putnam	Eatonton	179.861	289.458	US 129 Bus. south / US 441 Bus. south / SR 24 Bus. south (North Jefferson Avenue)	Northern terminus of US 129 Bus./US 441 Bus./SR 24 Bus.
Morgan	Madison	197.532	317.897	I-20 (Carl Sanders Highway / SR 402) – Atlanta, Augusta	I-20/SR 402 exit 114
Morgan	Madison	198.223	319.009	US 129 Byp. north / US 441 Byp. north / SR 24 Byp. north (Madison Bypass) – Watkinsville, Athens	Southern terminus of US 129 Byp./US 441 Byp./SR 24 Byp.
Morgan	Madison	199.219	320.612	SR 24 Spur north (Ward Road)	Southern terminus of SR 24 Spur
Morgan	Madison	199.732	321.437	US 278 west / SR 12 west / SR 83 south (Eatonton Highway) – Covington, Monticello	Southern end of US 278/SR 12 and SR 83 concurrencies
Morgan	Madison	200.567	322.781	SR 83 north (Washington Street) – Monroe	Northern end of SR 83 concurrency
Morgan		201.984	325.062	US 129 Byp. south / US 441 Byp. south / SR 24 Byp. south (Madison Bypass) / US 278 east / SR 12 east – Greensboro, Eatonton	Northern end of US 278/SR 12 concurrency; northern terminus of US 129 Byp./US 441 Byp./SR 24 Byp.
Apalachee River		209.777	337.603	Morgan–Oconee county line	
Oconee	Bishop	217.611	350.211	SR 186 west (High Shoals Road) – Good Hope	Eastern terminus of SR 186
Oconee		219.406	353.100	US 129 Bus. north / US 441 Bus. north / SR 24 Bus. north (Macon Highway)	Southern terminus of US 129 Bus./US 441 Bus./SR 24 Bus.
Oconee	Watkinsville	221.141	355.892	SR 53 (Experiment Station Road) – Winder, Watkinsville	
Oconee		221.959	357.208	US 129 north / US 441 north / SR 15 (Watkinsville Bypass) / US 129 Bus. south / US 441 Bus. south / SR 24 Bus. south (Macon Highway) – Athens, Watkinsville, Greensboro	Northern terminus; northern end of US 129 and US 441 concurrencies; northern terminus of US 129 Bus./US 441 Bus./SR 24 Bus.
1.000 mi = 1.609 km; 1.000 km = 0.621 mi: Concurrency terminus

== Special routes ==
=== Sardis connector route ===
State Route 24 Connector
- Location: Sardis
- Length: 0.12 mi (190 m)

State Route 24 Connector (SR 24 Conn.) is a connector route of SR 24 that exists completely within the city limits of Sardis in the eastern part of Burke County. It also serves as a truck route connecting SR 24 with SR 23.

The entire route is in Sardis, Burke County.

mi	km	Destinations	Notes
0.000	0.000	SR 24 (Charles Perry Avenue) – Waynesboro, Sylvania	Southern terminus
0.118	0.190	SR 23 (Girard Avenue) – Millen, Girard	Northern terminus
1.000 mi = 1.609 km; 1.000 km = 0.621 mi

=== Davisboro spur route ===
State Route 24 Spur
- Location: Davisboro
- Existed: 1940–1943

State Route 24 Spur (SR 24 Spur) was a spur route of SR 24 that existed entirely within the east-central part of Washington County. Its entire route was inside the city limits of Davisboro. Between October 1940 and January 1941, it was established from downtown Davisboro to SR 24 in the northern part of the city. In 1943, its entire length was redesignated as part of SR 231.

The entire route was in Davisboro, Washington County.

mi	km	Destinations	Notes
		Downtown Davisboro	Southern terminus
		SR 24	Northern terminus
1.000 mi = 1.609 km; 1.000 km = 0.621 mi

=== Sandersville spur route ===
State Route 24 Spur
- Location: Sandersville
- Existed: 1993–2009

State Route 24 Spur (SR 24 Spur) was a spur route of SR 24 that existed in the central part of Washington County. Most of the highway was within the city limits of Sandersville. Between the beginning of 1984 and the beginning of 1994, it was established from SR 24 west of the city to SR 15 in the southern part of the city. By the beginning of 2010, when SR 24 in Sandersville was shifted to the northern part of the city and was redesignated as part of SR 242, SR 24 Spur was redesignated as SR 242 Spur.

The entire route was in Washington County.

Location	mi	km	Destinations	Notes
			SR 24	Western terminus
Sandersville			SR 15	Eastern terminus
1.000 mi = 1.609 km; 1.000 km = 0.621 mi

=== Washington County spur route ===
State Route 24 Spur
- Location: West of Sandersville
- Length: 2.7 mi (4.3 km)
- Existed: 1987–present

State Route 24 Spur (SR 24 Spur) is a 2.7-mile-long (4.3 km) spur route of SR 24 that exists entirely within the central part of Washington County. Its entire route is west of Sandersville, except for its northern terminus, which is on the northwestern edge of the city limits. It is known as Yank Brown Road for its entire length.

It begins at an intersection with the SR 24 mainline and SR 540 (West Church Street/Fall Line Freeway) west of Sandersville. This intersection also marks the northern terminus of SR 68 (Tennille–Macon Road). The highway travels to the north-northeast and meets its northern terminus, an intersection with Deepstep Road on the northwestern edge of Sandersville's city limits.

SR 24 Spur is not part of the National Highway System, a system of routes determined to be the most important for the nation's economy, mobility, and defense.

At least as early as 1951, Yank Brown Road was established. In 1987, it was designated as SR 24 Spur.

The entire route is in Washington County.

Location	mi	km	Destinations	Notes
	0.0	0.0	SR 24 (West Church Street) / SR 540 (Fall Line Freeway) / SR 68 south (Tennille–Macon Road) – Sandersville, Milledgeville, Tennille, Augusta	Southern terminus of SR 24 Spur; northern terminus of SR 68
Sandersville	2.7	4.3	Deepstep Road – Deepstep, Sandersville	Northern terminus
1.000 mi = 1.609 km; 1.000 km = 0.621 mi

=== Milledgeville connector route ===
State Route 24 Connector
- Location: Milledgeville
- Existed: 1971–1995

State Route 24 Connector (SR 24 Conn.) was a connector route of SR 24 that existed entirely within the city limits of Milledgeville. In 1971, it and SR 22 Conn. was established from US 441 (Wayne Street) and SR 29, which took on the Franklin Street name, east-northeast on Franklin Street to SR 112 (Elbert Street), and then north-northwest on Elbert Street to SR 22/SR 24/SR 49. Between the beginning of 1986 and the beginning of 1996, US 441/SR 29 were shifted west of the city. The former path was redesignated as US 441 Bus./SR 243. At this time, both SR 22 Conn. and SR 24 Conn. were decommissioned. The Elbert Street portion was redesignated as a northern extension of SR 112.

The entire route was in Milledgeville, Baldwin County.

mi	km	Destinations	Notes
		US 441 (Wayne Street) / SR 29 (Franklin Street) / SR 22 Conn. begins	Southern end of SR 22 Conn. concurrency; southern terminus of SR 22 Conn. and SR 24 Conn.
		SR 112 south (Elbert Street)	Northern terminus of SR 112
		SR 22 / SR 24 (Elbert Street / Hancock Street) / SR 49 south (Hancock Street) / SR 22 Conn. ends	Northern end of SR 22 Conn. concurrency; northern terminus of SR 22 Conn., SR 24 Conn., and SR 49
1.000 mi = 1.609 km; 1.000 km = 0.621 mi: Concurrency terminus

=== Eatonton business loop ===
State Route 24 Business
- Location: Eatonton
- Length: 3.8 mi (6.1 km)
- Existed: 1992–present

State Route 24 Business (SR 24 Bus.) is a 3.8-mile-long (6.1 km) business route of SR 24 that exists entirely within the city limits of Eatonton in the central part of Putnam County.

It begins at an intersection with US 129/US 441/SR 24/SR 44 in the southern part of Eatonton. At this intersection, SR 24 Bus. travels in a northerly direction concurrent with SR 44, along with US 129 Bus./US 441 Bus., which begin at this intersection, as well. The four highways curve to the north-northwest along Oak Street and pass the Uncle Remus Golf Course. They curve to the northeast before curving again to the north-northwest. At East Sumter Street, SR 44 splits off to the northeast, concurrent with SR 16. SR 16 joins the concurrency for one block and then splits off to the southwest on West Marion Street. US 129 Bus./US 441 Bus./SR 24 Bus. continue to the north-northwest and curve to the north. Just before intersecting US 129/US 441/SR 24 in the northern part of town, the concurrency has one final curve to the northwest. At US 129/US 441/SR 24, all three highways meet their northern terminus.

SR 24 Bus. is not part of the National Highway System, a system of roadways important to the nation's economy, defense, and mobility.

The roadway that would eventually become SR 24 Bus. was established at least as early as 1919 as part of SR 24 on this path. Between September 1921 and October 1926, US 129 was designated on the path of SR 24 from Eatonton to Watkinsville. In 1930, the portion of SR 24 in the southern part of Eatonton had a "completed hard surface". By the beginning of 1932, the portion of the highway in the northern part of the city also had a completed hard surface. By April 1949, US 441 was designated on the path of SR 24 from Milledgeville to Commerce. In 1988, a western bypass of Eatonton, designated as SR 826 was proposed from US 129/SR 44 in Warfield to US 129/US 441/SR 24 north of Eatonton. In 1992, US 129/US 441/SR 24 in the Eatonton area was shifted westward, replacing the path of SR 826. The former path was redesignated as US 129 Bus./US 441 Bus./SR 24 Bus.

The entire route is in Eatonton, Putnam County.

mi	km	Destinations	Notes
0.0	0.0	US 129 / SR 44 west (Gray Highway) / US 441 / SR 24 (Milledgeville Road / West Bypass) / US 129 Bus. begins / US 441 Bus. begins – Milledgeville, Madison, Gray	Southern end of US 129 Bus./US 441 Bus. and SR 44 concurrencies; southern terminus of US 129 Bus./US 441 Bus./SR 24 Bus.
2.2	3.5	SR 16 east / SR 44 east (East Sumter Street) – Sparta, Greensboro	Northern end of SR 44 concurrency; southern end of SR 16 concurrency
2.3	3.7	SR 16 west (West Marion Street) – Monticello	Northern end of SR 16 concurrency
3.8	6.1	US 129 / US 441 / SR 24 (West Bypass / Madison Road) / US 129 Bus. ends / US 441 Bus. ends / Putnam Drive west – Milledgeville, Madison	Northern end of US 129 Bus./US 441 Bus. concurrency; northern terminus of US 129 Bus./US 441 Bus./SR 24 Bus.; eastern terminus of Putnam Drive
1.000 mi = 1.609 km; 1.000 km = 0.621 mi: Concurrency terminus

=== Madison bypass route ===
State Route 24 Bypass
- Location: Madison
- Length: 4.2 mi (6.8 km)
- Existed: 1992–present

State Route 24 Bypass (SR 24 Byp.) is a 4.2-mile-long (6.8 km) bypass route of SR 24 that exists entirely within the central part of Morgan County. Parts of the highway are inside the city limits of Madison. It is named Madison Bypass, and is entirely concurrent with US 129 Byp. and US 441 Byp., as well as Us 278 Truck and SR 12 Truck. The bypass is also signed as US 441 Truck and SR 24 Truck.

It begins at an intersection with US 129/US 441/SR 24 in the southern part of Madison. At this intersection, which is also the eastern terminus of Lions Club Road, SR 24 Byp. travels in a northeasterly direction, concurrent with US 129 Byp./US 278 Truck/US 441 Byp./US 441 Truck/SR 24 Truck. The five highways leave the city limits of Madison and then briefly re-enter it. They curve to the north-northeast and re-enter the city limits again. Then, they skirt along the western edge of Heritage Park. After that, they curve to the north-northwest and curve to the north-northeast and leave the city limits again and meet their northern terminus, an intersection with US 129/US 278/US 441/SR 12/SR 24, just north of the city.

SR 24 Byp. is not part of the National Highway System, a system of roadways important to the nation's economy, defense, and mobility.

In 1988, US 129 Byp./US 441 Byp./SR 24 Byp. was proposed from US 129/US 441/SR 24 south-southwest of the city to US 129/US 441/SR 24 and US 278/SR 12 northeast of it. In 1992, the bypass routes were completed.

The entire route is in Morgan County.

Location	mi	km	Destinations	Notes
Madison	0.0	0.0	US 129 / US 278 Truck west / US 441 / SR 12 Truck west / SR 24 (Eatonton Road) / US 129 Byp. begins / US 441 Byp. begins / US 441 Truck begins / SR 24 Truck begins / Lions Club Road west – Eatonton, Madison	Southern end of US 129 Byp./US 278 Truck/US 441 Byp./US 441 Truck/SR 12 Truck/SR 24 Truck concurrency; southern terminus of US 129 Byp./US 441 Byp./US 441 Truck/SR 24 Byp./SR 24 Truck; eastern terminus of Lions Club Road
	4.2	6.8	US 129 / US 441 / SR 24 (North Main Street / Athens Highway) / US 278 / SR 12 (North Main Street / Greensboro Road) / US 129 Byp. ends / US 441 Byp. ends / US 441 Truck ends / SR 24 Truck ends – Madison, Watkinsville, Athens, Greensboro	Northern end of US 129 Byp./US 278 Truck/US 441 Byp./US 441 Truck/SR 12 Truck/SR 24 Truck concurrency; northern terminus of US 129 Byp./US 441 Byp./US 441 Truck/SR 24 Byp./SR 24 Truck; eastern terminus of US 278 Truck/SR 12 Truck
1.000 mi = 1.609 km; 1.000 km = 0.621 mi: Concurrency terminus

=== Madison spur route ===
State Route 24 Spur
- Location: Madison
- Length: 0.4 mi (640 m)
- Existed: 1946–present

State Route 24 Spur (SR 24 Spur) is a 0.4-mile-long (0.64 km) spur route of SR 24 that exists entirely within the central part of Madison in the central part of Morgan County. It is known as Ward Road for its entire length. It travels concurrently with US 278 Truck/SR 12 Truck for its entire length.

It begins at an intersection with US 129/US 441/SR 24 (Eatonton Road). Here, US 278 Truck/SR 12 Truck leave a concurrency with US 129/US 441/SR 24 and begin one with SR 24 Spur. The three highways travel in a northwestern curve and meets SR 24 Spur's northern terminus and US 278 Truck/SR 12 Truck's western terminus, an intersection with US 278/SR 12/SR 83.

SR 24 Spur is not part of the National Highway System, a system of roadways important to the nation's economy, defense, and mobility.

Between the beginning of 1945 and November 1946, SR 24 Spur was established on its current path.

The entire route is in Madison, Morgan County.

mi	km	Destinations	Notes
0.0	0.0	US 129 / US 278 Truck east / US 441 / SR 12 Truck east / SR 24 (Eatonton Road) – Eatonton, Athens	Southern end of US 278 Truck/SR 12 Truck concurrency; southern terminus
0.4	0.64	US 278 / SR 12 / SR 83 (Monticello Road / Eatonton Highway) / US 278 Truck ends / SR 12 Truck ends – Covington, Greensboro, Monticello, Monroe	Northern end of US 278 Truck/SR 12 Truck concurrency; northern terminus of SR 24 Spur; western terminus of US 278 Truck/SR 12 Truck
1.000 mi = 1.609 km; 1.000 km = 0.621 mi

=== Watkinsville business loop ===
State Route 24 Business
- Location: Watkinsville
- Length: 3.0 mi (4.8 km)
- Existed: 1997–present

State Route 24 Business (SR 24 Bus.) exists entirely within the central part of Oconee County. Most of the route is inside the city limits of Watkinsville.

It begins at an intersection with US 129/US 441/SR 24 just southwest of Watkinsville. At this intersection, SR 24 Bus. travels in a northeasterly direction on Macon Highway, concurrent with US 129 Bus./US 441 Bus., which begin at this intersection, as well. The three highways enter the city limits and parallel a Norfolk Southern Railway line for about 2 miles (3.2 km). The concurrency curves to the north and very gradually bends to the north-northwest and intersect SR 15 (Greensboro Highway), which joins the concurrency. At Experiment Station Road, they meet the eastern terminus of SR 53. The highways curve to a nearly northern routing and cross over Calls Creek. Then, they leave the city limits and curve to the northwest and intersect US 129/US 441/SR 24, where US 129 Bus./US 441 Bus./SR 24 Bus. meet their northern terminus, and SR 15 turns to the right onto US 129/US 441/SR 24 north.

SR 24 Bus. is not part of the National Highway System, a system of roadways important to the nation's economy, defense, and mobility.

The roadway that would eventually become SR 24 Bus. was established at least as early as 1919 as part of SR 15. By October 1926, US 129 was designated on SR 24 from Eatonton to Watkinsville and on SR 15 from Watkinsville to Athens. In April 1932, the portion of US 129/SR 15 in the northern part of Watkinsville had a "completed hard surface". SR 24 was extended completely concurrent with SR 15 north-northeast to Athens. In June 1933, the portion of US 129/SR 24 in the southern part of Watkinsville also had a completed hard surface. By April 1949, US 441 was designated on the path of SR 24 from Milledgeville to Commerce.

Between June 1963 and the beginning of 1966, the northern terminus of SR 24 was truncated to its current point, north of Watkinsville. In 1990, a western bypass of Watkinsville, designated as a northern extension of SR 186, was proposed from US 129/US 441/SR 24 north-northeast of Bishop to US 129/US 441/SR 15 in the southern part of Athens. In 1992, the western bypass of Watkinsville was then proposed as SR 818. Between the beginning of 1987 and the beginning of 1998, the path of US 129/US 441/SR 24 (and SR 15 north of SR 24's northern terminus) was shifted westward, replacing the proposed path of SR 818. The former path was redesignated as US 129 Bus./US 441 Bus./SR 24 Bus.

The entire route is in Oconee County.

Location	mi	km	Destinations	Notes
	0.0	0.0	US 129 / US 441 / SR 24 (Macon Road / Watkinsville Bypass) / US 129 Bus. begins / US 441 Bus. begins – Madison, Athens	Southern end of US 129 Bus./US 441 Bus. concurrency; southern terminus of US 129 Bus./US 441 Bus./SR 24 Bus.
Watkinsville	1.5	2.4	SR 15 south (Greensboro Highway) – Greensboro	Southern end of SR 15 concurrency
Watkinsville	1.9	3.1	SR 53 west (Experiment Station Road) – Winder, Oconee County Civic Center	Eastern terminus of SR 53
	3.0	4.8	US 129 / US 441 / SR 15 north / SR 24 south (Watkinsville Bypass) / US 129 Bus. ends / US 441 Bus. ends – Madison, Athens	Northern end of US 129 Bus./US 441 Bus. and SR 15 concurrencies; northern terminus of SR 24 and US 129 Bus./US 441 Bus./SR 24 Bus.
1.000 mi = 1.609 km; 1.000 km = 0.621 mi: Concurrency terminus

=== Commerce spur route ===
State Route 24 Spur
- Location: Commerce
- Existed: 1960–1965

State Route 24 Spur (SR 24 Spur) was a spur route of SR 24 that existed completely within the city limits of Commerce, in the northeastern part of Jackson County. Between July 1957 and June 1960, it was established on the path of US 441/SR 15/SR 98 from SR 24 in the southeastern part of the city to SR 24/SR 98 in the central part of the city. Between June 1960 and June 1963, the paths of SR 15 and SR 24, between Athens and Commerce, were swapped. Between June 1963 and the beginning of 1966, it was decommissioned.

This table shows the 1963-1965 route. The entire route was in Commerce, Jackson County.

mi	km	Destinations	Notes
		US 441 south / SR 24 / SR 98 south	Southern end of US 441/SR 98 concurrency; southern terminus
		SR 326 north	Southern terminus of SR 326
		US 441 north / SR 15 / SR 24 Conn. north / SR 98 north	Northern end of US 441/SR 98 concurrency; northern terminus of SR 24 Spur; southern terminus of SR 24 Conn.
1.000 mi = 1.609 km; 1.000 km = 0.621 mi: Concurrency terminus

=== Commerce connector route ===
State Route 24 Connector
- Location: Commerce
- Existed: 1960–1965

State Route 24 Connector (SR 24 Conn.) was a connector route of SR 24 that existed completely within the city limits of Commerce, in the northeastern part of Jackson County. Between July 1957 and June 1960, it was established on the path of SR 98 from US 441/SR 15/SR 24 in the central part of the city to SR 59 Conn. in the northwestern part of the city. Between June 1960 and June 1963, the paths of SR 15 and SR 24, between Athens and Commerce, were swapped, with SR 24 rerouted in the city. Between June 1963 and the beginning of 1966, SR 24 Conn. was decommissioned.

The entire route was in Commerce, Jackson County.

mi	km	Destinations	Notes
		US 441 / SR 15 / SR 24 Spur south / SR 98 south	Southern end of SR 98 concurrency; southern terminus of SR 24 Conn.; northern terminus of SR 24 Spur
		SR 59 Conn. north / SR 98 north	Northern end of SR 98 concurrency; northern terminus of SR 24 Conn.; southern terminus of SR 59 Conn.
1.000 mi = 1.609 km; 1.000 km = 0.621 mi: Concurrency terminus

== See also ==
- Central Savannah River Area
