= Georgia State Route 88 =

State highway in Georgia, US

State Route 88
- SR 88 highlighted in red

Route information
- Maintained by GDOT
- Length: 53.2 mi (85.6 km)

Major junctions
- West end: SR 24 / SR 540 east of Sandersville
- US 1 / US 221 / SR 4 / SR 17 in Wrens; SR 80 in Wrens
- East end: US 25 / SR 121 in Hephzibah

Location
- Country: United States
- State: Georgia
- Counties: Washington, Jefferson, Burke, Richmond

Highway system
- Georgia State Highway System; Interstate; US; State; Special
← SR 87	→ SR 89

State Route 88 (SR 88) is a 53.2-mile-long (85.6 km) state highway that travels southwest-to-northeast through portions of Washington, Jefferson, Burke, and Richmond counties in the east-central part of the U.S. state of Georgia. The highway connects the Sandersville area with Hephzibah, via Wrens, with a brief portion in Augusta.

From its western terminus east of Sandersville to Wrens, SR 88 is part of the Fall Line Freeway, a highway that connects Columbus and Augusta, partially as a truck route, and is signed as SR 540. It may also be incorporated into the proposed eastern extension of Interstate 14 (I-14), an Interstate Highway that is currently entirely within Central Texas and may be extended to Augusta.

== Route description ==
SR 88 begins at an intersection with SR 24/SR 540 (SR 24 is known as Ridge Road south of this intersection; SR 24 and SR 540 is part of the Fall Line Freeway west of here), just east of Sandersville, in the central part of Washington County. At this intersection, it begins a concurrency with SR 540 (and the Fall Line Freeway). The two highways head northeast to an intersection with the northern terminus of SR 231 and the southern terminus of Tree Nursery Road, north-northwest of Davisboro. This is just before the highways cross over the Ogeechee River on the Fenns Bridge into Jefferson County. Not too far into the county is an intersection with SR 171 (Grange Road). South of Stapleton is SR 296. SR 88 and SR 540 continue to the northwest, until they meet US 1/US 221/SR 4/SR 17 (Jefferson Davis Memorial Highway) in the extreme southwestern part of Wrens. The six highways travel concurrently to the north-northeast into the main part of the city. At an intersection with the western terminus of Howard Street and the southern terminus of Thomson Highway, SR 17 departs to the north-northwest onto Thomson Highway. A few blocks later, they intersect SR 80. At this intersection, SR 80/SR 88 head to the east. At Waynesboro Road, SR 80 departs to the south-southeast, while SR 88 continues its east-northeastern routing. Then, it gradually curves to a near-due-eastern direction, before heading southeast at Matthews. After that, it heads east-northeast, and then northeast, until it enters Burke County, just before it meets SR 305. Here, it heads north-northeast, and straddles the county line for a short distance, into Keysville. The highway briefly heads north-northwest before it turns to the northeast and enters Richmond County and the city limits of Augusta. After a brief portion in the city, it enters the city of Blythe. Here, the path of SR 88 and that of US 1/SR 4/SR 540 come very close together, forming the shape of the letter "K", but with a very short horizontal line connecting its upright parts. The two highway paths do not actually intersect, as there is a very brief connecting road between them. SR 88 curves to the east-northeast and re-enters Augusta. It curves to the east-southeast and enters Hephzibah. On the northeastern edge of the city, on the Hephzibah–Augusta line, it meets its eastern terminus, an intersection with US 25/SR 121 (Peach Orchard Road).

The only portion of SR 88 that is part of the National Highway System, a system of routes determined to be the most important for the nation's economy, mobility, and defense, is the entire SR 540 concurrency, from east of Sandersville to Wrens.

== History ==
SR 88 was built in 1931 in southern Richmond County. In 1939, all of SR 88 was paved. In 1940 SR 88 was extended to Wrens via the Burke-Jefferson county line. In 1966, SR 88 was extended again to Sandersville via Grange. Reassurance shields for SR 88 were removed on the Fall Line Freeway in June 2020.

== Future ==
The route of SR 88 is being absorbed into the Fall Line Freeway, which is planned to extend from the Alabama state line in Columbus to an interchange with I-20 and I-520 in Augusta. It could also become part of the future I-14.

== Major intersections ==
County	Location	mi	km	Destinations	Notes
Washington		0.0	0.0	SR 24 (Fall Line Freeway west / Ridge Road south) / SR 540 west (Fall Line Freeway west) – Milledgeville, Davisboro, Louisville	Western end of SR 540 concurrency; western terminus
Washington		9.1	14.6	SR 231 south / Tree Nursery Road north – Davisboro, Wrightsville, Washington State Prison	Northern terminus of SR 231; southern terminus of Tree Nursery Road
Ogeechee River		10.5 10.6	16.9 17.1	Fenns Bridge	
Jefferson	Grange	13.6	21.9	SR 171 (Grange Road) – Edge Hill, Gibson, Warrenton, Louisville	
Jefferson		23.1	37.2	SR 296 – Louisville, Stapleton	
Jefferson	Wrens	27.1	43.6	US 1 south / US 221 south / SR 4 south / SR 17 south (Jefferson Davis Memorial Highway) – Louisville	Western end of US 1/US 221/SR 4 and SR 17 concurrencies
Jefferson	Wrens	28.3	45.5	SR 17 north (Thomson Highway) / Howard Street east – Thomson	Eastern end of SR 17 concurrency; western terminus of Howard Street
Jefferson	Wrens	28.6	46.0	US 1 north / US 221 north / SR 4 north (Main Street) / SR 540 east (Fall Line Freeway) – Augusta, Aiken SC, Harlem, Appling SR 80 west (Broad Street) to SR 17 / SR 102 – Warrenton, Stapleton, Gibson, Avera, Thomson	Eastern end of US 1/US 221/SR 4 and SR 540 concurrencies; western end of SR 80 concurrency; US 1/US 221/SR 4/SR 540 provide access to Wrens Municipal Airport.
Jefferson	Wrens	29.1	46.8	SR 80 east (Waynesboro Road) – Waynesboro	Eastern end of SR 80 concurrency
Burke		38.3	61.6	SR 305 south – Midville	Northern terminus of SR 305
Richmond	Blythe	44.9	72.3	To US 1 (SR 4 / SR 540) – Wrens, Augusta	
Richmond	Hephzibah–Augusta line	53.2	85.6	US 25 / SR 121 (Peach Orchard Road) – Waynesboro, Augusta	Eastern terminus
1.000 mi = 1.609 km; 1.000 km = 0.621 mi: Concurrency terminus
