= Georgia State Route 171 =

State highway in Georgia, United States

State Route 171
- Georgia State Route 171 highlighted in red

Route information
- Maintained by GDOT
- Length: 76.9 mi (123.8 km)

Major junctions
- South end: US 221 / SR 56 northeast of Soperton
- US 80 / SR 26 northeast of Adrian; US 319 / SR 78 in Bartow; US 221 / SR 24 southwest of Louisville
- North end: US 278 Byp. / SR 12 Byp. in Warrenton

Location
- Country: United States
- State: Georgia
- Counties: Treutlen, Emanuel, Johnson, Jefferson, Glascock, Warren

Highway system
- Georgia State Highway System; Interstate; US; State; Special
← SR 170	→ SR 172

State Route 171 (SR 171) is a 76.9-mile-long (123.8 km) state highway that runs south-to-north through portions of Treutlen, Emanuel, Johnson, Jefferson, Glascock, and Warren counties in the east-central part of the U.S. state of Georgia.

== Route description ==
SR 171 begins at an intersection with US 221/SR 56, northeast of Soperton, in Treutlen County. US 221/SR 171 run concurrent for just over half of SR 171's length. A little ways north of that point, the two highways cross into Emanuel County and then, the Ohoopee River. They meet US 80/SR 26. They curve to the northwest, then curve back to the northeast. After a brief entrance into Johnson County, and a longer re-entrance to Emanuel County, the concurrency enters Johnson County again. They continue to the northeast and then curve to the northwest to the town of Kite, where they meet SR 57. They continue to the north and begin a gradual curve to the northeast to enter Jefferson County. The routes meet US 319/SR 78, which join the concurrency. Just before entering Bartow, they intersect SR 242. In town, US 319/SR 78 depart to the east. US 221/SR 171 continue to the north, until they meet SR 24, which joins the concurrency. The three highways head to the northeast until a point just southwest of Louisville. There, SR 171 departs to the northwest. Farther to the northwest is SR 88 (Jefferson Davis Memorial Highway) and SR 540 (Fall Line Freeway). It continues to the northwest to enter Glascock County. It curves to the northeast, until it enters the town of Gibson. There, it meets SR 102. The road heads north and curves to the northwest to enter Warren County. SR 171 continues to the northwest until it meets its northern terminus, an intersection with US 278 Bypass/SR 12 Bypass, in Warrenton.

== Major intersections ==
County	Location	mi	km	Destinations	Notes
Treutlen		0.0	0.0	US 221 south / SR 56 – Soperton, Swainsboro	Southern terminus
Emanuel		2.8	4.5	Ohoopee River	
Emanuel		6.9	11.1	US 80 / SR 26	
Johnson	No major junctions				
Emanuel	No major junctions				
Johnson	Kite	17.1	27.5	SR 57 (Kite Road) – Wrightsville, Swainsboro	
Jefferson		20.1	32.3	Little Ohoopee River	
Jefferson		27.4	44.1	US 319 south / SR 78 west	Southern end of US 319/SR 78 concurrency
Jefferson		30.7	49.4	SR 242 west (Minor Drive) – Sandersville	Eastern terminus of SR 242
Jefferson	Bartow	31.0	49.9	US 319 north / SR 78 east (Wadley Road)	Northern end of US 319/SR 78 concurrency
Jefferson		38.0	61.2	SR 24 west – Sandersville	Southern end of SR 24 concurrency
Jefferson		39.5	63.6	Ogeechee River	
Jefferson		40.8	65.7	US 221 north / SR 24 east	Northern end of US 221 & SR 24 concurrencies
Jefferson		50.9	81.9	SR 540 – Sandersville, Wrens, Augusta	
Glascock	Gibson	64.1	103.2	SR 102 west (East Main Street) – Mitchell	Southern end of SR 102 concurrency
Glascock	Gibson	64.1	103.2	SR 102 east (East Main Street) – Wrens	Northern end of SR 102 concurrency
Warren	Warrenton	76.9	123.8	US 278 Byp. / SR 12 Byp. (Legion Road)	Northern terminus
1.000 mi = 1.609 km; 1.000 km = 0.621 mi: Concurrency terminus
