= Georgia State Route 78 =

State highway in Georgia, United States

State Route 78
- SR 78 highlighted in red

Route information
- Maintained by GDOT
- Length: 59.6 mi (95.9 km)

Major junctions
- South end: SR 46 in Soperton
- US 221 / SR 15 / SR 56 in Soperton; I-16 north of Soperton; SR 86 south of Adrian; US 80 / SR 26 in Adrian; US 319 / SR 15 / SR 31 / SR 57 in Wrightsville; US 221 / SR 171 south of Bartow; US 1 Bus. / SR 4 Bus. in Wadley; US 1 / SR 4 in Wadley
- East end: SR 17 northwest of Midville

Location
- Country: United States
- State: Georgia
- Counties: Treutlen, Emanuel, Johnson, Jefferson, Burke

Highway system
- Georgia State Highway System; Interstate; US; State; Special
← US 78	→ SR 79

State Route 78 (SR 78) is a 59.6-mile-long (95.9 km) backward question mark-shaped state highway in the southeast part of the U.S. state of Georgia. The highway travels from Soperton north and northwest to Wrightsville, then turning northeast to Wadley and, finally, east, to its eastern terminus, at a point northwest of Midville.

== Route description ==
SR 78 begins at an intersection with SR 46 in the northeast part of Soperton. It heads south, southwest, and northwest to an intersection with U.S. Route 221 (US 221)/SR 15/SR 56 in downtown Soperton. At this point, SR 15 begins a long concurrency with SR 78 to Wrightsville. Two blocks later, SR 78 has a second intersection with SR 46. North of Soperton, SR 78 has an interchange with Interstate 16 (I-16). South of Adrian, SR 86 crosses SR 78's path. When the route arrives in Adrian, it intersects US 80/SR 26. To the northwest, in Wrightsville, SR 78 intersects SR 57. The two routes have a one-block concurrency to the intersection of US 319/SR 15/SR 31. At this intersection, US 319/SR 78 begin a concurrency to the northeast.

South of Bartow, US 221/SR 171 join the concurrency. The four routes head north toward Bartow. Just south of the town, they intersect SR 242. In the town, US 319/SR 78turn to the east, while US 221/SR 171 head north. In Wadley, they intersect US 1 BUS/SR 4 BUS and then the US 1/SR 4 mainline. At the latter intersection, US 319 ends. East of the city, SR 78 meets its northern terminus, at an intersection with SR 17 northwest of Midville

The only portion of SR 78 that is part of the National Highway System, a system of routes determined to be the most important for the nation's economy, mobility, and defense, is the concurrency with SR 15 from Soperton to Wrightsville.

== Major intersections ==
County	Location	mi	km	Destinations	Notes
Treutlen	Soperton	0.0	0.0	SR 46 (Metter Road) – Soperton, Metter	Southern terminus
Treutlen	Soperton	1.0	1.6	US 221 / SR 15 south / SR 56 (South Second Street) – Mount Vernon, Swainsboro	Southern end of SR 15 concurrency
Treutlen	Soperton	1.2	1.9	SR 46 (Metter Road) – Eastman, Metter	
Treutlen		5.0	8.0	I-16 (Jim L. Gillis Highway / SR 404) – Macon, Savannah	I-16 exit 71
Treutlen		8.5	13.7	SR 86 – East Dublin, Oak Park	
Emanuel	Adrian	12.0	19.3	US 80 / SR 26 (Main Street) – East Dublin, Swainsboro	
Johnson	Wrightsville	29.2	47.0	SR 57 east (East College Street) – Kite	Southern end of SR 57 concurrency
Johnson	Wrightsville	29.3	47.2	US 319 south / SR 15 north / SR 31 south / SR 57 west – Dublin, Tennille, Sandersville, Irwinton, Macon	Northern end of SR 15 and SR 57 concurrencies; southern end of US 319 concurrency; northern terminus of SR 31
Jefferson		44.6	71.8	US 221 south / SR 171 south – Kite	Southern end of US 221/SR 171 concurrency
Jefferson		47.9	77.1	SR 242 (Minor Drive) – Sandersville	
Jefferson	Bartow	48.2	77.6	US 221 north / SR 171 north (Church Street) – Louisville	Northern end of US 221/SR 171 concurrency
Jefferson	Wadley	52.4	84.3	US 1 Bus. (North Main Street / SR 4 Bus.) – Swainsboro, Louisville	
Jefferson	Wadley	53.0	85.3	US 1 / SR 4 / US 319 ends – Swainsboro, Louisville	Northern end of US 319 concurrency; northern terminus of US 319
Burke		59.6	95.9	SR 17 / Robert Johnson Road south – Midville, Millen, Louisville	Northern terminus of SR 78; northern terminus of Robert Johnson Road
1.000 mi = 1.609 km; 1.000 km = 0.621 mi: Concurrency terminus
