= Pig Monument =

Memorial in Washington County, Georgia

- 32°50′06″N 82°56′24″W
- Location: Washington County, Georgia, United States
- Designer: Harold Lawrence
- Fabricator: Galen Mills
- Type: Historical marker
- Material: Granite
- Height: 6 feet (1.8 m)
- Dedicated date: October 18, 1992
- Dedicated to: The people of Washington County who helped rescue a pig from a well in 1933

The Pig Monument is a monument in Washington County, Georgia, United States. The monument, which is a 6-foot (1.8 m) granite historical marker, honors the county residents who, in 1933, helped a local farmer to rescue a pig of his that had fallen down a 40 ft (12 m) dry well. The monument was conceived of by a local pastor and author who had heard of the story several decades later and was dedicated in 1992.

== History ==
=== Background ===
In 1933, during the Great Depression, Bartow Barron, a farmer from Washington County, Georgia, lost his Duroc pig, which he was raising for meat for the winter. After searching for it, he found the pig at the bottom of a collapsed dry well that was 40 ft (12 m) deep. Barron decided to rescue the pig by slowly filling in the well with dirt, and many of his neighbors, who were also farmers, decided to help him with this. After 12 days of shoveling dirt, the well had been filled in enough that the pig was able to come out of the well.

=== Erection ===
About 60 years after the event, Harold Lawrence, a local priest at First Methodist Church in nearby Milledgeville, Georgia, was collecting stories for a book of poetry about the region, Southland and Other Poems of the South, when a member of congregation told him about the pig story and took him to the location of the still-standing abandoned well, which by the 1990s had become a pine plantation. Lawrence included the story in his book, published in 1992, and decided to erect a monument honoring the event near the well. Lawrence contacted Galen Mills of Elberton, Georgia, to construct the monument, based on an overall design by Lawrence himself. The land for the monument was provided by the current property owners. The monument was dedicated on October 18, 1992, with speakers at the ceremony including Lawrence, Wesley Pittman (the congregant who took Lawrence to the site), a professor from Emory University, and the mayor of the nearby city of Oconee. The monument was officially unveiled by several children who removed a black veil from the structure. As of 2017, the monument is maintained by the descendants of the people who were involved in the 1933 event, as well as by several professors from Georgia College & State University in Milledgeville.

== Design ==
The monument is a 6 ft (1.8 m)-tall granite slab. The slab bears the following inscription:

ON THIS SPOT IN 1933 DURING THE GREAT DEPRESSION NEIGHBORS OF A FARMER NAMED BARTOW BARRON JOINED TOGETHER TO RESCUE HIS PIG FROM A DRY WELL. THIS MONUMENT IS ERECTED TO THE SPIRIT OF FRIENDSHIP AND COMMUNITY SO CHARACTERISTIC OF THOSE TIMES.

Additionally, the monument bears the names of donors to the project.

It is located in Washington County, near the cities of Oconee and Tennille, about 20 ft (6.1 m) off of Georgia State Route 272. A road sign indicating the location reads "PIG MONUMENT".
