= Washington State Prison =

Prison in Georgia, United States

Coordinates: 32.9884°N 82.5949°W

- Interactive map of Washington State Prison
- Location: 13262 GA-24 Davisboro, Georgia
- Status: open
- Security class: minimum and medium security
- Capacity: 1548
- Opened: 1991
- Managed by: Georgia Department of Corrections

Washington State Prison is located in Davisboro in Washington County, Georgia. It is a facility for a maximum of 1548 adult male inmates at minimum and medium security. It is a part of the Georgia Department of Corrections.

The Washington State Prison is not to be confused with the Washington State Penitentiary, located in Walla Walla in the state of Washington.

In January 2026, the prison was placed on lockdown when four inmates were killed, 12 inmates hospitalized, and one guard was injured due to inmates apparently fighting among themselves.
