= Goat Town, Georgia =

Unincorporated community in Georgia, U.S.

Coordinates: 33°01′08″N 82°58′52″W

Goat Town is an unincorporated community in Washington County, in the U.S. state of Georgia.

== History ==
The community was so named on account of a large herd of goats kept by the proprietor of a county store at the town site.
