= Pringle, Georgia =

Unincorporated community in Georgia, U.S.

Coordinates: 32°48′01″N 82°38′04″W

Pringle is an unincorporated community in Washington County, in the U.S. state of Georgia.

== History ==
A post office called Pringle was established in 1883, and remained in operation until 1903. The community was named after C.R. Pringle, a local resident.
