= Washington County, Georgia =

County in Georgia, United States

- County
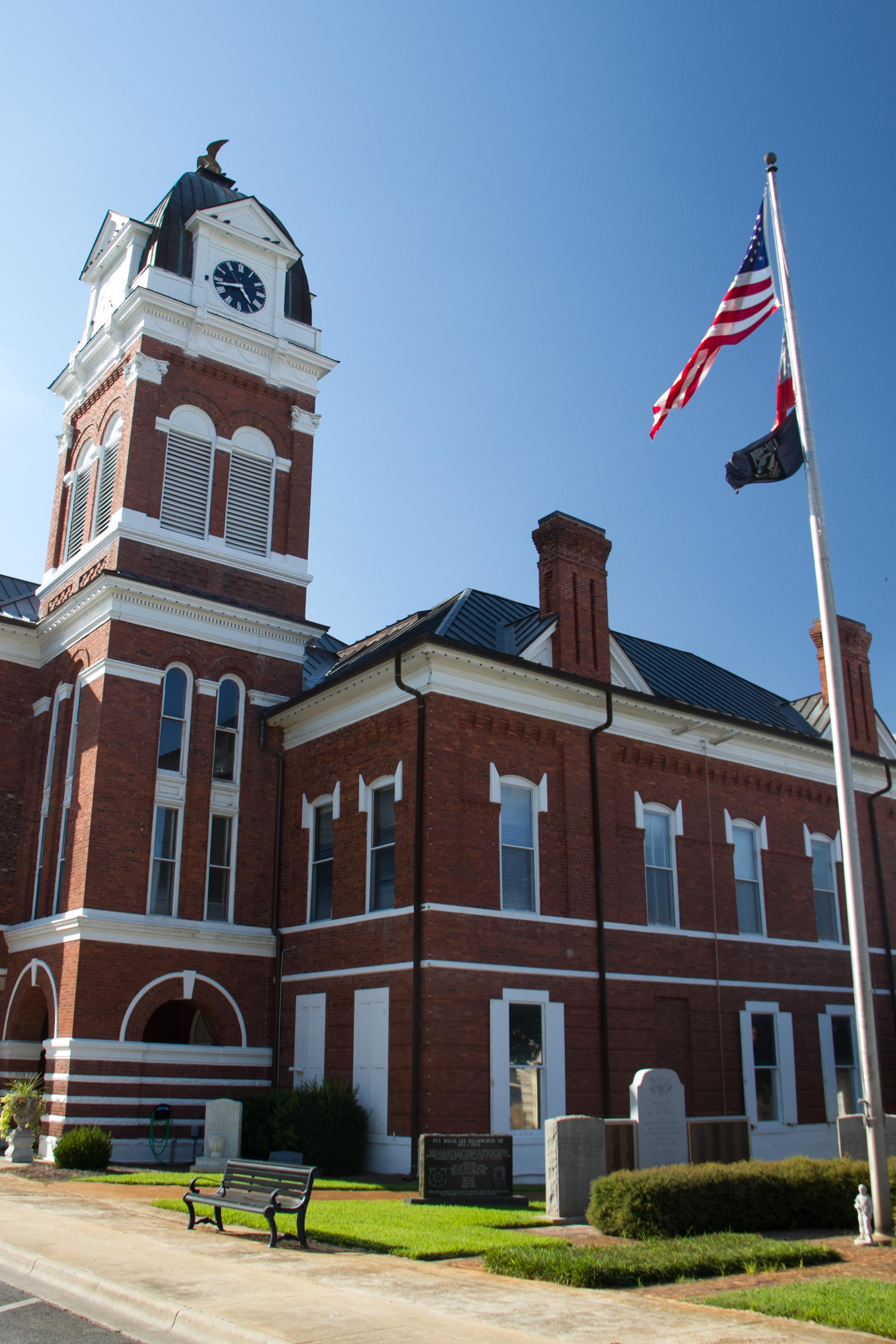
- Washington County Courthouse in Sandersville

- Location within the U.S. state of Georgia
- Coordinates: 32°58′N 82°47′W
- Country: United States
- State: Georgia
- Founded: February 25, 1784; 242 years ago
- Named for: George Washington
- Seat: Sandersville
- Largest city: Sandersville

Area
  - Total: 684 sq mi (1,770 km^{2})
  - Land: 678 sq mi (1,760 km^{2})
  - Water: 5.9 sq mi (15 km^{2}) 0.9%

Population (2020)
  - Total: 19,988
  - Estimate (2025): 19,453 ▼
  - Density: 29.5/sq mi (11.4/km^{2})
- Time zone: UTC−5 (Eastern)
  - Summer (DST): UTC−4 (EDT)
- Congressional district: 12th
- Website: www.washingtoncountyga.gov

Washington County is a county located in the U.S. state of Georgia. As of the 2020 census, the population was 19,988. The county seat is Sandersville. The county was established on February 25, 1784. It was named for Revolutionary War general and President of the United States George Washington.

== Geography ==
According to the U.S. Census Bureau, the county has a total area of 684 square miles (1,770 km^{2}), of which 678 square miles (1,760 km^{2}) is land and 5.9 square miles (15 km^{2}) (0.9%) is water.

The western portion of Washington County, west of a north-to-south line running through Sandersville, is located in the Lower Oconee River sub-basin of the Altamaha River basin. The northeastern portion of the county, north of Riddleville, is located in the Upper Ogeechee River sub-basin of the Ogeechee River basin, while the southeastern portion, centered on Harrison, is located in the Ohoopee River sub-basin of the Altamaha River basin.

=== Major highways ===
- State Route 15
- State Route 24
  - State Route 24 Spur
- State Route 57
- State Route 68
- State Route 88
- State Route 102
- State Route 231
- State Route 242
  - State Route 242 Spur
- State Route 272
- State Route 540 (Fall Line Freeway)

=== Adjacent counties ===
- Glascock County (northeast)
- Jefferson County (east)
- Johnson County (south)
- Wilkinson County (southwest)
- Baldwin County (west)
- Hancock County (northwest)

== Communities ==
=== Cities ===
- Davisboro
- Oconee
- Sandersville (county seat)
- Tennille

=== Towns ===
- Deepstep
- Harrison
- Riddleville

=== Census-designated places ===
- Warthen

=== Other unincorporated communities ===
- Ennis, Georgia
- Goat Town
- Hamburg, Washington County, Georgia
- Irwins Crossroads
- Pringle
- Sun Hill
- Tanner, Georgia
- Veal, Washington County, Georgia

== Demographics ==
Historical population
Census	Pop.	Note	%±
1790	4,552		—
1800	10,300		126.3%
1810	9,940		−3.5%
1820	10,627		6.9%
1830	9,820		−7.6%
1840	10,565		7.6%
1850	11,766		11.4%
1860	12,698		7.9%
1870	15,842		24.8%
1880	21,964		38.6%
1890	25,237		14.9%
1900	28,227		11.8%
1910	28,174		−0.2%
1920	28,147		−0.1%
1930	25,030		−11.1%
1940	24,230		−3.2%
1950	21,012		−13.3%
1960	18,903		−10.0%
1970	17,480		−7.5%
1980	18,842		7.8%
1990	19,112		1.4%
2000	21,176		10.8%
2010	21,187		0.1%
2020	19,988		−5.7%
2025 (est.)	19,453	▼	−2.7%
U.S. Decennial Census; 1790-1880 1890-1910; 1920-1930 1930-1940; 1940-1950 1960-1980; 1980-2000 2010 2020

=== Racial and ethnic composition ===
Washington County, Georgia – Racial and ethnic composition Note: the US Census treats Hispanic/Latino as an ethnic category. This table excludes Latinos from the racial categories and assigns them to a separate category. Hispanics/Latinos may be of any race.
Race / Ethnicity (NH = Non-Hispanic)	Pop 1980	Pop 1990	Pop 2000	Pop 2010	Pop 2020	% 1980	% 1990	% 2000	% 2010	% 2020
White alone (NH)	9,115	9,179	9,620	9,339	8,412	48.38%	48.03%	45.43%	44.08%	42.09%
Black or African American alone (NH)	9,546	9,831	11,233	11,124	10,698	50.66%	51.44%	53.05%	52.50%	53.52%
Native American or Alaska Native alone (NH)	2	10	35	19	37	0.01%	0.05%	0.17%	0.09%	0.19%
Asian alone (NH)	23	25	55	104	76	0.12%	0.13%	0.26%	0.49%	0.38%
Native Hawaiian or Pacific Islander alone (NH)	x	x	2	1	0	x	x	0.01%	0.00%	0.00%
Other race alone (NH)	22	2	11	26	30	0.12%	0.01%	0.05%	0.12%	0.15%
Mixed race or Multiracial (NH)	x	x	86	167	401	x	x	0.41%	0.79%	2.01%
Hispanic or Latino (any race)	134	65	134	407	334	0.71%	0.34%	0.63%	1.92%	1.67%
Total	18,842	19,112	21,176	21,187	19,988	100.00%	100.00%	100.00%	100.00%	100.00%

=== 2020 census ===
As of the 2020 census, the county had a population of 19,988. The median age was 42.2 years, with 21.4% of residents under the age of 18 and 19.1% of residents 65 years of age or older. For every 100 females there were 102.7 males, and for every 100 females age 18 and over there were 102.8 males age 18 and over. 35.5% of residents lived in urban areas, while 64.5% lived in rural areas.

The racial makeup of the county was 42.4% White, 53.7% Black or African American, 0.2% American Indian and Alaska Native, 0.4% Asian, 0.0% Native Hawaiian and Pacific Islander, 0.8% from some other race, and 2.5% from two or more races. Hispanic or Latino residents of any race comprised 1.7% of the population.

There were 7,506 households in the county, of which 29.8% had children under the age of 18 living with them and 37.9% had a female householder with no spouse or partner present. About 30.0% of all households were made up of individuals and 14.7% had someone living alone who was 65 years of age or older. Of those households, 5,315 were families.

There were 8,556 housing units, of which 12.3% were vacant. Among occupied housing units, 67.6% were owner-occupied and 32.4% were renter-occupied. The homeowner vacancy rate was 1.4% and the rental vacancy rate was 4.5%.

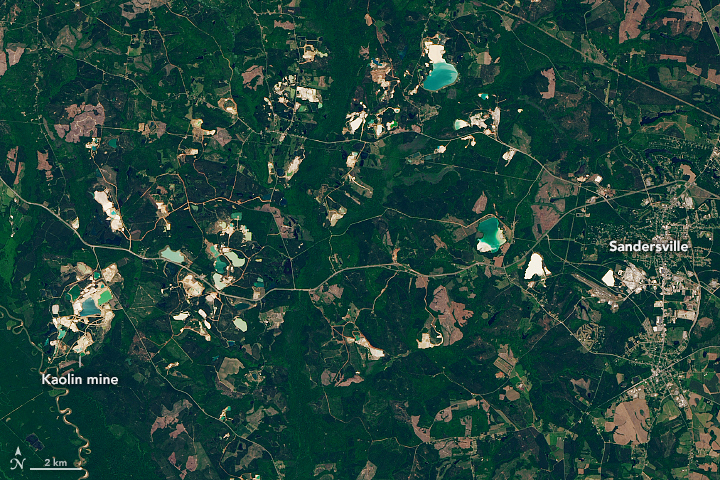
Kaolin mines are a major industry in Washington County. Kaolin has had a particularly strong impact on the town of Sandersville which brands itself as the “kaolin capital of the world.” Each October, the town hosts a festival that includes a parade of heavy mining machinery, kaolin mine tours, and a beauty pageant that crowns Miss Kaolin.

== Education ==
The county is served by the Washington County School District, which includes:

- Ridge Road Elementary School
- T.J. Elder Middle School
- Washington County High School.

The county is also the location of one privately run school:

- Brentwood School

== In popular culture ==
The 1933 short story "The People's Choice" by Erskine Caldwell is set in Washington County, where the story's protagonist is a popular local politician elected again and again as the county's tax assessor.

In 1992, the Pig Monument was erected in the county, near Oconee off of Georgia State Route 272. The monument commemorates a 1933 event where several residents of the county gathered together to help a local farmer rescue a pig that had fallen down a dry well.

The biography of one of the main characters (Grant Alexander) in the 2011 console game X-Men: Destiny states that they were born in Sandersville, Georgia.

== Politics ==
Like most other majority-minority counties in the South, Washington County has primarily backed Democratic Party candidates for most of its history. Democratic margins of victory in presidential elections were far greater prior to 1964, but the county has only failed to back a Democratic presidential candidate five times in its history. However, no candidate of any party since Bill Clinton in 1996 has managed to win the county by a margin of 1,000 votes or greater. It was the most Black county in Georgia to vote for Donald Trump in 2024.

For elections to the United States House of Representatives, Washington County is part of Georgia's 12th congressional district, currently represented by Rick Allen. For elections to the Georgia State Senate, Washington County is part of District 26. For elections to the Georgia House of Representatives, Washington County is part of District 128.

United States presidential election results for Washington County, Georgia
Year	Republican		Democratic		Third party(ies)	
Year	No.	%	No.	%	No.	%
1912	28	2.51%	920	82.51%	167	14.98%
1916	18	1.60%	954	84.57%	156	13.83%
1920	118	9.42%	1,134	90.58%	0	0.00%
1924	130	13.47%	758	78.55%	77	7.98%
1928	472	29.24%	1,142	70.76%	0	0.00%
1932	9	0.46%	1,923	99.33%	4	0.21%
1936	149	10.34%	1,286	89.24%	6	0.42%
1940	253	18.41%	1,112	80.93%	9	0.66%
1944	351	24.29%	1,094	75.71%	0	0.00%
1948	204	14.79%	1,169	84.77%	6	0.44%
1952	795	25.03%	2,381	74.97%	0	0.00%
1956	602	19.22%	2,530	80.78%	0	0.00%
1960	956	32.30%	2,004	67.70%	0	0.00%
1964	2,296	55.63%	1,830	44.34%	1	0.02%
1968	1,247	26.43%	1,443	30.58%	2,029	43.00%
1972	3,901	75.79%	1,246	24.21%	0	0.00%
1976	1,657	30.01%	3,865	69.99%	0	0.00%
1980	1,822	33.97%	3,452	64.35%	90	1.68%
1984	2,887	48.76%	3,034	51.24%	0	0.00%
1988	2,752	51.12%	2,615	48.58%	16	0.30%
1992	2,384	35.45%	3,508	52.16%	833	12.39%
1996	2,348	33.94%	4,057	58.64%	514	7.43%
2000	3,162	47.26%	3,476	51.95%	53	0.79%
2004	4,081	51.93%	3,733	47.51%	44	0.56%
2008	4,216	47.49%	4,607	51.89%	55	0.62%
2012	4,035	45.76%	4,714	53.46%	68	0.77%
2016	4,149	48.90%	4,200	49.50%	136	1.60%
2020	4,668	49.24%	4,743	50.03%	69	0.73%
2024	4,824	50.82%	4,643	48.91%	26	0.27%

== See also ==
- Central Savannah River Area
- National Register of Historic Places listings in Washington County, Georgia
- List of counties in Georgia
