= Sun Hill, Georgia =

Unincorporated community in Georgia, U.S.

Coordinates: 32°57′5.56″N 82°43′45.49″W

Sun Hill is an unincorporated community in Washington County, in the U.S. state of Georgia.

== History ==
The name Sun Hill was adopted when the railroad was extended to the site. A post office called Sun Hill was established in 1872, and remained in operation until 1930. A variant name is "Sunhill".
