= Brentwood School (Sandersville) =

School in Sandersville, Georgia

Location
- Sandersville, Georgia; 32.994692°N 82.814397°W

Information
- Type: Private
- Established: 1969
- Principal: Danny Howell
- Grades: K–12
- Enrollment: 349
- Colors: Blue and Gold
- Website: www.brentwoodschool.org

Brentwood School is an independent private school in Sandersville, Georgia. Brentwood School houses 15 grades in three different buildings throughout campus, K-3, K-4, and Kindergarten are found in the Lucy Nell Smith building. Grades 1-6 are found in the Linton Hall Building and grades 7-8 and 9-12 are all housed in the Upper School Building. In 2016, the school was ranked as one of the top 100 private schools in Georgia.

== Sports ==
The school offers nine sports which include baseball, basketball, football, tennis, track and field, competitive cheerleading, softball, cross country, and golf. The school competes in the Georgia Independent School Association (GISA) and is in classification AA. The school has won 17 state championships across its various sports teams since 1970.

== Extracurricular activities ==
The school offers ten extracurricular activities: Anchor Club, Beta Club, Debate, Drama, Interact Club, Leo Club, Fellowship of Christian Athletes, Giving Back Service Organization, Literary, and National Honor Society.
