= Harrison, Georgia =

- Town
- Location in Washington County and the state of Georgia
- Coordinates: 32°49′32″N 82°43′28″W
- Country: United States
- State: Georgia
- County: Washington

Area
  - Total: 1.77 sq mi (4.58 km^{2})
  - Land: 1.71 sq mi (4.42 km^{2})
  - Water: 0.058 sq mi (0.15 km^{2})
- Elevation: 410 ft (125 m)

Population (2020)
  - Total: 339
  - Density: 198.5/sq mi (76.66/km^{2})
- Time zone: UTC-5 (Eastern (EST))
  - Summer (DST): UTC-4 (EDT)
- ZIP code: 31035
- Area code: 478
- FIPS code: 13-36920
- GNIS feature ID: 0331920

Harrison is a town in Washington County, Georgia, United States. The population was 339 according to the 2020 census.

== History ==
The Georgia General Assembly incorporated the place as 'Town of Harrison,' in 1886, and this community was named after Green B. Harrison, one of the early settlers.

== Geography ==
Harrison is located at 32°49′32″N 82°43′28″W (32.825655, -82.724504). According to the United States Census Bureau, the town has a total area of 1.8 square miles (4.7 km^{2}), of which 1.7 square miles (4.4 km^{2}) is land and 0.04 square miles (0.10 km^{2}) (2.26%) is water.

== Demographics ==
Historical population
Census	Pop.	Note	%±
1890	575		—
1900	322		−44.0%
1910	383		18.9%
1920	345		−9.9%
1930	274		−20.6%
1940	298		8.8%
1950	261		−12.4%
1960	209		−19.9%
1970	329		57.4%
1980	456		38.6%
1990	414		−9.2%
2000	509		22.9%
2010	489		−3.9%
2020	339		−30.7%
U.S. Decennial Census

=== Racial and ethnic composition ===
Harrison town, Georgia – Racial and ethnic composition Note: the US Census treats Hispanic/Latino as an ethnic category. This table excludes Latinos from the racial categories and assigns them to a separate category. Hispanics/Latinos may be of any race.
Race / Ethnicity (NH = Non-Hispanic)	Pop 2000	Pop 2010	Pop 2020	% 2000	% 2010	% 2020
White alone (NH)	97	108	81	19.06%	22.09%	23.89%
Black or African American alone (NH)	404	355	244	79.37%	72.60%	71.98%
Native American or Alaska Native alone (NH)	4	0	0	0.79%	0.00%	0.00%
Asian alone (NH)	0	4	0	0.00%	0.82%	0.00%
Native Hawaiian or Pacific Islander alone (NH)	0	0	0	0.00%	0.00%	0.00%
Other race alone (NH)	1	0	0	0.20%	0.00%	0.00%
Mixed race or Multiracial (NH)	2	10	11	0.39%	2.04%	3.24%
Hispanic or Latino (any race)	1	12	3	0.20%	2.45%	0.88%
Total	509	489	339	100.00%	100.00%	100.00%

== Notable people ==
- Herbert Arlene (1914–1989), Pennsylvania State Senator from 1967 to 1980

== See also ==
- Central Savannah River Area
