= Oconee, Georgia =

- City
- Location in Washington County and the state of Georgia
- Coordinates: 32°51′23″N 82°57′16″W
- Country: United States
- State: Georgia
- County: Washington

Area
  - Total: 1.30 sq mi (3.36 km^{2})
  - Land: 1.30 sq mi (3.36 km^{2})
  - Water: 0 sq mi (0.00 km^{2})
- Elevation: 230 ft (70 m)

Population (2020)
  - Total: 197
  - Density: 152/sq mi (58.6/km^{2})
- Time zone: UTC-5 (Eastern (EST))
  - Summer (DST): UTC-4 (EDT)
- ZIP code: 31067
- Area code: 478
- FIPS code: 13-57456
- GNIS feature ID: 0332556

Oconee is a city in Washington County, Georgia, United States. The population was 197 in 2020.

== History ==
The city's name derives from the Oconee, a Hitchiti-speaking tribe who inhabited central Georgia from 1692 until 1715. The Oconee lived in present-day Baldwin County, Georgia at a settlement known as Oconee Old Town, later moving to the Chattahoochee River in the early 18th century. The name exists in several variations, including Ocone, Oconi, Ocony, and Ekwoni.

The city of Oconee was named after the river that bears the tribe's name. It was founded in the early 1840s, when the railroad was extended to that point.

The Georgia General Assembly incorporated Oconee as a town in 1876.

== Notable natives ==
- Berry Gordy Sr. and wife, Bertha Fuller Gordy, the parents of legendary music producer and Motown founder Berry Gordy Jr., left Oconee in 1922.

== Geography ==
Oconee is located at 32°51′23″N 82°57′16″W (32.856310, -82.954316). According to the United States Census Bureau, the city has a total area of 1.1 square miles (2.8 km^{2}), all land.

== Demographics ==
Historical population
Census	Pop.	Note	%±
1970	262		—
1980	306		16.8%
1990	234		−23.5%
2000	280		19.7%
2010	252		−10.0%
2020	197		−21.8%
U.S. Decennial Census

As of the census of 2000, there were 280 people, 94 households, and 67 families living in the city. By 2020, its population was 197.

== See also ==
- Central Savannah River Area
