= Riddleville, Georgia =

- Town
- Location in Washington County and the state of Georgia
- Coordinates: 32°54′24″N 82°39′52″W
- Country: United States
- State: Georgia
- County: Washington

Government
  - Mayor: Ken Westbrook
  - Riddleville City Council: List of Members: Mike Beckworth; Jimmy Glover; Mike Sheppard; Danny Snell

Area
  - Total: 0.78 sq mi (2.03 km^{2})
  - Land: 0.76 sq mi (1.98 km^{2})
  - Water: 0.019 sq mi (0.05 km^{2})
- Elevation: 410 ft (125 m)

Population (2020)
  - Total: 80
  - Density: 104.4/sq mi (40.31/km^{2})
- Time zone: UTC-5 (Eastern (EST))
  - Summer (DST): UTC-4 (EDT)
- FIPS code: 13-65156
- GNIS feature ID: 0332852

Riddleville is a town in Washington County, Georgia, United States. The population was 80 in 2020.

== History ==
The community was named after Anderson Riddle, the original owner of the town site. The Georgia General Assembly incorporated Riddleville as a town in 1859.

== Geography ==
Riddleville is located at 32°54′24″N 82°39′52″W (32.906541, -82.664385). According to the United States Census Bureau, the town has a total area of 0.8 square miles (2.1 km^{2}), of which 0.8 square miles (2.1 km^{2}) is land and 1.28% is water.

== Demographics ==
Historical population
Census	Pop.	Note	%±
1880	195		—
1900	178		—
1910	140		−21.3%
1920	149		6.4%
1930	121		−18.8%
1940	115		−5.0%
1950	106		−7.8%
1960	111		4.7%
1970	143		28.8%
1980	154		7.7%
1990	79		−48.7%
2000	124		57.0%
2010	96		−22.6%
2020	80		−16.7%
U.S. Decennial Census

At the 2000 census there were 124 people, 39 households, and 34 families living in the town. By 2020, its population was 80.

== See also ==
- Central Savannah River Area
