= Wrightsville, Georgia =

- City
- Location in Johnson County, Georgia
- Coordinates: 32°43′30″N 82°43′13″W
- Country: United States
- State: Georgia
- County: Johnson

Area
  - Total: 3.75 sq mi (9.70 km^{2})
  - Land: 3.66 sq mi (9.49 km^{2})
  - Water: 0.081 sq mi (0.21 km^{2})
- Elevation: 344 ft (105 m)

Population (2020)
  - Total: 3,449
  - Density: 941/sq mi (363.4/km^{2})
- Time zone: UTC-5 (Eastern (EST))
  - Summer (DST): UTC-4 (EDT)
- ZIP code: 31096
- Area code: 478
- FIPS code: 13-84512
- GNIS feature ID: 0325586

Wrightsville is a city in and the county seat of Johnson County, Georgia, United States. The population was 2,195 at the 2010 census, down from 2,223 at the 2000 census. By 2020, its population grew to 3,449. The city limits include Johnson State Prison on the northeast side of town. Wrightsville is part of the Dublin Micropolitan Statistical Area.

== History ==
The Georgia General Assembly incorporated Wrightsville in 1866. The community was named after John B. Wright, a town promoter.

== Geography ==
Wrightsville is located west of the center of Johnson County at 32°43′30″N 82°43′13″W (32.725126, -82.720289). U.S. Route 319 passes through the city center on Elm Street; it leads northeast 19 miles (31 km) to Bartow and southwest 18 miles (29 km) to Dublin. State Routes 15 and 57 also pass through the center of Wrightsville. SR-15 leads north 19 miles (31 km) to Sandersville and southeast 17 miles (27 km) to Adrian, while SR-57 leads west 37 miles (60 km) to Irwinton and southeast 25 miles (40 km) to Swainsboro.

According to the United States Census Bureau, Wrightsville has a total area of 3.6 square miles (9.3 km^{2}), of which 3.5 square miles (9.1 km^{2}) are land and 0.1 square miles (0.2 km^{2}), or 2.20%, are water. The city is drained by tributaries of the Ohoopee River.

== Demographics ==
Historical population
| Census | Pop. | Note | %± |
|---|---|---|---|
| 1880 | 272 | | — |
| 1890 | 479 | | 76.1% |
| 1900 | 1,127 | | 135.3% |
| 1910 | 1,389 | | 23.2% |
| 1920 | 1,476 | | 6.3% |
| 1930 | 1,741 | | 18.0% |
| 1940 | 1,760 | | 1.1% |
| 1950 | 1,750 | | −0.6% |
| 1960 | 2,056 | | 17.5% |
| 1970 | 2,106 | | 2.4% |
| 1980 | 2,526 | | 19.9% |
| 1990 | 2,331 | | −7.7% |
| 2000 | 2,223 | | −4.6% |
| 2010 | 2,195 | | −1.3% |
| 2020 | 3,449 | | 57.1% |
U.S. Decennial Census; 1850-1870 1870-1880; 1890-1910 1920-1930; 1940 1950 1960; 1970 1980 1990; 2000 2010 2020

=== Racial and ethnic composition ===
Wrightsville city, Georgia – Racial and ethnic composition Note: the US Census treats Hispanic/Latino as an ethnic category. This table excludes Latinos from the racial categories and assigns them to a separate category. Hispanics/Latinos may be of any race.
| Race / Ethnicity (NH = Non-Hispanic) | Pop 2000 | Pop 2010 | Pop 2020 | % 2000 | % 2010 | % 2020 |
|---|---|---|---|---|---|---|
| White alone (NH) | 1,011 | 917 | 1,529 | 45.48% | 41.78% | 44.33% |
| Black or African American alone (NH) | 1,184 | 1,216 | 1,818 | 53.26% | 55.40% | 52.71% |
| Native American or Alaska Native alone (NH) | 0 | 9 | 2 | 0.00% | 0.41% | 0.06% |
| Asian alone (NH) | 5 | 8 | 17 | 0.22% | 0.36% | 0.49% |
| Native Hawaiian or Pacific Islander alone (NH) | 0 | 2 | 6 | 0.00% | 0.09% | 0.17% |
| Other race alone (NH) | 0 | 4 | 4 | 0.00% | 0.18% | 0.12% |
| Mixed race or Multiracial (NH) | 8 | 15 | 46 | 0.36% | 0.68% | 1.33% |
| Hispanic or Latino (any race) | 15 | 24 | 27 | 0.67% | 1.09% | 0.78% |
| Total | 2,223 | 2,195 | 3,449 | 100.00% | 100.00% | 100.00% |

=== 2020 census ===
As of the 2020 census, Wrightsville had a population of 3,449. The median age was 43.4 years. 13.6% of residents were under the age of 18 and 15.0% of residents were 65 years of age or older. For every 100 females there were 221.1 males, and for every 100 females age 18 and over there were 257.9 males age 18 and over.

0.0% of residents lived in urban areas, while 100.0% lived in rural areas.

There were 807 households in Wrightsville, of which 30.6% had children under the age of 18 living in them. Of all households, 25.5% were married-couple households, 18.5% were households with a male householder and no spouse or partner present, and 50.2% were households with a female householder and no spouse or partner present. About 38.4% of all households were made up of individuals and 17.6% had someone living alone who was 65 years of age or older.

There were 910 housing units, of which 11.3% were vacant. The homeowner vacancy rate was 1.9% and the rental vacancy rate was 5.7%.

== Education ==
=== Johnson County School District ===
The Johnson County School District holds pre-school to grade twelve, and consists of one elementary school, one middle school, and one high school. The district has 86 full-time teachers and over 1,384 students.

- Johnson County Elementary School
- Johnson County Middle School
- Johnson County High School

== Arts and culture ==
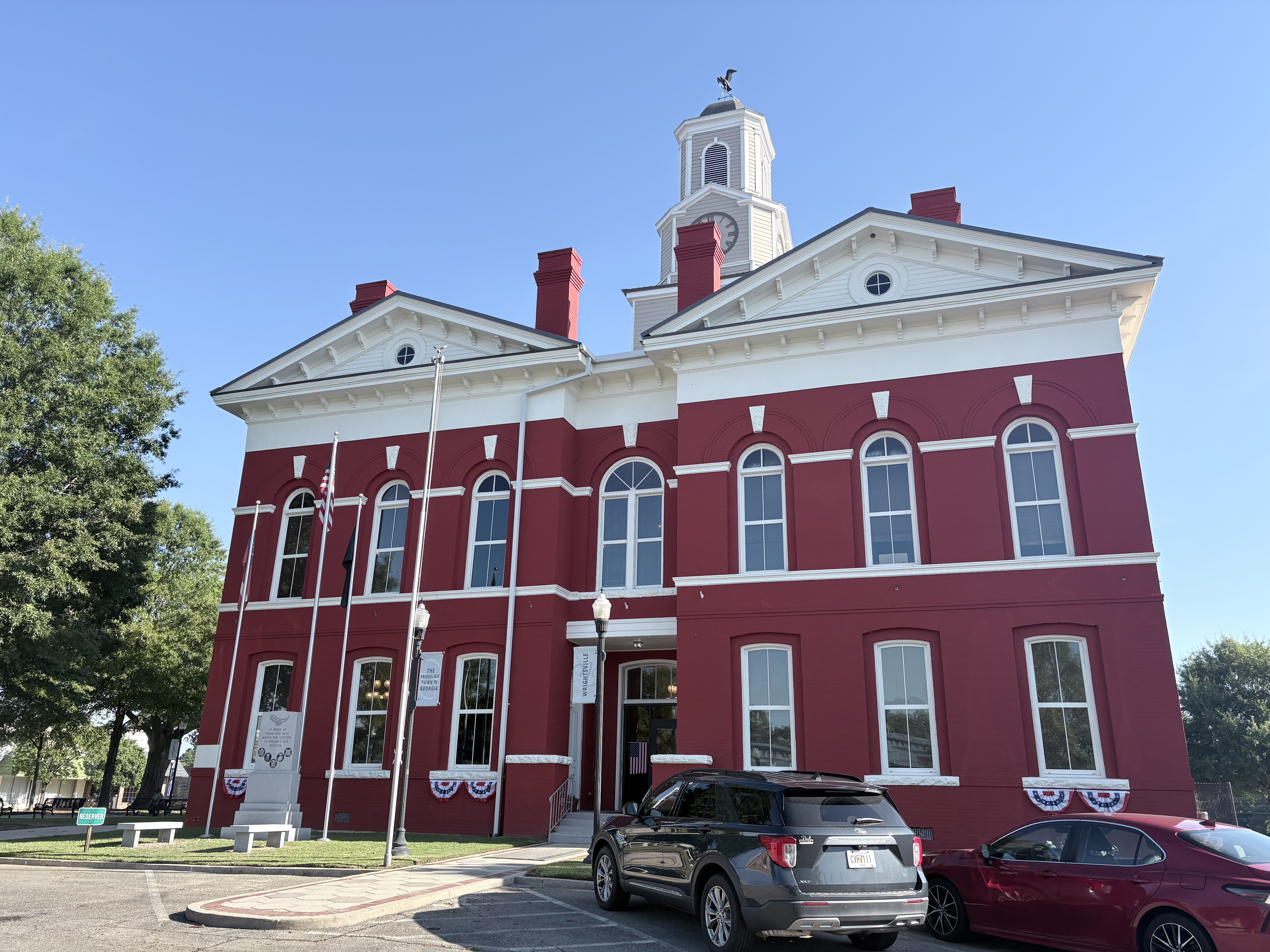
Courthouse located in the city center

The Old Fashioned Fourth of July Festival has been held in the small town of Wrightsville since 1976. It starts on the eve of July 4 with a fireworks show. This is followed by a street dance on the courthouse square. The festivities continue the next morning with a parade of various floats created by churches and businesses in the community. There is a contest for the winning float design. Following the parade, there are various booths and vendors set up downtown.

== Notable people ==
- J. Roy Rowland, Congressman from 1983 to 1995
- Herschel Walker
