= Bartow, Georgia =

- Town
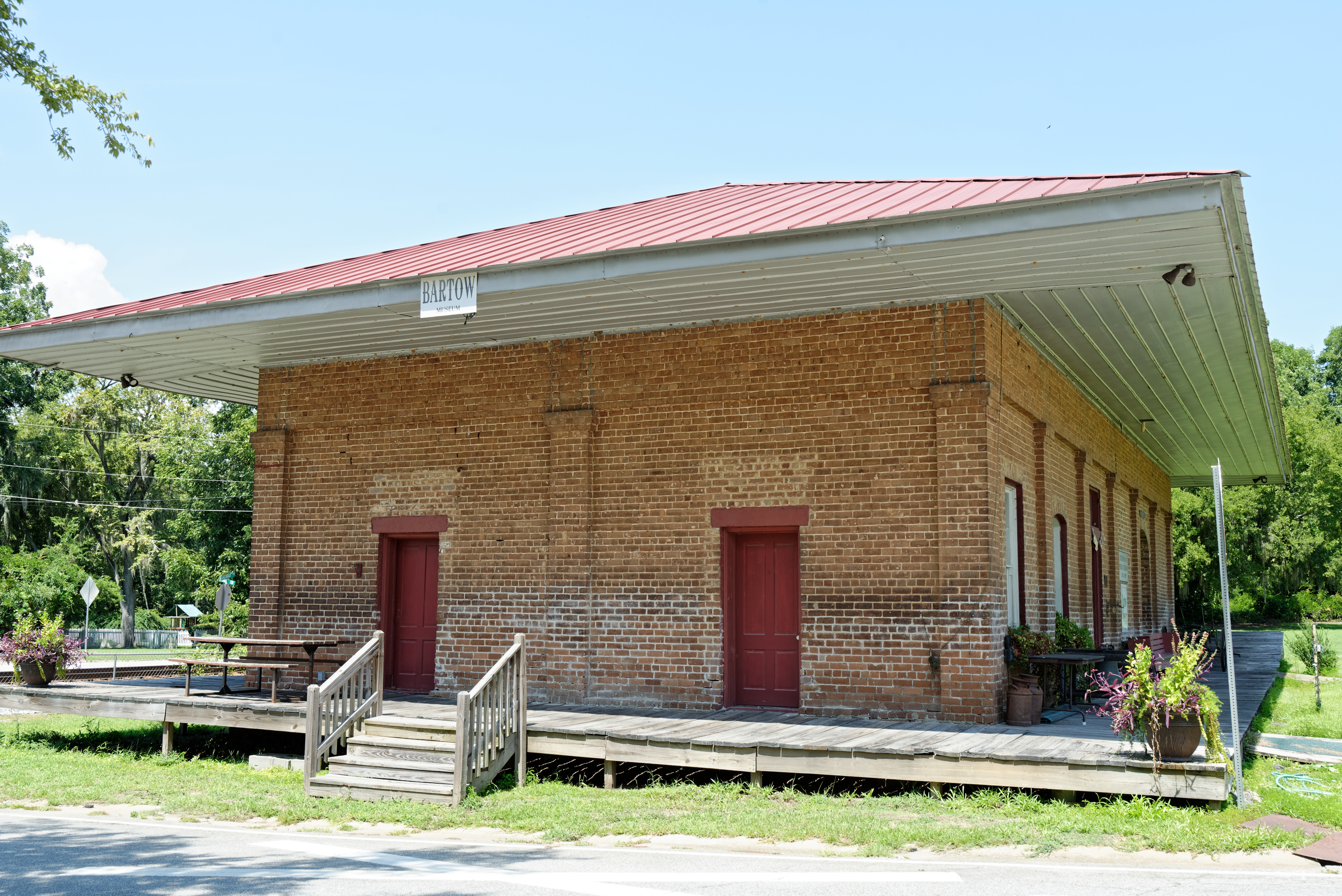
- Central of Georgia Railway depot

- Location in Jefferson County and the state of Georgia
- Coordinates: 32°52′52″N 82°28′20″W
- Country: United States
- State: Georgia
- County: Jefferson
- Named for: Francis S. Bartow

Area
  - Total: 1.13 sq mi (2.93 km^{2})
  - Land: 1.13 sq mi (2.92 km^{2})
  - Water: 0 sq mi (0.00 km^{2})
- Elevation: 243 ft (74 m)

Population (2020)
  - Total: 186
  - Density: 165/sq mi (63.6/km^{2})
- Time zone: UTC-5 (Eastern (EST))
  - Summer (DST): UTC-4 (EDT)
- ZIP code: 30413
- Area code: 478
- FIPS code: 13-05680
- GNIS feature ID: 0354475

Bartow is a town in Jefferson County, Georgia, United States. As of the 2020 census, the city had a population of 186. Initially the town was known as "Spier's Turnout", but was changed to honor the first Confederate officer to die in battle, Colonel Francis S. Bartow of Savannah, Georgia, who was killed at the Battle of Manassas, Virginia on July 21, 1861.

== Geography ==
Bartow is located at 32°52′52″N 82°28′20″W (32.881111, -82.472222).

== Demographics ==
Historical population
Census	Pop.	Note	%±
1880	248		—
1890	437		76.2%
1900	286		−34.6%
1910	384		34.3%
1920	582		51.6%
1930	416		−28.5%
1940	438		5.3%
1950	347		−20.8%
1960	366		5.5%
1970	333		−9.0%
1980	357		7.2%
1990	292		−18.2%
2000	223		−23.6%
2010	286		28.3%
2020	186		−35.0%
U.S. Decennial Census

=== Racial and ethnic composition ===
Bartow town, Georgia – Racial and ethnic composition Note: the US Census treats Hispanic/Latino as an ethnic category. This table excludes Latinos from the racial categories and assigns them to a separate category. Hispanics/Latinos may be of any race.
Race / Ethnicity (NH = Non-Hispanic)	Pop 2000	Pop 2010	Pop 2020	% 2000	% 2010	% 2020
White alone (NH)	90	118	85	40.36%	41.26%	45.70%
Black or African American alone (NH)	130	167	96	58.30%	58.39%	51.61%
Native American or Alaska Native alone (NH)	0	0	1	0.00%	0.00%	0.54%
Asian alone (NH)	0	0	0	0.00%	0.00%	0.00%
Native Hawaiian or Pacific Islander alone (NH)	0	0	0	0.00%	0.00%	0.00%
Other race alone (NH)	0	0	0	0.00%	0.00%	0.00%
Mixed race or Multiracial (NH)	0	0	2	0.00%	0.00%	1.08%
Hispanic or Latino (any race)	3	1	2	1.35%	0.35%	1.08%
Total	223	286	186	100.00%	100.00%	100.00%

== Notable person ==
- Robby Wells, American college football coach and politician

== See also ==
- Central Savannah River Area
