= Davisboro, Georgia =

- City
- Location in Washington County and the state of Georgia
- Coordinates: 32°58′48″N 82°36′32″W
- Country: United States
- State: Georgia
- County: Washington

Area
  - Total: 3.05 sq mi (7.91 km^{2})
  - Land: 3.05 sq mi (7.90 km^{2})
  - Water: 0.0039 sq mi (0.01 km^{2})
- Elevation: 302 ft (92 m)

Population (2020)
  - Total: 1,832
  - Density: 600/sq mi (231.8/km^{2})
- Time zone: UTC-5 (Eastern (EST))
  - Summer (DST): UTC-4 (EDT)
- ZIP code: 31018
- Area code: 478
- FIPS code: 13-21800
- GNIS feature ID: 0355454
- Website: https://www.davisboroga.gov/

Davisboro is a city in Washington County, Georgia, United States. Per the 2020 census, the population was 1,832.

== History ==
A post office called Davisboro(ugh) has been in operation since 1821. The community most likely was named after a pioneer settler with the surname Davis. The Georgia General Assembly incorporated the place in 1894 as the "Town of Davisboro".

On May 18, 1922, Charles Atkins, a 15-year-old African-American boy, was tortured and burnt alive by a white mob some 2,000 people strong after killing a white woman.

== Geography ==
Davisboro is located at 32°58′48″N 82°36′32″W (32.980128, -82.608892).

According to the United States Census Bureau, the city has a total area of 3.1 square miles (8.0 km^{2}), all land.

== Demographics ==
Historical population
Census	Pop.	Note	%±
1880	131		—
1890	224		71.0%
1900	387		72.8%
1910	589		52.2%
1920	653		10.9%
1930	654		0.2%
1940	533		−18.5%
1950	469		−12.0%
1960	417		−11.1%
1970	476		14.1%
1980	433		−9.0%
1990	407		−6.0%
2000	1,544		279.4%
2010	2,010		30.2%
2020	1,832		−8.9%
U.S. Decennial Census; 1850-1870 1870-1880; 1890-1910 1920-1930; 1940 1950 1960; 1970 1980 1990; 2000 2010 2020

=== Racial and ethnic composition ===
Davisboro city, Georgia – Racial and ethnic composition Note: the US Census treats Hispanic/Latino as an ethnic category. This table excludes Latinos from the racial categories and assigns them to a separate category. Hispanics/Latinos may be of any race.
Race / Ethnicity (NH = Non-Hispanic)	Pop 2010	Pop 2020	% 2010	% 2020
White alone (NH)	617	493	30.70%	26.91%
Black or African American alone (NH)	1,232	1,273	61.29%	69.49%
Native American or Alaska Native alone (NH)	0	0	0.00%	0.00%
Asian alone (NH)	9	0	0.45%	0.00%
Pacific Islander alone (NH)	0	0	0.00%	0.00%
Some Other Race alone (NH)	2	0	0.10%	0.00%
Mixed Race or Multi-Racial (NH)	9	9	0.45%	0.49%
Hispanic or Latino (any race)	141	57	7.01%	3.11%
Total	2,010	1,832	100.00%	100.00%

=== 2020 census ===
As of the 2020 census, Davisboro had a population of 1,832. The median age was 38.7 years. 5.7% of residents were under the age of 18 and 6.0% of residents were 65 years of age or older. For every 100 females there were 700.0 males, and for every 100 females age 18 and over there were 886.9 males age 18 and over.

0.0% of residents lived in urban areas, while 100.0% lived in rural areas.

There were 151 households in Davisboro, of which 36.4% had children under the age of 18 living in them. Of all households, 29.8% were married-couple households, 19.9% were households with a male householder and no spouse or partner present, and 49.0% were households with a female householder and no spouse or partner present. About 26.5% of all households were made up of individuals and 14.6% had someone living alone who was 65 years of age or older.

There were 177 housing units, of which 14.7% were vacant. The homeowner vacancy rate was 2.7% and the rental vacancy rate was 0.0%.

== Business ==
Built by Jacoby Development, the Azalea Solar Park was the largest of its kind in Georgia and opened for production in November 2013. The 80 acres (32 ha) Photovoltaic system produces 7.7 megawatts of power using ground-mounted photovoltaic panels.

== See also ==
- Central Savannah River Area
