= National Register of Historic Places listings in Burke County, Georgia =

Location of Burke County in Georgia

This is a list of properties and districts in Burke County, Georgia that are listed on the National Register of Historic Places (NRHP). There are 8 listings in all, and one former listing.

This National Park Service list is complete through NPS recent listings posted March 21, 2025.

== Current listings ==
	Name on the Register	Image	Date listed	Location	City or town	Description
1	Burke County Courthouse	Burke County Courthouse	September 18, 1980 (#80000980)	Courthouse Sq. 33°05′26″N 82°00′57″W	Waynesboro	
2	Girard Elementary School	Girard Elementary School	July 22, 2021 (#100006735)	9691 GA 23 South; 33°03′21″N 81°43′41″W	Girard	
3	Hopeful Baptist Church	Hopeful Baptist Church	January 11, 1993 (#92001734)	Winter Rd. E of jct. with Blythe Rd. 33°12′35″N 82°08′03″W	Keysville	Monumental Greek Revival church built 1850–51, notable for having white and black members before the Civil War.
4	John James Jones House	John James Jones House	February 15, 1980 (#80000981)	525 Jones Ave. 33°05′11″N 82°01′06″W	Waynesboro	
5	McCanaan Missionary Baptist Church and Cemetery	McCanaan Missionary Baptist Church and Cemetery	June 14, 2001 (#01000643)	McCanaan Church Rd. 32°59′03″N 81°42′08″W	Sardis	
6	Sapp Plantation	Sapp Plantation	February 8, 1980 (#80000979)	NW of Sardis on GA 24; 33°00′04″N 81°49′07″W	Sardis	
7	Waynesboro Commercial Historic District	Waynesboro Commercial Historic District	June 10, 1993 (#93000496)	E. 6th, E. 7th, E. 8th, S. Liberty and Myrick Sts. 33°11′30″N 82°01′01″W	Waynesboro	
8	Waynesboro Historic District	Waynesboro Historic District	March 25, 2009 (#09000153)	Roughly bounded by Walker Street, 12th Street, Waters Street, Corker Row, 4th Street, and Jones Avenue; 33°05′28″N 82°01′00″W	Waynesboro	

== Former listings ==
	Name on the Register	Image	Date listed	Date removed	Location	City or town	Description
1	Haven Memorial Methodist Episcopal Church	Haven Memorial Methodist Episcopal Church	April 12, 1996 (#96000397)	January 2, 2024	Barron St., S of Jct. of Barron and 6th Sts. 33°05′27″N 82°00′42″W	Waynesboro	Destroyed by fire.
