= Georgia State Route 305 =

Highway in Georgia, United States

State Route 305
- SR 305 highlighted in red

Route information
- Maintained by GDOT
- Length: 29.2 mi (47.0 km)
- Existed: 1956–present

Major junctions
- South end: SR 56 in Midville
- SR 24 in Vidette; SR 80 in Saint Clair
- North end: SR 88 in Keysville

Location
- Country: United States
- State: Georgia
- County: Burke

Highway system
- Georgia State Highway System; Interstate; US; State; Special
← SR 304	→ SR 306

State Route 305 (SR 305) is a south–north state highway located in the east central part of the U.S. state of Georgia. It runs entirely within Burke County, with a short section near its northern terminus along the Burke-Jefferson county line.

== Route description ==
SR 305 begins at an intersection with SR 56 in Midville. The route heads north along Jones Street until it leaves Midville. It continues northward, passing through rural parts of western Burke County and the unincorporated communities of Magruder and Rosier, until it meets SR 24 in Vidette. SR 305 continues northward through the unincorporated communities of Gough and St. Clair, where it intersects SR 80. It heads northwest until the roadway runs along the Burke-Jefferson County line. Just after this, it meets its northern terminus, an intersection with SR 88 just south of Keysville.

== History ==
SR 305 was established in 1956 in western Burke County. The route remains unchanged since then.

== Major intersections ==
The entire route is in Burke County.

Location	mi	km	Destinations	Notes
Midville	0.0	0.0	SR 56 (Jones Street) – Swainsboro, Waynesboro	Southern terminus; the "Jones Street" designation continues onto SR 305.
Vidette	15.3	24.6	SR 24 (Main Street) – Louisville, Waynesboro	
Saint Clair	23.1	37.2	SR 80 (George Massey Road) – Wrens, Waynesboro	
Keysville	29.2	47.0	SR 88 (Stapleton Highway, Middle Ground Road) – Wrens, Blythe	Northern terminus; the "Stapleton Highway" designation heads along SR 88 west; the "Middle Ground Road" designation heads along SR 88 east.
1.000 mi = 1.609 km; 1.000 km = 0.621 mi: Route transition
