= John James Jones =

American politician

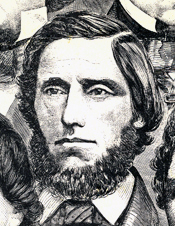
- Jones in 1861

Member of the U.S. House of Representatives from Georgia's 8th district
- In office March 4, 1859 – January 23, 1861
- Preceded by: Alexander H. Stephens
- Succeeded by: Alexander H. Stephens

Personal details
- Born: John James Jones; November 13, 1824 near Waynesboro, Georgia
- Died: October 19, 1898 (aged 73) Waynesboro, Georgia
- Resting place: Magnolia Cemetery, Waynesboro
- Party: Democratic Party
- Education: Oxford College of Emory University
- Profession: lawyer

John James Jones (November 13, 1824 – October 19, 1898) was an American politician and lawyer from the state of Georgia who served in the United States Congress. The John James Jones House is listed on the National Register of Historic Places.

== Early years and education ==
Jones was born near Waynesboro in Burke County, Georgia, in 1824 to Seaborn Henry Jones (1798-1859) and Margaret Walker Jones. He attended Waynesboro Academy and graduated from Emory College in Oxford, Georgia, (current-day) Oxford College of Emory University in 1845. He studied law, gained admittance to the state bar in 1848 and became a practicing attorney in Waynesboro. Jones married Evaline Toombs (1829-1900) and had a son named Seaborn Henry Jones (1861-1921).

== Political service ==
Jones was elected to the United States House of Representatives as a Democrat to represent Georgia's 8th congressional district in the 36th United States Congress; however, he withdrew before the end of his term and served from March 4, 1859, through January 23, 1861.

During the American Civil War, Jones was a lieutenant in the Confederate States Army.

== Later years ==
After the war, Jones returned to the practice of law in Burke County, Georgia. He died in Waynesboro on October 19, 1898, and was buried in the Magnolia Cemetery.

U.S. House of Representatives
Preceded by Alexander Stephens	Member of the U.S. House of Representatives from Georgia's 8th congressional district March 4, 1859 – January 23, 1861	Succeeded by American Civil War
