= Waynesboro Commercial Historic District =

Historic district in Georgia, United States

- U.S. National Register of Historic Places
- U.S. Historic district
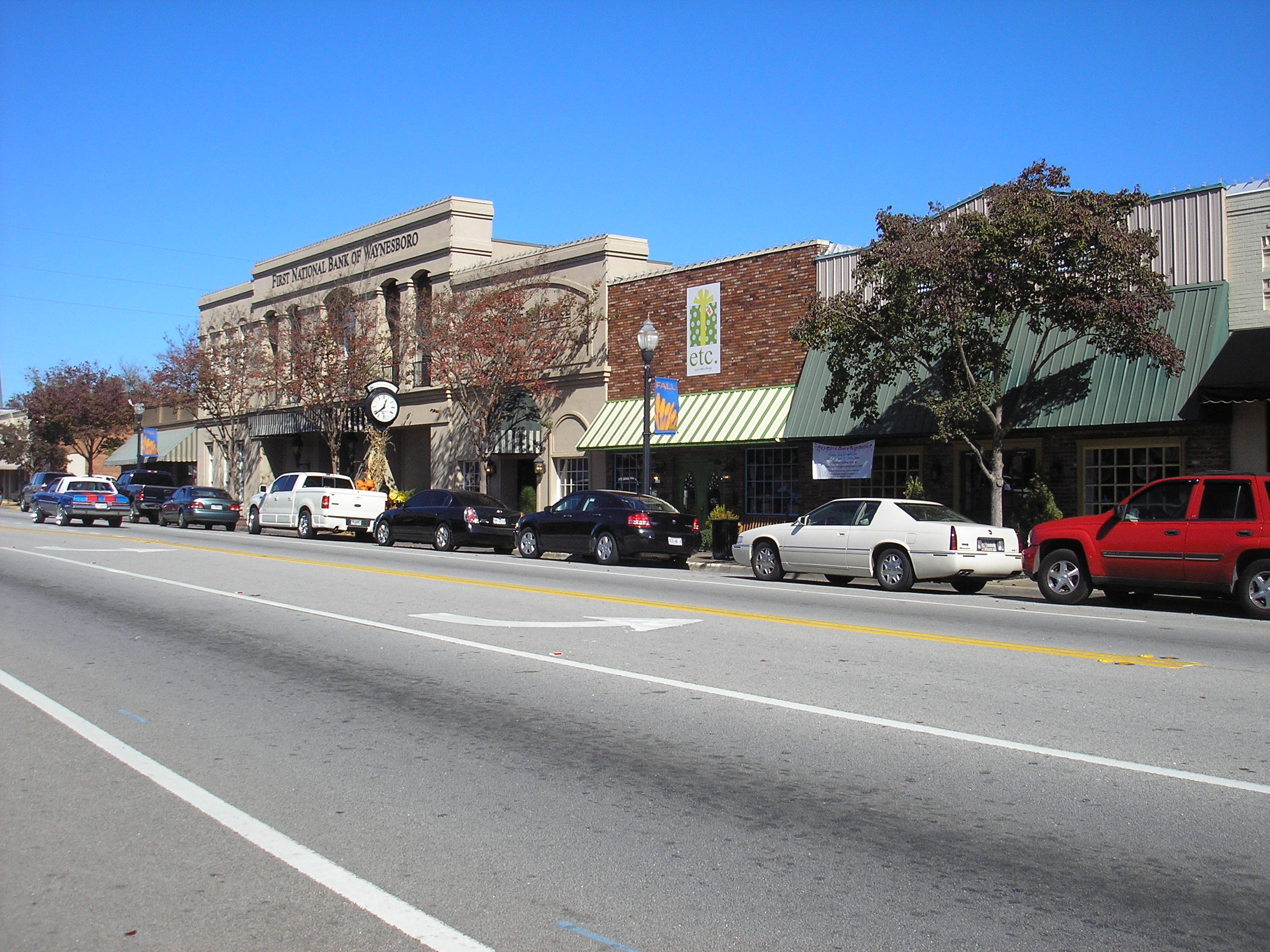

- Location within Georgia
- Location: E. 6th, E. 7th, E. 8th, S. Liberty and Myrick Sts., Waynesboro, Georgia
- Coordinates: 33.191667°N 82.016944°W
- Area: 9 acres (3.6 ha)
- Built: 1880
- Architect: multiple
- Architectural style: Early Commercial, Classical Revival, Bungalow/craftsman
- NRHP reference No.: 93000496
- Added to NRHP: June 10, 1993

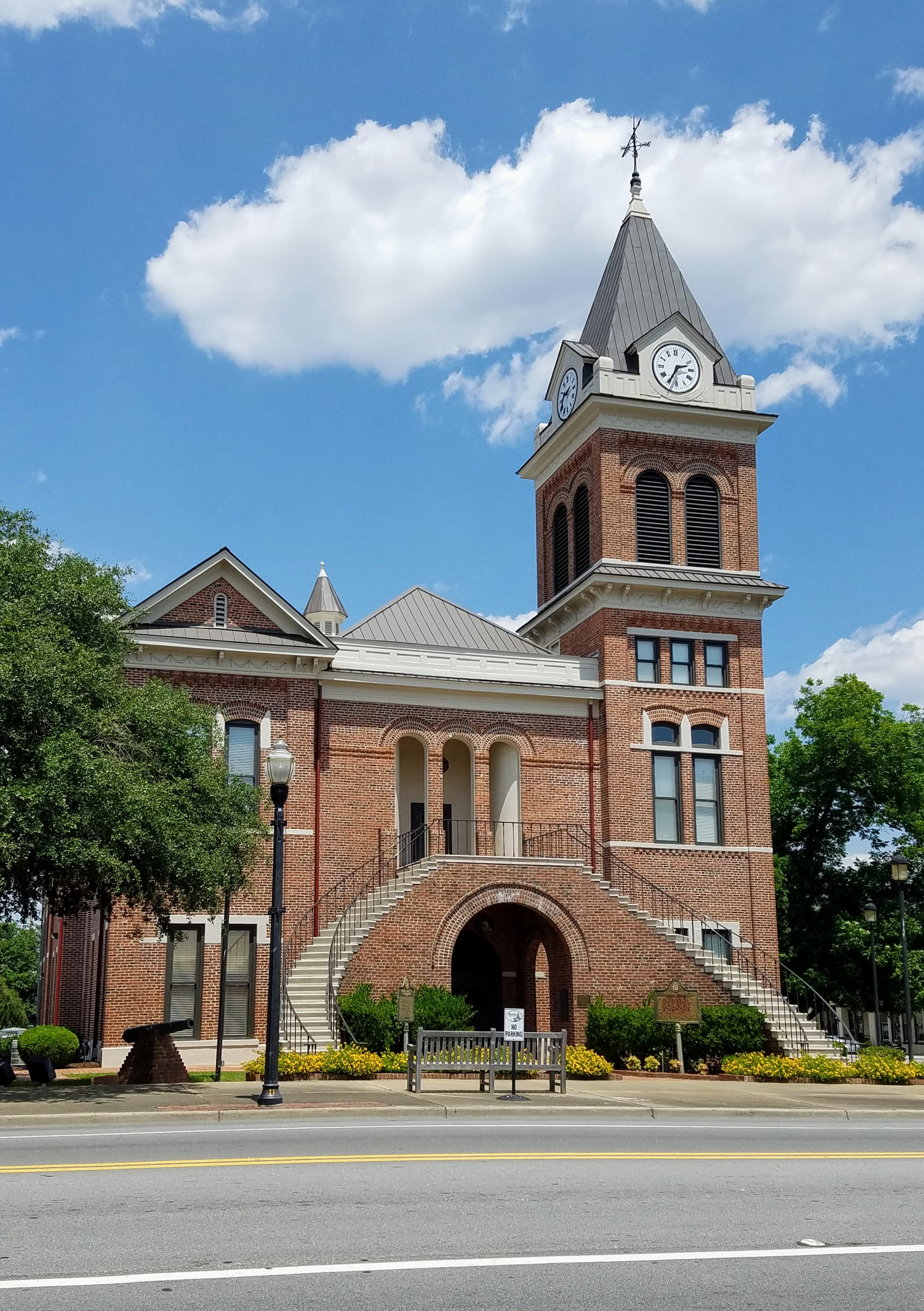
Burke County Courthouse - June 2019

The Waynesboro Commercial Historic District, in Waynesboro in Burke County, Georgia, is a 9-acre (3.6 ha) historic district which was listed on the National Register of Historic Places in 1993. It then included 37 contributing buildings, two contributing structures (a water tower is one of them), and one contributing object, as well as 20 non-contributing buildings.

Much of it consists of continuous rows of commercial storefronts along East 6th Street and north, in a historic commercial core area. There is also the courthouse and its annex on this side of the district, which stand separately. To the south, the historic commercial structures are independent buildings interspersed among historic houses, non-historic buildings, and parking lots, in a more transitional area. In the southeast part of the district there are brick and wooden warehouses and a small brick jail, and the one contributing object: a boulder with a historic bronze marker memorializing a visit of President George Washington. Further south is a neighborhood of historic single-family homes.
