= Burke County School District =

School district in Georgia (U.S. state)

Address
- 789 Burke Veterans Parkway Waynesboro, Georgia, 30830-1268; United States
- Coordinates: 33.093707°N 82.021281°W

District information
- Grades: Pre-school - 12
- Superintendent: Linda S. Bailey

Students and staff
- Enrollment: 4,616
- Faculty: 245

Other information
- Accreditation: Southern Association of Colleges and Schools; Georgia Accrediting Commission
- Fax: (706) 554-8051
- Website: www.burke.k12.ga.us

The Burke County School District is a public school district in Burke County, Georgia, United States, based in Waynesboro.

Its boundary is that of Burke County. It serves the communities of Girard, Keysville, Midville, Vidette, and Waynesboro.

== Schools ==
The Burke County School District has three elementary schools, one middle school, and one high school.

=== Elementary schools ===
- Blakeney Elementary School
- Sardis-Girard-Alexander Elementary School
- Waynesboro Primary School

=== Middle school ===
- Burke County Middle School

=== High school ===
- Burke County High School

=== Alternative school ===
- Burke County Alternative School
