= McCanaan Missionary Baptist Church and Cemetery =

Historic site in Burke County, Georgia

- U.S. National Register of Historic Places
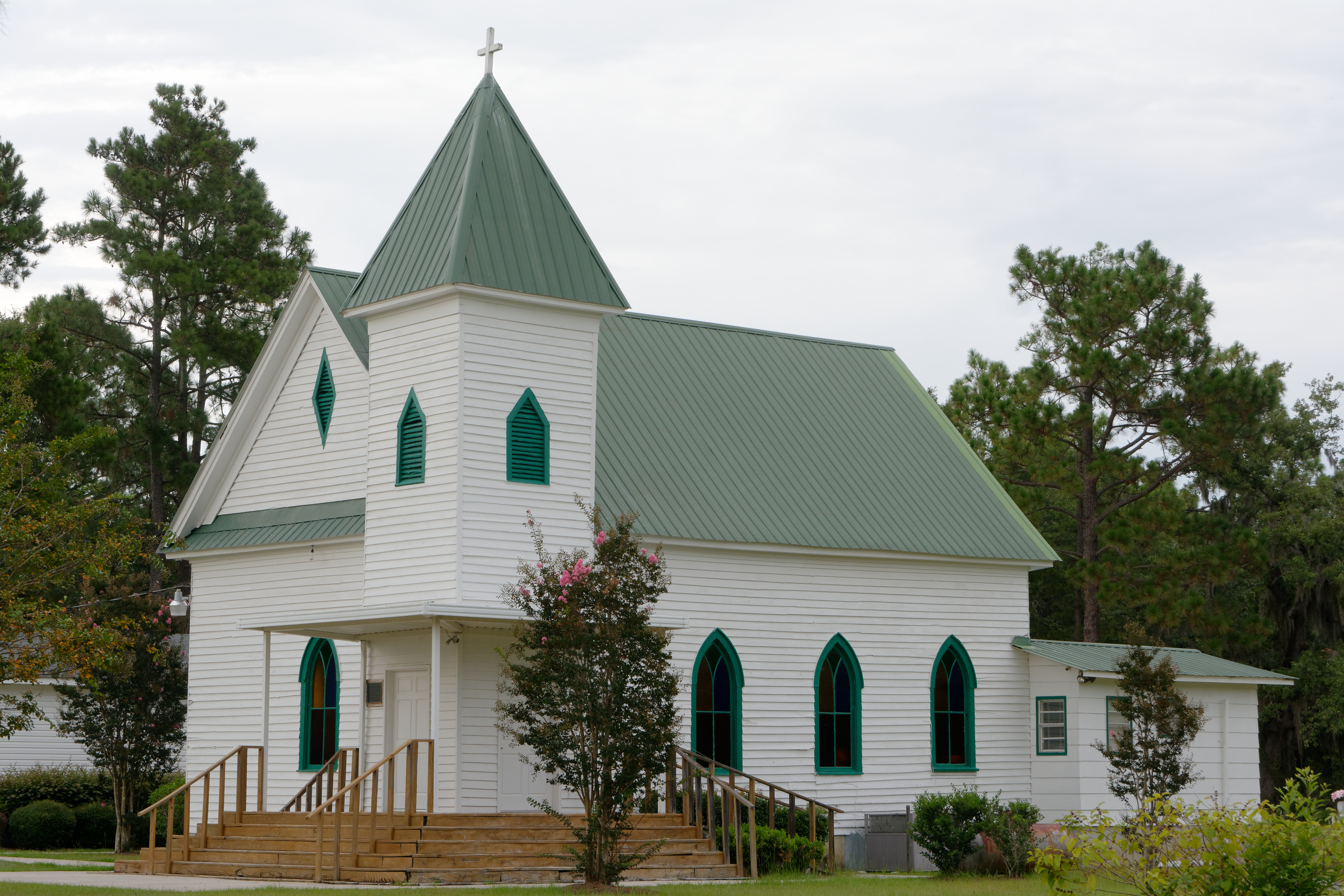

- Location within Georgia
- Location: McCanaan Church Road, or 329 McCanaan Road
- Nearest city: Sardis, Georgia
- Coordinates: 32°59′3″N 81°42′8″W
- Area: 2 acres (0.81 ha)
- Built: 1912
- Architectural style: Rural vernacular with Gothic Revival elements
- NRHP reference No.: 01000643
- Added to NRHP: June 14, 2001

The McCanaan Missionary Baptist Church is an active church in Sardis, Georgia. It serves members in Burke County, Georgia and Screven County, Georgia. Together with its cemetery, it was listed on the National Register of Historic Places in 2001 as McCanaan Missionary Baptist Church and Cemetery.

The church was organized in 1875 by Rev. Frank Cooper, and a small church was built on the current church's site. Its membership included sharecroppers at the Millhaven Plantation in Screven County, Georgia.

The c.1875 church was replaced in the 1890s and the church was again rebuilt in 1912. In the early 1900s a school was built behind the church which served grades one through six. The property has a cemetery that was started in the 1930s, next to the church, after burials at a church-associated original cemetery on Millhaven Plantation (about 4.5 miles away, to the southeast) were ceased. The cemetery has "simple granite markers". Baptisms associated with the church took place in Brier Creek, about one mile to the north.

In its NRHP nomination, the church was deemed significant architecturally as "an excellent example of a rural African-American church with a cemetery" in Georgia, having characteristics identified as typical for the type. It is a wood framed simple building with a church tower and a modest amount of Gothic Revival styling in its windows, gable-ends, and tower.

The Millhaven Plantation was a very large operation.

A history of the church at its 121st anniversary was written by church member Evelyn Williams in 1996. With assistance of Anne Floyd, a historic preservation planner, Williams completed an information form about the property for submission to Georgia's Historic Preservation Division, leading eventually to the listing of the property on the NRHP in 2001.

== See also ==
- National Register of Historic Places listings in Burke County, Georgia
