= Sapp Plantation =

Historic house in Georgia, United States

- U.S. National Register of Historic Places
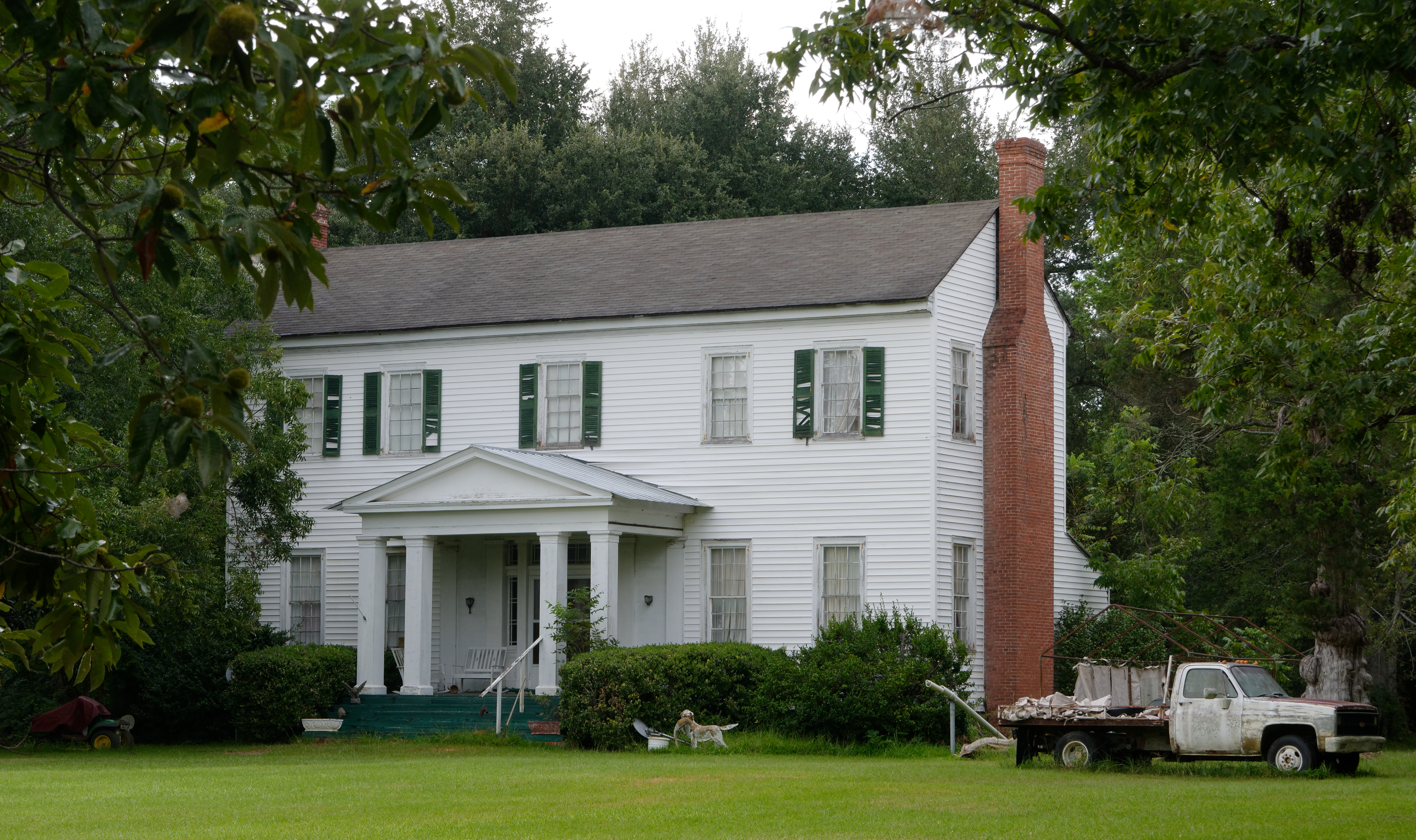
- The house in 2017

- Location within Georgia
- Nearest city: Sardis, Georgia
- Coordinates: 33.00119°N 81.81849°W
- Area: 316.4 acres (128.0 ha)
- Built: 1825
- Architectural style: Plantation Plain
- NRHP reference No.: 80000979
- Added to NRHP: February 8, 1980

Sapp Plantation is a historic plantation located outside of Sardis, Georgia. It was added to the National Register of Historic Places on February 8, 1980, and is located northwest of Sardis on Georgia 24.

Its plantation house was built in the 1820s with mortise-and-tenon construction. It is a two-story building with one-story additions.

== See also ==
- National Register of Historic Places listings in Burke County, Georgia
