= Burke County Courthouse =

Burke County Courthouse may refer to:

- Burke County Courthouse (Georgia), Waynesboro, Georgia
- Burke County Courthouse (North Carolina), Morganton, North Carolina
- Burke County Courthouse (North Dakota), Bowbells, North Dakota
