= Haven Memorial Methodist Episcopal Church =

- Formerly listed on the U.S. National Register of Historic Places
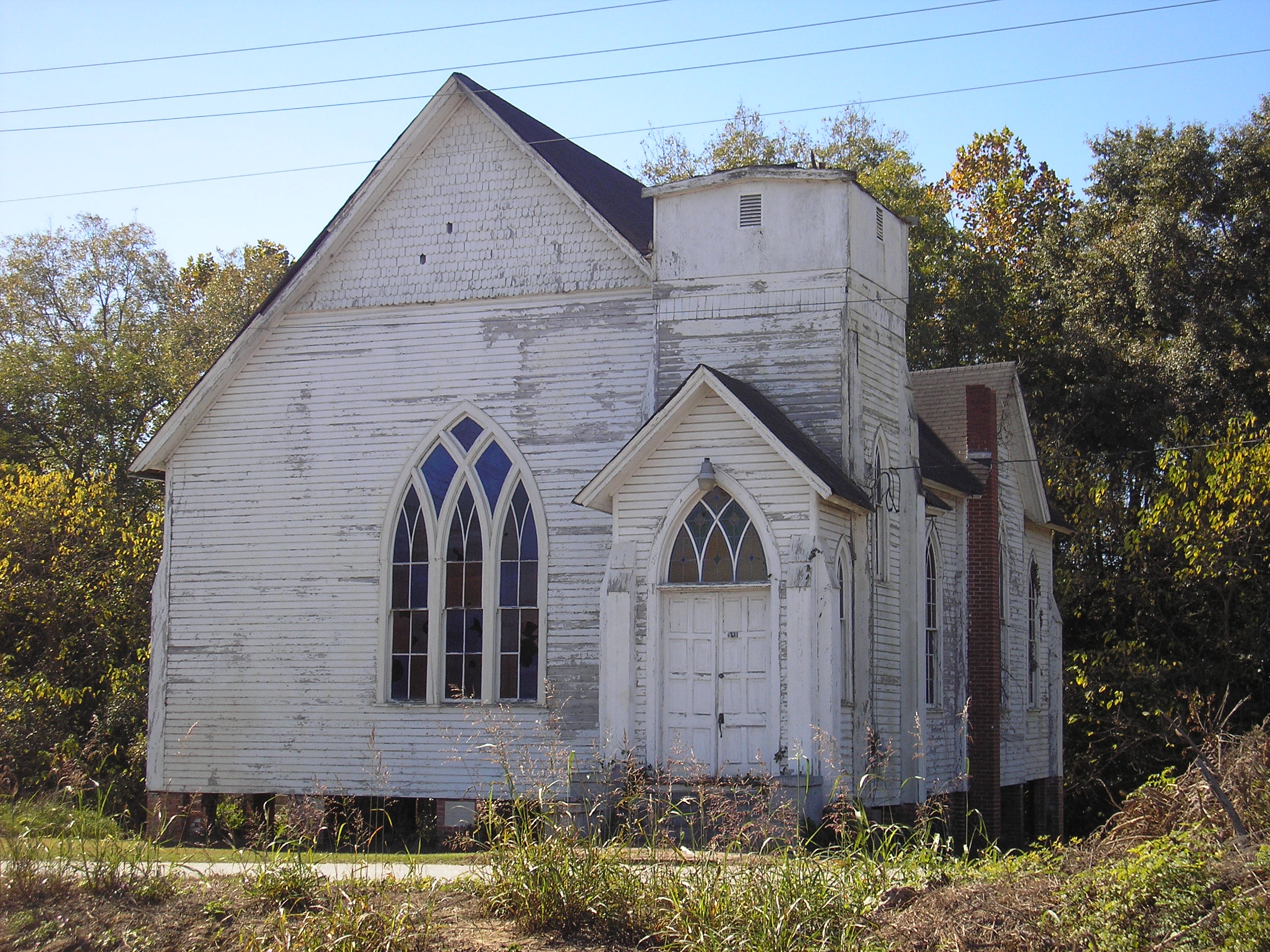

- Location within Georgia
- Location: Barron St., S of Jct. of Barron and 6th Sts., Waynesboro, Georgia
- Coordinates: 33.09085°N 82.01153°W
- Area: less than one acre
- Built: 1888
- Architectural style: Gothic Revival
- NRHP reference No.: 96000397

Significant dates
- Added to NRHP: April 12, 1996
- Removed from NRHP: January 2, 2024

Haven Memorial Methodist Episcopal Church was a historic Gothic Revival-style church in Waynesboro, Georgia, which was founded by former slaves in 1866. Construction of the building began in 1888. It was added to the National Register of Historic Places in 1996, and was delisted in 2024. It was located on Barron Street south of the junction of Barron Street and 6th Street.

The church burned on September 16, 2017, and was a total loss. Sixty-eight-year-old Palmer Crumbley was found inside the burning church and he was arrested and charged with arson in the incident.

== See also ==
- National Register of Historic Places listings in Burke County, Georgia
