= DaVonte Lambert =

American football player (born 1994)

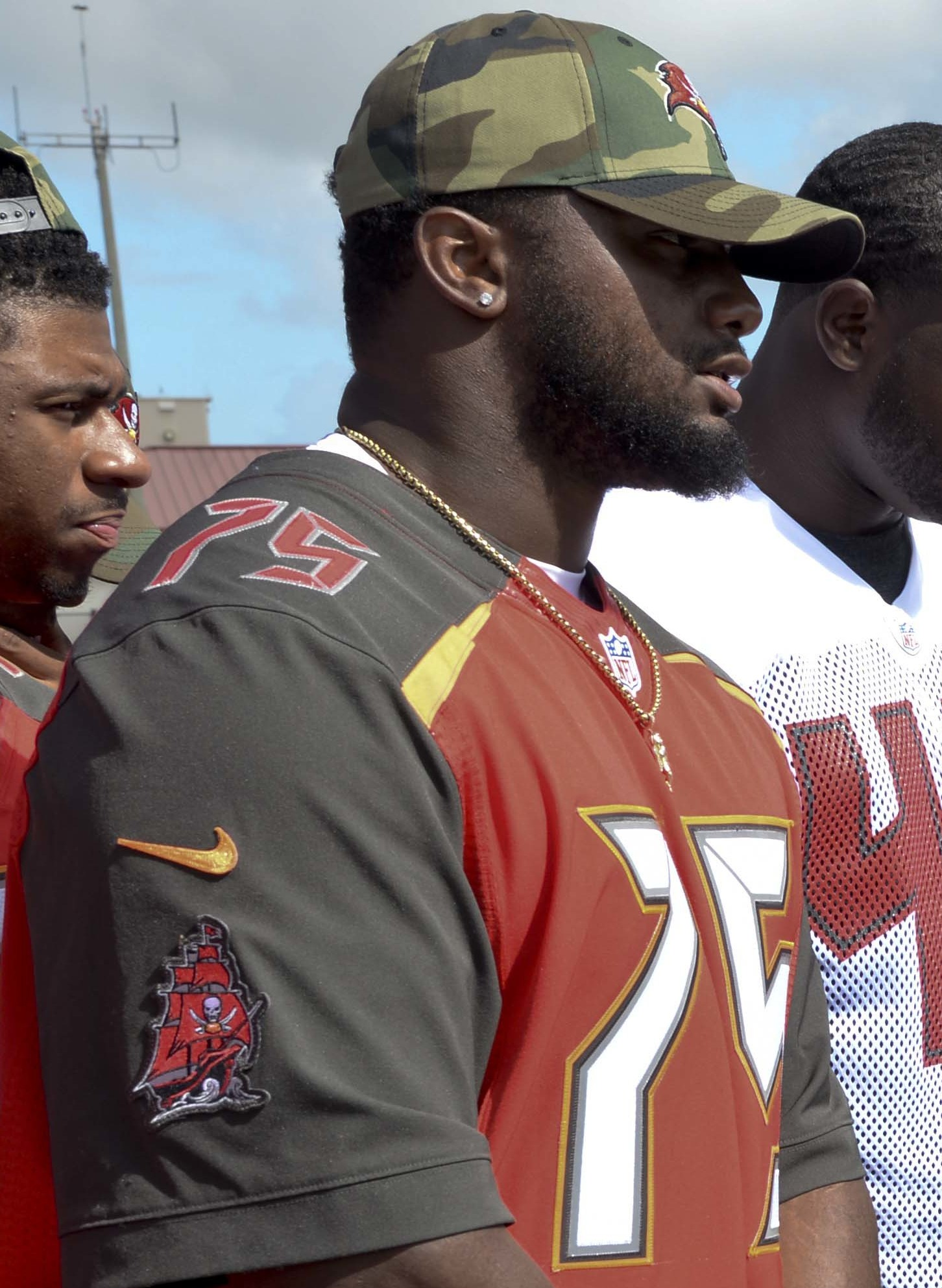
- Lambert with the Tampa Bay Buccaneers in 2016

Profile
- Position: Defensive tackle

Personal information
- Born: June 23, 1994 (age 32); Keysville, Georgia, U.S.
- Listed height: 6 ft 2 in (1.88 m)
- Listed weight: 282 lb (128 kg)

Career information
- High school: Waynesboro (GA) Burke County
- College: Georgia Military, Auburn
- NFL draft: 2016: undrafted

Career history
- Tampa Bay Buccaneers (2016–2017); Albany Empire (2019); St. Louis BattleHawks (2020); Carolina Panthers (2020)*; Arlington Renegades (2023–2025)
- * Offseason or practice squad member only

Awards and highlights
- XFL champion (2023); All-XFL Team (2023); ArenaBowl champion (2019)

Career NFL statistics
- Total tackles: 14
- Forced fumbles: 1
- Stats at Pro Football Reference

DaVonte Lambert (born June 23, 1994) is an American professional football defensive tackle. He played college football at Auburn.

== Professional career ==
Pre-draft measurables
| Height | Weight | Arm length | Hand span | 40-yard dash | 10-yard split | 20-yard split | 20-yard shuttle | Three-cone drill | Vertical jump | Broad jump | Bench press |
|---|---|---|---|---|---|---|---|---|---|---|---|
| 6 ft 1 5/8 in (1.87 m) | 279 lb (127 kg) | 33 1/4 in (0.84 m) | 8 3/8 in (0.21 m) | 4.89 s | 1.73 s | 2.87 s | 4.63 s | 7.67 s | 24.5 in (0.62 m) | 8 ft 10 in (2.69 m) | 20 reps |
All values from Pro Day

=== Tampa Bay Buccaneers ===
Lambert signed with the Tampa Bay Buccaneers as an undrafted free agent following the 2016 NFL draft.

On September 1, 2017, Lambert was placed on injured reserve.

On September 1, 2018, Lambert was waived by the Buccaneers.

=== Albany Empire ===
Lambert was assigned to the Albany Empire of the Arena Football League on June 4, 2019.

=== St. Louis BattleHawks ===
Lambert played with the St. Louis BattleHawks of the XFL in 2020. He had his contract terminated when the league suspended operations on April 10, 2020.

=== Carolina Panthers ===
On April 30, 2020, Lambert signed with the Carolina Panthers. He was waived on August 28, 2020.

=== Arlington Renegades ===
Lambert was named All-XFL team in 2023 with the Arlington Renegades. He re-signed with the team on February 7, 2025, and was released on April 29.
