= Gough, Georgia =

- Unincorporated community Census-designated place
- Location within Georgia
- Coordinates: 33°05′31″N 82°13′35″W
- Country: United States
- State: Georgia
- County: Burke
- Elevation: 400 ft (120 m)

Population (2020)
  - Total: 137
- Time zone: UTC-5 (Eastern (EST))
  - Summer (DST): UTC-4 (EDT)
- ZIP code: 30811
- Area codes: 706 & 762
- GNIS feature ID: 331842

Gough (/ɡɒf/ GOF) is an unincorporated community and census-designated place (CDP) in Burke County, Georgia, United States. The community is located along Georgia State Route 305, 12.2 miles (19.6 km) west of Waynesboro.

Gough was founded in 1905 and was named after J. P. Gough, the site's original owner.

The 2020 Census listed a population of 137.

== Demographics ==
Historical population
Census	Pop.	Note	%±
2020	137		—
U.S. Decennial Census; 2020

Gough first appeared as a census designated place in the 2020 U.S. census.

=== 2020 census ===
Gough CDP, Georgia – racial and ethnic composition Note: the US Census treats Hispanic/Latino as an ethnic category. This table excludes Latinos from the racial categories and assigns them to a separate category. Hispanics/Latinos may be of any race.
Race / ethnicity (NH = Non-Hispanic)	Pop 2020	% 2020
White alone (NH)	33	24.09%
Black or African American alone (NH)	99	72.26%
Native American or Alaska Native alone (NH)	0	0.00%
Asian alone (NH)	0	0.00%
Native Hawaiian or Pacific Islander alone (NH)	0	0.00%
Other race alone (NH)	0	0.00%
Mixed-race or multiracial (NH)	0	0.00%
Hispanic or Latino (any race)	5	3.65%
Total	137	100.00%
