= L. F. Goodrich =

American architect

Lewis Ford Goodrich
- Born: July 8, 1848; Augusta, Georgia
- Died: July 27, 1929 (aged 81); Greensboro, Georgia
- Occupation: Architect

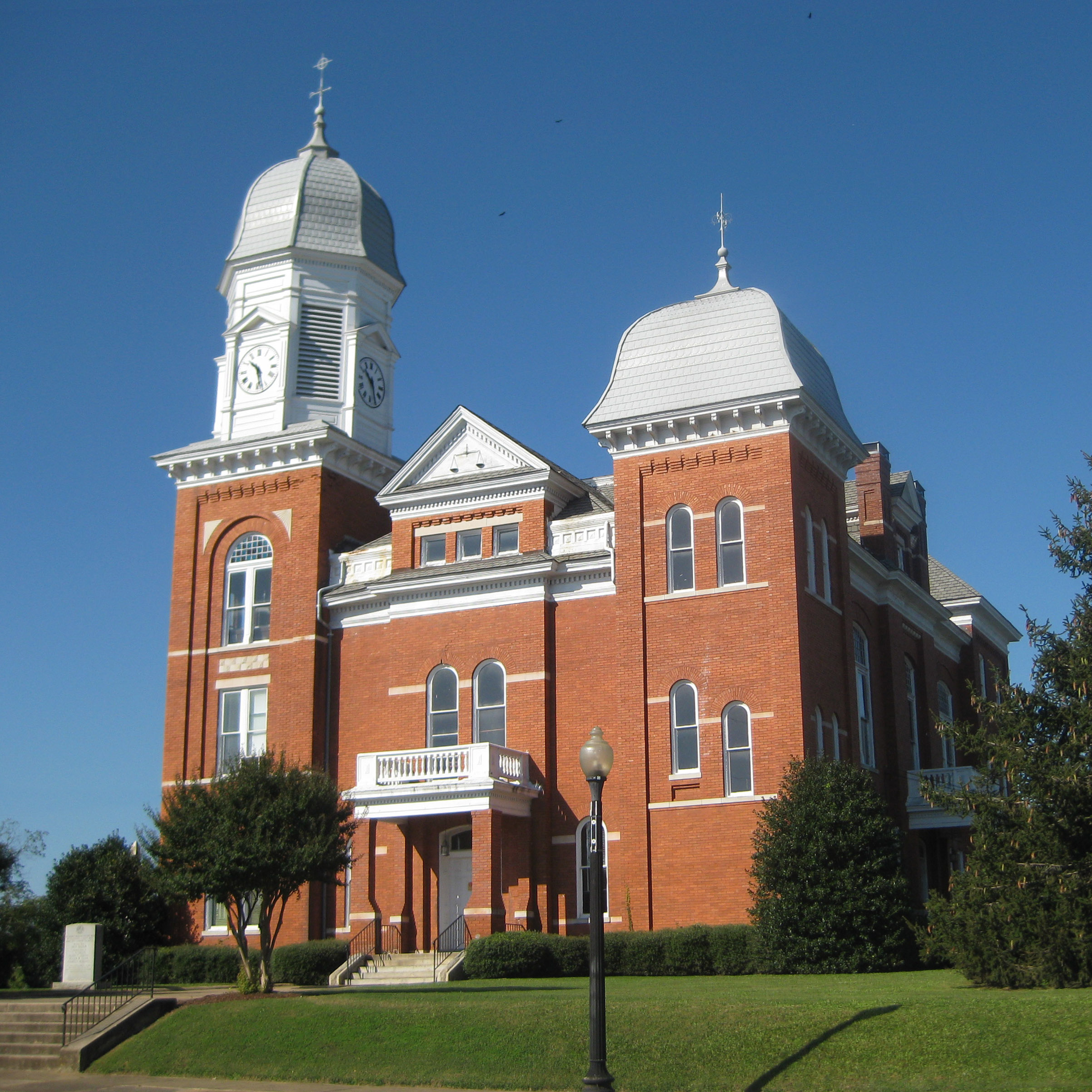
The Taliaferro County Courthouse in Crawfordville, designed by Goodrich and completed in 1902.

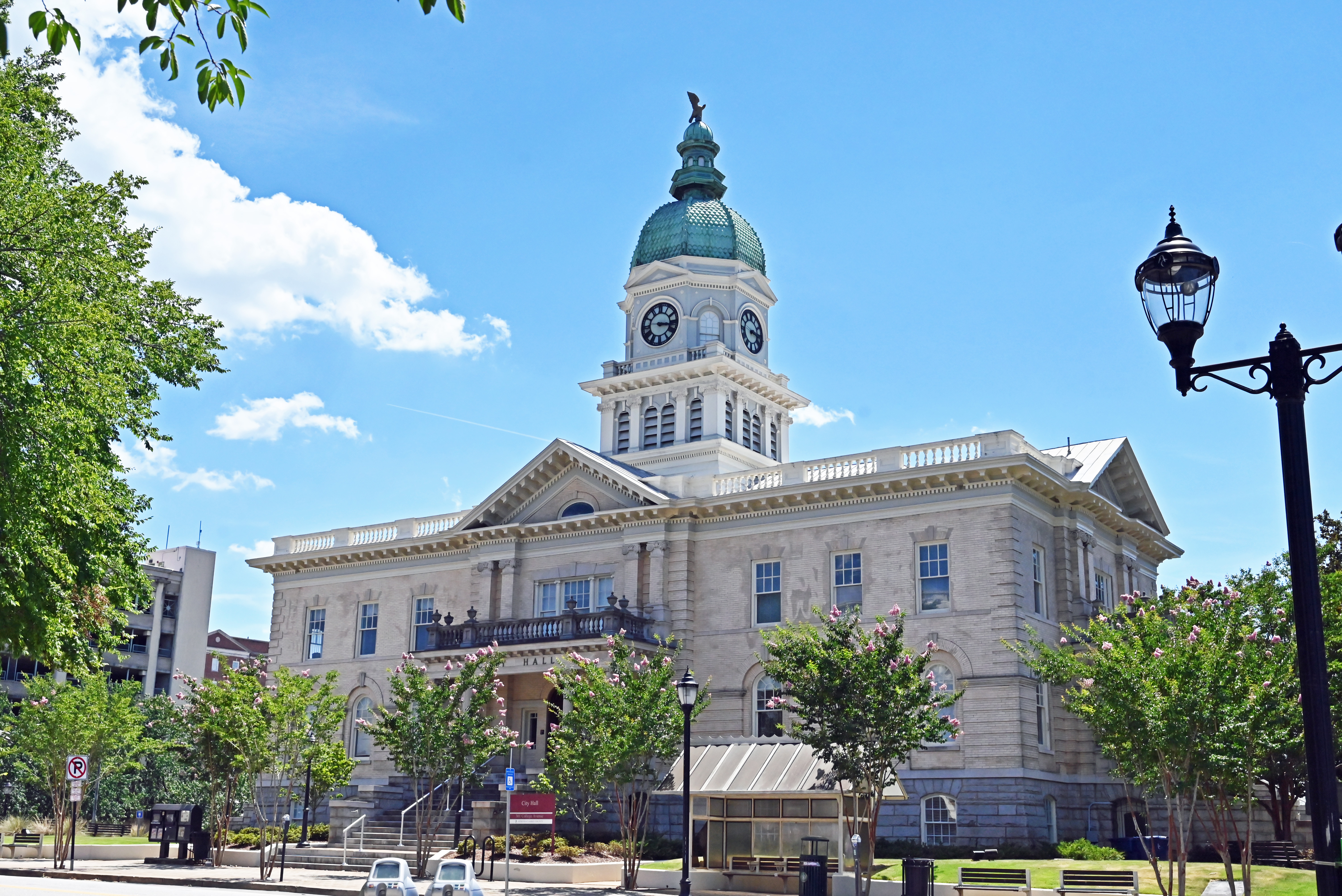
The City Hall in Athens, completed in 1904.

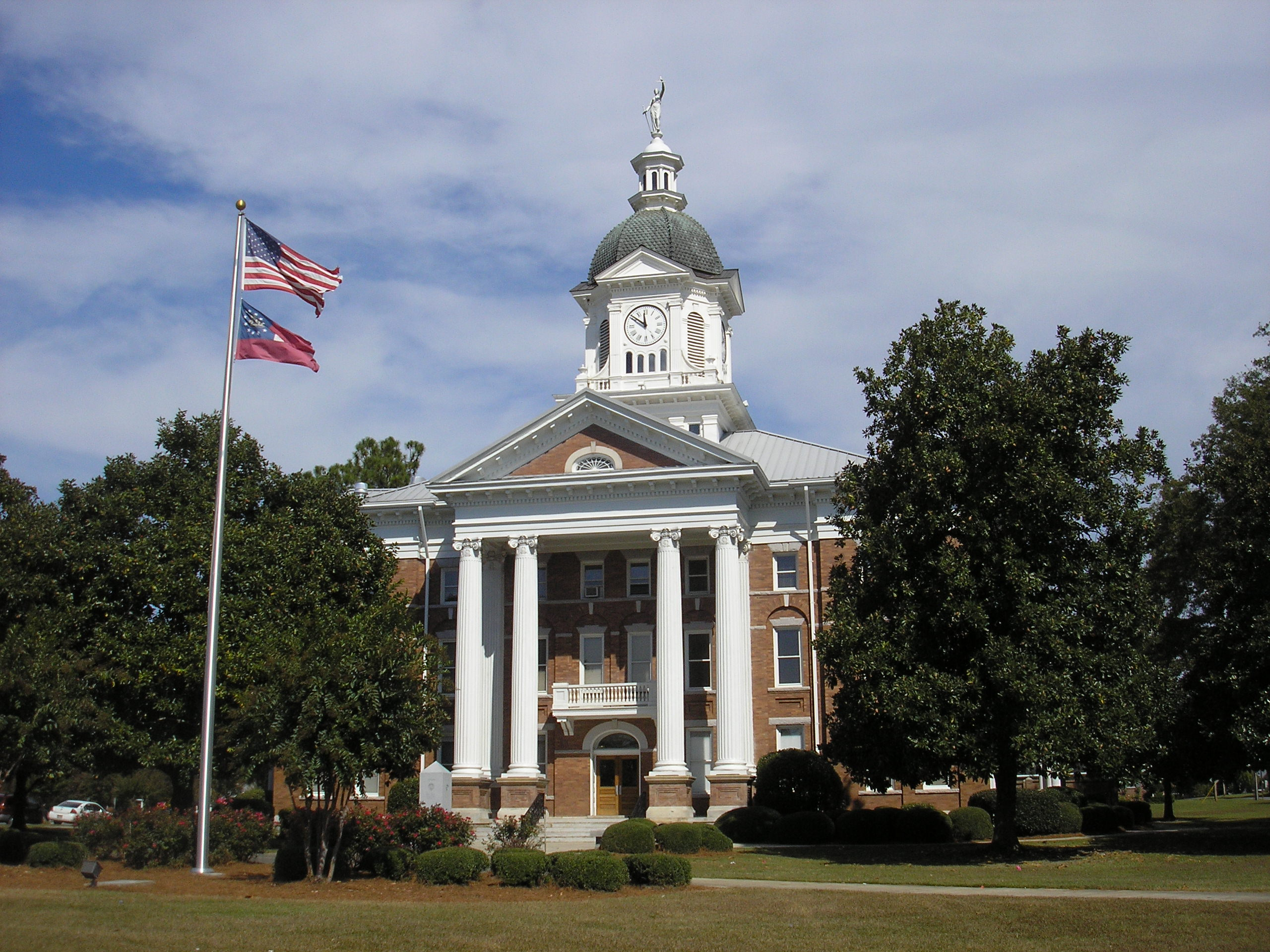
The Jenkins County Courthouse in Millen, completed in 1911.

Lewis F. Goodrich (1848–1929), frequently known as L. F. Goodrich, was an American architect based in Augusta, Georgia. He designed public buildings in Georgia and South Carolina.

== Life and career ==
Lewis Ford Goodrich was born July 8, 1848, in Augusta to William Henry Goodrich, a contractor and builder, (Note: W. H. Goodrich was the builder of the Academy of Richmond County (1856-57, NRHP 1973) and the Gould-Weed House (1860-61, NRHP 1979).) and Susan (Clark) Goodrich. As a young man Goodrich worked variously in the grocery and furniture businesses, but was otherwise associated with his father. After his father's death in 1877, he succeeded to the business. He opened an architect's office in Augusta in 1888. Goodrich's works included a number of county courthouses and the Athens City Hall. By 1913 his chief assistant was Cortez Clark. In December 1915 Goodrich formed the firm of Goodrich, Hoefer & Clark with Clark and former New York City architect Herman W. Hoefer. Hoefer returned north soon after the Augusta fire of 1916, which destroyed their offices, and the firm of Goodrich & Clark continued until the retirement of Goodrich in 1920. Clark then practiced in partnership with J. B. Story into the 1930s.

== Personal life ==
Goodrich was married in 1872 to Lena Walker, who died in 1916. In later life, Goodrich lived in White Plains, Georgia. He died July 27, 1929.

== Legacy ==
In 1892 Goodrich was among the organizers of the Southern Chapter of the American Institute of Architects. He was the chapter's first vice president, and its second president. The chapter faltered and was inactive from 1896, but is seen as a major step in the professionalization of architecture in the South.

At least seven buildings designed or renovated by Goodrich have been listed on the United States National Register of Historic Places, and another contributes to a listed historic district.

== Architectural works ==
- Engine Company Number One, 452 Ellis St, Augusta, Georgia (1892, NRHP 1988)
- John W. Morrah house, (Note: A contributing property to the Mount Carmel Historic District, NRHP-listed in 1982.) 195 State Rd S-33-303, Mount Carmel, South Carolina (1896)
- Bamberg County Courthouse, 444 2nd St, Bamberg, South Carolina (1897, altered 1950)
- Screven County Courthouse, S Main St, Sylvania, Georgia (1897, demolished 1965)
- Burke County Courthouse remodeling, 602 N Liberty St, Waynesboro, Georgia (1899–1900, NRHP 1980)
- Washington County Courthouse remodeling, 132 W Haynes St, Sandersville, Georgia (1899, NRHP 1980)
- Taliaferro County Courthouse, 113 Monument St, Crawfordville, Georgia (1901–02, NRHP 1980)
- Athens City Hall, 301 College Ave, Athens, Georgia (1903–04)
- John Milledge School, 1835 Walker St, Augusta, Georgia (1908, demolished)
- Jenkins County Courthouse, 611 E Winthrope Ave, Millen, Georgia (1910–11, NRHP 1980)
- Emanuel County Sheriff Department, 101 N Main St, Swainsboro, Georgia (1912, NRHP 1995)
- Houghton School (former), 333 Greene St, Augusta, Georgia (1916–17)
- Emanuel County Courthouse, 101 N Main St, Swainsboro, Georgia (1919–20, burned 1938)
