= Waynesboro Historic District =

Historic district in Georgia, United States

- Waynesboro
- U.S. National Register of Historic Places
- U.S. Historic district
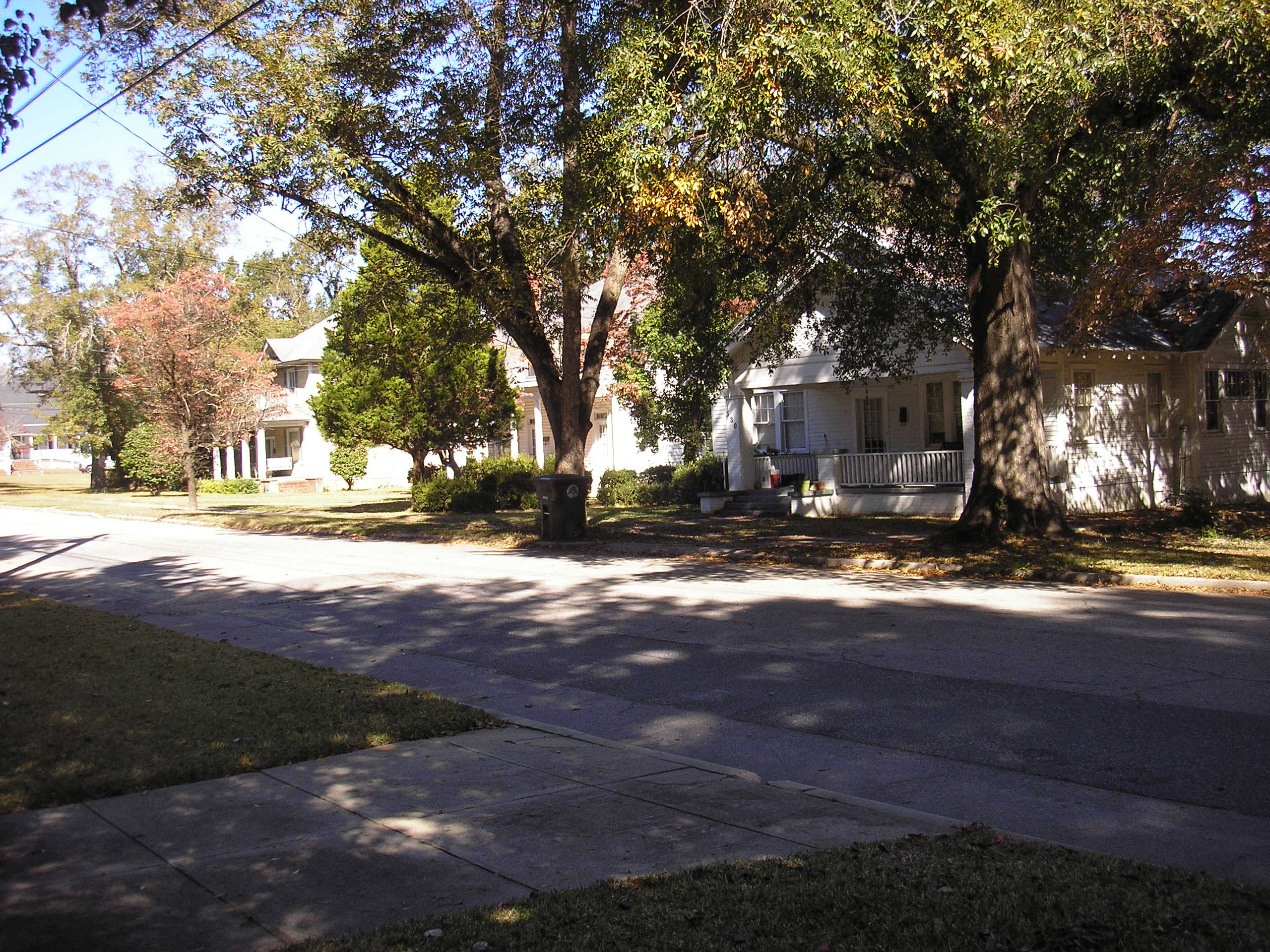

- Location within Georgia Location within the United States
- Location: Waynesboro, Georgia
- Coordinates: 33°05′28″N 82°01′00″W
- Area: approx. 435 acres
- NRHP reference No.: 09000153
- Added to NRHP: March 25, 2009

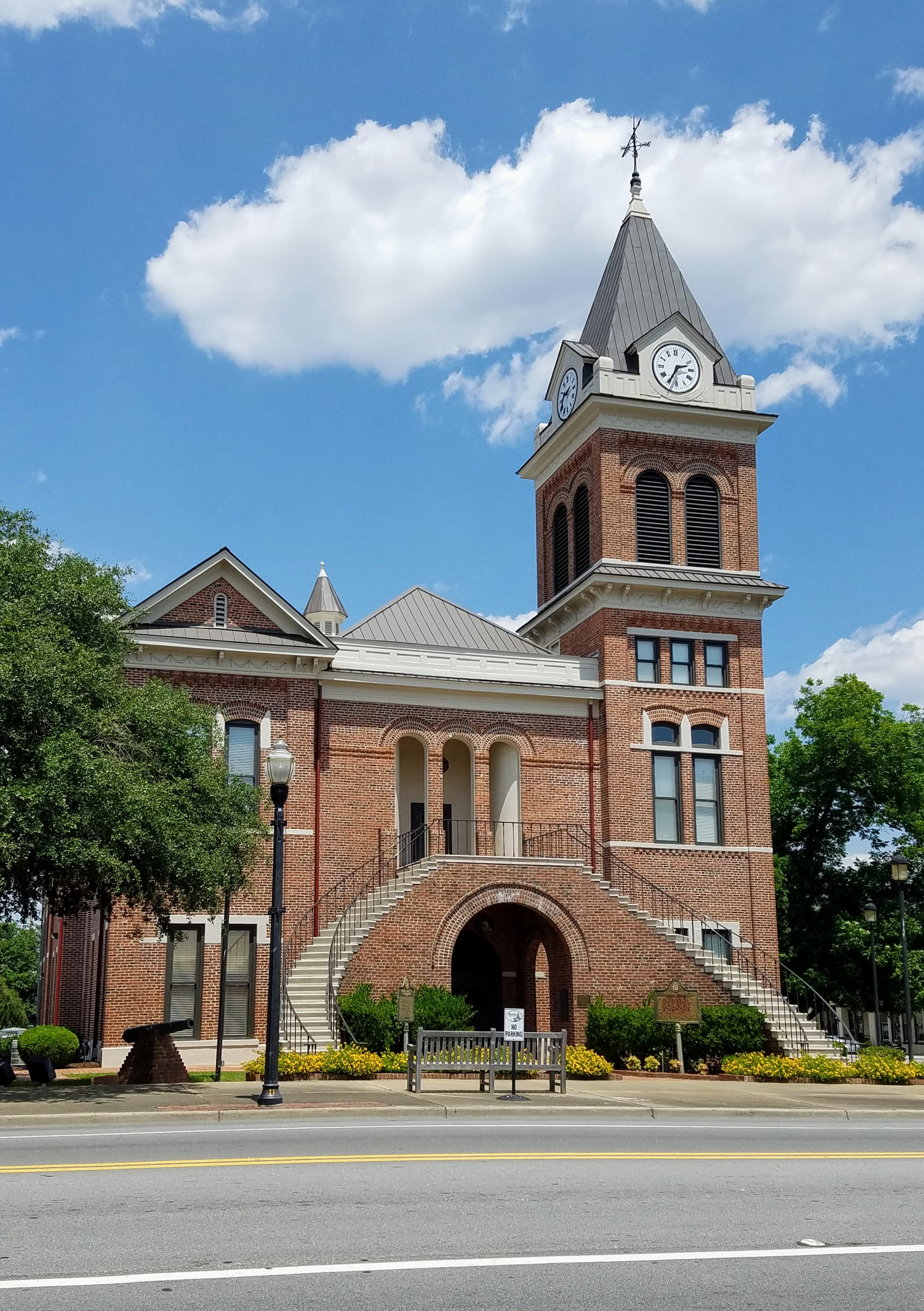
Burke County Courthouse - June 2019

The Waynesboro Historic District in Waynesboro, Georgia, is made up of 486 contributing buildings, sites and structures. It was listed on the National Register of Historic Places on March 25, 2009. The district is notable for its architecture and the roles it played in community planning and development, commerce, industry, politics/government and black ethnic heritage. It includes the previously separately listed John James Jones House, Waynesboro Commercial Historic District and the Haven Memorial Methodist Episcopal Church, as well as the "carpenter Romanesque" Burke County Courthouse, which was part of the multiple property submission County Courthouses in Georgia. The district was the featured listing in the National Park Service's weekly list of April 3, 2009.
