= Hopeful Baptist Church =

- U.S. National Register of Historic Places
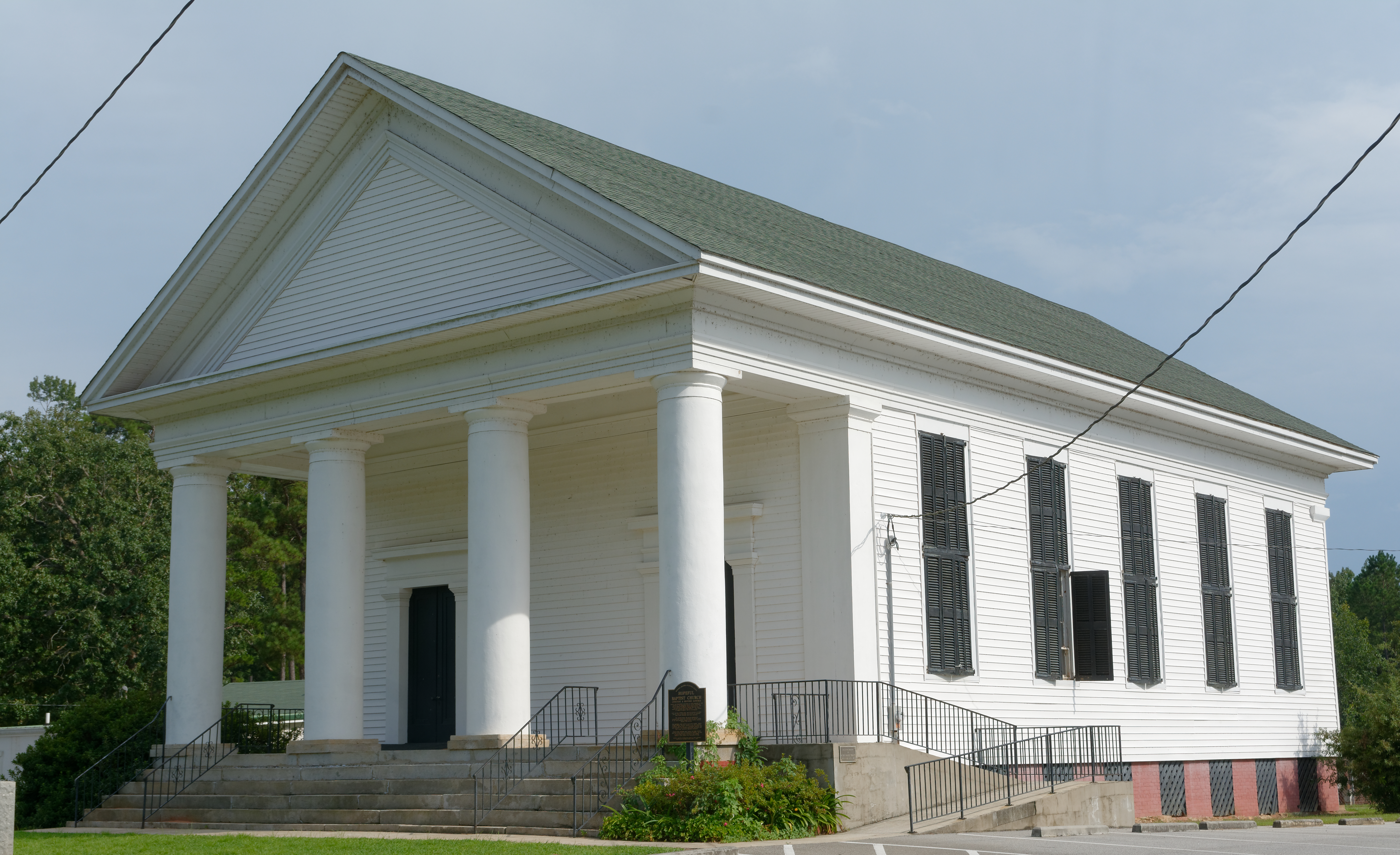

- Location within Georgia
- Nearest city: Keysville, Georgia
- Coordinates: 33.20959°N 82.13403°W
- Area: 9.3 acres (3.8 ha)
- Built: 1850–51
- Architectural style: Greek Revival
- NRHP reference No.: 92001734
- Added to NRHP: January 11, 1993

Hopeful Baptist Church is a historic church in Keysville, Georgia. It was added to the National Register of Historic Places on January 11, 1993. It is located on Winter Road east of the junction with Blythe Road.

It is a classic Greek Revival, monumental, temple-like building built during 1850–51, and the church is notable for having both white and black members, before the American Civil War.

It is made of George longleaf yellow pine (heart pine), on a brick foundation. It has four masonry front porch columns supporting a large pediment in the front gable. It has an entablature and pilasters and two door openings in the front (north-facing) facade. It has five windows on each side and two on the south end, all windows being original, large 16-pane over 16-pane windows.

== See also ==
- National Register of Historic Places listings in Burke County, Georgia
