= Blythe, Georgia =

- City
- Location in Richmond County and the state of Georgia

- Location within the state of Georgia Location within the USA
- Coordinates: 33°17′41″N 82°12′2″W
- Country: United States
- State: Georgia
- County: Richmond,

Area
  - Total: 2.86 sq mi (7.41 km^{2})
  - Land: 2.85 sq mi (7.39 km^{2})
  - Water: 0.0077 sq mi (0.02 km^{2})
- Elevation: 453 ft (138 m)

Population (2020)
  - Total: 744
  - Density: 260.9/sq mi (100.72/km^{2})
- Time zone: UTC-5 (Eastern (EST))
  - Summer (DST): UTC-4 (EDT)
- ZIP code: 30805
- Area code: 706
- FIPS code: 13-09040
- GNIS feature ID: 0354797
- Website: cityofblythega.com

Blythe is a city in Richmond County in the U.S. state of Georgia. As of the 2020 census, the city had a population of 744. It is part of the Augusta, Georgia metropolitan area.

== Geography ==
Blythe is located at 33°17′41″N 82°12′2″W (33.294858, -82.200623). According to the United States Census Bureau, the city has a total area of 2.8 square miles (7.3 km^{2}), of which, 2.8 square miles (7.3 km^{2}) is land and 0.35% is water.

== Demographics ==
Historical population
| Census | Pop. | Note | %± |
|---|---|---|---|
| 1930 | 209 | | — |
| 1940 | 181 | | −13.4% |
| 1950 | 268 | | 48.1% |
| 1960 | 172 | | −35.8% |
| 1970 | 333 | | 93.6% |
| 1980 | 367 | | 10.2% |
| 1990 | 300 | | −18.3% |
| 2000 | 718 | | 139.3% |
| 2010 | 721 | | 0.4% |
| 2020 | 744 | | 3.2% |
U.S. Decennial Census

=== Racial and ethnic composition ===
Blythe city, Georgia – racial and ethnic composition Note: the US Census treats Hispanic/Latino as an ethnic category. This table excludes Latinos from the racial categories and assigns them to a separate category. Hispanics/Latinos may be of any race.
| Race / ethnicity (NH = Non-Hispanic) | Pop 2000 | Pop 2010 | Pop 2020 | % 2000 | % 2010 | % 2020 |
|---|---|---|---|---|---|---|
| White alone (NH) | 576 | 567 | 526 | 80.22% | 78.64% | 70.70% |
| Black or African American alone (NH) | 102 | 101 | 109 | 14.21% | 14.01% | 14.65% |
| Native American or Alaska Native alone (NH) | 1 | 3 | 8 | 0.14% | 0.42% | 1.08% |
| Asian alone (NH) | 0 | 4 | 0 | 0.00% | 0.55% | 0.00% |
| Native Hawaiian or Pacific Islander alone (NH) | 0 | 0 | 0 | 0.00% | 0.00% | 0.00% |
| Other race alone (NH) | 0 | 1 | 0 | 0.00% | 0.14% | 0.00% |
| Mixed-race or rultiracial (NH) | 16 | 14 | 28 | 2.23% | 1.94% | 3.76% |
| Hispanic or Latino (any race) | 23 | 31 | 73 | 3.20% | 4.30% | 9.81% |
| Total | 718 | 721 | 744 | 100.00% | 100.00% | 100.00% |

=== 2020 census ===
As of the 2020 United States census, there were 744 people, 224 households, and 160 families residing in the city.

In 2024 the Blythe population by county breakdown was as follows: 694 in Richmond County and 27 in Burke County. In another count that year, the Richmond County population was same while the Burke County population was 50.

== Education ==
The majority of the city, in Richmond County, is in the Richmond County School System. Blythe Elementary School is in Blythe and is under that district.

The portion in Burke County is in the Burke County School District. Burke County Middle School is the district's middle school, and Burke County High School is the comprehensive high school of that district.

== Notable people ==
- Nat Dye, former Canadian Football League player
- Pat Dye, former college football coach and Auburn University athletic director 1981–1991

== See also ==
- Central Savannah River Area
