= Drone, Georgia =

- Unincorporated community
- Location within the state of Georgia Drone, Georgia (the United States)
- Coordinates: 33°03′20″N 82°09′31″W
- Country: United States
- State: Georgia
- County: Burke
- Elevation: 331 ft (101 m)
- Time zone: UTC-5 (Eastern (EST))
  - Summer (DST): UTC-4 (EDT)
- Area codes: 706 & 762
- GNIS ID: 355551

Drone is an unincorporated community in Burke County, Georgia, United States.
