= Saint Clair, Georgia =

Unincorporated community in Georgia, U.S.

Coordinates: 33°09′04″N 82°13′04″W

Saint Clair (also Kilpatrick Estate) is an unincorporated community in Burke County, in the U.S. state of Georgia.

== History ==
A post office called Saint Clair was established in 1832, and remained in operation until 1939. The community most likely was named after Arthur St. Clair (1737–1818), a U.S. revolutionary general.
