= John James Jones House =

Historic house in Georgia, United States

- U.S. National Register of Historic Places
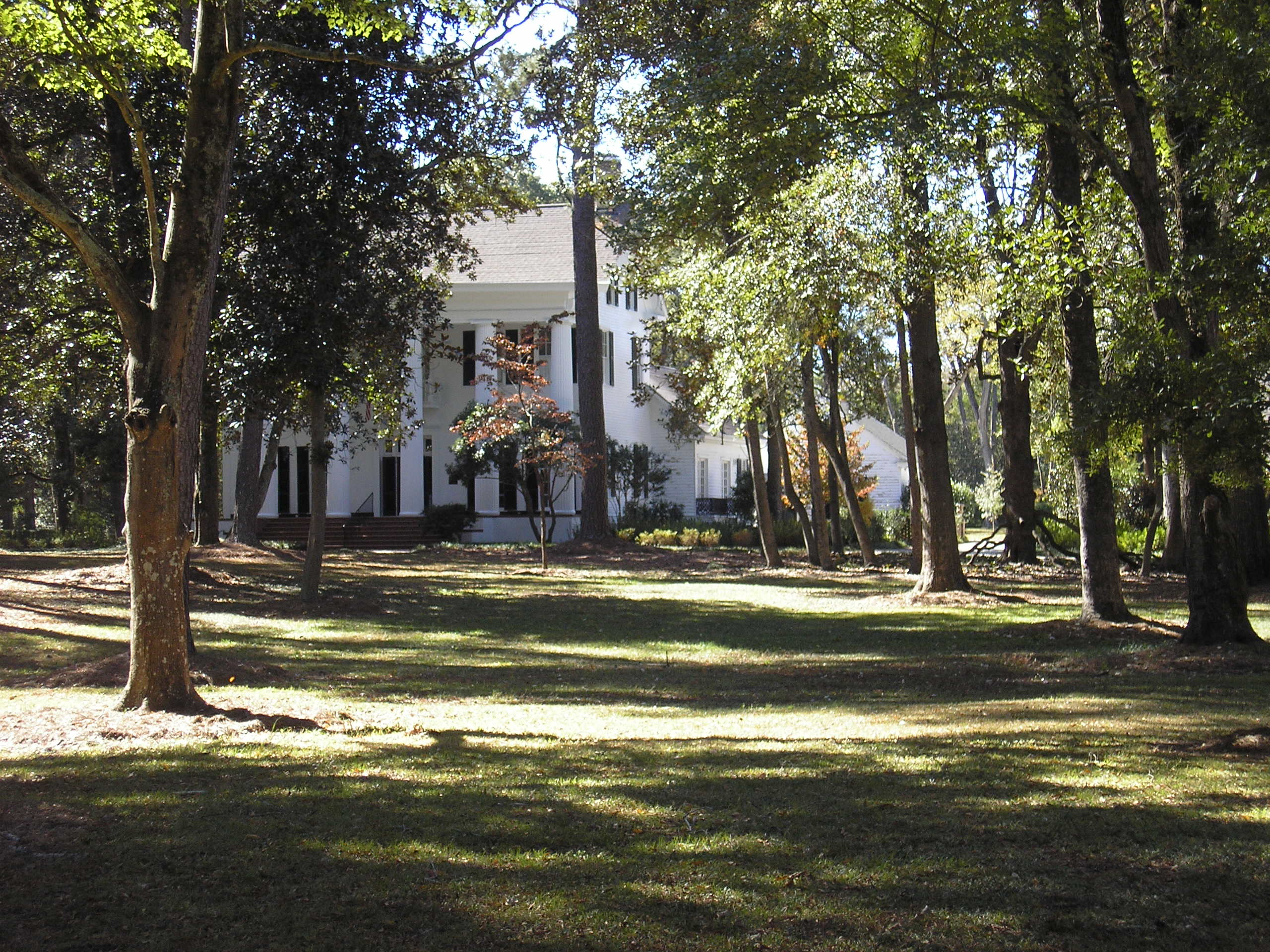

- Location within Georgia
- Location: 525 Jones Ave., Waynesboro, Georgia
- Coordinates: 33.08636°N 82.01847°W
- Area: 6.6 acres (2.7 ha)
- Built: 1876
- Architectural style: Late Victorian, Greek Revival
- NRHP reference No.: 80000981
- Added to NRHP: February 15, 1980

John James Jones House (also known as Jones-Cox House and as The Shadows) is a historic house located at 525 Jones Avenue in Waynesboro, Georgia.

== Description and history ==
The two-story house is a mix of Greek Revival and Victorian architecture. The home was built for John James Jones. It was added to the National Register of Historic Places on February 15, 1980.

== See also ==
- National Register of Historic Places listings in Burke County, Georgia
