= Vidette, Georgia =

- City
- Location in Burke County and the state of Georgia
- Coordinates: 33°2′13″N 82°14′55″W
- Country: United States
- State: Georgia
- County: Burke

Area
  - Total: 0.97 sq mi (2.52 km^{2})
  - Land: 0.97 sq mi (2.52 km^{2})
  - Water: 0 sq mi (0.00 km^{2})
- Elevation: 351 ft (107 m)

Population (2020)
  - Total: 103
  - Density: 105.8/sq mi (40.85/km^{2})
- Time zone: UTC-5 (Eastern (EST))
  - Summer (DST): UTC-4 (EDT)
- FIPS code: 13-79416
- GNIS feature ID: 0324706

Vidette is a city in Burke County, Georgia, United States. The population was 103 in 2020. It is part of the Augusta, Georgia metropolitan area. It is located along the crossroads of State Routes 24 and 305.

== History ==
The Georgia General Assembly incorporated Vidette as a town in 1908. The town has the name of one Dr. Vidette.

== Geography ==
Vidette is located in western Burke County at 33°2′13″N 82°14′55″W, 14 miles (23 km) west of Waynesboro, the county seat.

According to the United States Census Bureau, the city has a total area of 1.0 square mile (2.6 km^{2}), all land.

== Demographics ==
Historical population
Census	Pop.	Note	%±
1910	75		—
1920	569		658.7%
1930	202		−64.5%
1940	160		−20.8%
1950	159		−0.6%
1960	103		−35.2%
2000	112		—
2010	112		0.0%
2020	103		−8.0%
U.S. Decennial Census; 1850-1870 1880; 1890-1910 1920-1930; 1930-1940 1940-1950; 1960-1980 1980-2000

As of the 2010 United States census, there were 112 people living in the city. In 2020, its population declined to 103.

=== Racial and ethnic composition ===
Vidette city, Georgia – Racial and ethnic composition Note: the US Census treats Hispanic/Latino as an ethnic category. This table excludes Latinos from the racial categories and assigns them to a separate category. Hispanics/Latinos may be of any race.
Race / Ethnicity (NH = Non-Hispanic)	Pop 2000	Pop 2010	Pop 2020	% 2000	% 2010	% 2020
White alone (NH)	63	75	72	56.25%	66.96%	69.90%
Black or African American alone (NH)	40	31	18	35.71%	27.68%	17.48%
Native American or Alaska Native alone (NH)	0	0	0	0.00%	0.00%	0.00%
Asian alone (NH)	0	2	0	0.00%	1.79%	0.00%
Native Hawaiian or Pacific Islander alone (NH)	0	0	0	0.00%	0.00%	0.00%
Other race alone (NH)	0	0	0	0.00%	0.00%	0.00%
Mixed race or Multiracial (NH)	3	3	5	2.68%	2.68%	4.85%
Hispanic or Latino (any race)	6	1	8	5.36%	0.89%	7.77%
Total	112	112	103	100.00%	100.00%	100.00%

== See also ==
- Central Savannah River Area
