= Burke County High School =

Public high school in Waynesboro, Georgia, United States

Location
- 1057 Burke Veterans Parkway; Waynesboro, Georgia 30830; United States; 33°05′07″N 81°59′27″W

Information
- School type: Public high school
- Established: 1987
- School district: Burke County School District
- Superintendent: Rudolph (Rudy) Falana
- CEEB code: 113227
- Principal: Kaveous Preston
- Teaching staff: 77.90 (on an FTE basis)
- Grades: 9–12
- Gender: Co-education
- Enrolment: 1,137 (2023–2024)
- Student to teacher ratio: 14.60
- Colors: Blue, white, black
- Team name: Bears
- Accreditation: Southern Association of Colleges and Schools
- Website: bchs.burke.k12.ga.us

Burke County High School is a public high school located in Waynesboro, Georgia, United States. The school is part of the Burke County School District, which serves Burke County.

In 2011, the Burke County Bears football team won the 3A state championship.

== Notable alumni ==
- Jonathan Broxton, professional baseball player (Los Angeles Dodgers, Kansas City Royals, Cincinnati Reds)
- Cornelius Washington, NFL football player (Chicago Bears)
- DaVonte Lambert, NFL football player (Tampa Bay Buccaneers), (Carolina Panthers)
