= Jenkins County Courthouse =

- U.S. National Register of Historic Places
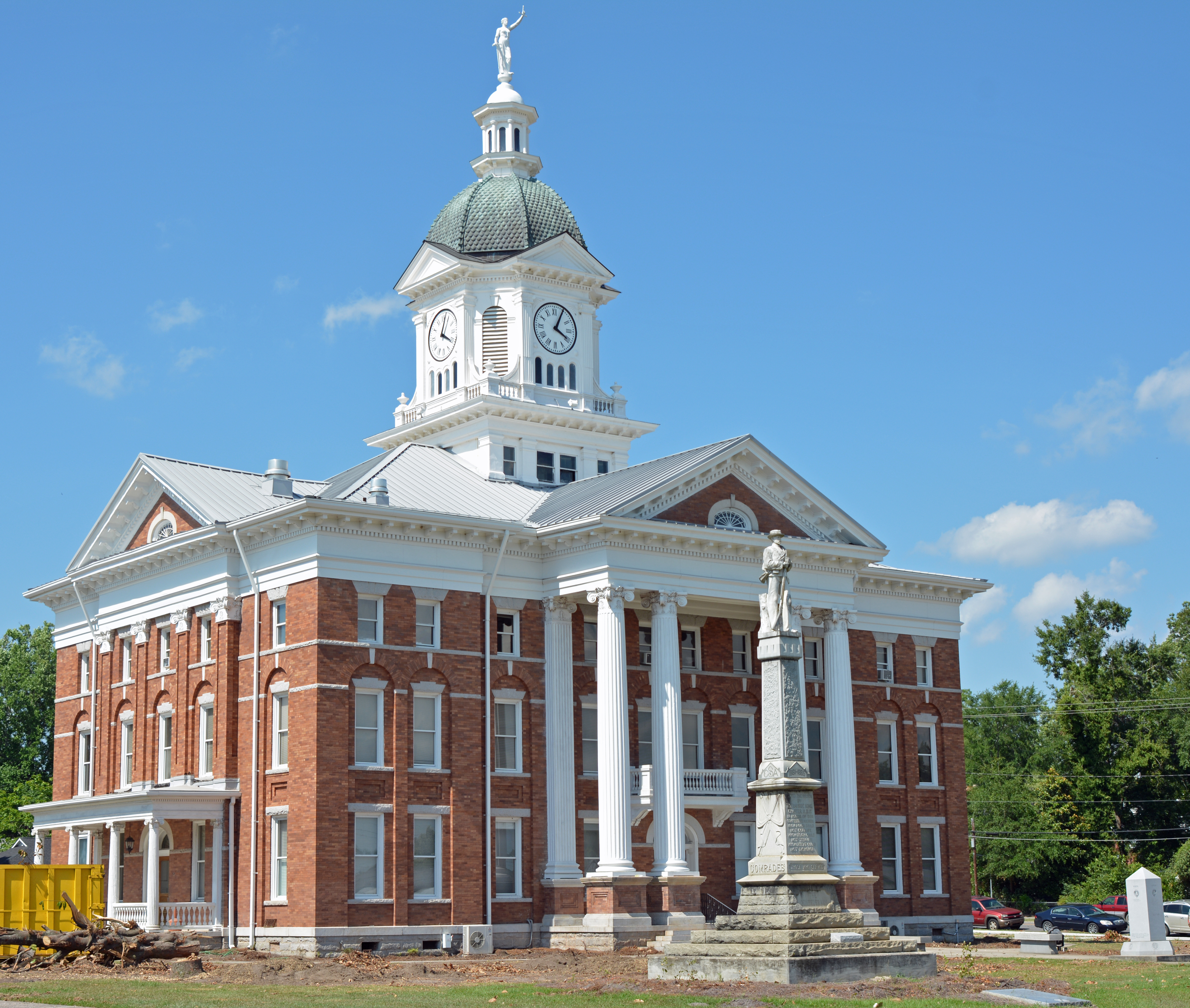
- The courthouse and Confederate Monument in 2016

- Location within Georgia
- Interactive map showing the location of Jenkins County Courthouse
- Location: Courthouse Sq., Millen, Georgia
- Coordinates: 32°48′15″N 81°56′21″W
- Area: 2.5 acres (1.0 ha)
- Built: 1910
- Architect: L.F. Goodrich; Franklin, A.J.
- Architectural style: Classical Revival
- MPS: Georgia County Courthouses TR
- NRHP reference No.: 80001100
- Added to NRHP: September 18, 1980

Jenkins County Courthouse is a historic county courthouse in Millen, Georgia. Designed in a Neoclassical Revival architecture style by L.F. Goodrich, it was built in 1910. Unlike most courthouses in Georgia of the period, this one is three stories tall. It has columns that are plain and fluted, which are on high bases. The building has a bracketed cornice. On top is a copper-domed clock tower. It was added to the National Register of Historic Places on September 18, 1980.

== See also ==
- National Register of Historic Places listings in Jenkins County, Georgia
