= Cornelius Washington =

American football player (born 1989)

Washington Huskies
- Title: Recruiting communications coordinator

Personal information
- Born: September 10, 1989 (age 37); Hephzibah, Georgia, U.S.
- Listed height: 6 ft 4 in (1.93 m)
- Listed weight: 292 lb (132 kg)

Career information
- High school: Waynesboro (GA) Burke Co.
- College: Georgia
- NFL draft: 2013: 6th round, 188th overall pick

Career history

Playing
- Chicago Bears (2013–2016); Detroit Lions (2017)

Coaching
- Washington (2019–present) Recruiting communications coordinator

Career NFL statistics
- Total tackles: 55
- Sacks: 5.5
- Stats at Pro Football Reference

Cornelius Davis Washington (born September 10, 1989) is an American football coach and former defensive end currently recruiting communications coordinator for the Washington Huskies football team. He was selected by the Chicago Bears in the sixth round of the 2013 NFL draft out of Georgia. He also played for the Detroit Lions.

== Early life ==
Washington was a standout athlete for the Waynesboro (GA) Burke Co. track team. He was timed at 10.94 seconds in the 100 meters. He also competed in the shot put, he had a career-best throw of 13.75 meters.

== College career ==
With the Georgia Bulldogs, Washington recorded 76 tackles, 17 tackles-for-loss and 10.5 sacks, while starting 25 of the 51 games he appeared in. During the 2012 SEC Championship Game against Alabama, Washington blocked a field goal, which was recovered by teammate Alec Ogletree, who returned the blocked kick 55 yards for a touchdown.

== Professional career ==
=== Pre-draft ===
Pre-draft measurables
Height	Weight	Arm length	Hand span	40-yard dash	10-yard split	20-yard split	Vertical jump	Broad jump	Bench press
6 ft 4 in (1.93 m)	265 lb (120 kg)	34 in (0.86 m)	9 1/2 in (0.24 m)	4.55 s	1.60 s	2.59 s	39 in (0.99 m)	10 ft 8 in (3.25 m)	36 reps
All values from NFL Scouting Combine

At the combine, Washington led linebackers in the 225-pound bench press with 36 repetitions.

=== Chicago Bears ===
Washington was selected by the Chicago Bears in the sixth-round (188th overall) to play exclusively at left defensive end. He and fifth-round pick Jordan Mills signed four-year contracts with the team on May 1, 2013.

Washington appeared in two games in the 2013 season, both against the Detroit Lions, making his NFL debut on September 29 against the Lions, recording a tackle.

In Week 12 of the 2014 season against the Tampa Bay Buccaneers, Washington recorded his first career sack.

On September 13, 2015, during the regular-season opener against the Green Bay Packers, Washington suffered a season-ending quadriceps injury and was placed on injured reserve.

=== Detroit Lions ===
On March 10, 2017, Washington signed a two-year, $6 million contract with the Detroit Lions. He played in 15 games in 2017, recording a career-high 24 tackles, 2.5 sacks, and three passes defensed.

On August 20, 2018, Washington was released by the Lions.

== NFL career statistics ==
Year	Team	Games		Tackles				Interceptions		Fumbles	
Year	Team	GP	GS	Comb	Solo	Ast	Sack	PD	Int	FF	FR
2013	CHI	2	0	1	1	0	0.0	0	0	0	0
2014	CHI	13	0	9	6	3	1.0	0	0	0	0
2015	CHI	1	0	0	0	0	0.0	0	0	0	0
2016	CHI	15	2	20	14	6	2.0	1	0	0	0
2017	DET	15	2	24	15	9	2.5	3	0	0	0
Career		46	4	54	36	18	5.5	4	0	0	0

== Post-playing career ==
In September 2019, Washington joined the Washington Huskies football team as the Recruiting Communications Coordinator.

== Personal life ==
On June 20, 2014, Washington was arrested for speeding and driving with a suspended license, but was released after paying a fine.
