= Sardis, Georgia =

- City
- Seal

- Location in Burke County and the state of Georgia
- Coordinates: 32°58′28″N 81°45′31″W
- Country: United States
- State: Georgia
- County: Burke
- Named for: Sardis, Turkey

Government
  - Mayor: Roger Lane

Area
  - Total: 1.56 sq mi (4.05 km^{2})
  - Land: 1.55 sq mi (4.01 km^{2})
  - Water: 0.015 sq mi (0.04 km^{2})
- Elevation: 240 ft (73 m)

Population (2020)
  - Total: 995
  - Density: 642.7/sq mi (248.13/km^{2})
- Time zone: UTC-5 (Eastern (EST))
  - Summer (DST): UTC-4 (EDT)
- ZIP code: 30456
- Area code: 478
- FIPS code: 13-68740
- GNIS feature ID: 0322525
- Website: https://sardisga.com/

Sardis is a city in Burke County, Georgia, United States. The population is 995 in 2020. It is part of the Augusta, Georgia metropolitan area in the Central Savannah River Area (CSRA).

== History ==
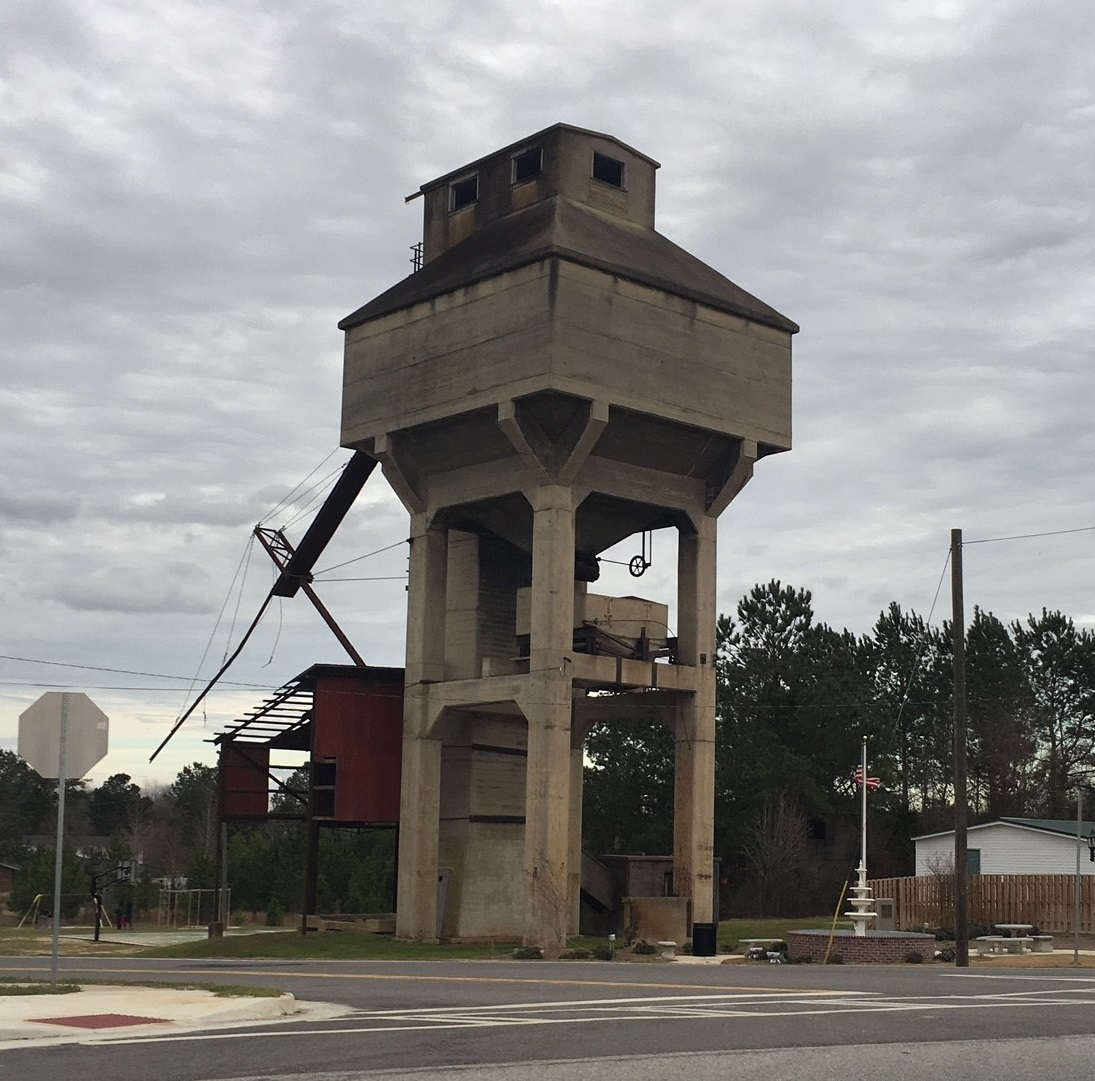
Coal Chute in Sardis, Georgia

Around the turn of the 20th century, a small crossroads community called Frog Wallow was developing in southeast Burke County. With the construction of the Savannah & Atlanta Railway, the tiny town lay on the new railroad connecting the two large hubs. In 1912, the town was incorporated as Sardis by the Georgia Legislature, named after the Baptist church that had flourished in the town over the past decades. The church's name, in turn, is a transfer from Sardis, an ancient city in present-day Turkey.

Sardis saw several decades of growth including a booming lumber industry. Then, in 1962, the owner of the railroad (Central of Georgia) abandoned the section of tracks between Waynesboro and Sylvania, which negatively affected the local economy. The tracks were subsequently removed in 1964. Sardis still retains its old train station and coal tower.

== Geography ==
Sardis is located in southeastern Burke County at 32°58′28″N 81°45′31″W (32.974510, -81.758504). It is 17 miles (27 km) southeast of Waynesboro, the Burke County seat.

According to the United States Census Bureau, the city has a total area of 1.5 square miles (4.0 km^{2}), of which 0.015 square miles (0.04 km^{2}), or 0.95%, is water.

== Demographics ==
Historical population
Census	Pop.	Note	%±
1930	580		—
1940	667		15.0%
1950	695		4.2%
1960	829		19.3%
1970	643		−22.4%
1980	1,180		83.5%
1990	1,116		−5.4%
2000	1,171		4.9%
2010	999		−14.7%
2020	995		−0.4%
U.S. Decennial Census; 1850-1870 1870-1880; 1890-1910 1920-1930; 1940 1950 1960; 1970 1980 1990; 2000 2010

=== Racial and ethnic composition ===
Sardis city, Georgia – Racial and ethnic composition Note: the US Census treats Hispanic/Latino as an ethnic category. This table excludes Latinos from the racial categories and assigns them to a separate category. Hispanics/Latinos may be of any race.
Race / Ethnicity (NH = Non-Hispanic)	Pop 2000	Pop 2010	Pop 2020	% 2000	% 2010	% 2020
White alone (NH)	517	435	469	44.15%	43.54%	47.14%
Black or African American alone (NH)	646	545	436	55.17%	54.55%	43.82%
Native American or Alaska Native alone (NH)	0	3	3	0.00%	0.30%	0.30%
Asian alone (NH)	0	0	1	0.00%	0.00%	0.10%
Native Hawaiian or Pacific Islander alone (NH)	0	0	0	0.00%	0.00%	0.00%
Other race alone (NH)	1	0	5	0.09%	0.00%	0.50%
Mixed race or Multiracial (NH)	2	9	69	0.17%	0.90%	6.93%
Hispanic or Latino (any race)	5	7	12	0.43%	0.70%	1.21%
Total	1,171	999	995	100.00%	100.00%	100.00%

=== 2020 census ===
As of the 2020 United States census, there were 995 people, 328 households, and 198 families residing in the city.

== See also ==
- Central Savannah River Area
