= Burke County Courthouse (Georgia) =

- U.S. National Register of Historic Places
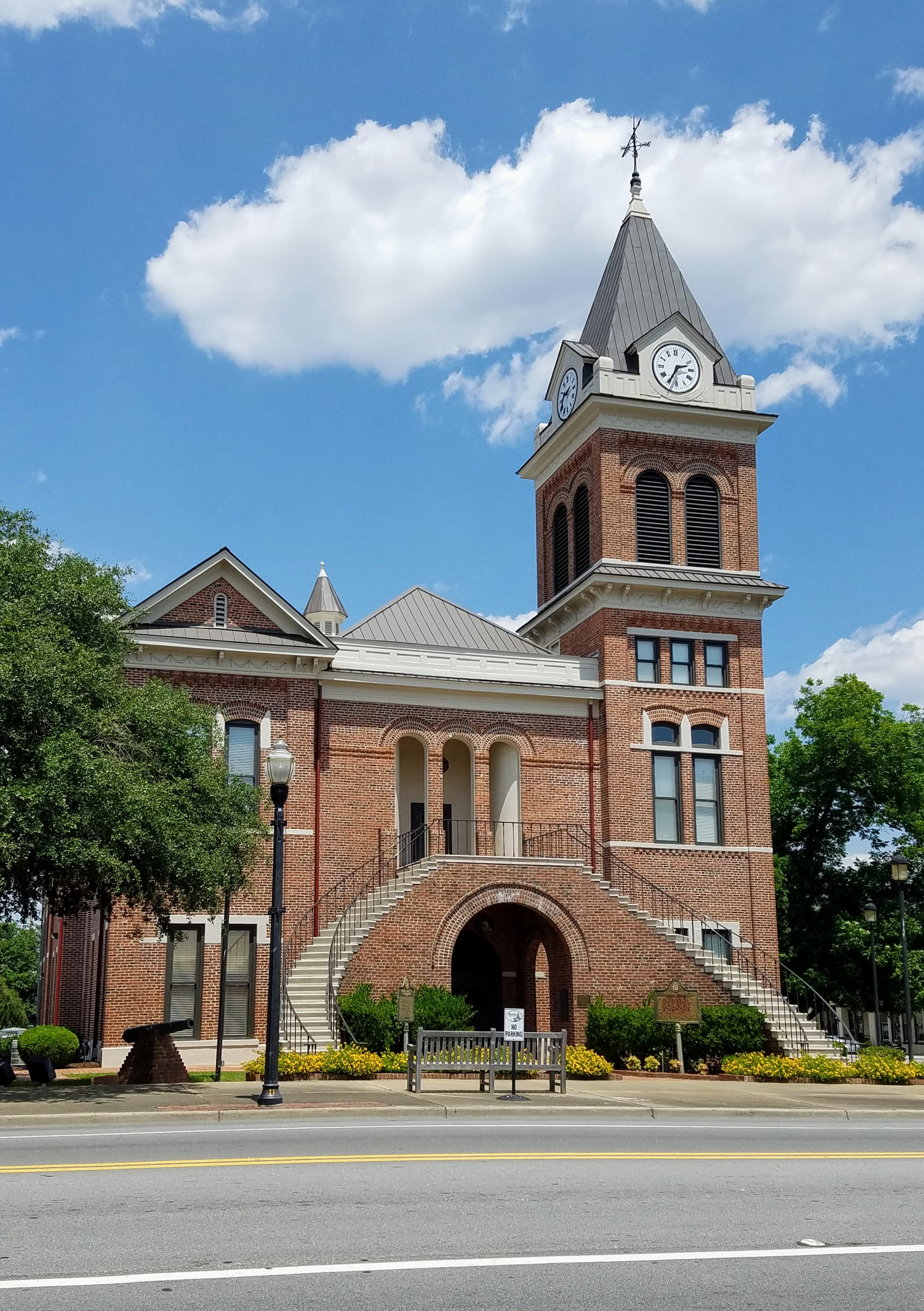
- June 2019

- Location within Georgia Location within the United States
- Location: Courthouse Sq., Waynesboro, Georgia
- Coordinates: 33°5′26″N 82°0′57″W
- Built: 1856
- Architect: L.F. Goodrich Et al.
- Architectural style: Carpenter Romanesque architecture
- MPS: Georgia County Courthouses TR
- NRHP reference No.: 80000980
- Added to NRHP: September 18, 1980

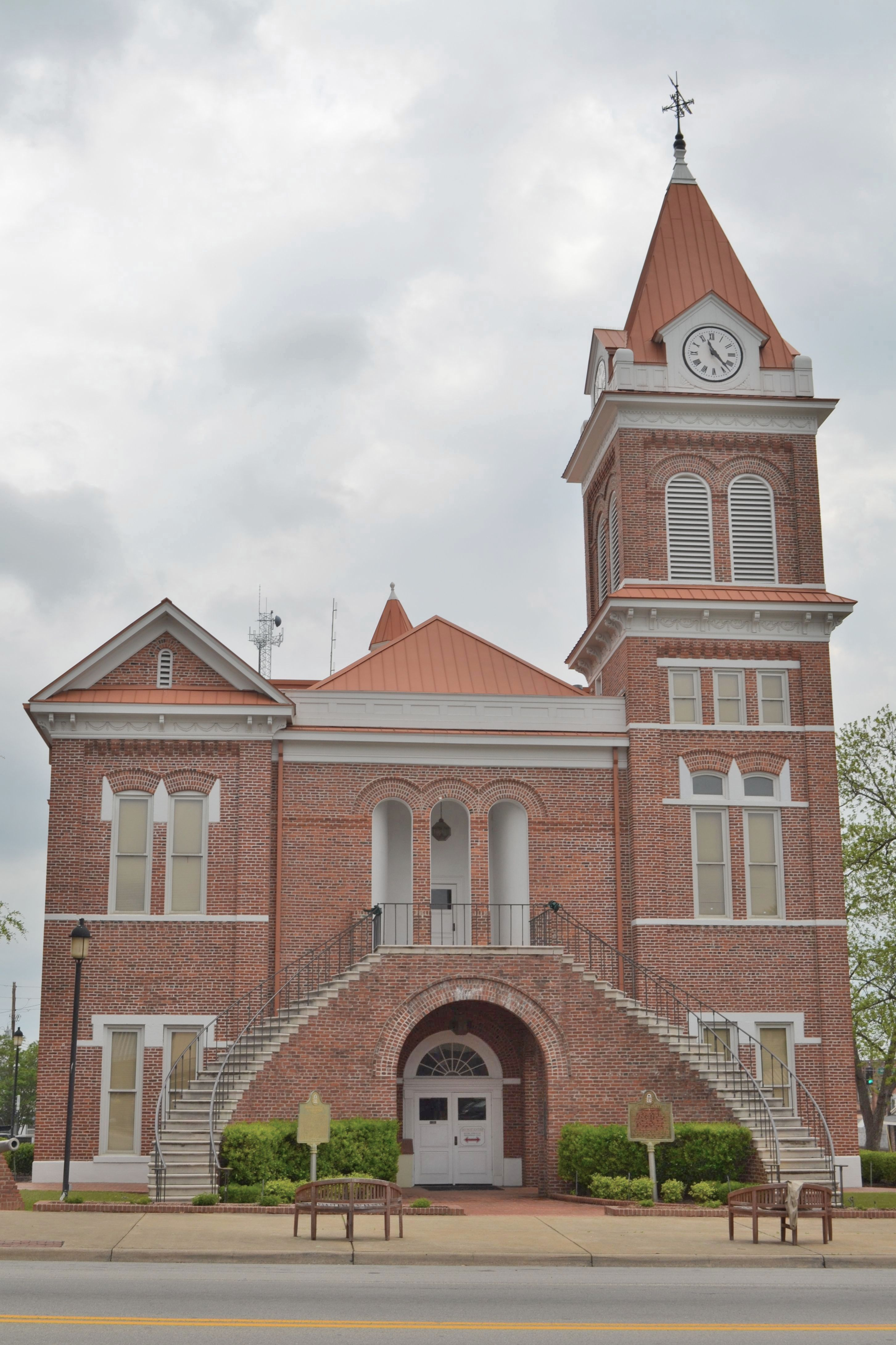
April 2011

Burke County Courthouse in Waynesboro, Georgia is a "carpenter Romanesque" (perhaps a vernacular Romanesque Revival) building completed in 1857. It is one of just four courthouses in Georgia that were built in the 1850s and still serve as courthouses. It was listed on the National Register of Historic Places in 1980. L.F. Goodrich is credited as the building's architect (likely for renovations or redesign work) and he also designed the Jenkins County Courthouse in Millen, Georgia.

It is a two-story structure built of red brick that is covered with a gritty cement-like mixture "scored to look like very perfect brick"; this treatment does not appear on any other Georgia courthouse but does appear on the Hay House in Macon, Georgia. It has a clock tower that rises in five stages to a pyramidal roof with pedimented clocks. The building also has two winding staircases at the front of the building. A two-story annex was built in 1940 and joined by an open bridge on two levels at the rear of the building.
