= Girard, Georgia =

- Town
- Location in Burke County and the state of Georgia
- Coordinates: 33°2′28″N 81°42′40″W
- Country: United States
- State: Georgia
- County: Burke

Area
  - Total: 3.20 sq mi (8.29 km^{2})
  - Land: 3.16 sq mi (8.19 km^{2})
  - Water: 0.039 sq mi (0.10 km^{2})
- Elevation: 240 ft (73 m)

Population (2020)
  - Total: 184
  - Density: 58.2/sq mi (22.47/km^{2})
- Time zone: UTC-5 (Eastern (EST))
  - Summer (DST): UTC-4 (EDT)
- ZIP code: 30426
- Area code: 478
- FIPS code: 13-32916
- GNIS feature ID: 0356019
- Website: georgia.gov/cities-counties/girard

Girard is a town in Burke County, Georgia, United States. The population was 184 in 2020. It is part of the Augusta, Georgia metropolitan area.

== History ==
Girard was incorporated in 1902.

== Geography ==
Girard is located at 33°2′28″N 81°42′40″W (33.040994, -81.711108).

According to the United States Census Bureau, the town has a total area of 3.2 square miles (8.3 km^{2}), of which 3.2 square miles (8.2 km^{2}) is land and 0.04 square miles (0.1 km^{2}), or 1.20%, is water.

Girard is located near the South Carolina state line on State Highway 23.

== Demographics ==
Historical population
Census	Pop.	Note	%±
1910	227		—
1920	300		32.2%
1930	321		7.0%
1940	300		−6.5%
1950	244		−18.7%
1960	248		1.6%
1970	241		−2.8%
1980	225		−6.6%
1990	195		−13.3%
2000	227		16.4%
2010	156		−31.3%
2020	184		17.9%
U.S. Decennial Census; 1850-1870 1880; 1890-1910 1920-1930; 1930-1940 1940-1950; 1960-1980 1980-2000

=== Racial and ethnic composition ===
Girard town, Georgia – Racial and ethnic composition Note: the US Census treats Hispanic/Latino as an ethnic category. This table excludes Latinos from the racial categories and assigns them to a separate category. Hispanics/Latinos may be of any race.
Race / Ethnicity (NH = Non-Hispanic)	Pop 2000	Pop 2010	Pop 2020	% 2000	% 2010	% 2020
White alone (NH)	129	106	118	56.83%	67.95%	64.13%
Black or African American alone (NH)	94	49	52	41.41%	31.41%	28.26%
Native American or Alaska Native alone (NH)	0	0	0	0.00%	0.00%	0.00%
Asian alone (NH)	0	0	1	0.00%	0.00%	0.54%
Native Hawaiian or Pacific Islander alone (NH)	0	0	0	0.00%	0.00%	0.00%
Other race alone (NH)	0	0	2	0.00%	0.00%	1.09%
Mixed race or Multiracial (NH)	0	0	9	0.00%	0.00%	4.89%
Hispanic or Latino (any race)	4	1	2	1.76%	0.64%	1.09%
Total	227	156	184	100.00%	100.00%	100.00%

=== 2020 census ===
At the 2010 census, there were 156 people living in the town. In 2020, its population grew to 184.

== See also ==
- Central Savannah River Area
