= Burke County, Georgia =

County in Georgia, United States

- County
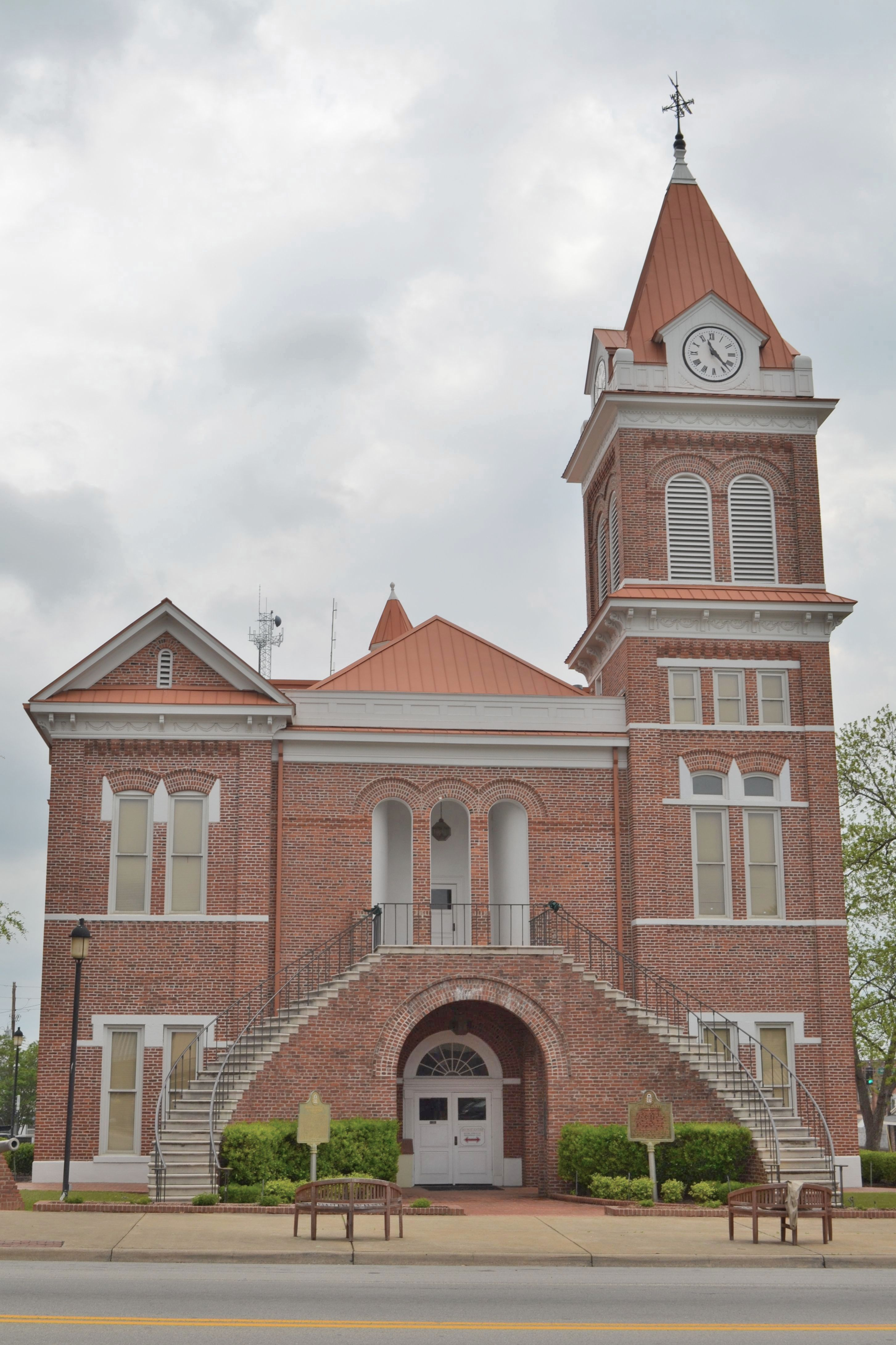
- Burke County Courthouse in Waynesboro

- Location within the U.S. state of Georgia
- Coordinates: 33°04′N 82°00′W
- Country: United States
- State: Georgia
- Founded: 1777; 249 years ago
- Named for: Edmund Burke
- Seat: Waynesboro
- Largest city: Waynesboro

Area
  - Total: 835 sq mi (2,160 km^{2})
  - Land: 827 sq mi (2,140 km^{2})
  - Water: 8.0 sq mi (21 km^{2}) 1.0%

Population (2020)
  - Total: 24,596
  - Estimate (2025): 24,408 ▼
  - Density: 27/sq mi (10/km^{2})
- Time zone: UTC−5 (Eastern)
  - Summer (DST): UTC−4 (EDT)
- Congressional district: 12th
- Website: www.burkecounty-ga.gov

Burke County is a county located along the eastern border of the U.S. state of Georgia in the Piedmont. As of the 2020 census, the population was 24,596. The county seat is Waynesboro. Burke County is part of the Augusta-Richmond County, GA-SC metropolitan statistical area.

== History ==
Burke County is an original county of Georgia, created February 5, 1777, and named for English political writer, Edmund Burke, a Member of Parliament in the Whig Party who favored conciliation with the colonies. In 1779, Col. John Twiggs and brothers Col. William Few and Benjamin Few, along with 250 men, defeated British in the Battle of Burke Jail.

Burke County is located within the CSRA (the Central Savannah River Area). During the antebellum period, it was developed by slave labor for large cotton plantations. The county was majority African American in population in this period, as slaveholders wanted high numbers of slaves for laborers to cultivate and process cotton.

The military tradition continued during the American Civil War, when Burke County provided volunteers for numerous units: the 2nd Regiment Georgia Infantry Company D (Burke Sharpshooters), 3rd Regiment Georgia Infantry Company A (Burke Guards), 32nd Regiment Georgia Infantry Company C (Williams Volunteers), 32nd Regiment Georgia Infantry Company K (Alexander Greys), 48th Regiment Georgia Infantry Company D (Burke Volunteers), Cobb's Legion Infantry company E (Poythress Volunteers), and the Cobb's Legion Cavalry Company F (Grubb's Hussars).

Agriculture continued as the basis of the economy for decades after the American Civil War, when most freedmen worked as sharecroppers or tenant farmers. Cotton was the major commodity crop. In the early 20th century, mechanization of agriculture caused many African-American farm workers to lose their jobs.

As can be seen from the census tables below, the county lost population from 1900 to 1910, and from 1920 to 1970. Part of the decline was related to the Great Migration, as millions of African Americans left the rural South and Jim Crow oppression for jobs and opportunities in industrial cities of the Midwest and the North. From World War II on, primary migration destinations were West Coast cities because of the buildup of the defense industry. In addition, whites left rural areas for industrial jobs in cities such as Atlanta.

== Geography ==
According to the U.S. Census Bureau, the county has a total area of 835 square miles (2,160 km^{2}), of which 827 square miles (2,140 km^{2}) is land and 8.0 square miles (21 km^{2}) (1.0%) is water. It is the second-largest county by area in Georgia.

The southern half of Burke County, defined by a line running along State Route 80 to Waynesboro, then southeast to east of Perkins, is located in the Upper Ogeechee River sub-basin of the Ogeechee River basin. North of Waynesboro, and bordered on the north by a line running from Keysville southeast to Girard, the territory is part of the Brier Creek sub-basin of the Savannah River basin. The most northern sliver of Burke County is located in the Middle Savannah River sub-basin of the same Savannah River basin.

=== Major highways ===
- US 25 / SR 121 / SR 555 / SR 565 – SR 565 and SR 665 are the unsigned designations for the Savannah River Parkway
  - US 25 Byp. / SR 121 Byp. (Burke Veterans Parkway)
- SR 17
- SR 23
- SR 24
- SR 56
  - SR 56 Spur
- SR 78
- SR 80
- SR 88
- SR 305

=== Adjacent counties ===
- Richmond County (north)
- Aiken County, South Carolina (northeast)
- Barnwell County, South Carolina (east-northeast)
- Allendale County, South Carolina (east)
- Screven County (southeast)
- Jenkins County (south)
- Emanuel County (southwest)
- Jefferson County (west)

== Communities ==
=== Cities ===
- Midville
- Sardis
- Vidette
- Waynesboro (county seat)

=== Towns ===
- Girard
- Keysville

=== Census-designated place ===
- Gough

=== Unincorporated community ===
- Drone

== Demographics ==
Historical population
Census	Pop.	Note	%±
1790	9,467		—
1800	9,504		0.4%
1810	10,858		14.2%
1820	11,577		6.6%
1830	11,833		2.2%
1840	13,176		11.3%
1850	16,100		22.2%
1860	17,165		6.6%
1870	17,679		3.0%
1880	27,128		53.4%
1890	28,501		5.1%
1900	30,165		5.8%
1910	27,268		−9.6%
1920	30,836		13.1%
1930	29,224		−5.2%
1940	26,520		−9.3%
1950	23,458		−11.5%
1960	20,596		−12.2%
1970	18,255		−11.4%
1980	19,349		6.0%
1990	20,579		6.4%
2000	22,243		8.1%
2010	23,316		4.8%
2020	24,596		5.5%
2025 (est.)	24,408	▼	−0.8%
U.S. Decennial Census; 1790-1880 1890-1910; 1920-1930 1930-1940; 1940-1950 1960-1980; 1980-2000

=== Racial and ethnic composition ===
Burke County, Georgia – Racial and ethnic composition Note: the US Census treats Hispanic/Latino as an ethnic category. This table excludes Latinos from the racial categories and assigns them to a separate category. Hispanics/Latinos may be of any race.
Race / Ethnicity (NH = Non-Hispanic)	Pop 1980	Pop 1990	Pop 2000	Pop 2010	Pop 2020	% 1980	% 1990	% 2000	% 2010	% 2020
White alone (NH)	8,883	9,719	10,336	10,844	11,941	45.91%	47.23%	46.47%	46.51%	48.55%
Black or African American alone (NH)	10,171	10,750	11,285	11,469	10,957	52.57%	52.24%	50.74%	49.19%	44.55%
Native American or Alaska Native alone (NH)	4	13	49	47	45	0.02%	0.06%	0.22%	0.20%	0.18%
Asian alone (NH)	22	26	51	68	97	0.11%	0.13%	0.23%	0.29%	0.39%
Native Hawaiian or Pacific Islander alone (NH)	x	x	3	20	10	x	x	0.01%	0.09%	0.04%
Other race alone (NH)	0	4	12	11	66	0.00%	0.02%	0.05%	0.05%	0.27%
Mixed race or Multiracial (NH)	x	x	191	240	703	x	x	0.86%	1.03%	2.86%
Hispanic or Latino (any race)	269	67	316	617	777	1.39%	0.33%	1.42%	2.65%	3.16%
Total	19,349	20,579	22,243	23,316	24,596	100.00%	100.00%	100.00%	100.00%	100.00%

=== 2020 census ===
As of the 2020 census, the county had a population of 24,596. The median age was 41.6 years. 23.7% of residents were under the age of 18 and 17.9% of residents were 65 years of age or older. For every 100 females there were 92.6 males, and for every 100 females age 18 and over there were 90.6 males age 18 and over. 24.8% of residents lived in urban areas, while 75.2% lived in rural areas.

The racial makeup of the county was 49.5% White, 44.8% Black or African American, 0.2% American Indian and Alaska Native, 0.4% Asian, 0.1% Native Hawaiian and Pacific Islander, 1.3% from some other race, and 3.7% from two or more races. Hispanic or Latino residents of any race comprised 3.2% of the population.

There were 9,905 households in the county, of which 29.1% had children under the age of 18 living with them and 35.0% had a female householder with no spouse or partner present. About 31.9% of all households were made up of individuals and 13.3% had someone living alone who was 65 years of age or older.

There were 11,138 housing units, of which 11.1% were vacant. Among occupied housing units, 65.8% were owner-occupied and 34.2% were renter-occupied. The homeowner vacancy rate was 0.8% and the rental vacancy rate was 8.9%.

=== 2010 census ===
In 2010, there were 23,316 people, 8,533 households, and 6,110 families living in the county. The population density was 28.2 inhabitants per square mile (10.9/km^{2}). There were 9,865 housing units at an average density of 11.9 per square mile (4.6/km^{2}).

In 2010, the racial makeup of the county was 49.5% Black or African American, 47.5% White, 0.3% Asian, 0.2% Native American, 0.1% Pacific Islander, 1.1% from some other race, and 1.3% from two or more races. 2.6% were Hispanic or Latino (of any race).

=== 2010 American Community Survey ===
In terms of ancestry as of 2010, 49.5% had some African ancestry, 11.0% identified as American, 9.3% were Irish, 5.5% were English, and 5.1% were German.

In 2010, the median income for a household in the county was $33,155 and the median income for a family was $41,659. Males had a median income of $37,061 versus $24,952 for females. The per capita income for the county was $15,934. About 20.0% of families and 25.7% of the population were below the poverty line, including 38.0% of those under age 18 and 16.2% of those age 65 or over.

=== 2000 census ===
At the 2000 census, there were 22,243 people, 7,934 households, and 5,799 families living in the county. The racial makeup of the county in 2000 was 51.0% Black or African American, 46.9% White, 0.2% Native American, 0.3% Asian, 0.01% Pacific Islander, 0.6% from other races, and 1.0% from two or more races. 1.4% of the population were Hispanic or Latino of any race.

In 2000, the median income for a household in the county was $27,877, and the median income for a family was $31,660. Males had a median income of $29,992 and females had an income of $19,008. The per capita income for the county was $13,136. About 23.80% of families and 28.70% of the population were below the poverty line, including 39.00% of those under age 18 and 29.80% of those age 65 or over.

== Education ==
It is within the Burke County School District. The district has one high school, one middle school, one complete elementary school, one upper elementary school, one primary school, and one alternative school.

- SGA Elementary School (Pre k-5)
- Blakeney Elementary School (3–5)
- Waynesboro Primary School (pre K-2)
- Burke County Middle School (6–8)
- Burke County High School (9–12)
- Burke County Alternative School (6–12)

Private Schools

- Faith Christian Academy (pre K-12)
- Edmund Burke Academy (Pre K-12)
- Waynesboro Mennonite School (1–12)

== Politics ==
Burke County was traditionally a swing county in federal politics, voting for the national popular vote winner in every presidential election from 1984 to 2016. However, the county has developed a slight Republican lean more recently. In 2020, it was the only county in the nation to flip to Donald Trump in a state that flipped to Joe Biden. Four years later, the county voted for Republican Donald Trump again in 2024, this time by a comfortable margin. It is now a Republican-leaning swing county.

For elections to the United States House of Representatives, Burke County is part of Georgia's 12th congressional district, currently represented by Rick Allen. For elections to the Georgia State Senate, Burke County is part of District 23. For elections to the Georgia House of Representatives, Burke County is part of District 126.

United States presidential election results for Burke County, Georgia
Year	Republican		Democratic		Third party(ies)	
Year	No.	%	No.	%	No.	%
1880	2,114	68.26%	983	31.74%	0	0.00%
1884	895	58.50%	558	36.47%	77	5.03%
1888	248	26.61%	684	73.39%	0	0.00%
1892	83	3.92%	1,322	62.39%	714	33.70%
1896	193	11.83%	1,414	86.70%	24	1.47%
1900	157	20.13%	620	79.49%	3	0.38%
1904	52	6.89%	657	87.02%	46	6.09%
1908	193	24.68%	519	66.37%	70	8.95%
1912	22	4.55%	440	90.91%	22	4.55%
1916	19	2.69%	673	95.33%	14	1.98%
1920	39	9.15%	387	90.85%	0	0.00%
1924	76	14.05%	449	82.99%	16	2.96%
1928	260	27.46%	687	72.54%	0	0.00%
1932	18	3.45%	498	95.40%	6	1.15%
1936	51	4.66%	1,040	95.06%	3	0.27%
1940	42	3.90%	1,029	95.54%	6	0.56%
1944	153	14.41%	909	85.59%	0	0.00%
1948	111	7.42%	357	23.86%	1,028	68.72%
1952	932	44.55%	1,160	55.45%	0	0.00%
1956	721	35.68%	1,300	64.32%	0	0.00%
1960	1,027	46.92%	1,162	53.08%	0	0.00%
1964	3,034	71.52%	1,208	28.48%	0	0.00%
1968	1,416	28.93%	1,676	34.25%	1,802	36.82%
1972	2,846	72.90%	1,058	27.10%	0	0.00%
1976	1,565	34.18%	3,014	65.82%	0	0.00%
1980	1,871	37.49%	3,047	61.05%	73	1.46%
1984	3,137	50.08%	3,127	49.92%	0	0.00%
1988	2,988	50.89%	2,861	48.72%	23	0.39%
1992	2,390	34.84%	3,647	53.17%	822	11.98%
1996	2,590	37.47%	3,915	56.63%	408	5.90%
2000	3,381	47.39%	3,720	52.14%	34	0.48%
2004	4,232	49.86%	4,213	49.64%	42	0.49%
2008	4,344	45.08%	5,233	54.30%	60	0.62%
2012	4,301	43.92%	5,405	55.19%	87	0.89%
2016	4,491	47.73%	4,731	50.28%	188	2.00%
2020	5,400	50.54%	5,208	48.74%	77	0.72%
2024	6,027	54.44%	4,994	45.11%	49	0.44%

United States Senate election results for Burke County, Georgia2
Year	Republican		Democratic		Third party(ies)	
Year	No.	%	No.	%	No.	%
2020	5,407	51.20%	4,989	47.24%	164	1.55%
2020	4,806	50.63%	4,686	49.37%	0	0.00%

United States Senate election results for Burke County, Georgia3
Year	Republican		Democratic		Third party(ies)	
Year	No.	%	No.	%	No.	%
2020	3,018	28.84%	3,158	30.18%	4,289	40.98%
2020	4,804	50.57%	4,695	49.43%	0	0.00%
2022	4,462	52.81%	3,885	45.98%	102	1.21%
2022	4,148	52.33%	3,778	47.67%	0	0.00%

Georgia Gubernatorial election results for Burke County
Year	Republican		Democratic		Third party(ies)	
Year	No.	%	No.	%	No.	%
2022	4,685	55.33%	3,720	43.94%	62	0.73%

== See also ==
- Central Savannah River Area
- National Register of Historic Places listings in Burke County, Georgia
- List of counties in Georgia
