= Keysville, Georgia =

- Town
- Location in Burke County and the state of Georgia
- Coordinates: 33°14′7″N 82°13′54″W
- Country: United States
- State: Georgia
- Counties: Burke, Jefferson

Area
  - Total: 1.08 sq mi (2.79 km^{2})
  - Land: 1.05 sq mi (2.73 km^{2})
  - Water: 0.023 sq mi (0.06 km^{2})
- Elevation: 260 ft (80 m)

Population (2020)
  - Total: 300
  - Density: 284.7/sq mi (109.92/km^{2})
- Time zone: UTC-5 (Eastern (EST))
  - Summer (DST): UTC-4 (EDT)
- ZIP codes: 30811, 30816
- Area code: 706
- FIPS code: 13-43360
- GNIS feature ID: 0316404
- Website: keysvillega.org

Keysville is a town in Burke and Jefferson counties in the U.S. state of Georgia. As of the 2020 census, the city's population was 300.

== History ==
The Georgia General Assembly incorporated Keysville as a town in 1890. In 1933, the government was dissolved although its charter was not revoked. In late 1990, the government was reconstituted.

== Geography ==
Keysville is located at 33°14′7″N 82°13′54″W (33.235293, −82.231687), 23 miles (37 km) southwest of downtown Augusta.

According to the United States Census Bureau, the city has a total area of 1.1 square miles (2.8 km^{2}), of which 0.023 square miles (0.06 km^{2}), or 2.08%, is water.

== Demographics ==
Historical population
Census	Pop.	Note	%±
1930	378		—
1940	363		−4.0%
1950	304		−16.3%
1990	350		—
2000	180		−48.6%
2010	332		84.4%
2020	300		−9.6%
U.S. Decennial Census; 1850-1870 1880; 1890-1910 1920-1930; 1930-1940 1940-1950; 1960-1980 1980-2000

Keysville first appeared in the 1930 U.S. Census. It did not appear in the 1960 U.S. census, the 1970 U.S. census, or the 1980 United States census, It reappeared in the 1990 U.S. census.

=== Racial and ethnic composition ===
Keysville, Georgia – Racial and ethnic composition Note: the US Census treats Hispanic/Latino as an ethnic category. This table excludes Latinos from the racial categories and assigns them to a separate category. Hispanics/Latinos may be of any race.
Race / Ethnicity (NH = Non-Hispanic)	Pop 2000	Pop 2010	Pop 2020	% 2000	% 2010	% 2020
White alone (NH)	60	125	91	33.33%	37.65%	30.33%
Black or African American alone (NH)	112	183	185	62.22%	55.12%	61.67%
Native American or Alaska Native alone (NH)	0	0	0	0.00%	0.00%	0.00%
Asian alone (NH)	0	6	4	0.00%	1.81%	1.33%
Native Hawaiian or Pacific Islander alone (NH)	0	0	0	0.00%	0.00%	0.00%
Other race alone (NH)	1	0	0	0.56%	0.00%	0.00%
Mixed race or Multiracial (NH)	4	6	11	2.22%	1.81%	3.67%
Hispanic or Latino (any race)	3	12	9	1.67%	3.61%	3.00%
Total	180	332	300	100.00%	100.00%	100.00%

In 2020, its population was 300.

== See also ==
- Central Savannah River Area
