= Waynesboro, Georgia =

- City
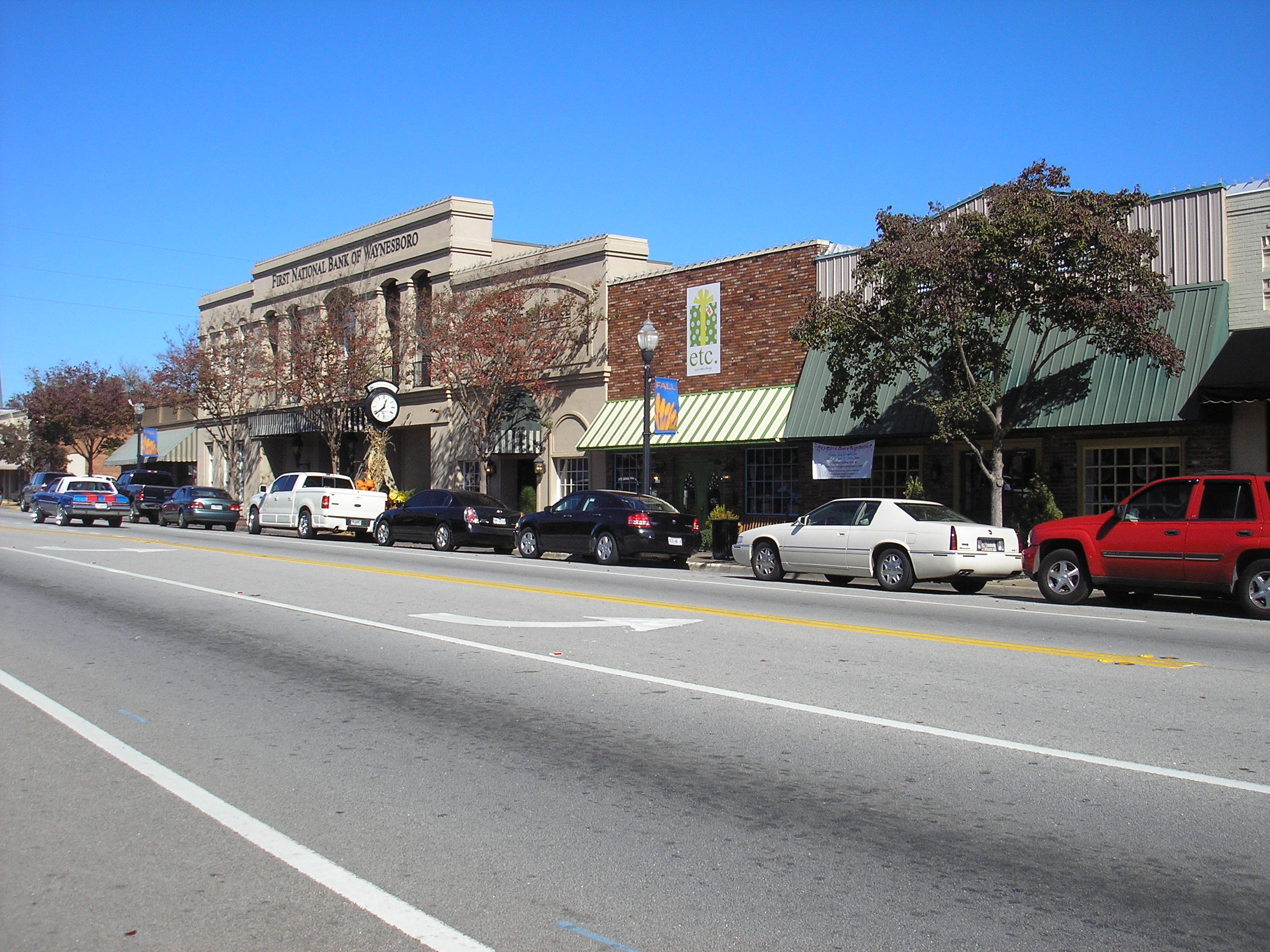
- Downtown Waynesboro, within the historic district

- Seal
- Nickname: "The Bird Dog Capital of the World"
- Location in Burke County and the state of Georgia
- Coordinates: 33°5′26″N 82°0′55″W
- Country: United States
- State: Georgia
- County: Burke

Area
  - Total: 5.53 sq mi (14.31 km^{2})
  - Land: 5.47 sq mi (14.17 km^{2})
  - Water: 0.054 sq mi (0.14 km^{2})
- Elevation: 300 ft (90 m)

Population (2020)
  - Total: 5,799
  - Density: 1,000/sq mi (386.2/km^{2})
- Time zone: UTC-5 (Eastern (EST))
  - Summer (DST): UTC-4 (EDT)
- ZIP code: 30830
- Area code: 706
- FIPS code: 13-80984
- GNIS feature ID: 0347180
- Website: www.waynesboroga.com

Waynesboro (/ˈweɪnzbʌroʊ/) is a city and the county seat of Burke County, Georgia, United States. The population was 5,472 at the 2024 census. It is part of the Augusta, Georgia metropolitan area.

Waynesboro is 37 minutes south of downtown Augusta by car via US 25. Waynesboro is known as "The Bird Dog Capital of the World". The Waynesboro Commercial Historic District is listed on the National Register of Historic Places.

Waynesboro is located in Burke County, one of the eight original counties of Georgia. The city was named after General Anthony Wayne, whose daring efforts during the Revolutionary War earned him the nickname "Mad Anthony Wayne".

== History ==
In 1779, during the Revolutionary War, Burke Jail was the scene of a battle between the British (led by Thomas Brown and Daniel McGirt) and the victorious Americans (John Twiggs and William Few).

Although European Americans lived in the area before the Revolutionary War, the town was not laid out until 1783. The city was officially incorporated in 1883 as Waynesborough. The name was changed to Waynesboro sometime after. It developed as the trading and government center of the county, and is the site of the county courthouse and jail.

President George Washington spent the night of May 17, 1791, in Waynesboro, having gone six miles "out of our way" to visit. A stone monument on Liberty Street marks the historical site; it stands in front of a business.

On December 4, 1864, the Civil War Battle of Waynesboro was fought just south of the town. Forces under Union General Judson Kilpatrick prevented troops led by Confederate General Joseph Wheeler from interfering with Union General William T. Sherman's campaign to destroy a wide swathe of the South on his march to Savannah, Georgia, and the Atlantic Ocean.

President William Taft visited Waynesboro in 1910.

== Geography ==
Waynesboro is located in the center of Burke County at 33°5′26″N 82°0′55″W (33.090482, -82.015404). U.S. Route 25 passes through the center as Liberty Street. To the north it is 34 miles (55 km) to downtown Augusta, and to the south it is 49 miles (79 km) to Statesboro.

According to the United States Census Bureau, Waynesboro has a total area of 5.5 square miles (14.2 km^{2}), of which 5.4 square miles (14.0 km^{2}) is land and 0.039 square miles (0.1 km^{2}), or 0.96%, is water. The city's elevation is 295 feet (90 m) above sea level. Pine, oak, dogwood, and other trees found in the South are in Waynesboro.

=== Climate ===
Waynesboro has a humid subtropical climate (Köppen Cfa) with long, hot summers and short, mild winters.

Climate data for Waynesboro (1991–2020 normals, extremes 1891–1894, 1900–1921, 1940–present)
Month	Jan	Feb	Mar	Apr	May	Jun	Jul	Aug	Sep	Oct	Nov	Dec	Year
Record high °F (°C)	84 (29)	86 (30)	95 (35)	98 (37)	104 (40)	109 (43)	108 (42)	107 (42)	104 (40)	101 (38)	87 (31)	83 (28)	109 (43)
Mean maximum °F (°C)	74.7 (23.7)	77.7 (25.4)	83.8 (28.8)	87.6 (30.9)	93.1 (33.9)	97.0 (36.1)	98.6 (37.0)	97.7 (36.5)	93.3 (34.1)	88.1 (31.2)	81.6 (27.6)	76.0 (24.4)	99.5 (37.5)
Mean daily maximum °F (°C)	57.9 (14.4)	62.1 (16.7)	69.3 (20.7)	76.6 (24.8)	83.6 (28.7)	89.2 (31.8)	91.9 (33.3)	90.4 (32.4)	85.7 (29.8)	77.2 (25.1)	67.5 (19.7)	60.1 (15.6)	76.0 (24.4)
Daily mean °F (°C)	46.0 (7.8)	49.4 (9.7)	56.0 (13.3)	63.2 (17.3)	71.2 (21.8)	78.1 (25.6)	81.2 (27.3)	79.9 (26.6)	74.8 (23.8)	64.5 (18.1)	54.2 (12.3)	48.0 (8.9)	63.9 (17.7)
Mean daily minimum °F (°C)	34.0 (1.1)	36.8 (2.7)	42.8 (6.0)	49.8 (9.9)	58.9 (14.9)	66.9 (19.4)	70.5 (21.4)	69.4 (20.8)	63.9 (17.7)	51.9 (11.1)	40.8 (4.9)	35.9 (2.2)	51.8 (11.0)
Mean minimum °F (°C)	18.8 (−7.3)	22.7 (−5.2)	26.9 (−2.8)	35.2 (1.8)	45.0 (7.2)	57.8 (14.3)	63.3 (17.4)	61.6 (16.4)	51.8 (11.0)	36.3 (2.4)	27.1 (−2.7)	22.0 (−5.6)	16.7 (−8.5)
Record low °F (°C)	−1 (−18)	9 (−13)	17 (−8)	27 (−3)	34 (1)	44 (7)	54 (12)	52 (11)	34 (1)	23 (−5)	15 (−9)	5 (−15)	−1 (−18)
Average precipitation inches (mm)	3.99 (101)	4.25 (108)	4.56 (116)	3.51 (89)	2.84 (72)	5.13 (130)	5.03 (128)	4.62 (117)	3.66 (93)	3.49 (89)	2.80 (71)	4.31 (109)	48.19 (1,223)
Average precipitation days (≥ 0.01 in)	7.4	7.2	7.4	5.9	5.9	8.0	8.9	9.1	5.7	5.5	5.9	7.2	84.1
Source: NOAA

== Demographics ==
Historical population
Census	Pop.	Note	%±
1850	196		—
1880	1,008		—
1890	1,711		69.7%
1900	2,030		18.6%
1910	2,729		34.4%
1920	3,311		21.3%
1930	3,922		18.5%
1940	3,793		−3.3%
1950	4,461		17.6%
1960	5,359		20.1%
1970	5,530		3.2%
1980	5,760		4.2%
1990	5,701		−1.0%
2000	5,813		2.0%
2010	5,766		−0.8%
2020	5,799		0.6%
U.S. Decennial Census; 1850-1870 1870-1880; 1890-1910 1920-1930; 1940 1950 1960; 1970 1980 1990; 2000 2010

=== Racial and ethnic composition ===
Waynesboro city, Georgia – Racial and ethnic composition Note: the US Census treats Hispanic/Latino as an ethnic category. This table excludes Latinos from the racial categories and assigns them to a separate category. Hispanics/Latinos may be of any race.
Race / Ethnicity (NH = Non-Hispanic)	Pop 2000	Pop 2010	Pop 2020	% 2000	% 2010	% 2020
White alone (NH)	2,072	1,495	1,603	35.64%	25.93%	27.64%
Black or African American alone (NH)	3,609	4,062	3,861	62.08%	70.45%	66.58%
Native American or Alaska Native alone (NH)	6	2	9	0.10%	0.03%	0.16%
Asian alone (NH)	5	24	32	0.09%	0.42%	0.55%
Native Hawaiian or Pacific Islander alone (NH)	0	3	0	0.00%	0.05%	0.00%
Other race alone (NH)	0	5	15	0.00%	0.09%	0.26%
Mixed race or Multiracial (NH)	51	58	142	0.88%	1.01%	2.45%
Hispanic or Latino (any race)	70	117	137	1.20%	2.03%	2.36%
Total	5,813	5,766	5,799	100.00%	100.00%	100.00%

=== 2020 census ===
As of the 2020 census, Waynesboro had a population of 5,799. The median age was 35.2 years. 29.2% of residents were under the age of 18 and 16.2% were 65 years of age or older. For every 100 females there were 77.1 males, and for every 100 females age 18 and over there were 69.4 males age 18 and over.

99.8% of residents lived in urban areas, while 0.2% lived in rural areas.

There were 2,384 households in Waynesboro, of which 35.2% had children under the age of 18 living in them. Of all households, 23.7% were married-couple households, 18.2% were households with a male householder and no spouse or partner present, and 51.6% were households with a female householder and no spouse or partner present. About 35.4% of all households were made up of individuals, and 16.3% had someone living alone who was 65 years of age or older.

There were 2,612 housing units, of which 8.7% were vacant. The homeowner vacancy rate was 0.4% and the rental vacancy rate was 5.6%.

== Economy ==
=== Nuclear power plant ===
On February 2, 2010, President Obama was expected to announce a total of $8.3 billion in federal loan guarantees to build and operate a pair of nuclear reactors in Burke County by Southern Company, an Atlanta-based energy company. The U.S. Department of Energy (DOE) offered Southern Company's subsidiary, Georgia Power, a conditional commitment for loan guarantees for the construction of the nation's first nuclear power units in more than 30 years. The new units will be located at Plant Vogtle along the Savannah River 21 miles (34 km) east of Waynesboro, where the company already owns and operates two nuclear units. The conditional commitment is for loan guarantees that would apply to future borrowings related to the construction of Vogtle units 3 and 4.

== Arts and culture ==
The Burke County Museum traces the area's history, from plantation life to the establishment of agribusiness.

== Education ==
=== K-12 education ===
K-12 public education in Waynesboro is managed by Burke County Public Schools, which covers all of Burke County.

These two elementary schools are the district's elementary facilities in Waynesboro:

- Blakeney Elementary School (Grades 3–5)
- Waynesboro Primary School (Pre-Kindergarten through grade 2)

These are the district's secondary schools, relevant to all of Burke County:

- Burke County Middle School (6–8)
- Burke County High School (9–12)
- Burke County Alternative School (6–12)

There are three private schools which are in unincorporated areas outside of the Waynesboro city limits:

- Faith Christian Academy (pre K-12)
- Edmund Burke Academy (Pre K-12)
- Waynesboro Mennonite School (1–12)

=== Burke County Bears ===
Waynesboro is the home to the Burke County Bears high school sports teams. The Bears won the 2011 state football championship against the Trojans of Peach County. Back in the 1950s, the former Waynesboro High School team, the Purple Hurricanes, won the state championship, but the Bears had not won a state championship football game until 2011.

=== Higher education ===
- Augusta Technical College, Waynesboro campus

== Notable people ==
- Jonathan Broxton, Major League Baseball player
- Wycliffe Gordon, jazz trombonist
- Cornelius Washington, NFL player
- Robert Lee Scott, Jr., World War II fighter ace
- Beau Jack, born Sidney Walker, Boxing World Champion Boxer

== See also ==
- Central Savannah River Area
