= National Register of Historic Places listings in Jefferson County, Georgia =

This is a list of properties and districts in Jefferson County, Georgia that are listed on the National Register of Historic Places (NRHP).

This National Park Service list is complete through NPS recent listings posted March 21, 2025.

== Current listings ==
	Name on the Register	Image	Date listed	Location	City or town	Description
1	Bartow Historic District	Bartow Historic District	January 13, 2009 (#08001320)	Roughly centered along U.S. Hwy. 221, U.S. Hwy. 319 and the CSX rail line 32°52′45″N 82°28′27″W	Bartow	
2	Cunningham-Coleman House		September 7, 1984 (#84001119)	SE of Wadley, on Leaptrott Rd. 32°50′44″N 82°20′44″W	Wadley	Sand Hills cottage with Greek Revival details, from 1830
3	Jefferson County Courthouse	Jefferson County Courthouse	September 18, 1980 (#80001099)	Courthouse Sq. 32°59′53″N 82°24′31″W	Louisville	Built in 1904, it stands on the site of Georgia's first permanent capitol. Contributing property to Louisville Commercial Historic District
4	Louisville Commercial Historic District	Louisville Commercial Historic District	January 13, 1994 (#93001469)	Area surrounding Broad St. between Peachtree and Screven Sts., including parts of Walnut, Mulberry and Green Sts. 32°59′58″N 82°24′35″W	Louisville	Courthouse and 40 other buildings in city laid out in 1794 to serve as Georgia's capital
5	Old Market	Old Market	February 17, 1978 (#78000991)	U.S. 1 and GA 24; 33°00′00″N 82°24′33″W	Louisville	Contributing property to Louisville Commercial Historic District
