= WPEH =

WPEH may refer to:

- WPEH (AM), a radio station (1420 AM) licensed to Louisville, Georgia, United States
- WPEH-FM, a radio station (92.1 FM) licensed to Louisville, Georgia, United States
