= Ben Boyd =

Ben Boyd may refer to:

- Benjamin Boyd (1801–1851), Scottish-born Australian industrialist and politician
- Benjamin Boyd (mayor), intendent (mayor) of Charleston, South Carolina
- Ben Boyd (baseball) (1858–?), African-American baseball player
