= Willis F. Denny =

American architect

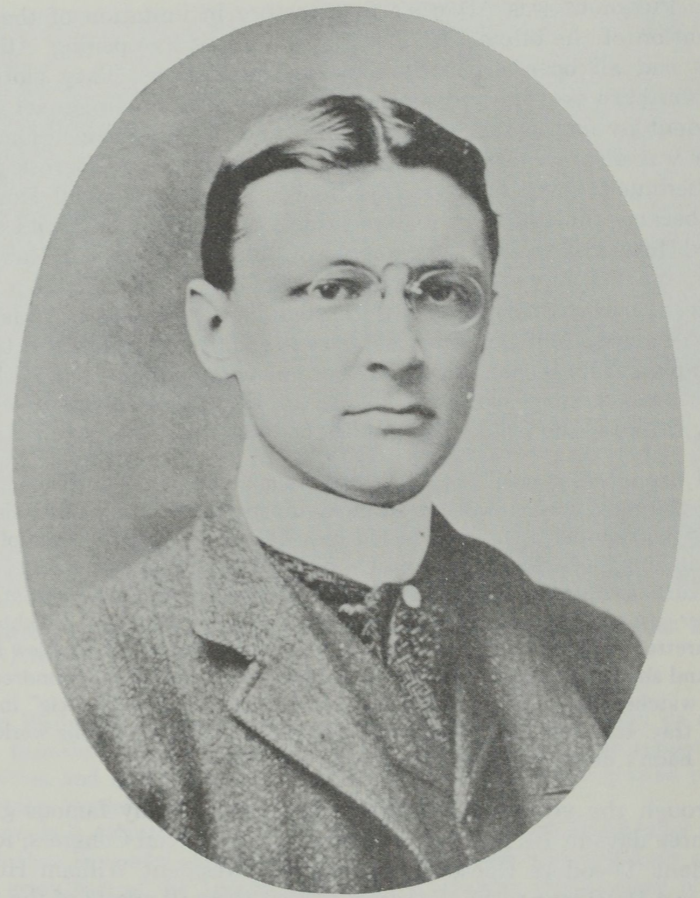
Willis F. Denny, c. 1903

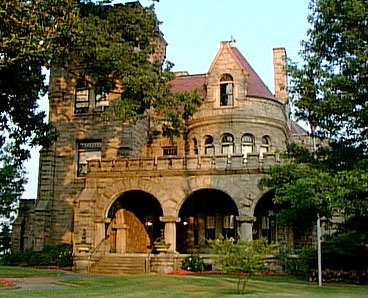
Rhodes Hall

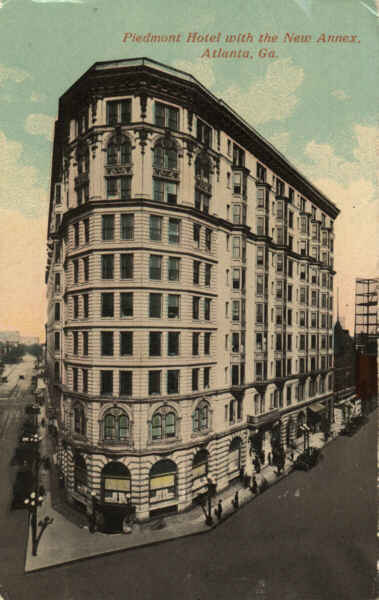
Piedmont Hotel 1903-1963

Willis F. Denny (1874–1905) was an architect active in Atlanta, Georgia around the turn of the twentieth century. He was the architect of Rhodes Hall (1903) and the Kriegshaber House (1900, now Wrecking Bar Brewpub), both listed on the National Register, as well as the demolished Piedmont Hotel (1903).

His father-in-law was Major Asbury Fletcher Moreland, who lived on what is now Moreland Avenue and after whom the avenue was named.

A number of his works are listed on the National Register of Historic Places.

Works include (with variations in attribution):

- Piedmont Hotel (1903), demolished.
- the Methodist church in Conyers, Georgia (1902), Late Gothic Revival, in red brick, a contributing building in the Conyers Residential Historic District,
- First Baptist Church of Augusta, Greene and 8th Sts., Augusta, Georgia (Denny, Willis Franklin), NRHP-listed
- Hartwell Methodist Episcopal Church, South, Howell St., Hartwell, Georgia (Denny, Willis F.), NRHP-listed
- One or more works in Inman Park-Moreland Historic District, roughly bounded by N. Highland, Seminole and Euclid, DeKalb, and Degress and Nashita Aves., Atlanta, Georgia (Denny, Willis F.), NRHP-listed
- Jefferson County Courthouse, Courthouse Sq., Louisville, Georgia (Denny, W.F.), NRHP-listed
- Victor H. Kriegshaber House, 292 Moreland Ave., NE, Atlanta, Georgia (Denny, Willis F.), NRHP-listed
- Louisville Commercial Historic District, area surrounding Broad St. between Peachtree and Screven Sts., including parts of Walnut, Mulberry and Green Sts., Louisville, Georgia (Denny, Willis F.), NRHP-listed
- Rhodes Memorial Hall, 1516 Peachtree St., Atlanta, Georgia (Denny, Willis F.), NRHP-listed
- St. Mark Methodist Church, 781 Peachtree St., Atlanta, Georgia (Denny, Willis F.), NRHP-listed

Denny built his own home at what was 30 Moreland Avenue (according to the old street numbering system) in Moreland Park, now part of Inman Park, immediately north of the site of the Asbury Fletcher Moreland estate and two lots north of the Victor H. Kriegshaber House. The home was razed in the 1940s, however two lion statues marked with the number "86" still stand at the current address of 326 Moreland Ave.
