= Oscar Jackson =

Oscar Jackson may refer to:

- Oscar Jackson (baseball) (fl. 1887–1906), African-American baseball outfielder and first baseman
- Oscar Lawrence Jackson (1840–1920), U.S. Representative from Pennsylvania and Union Army commander
- Oscar B. Jackson Jr. (born 1947), American civil servant from the state of Oklahoma
- Oscar Jackson, former producer of the New Zealand radio show The Edge Afternoons with Guy, Sharyn & Clint
