= Louisville Commercial Historic District =

- U.S. National Register of Historic Places
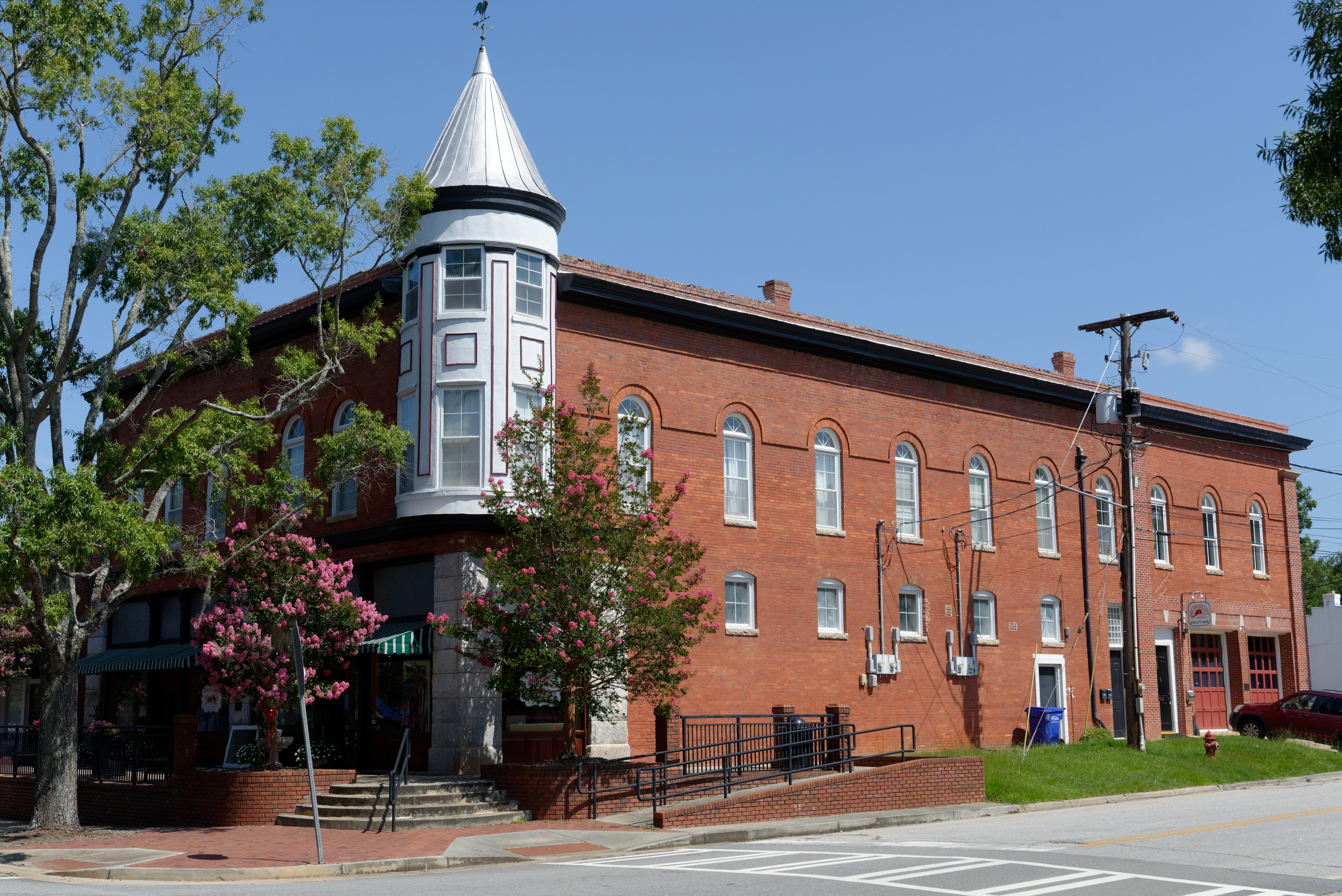
- Abbot and Stone Building, 2020

- Location within Georgia
- Location: Area surrounding Broad St. between Peachtree and Screven Sts., including parts of Walnut, Mulberry and Green Sts., Louisville, Georgia
- Coordinates: 32°59′58″N 82°24′35″W
- Area: 18 acres (7.3 ha)
- Built: 1794
- Architect: Willis F. Denny, Louis A. Simon, others
- Architectural style: Romanesque, Early Commercial, Beaux Arts
- NRHP reference No.: 93001469
- Added to NRHP: January 13, 1994

The Louisville Commercial Historic District, in Louisville, Georgia, is a historic district which was listed on the National Register of Historic Places in 1994.

It includes 41 contributing buildings and a contributing structure in an 18 acres (7.3 ha) area surrounding Broad St. between Peachtree and Screven Sts., including parts of Walnut, Mulberry and Green Streets.

It includes the Jefferson County Courthouse and the Old Market, which are separately listed on the National Register.

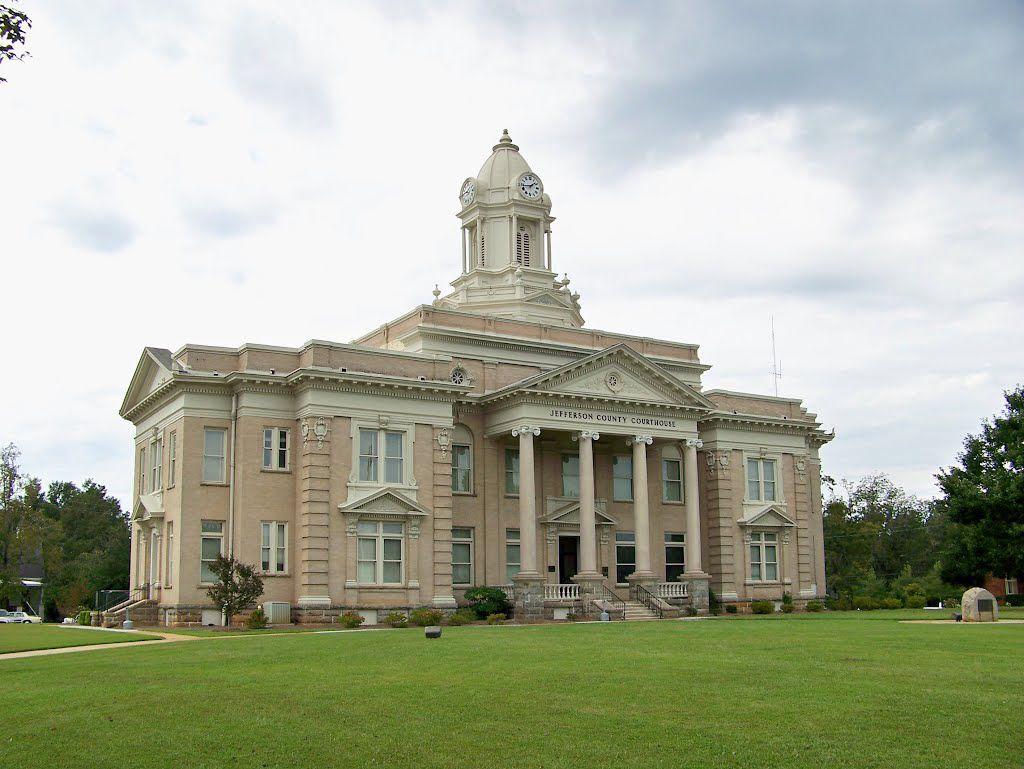
Jefferson County Courthouse - September 2013

The town was laid out in 1794. It was named Louisville pursuant to 1786 plans of the Georgia Legislature for a new state capital. Louisville served as capital of the state of Georgia for 11 years, from 1796 to 1806; the capital then moved to Milledgeville. Only one structure from that period is known to have survived. A statehouse building which was the capitol, was built; its site is now occupied by the Jefferson County Courthouse. Architect Willis F. Denny designed the Beaux Arts courthouse which was completed in 1904. Denny also designed two adjacent two-story brick commercial structures on the southwest side of Broad Street between Mulberry and Green Streets. These have Victorian-era commercial detailing (see photo #11).

The commercial area declined during the 1920s and 1930s from the economic effects of the boll weevil and the Great Depression. A New Deal program, the Federal Works Agency, however, built a new post office designed by Louis A. Simon. The post office gained, in 1941, a New Deal mural titled ""Plantation, Education, Transportation" painted by Hungary-born Abraham Harrison; by 1993 the mural had been removed to storage.

== See also ==
- Jefferson County Courthouse
- Old Market
