= Jefferson County High School (Georgia) =

Location
- 1157 Warrior Trail; Louisville, Georgia 30434; United States; 33.103621°N 82.410507°W

Information
- Motto: "JCHS is a fountain of knowledge - don't leave thirsty"
- School district: Jefferson County School District
- Principal: Carl Prescott
- Teaching staff: 44.10 FTE
- Grades: 9-12
- Enrollment: 632 (2023-2024)
- Student to teacher ratio: 14.33
- Color
- Athletics: GHSA
- Athletics conference: 3B AA
- Mascot: Warrior
- Team name: Warriors
- Accreditation: Southern Association of Colleges and Schools
- Publication: The BattleCry
- Yearbook: The Arrow
- Feeder schools: Jefferson County Middle School
- Telephone: (478) 625-9991
- Fax: (478) 625-8988
- Website: Jefferson County High School

Jefferson County High School (JCHS) is a public high school located in Louisville, Georgia, United States. The school is part of the Jefferson County School District, which serves Jefferson County.

== History ==
=== Establishment ===
In 1995 the two public high schools of Jefferson County, an administrative area including approximately 17,000 residents, were closed and consolidated into a single new entity, Jefferson County High School. At the time of the new school's construction in Louisville, more than half of the county's residents did not have a high school education, and 70 percent of its high school graduates did not seek a college education.

The Jefferson County School District named Molly Howard as principal of the new school at the time of its formation. She and the school's staff set about improving the educational performance of the student body, posting impressive gains in achievement in state-mandated mathematics tests during the first decade of the 21st century, which led to Howard being selected as the 2008 National High School Principal of the Year by the National Association of Secondary School Principals.

=== Demographics ===
Jefferson County High School has slightly more than 1,000 students, of whom 79% are of non-European American ethnicity. About four out of five Jefferson County High School students are from families with income levels low enough to qualify for price-subsidized lunches.

== Notable alumni ==
- Kydran Jenkins, college football defensive end and linebacker for the Purdue Boilermakers
