= Andrew Jackson (baseball) =

American baseball player

- Third baseman
- Born: September 28, 1865; Greenville, New Jersey, U.S.
- Died: May 15, 1900 (aged 34); New York City, New York, U.S.
- Batted: Unknown Threw: Unknown

debut
- 1887, for the New York Gorhams

Last appearance
- 1899, for the Cuban Giants

Teams
- New York Gorhams (1887–1889); Cuban Giants (1890, 1893–1894, 1896, 1899); Cuban X-Giants; York Monarchs (1890); New York Big Gorhams (1891)

Andrew J. "Ajax" Jackson (September 28, 1865 – May 15, 1900) was an American baseball third baseman in the late 19th century, who played for predecessor teams to the Negro leagues. He played for several teams from 1887 to 1899, spending the majority of his career with the Cuban Giants. He was the brother of fellow player Oscar Jackson.
