= Old Market (Louisville, Georgia) =

Historic building and former slave market in Georgia, United States

- U.S. National Register of Historic Places
- U.S. Historic district – Contributing property
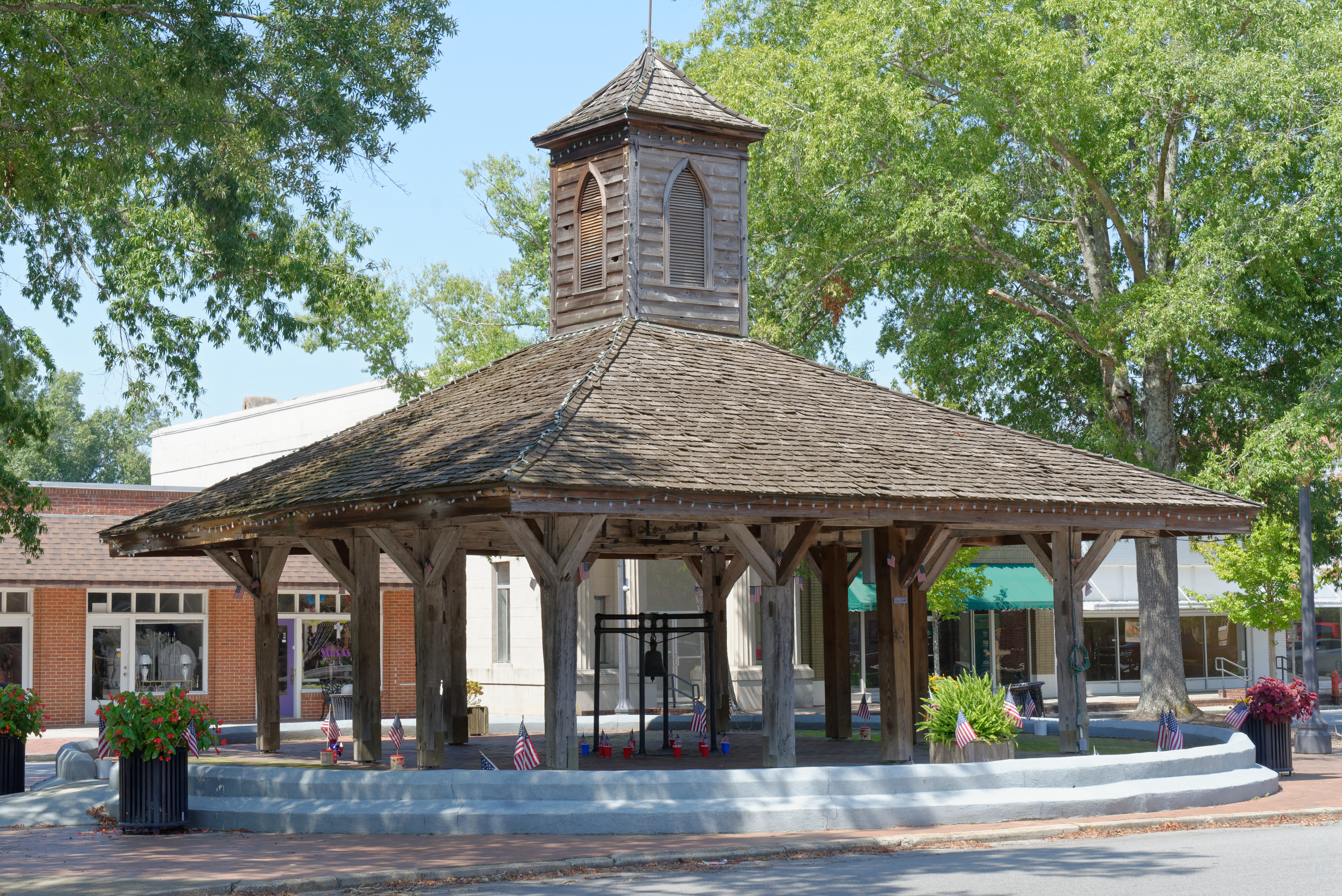
- The Market in August 2020

- Location within Georgia Location within the United States
- Location: U.S. 1 (Bus) (Broad Street) at Georgia State Route 24 (Mulberry Street), Louisville, Georgia
- Coordinates: 32.99994°N 82.40929°W.
- Part of: Louisville Commercial Historic District (ID93001469)
- NRHP reference No.: 78000991
- Added to NRHP: February 17, 1978

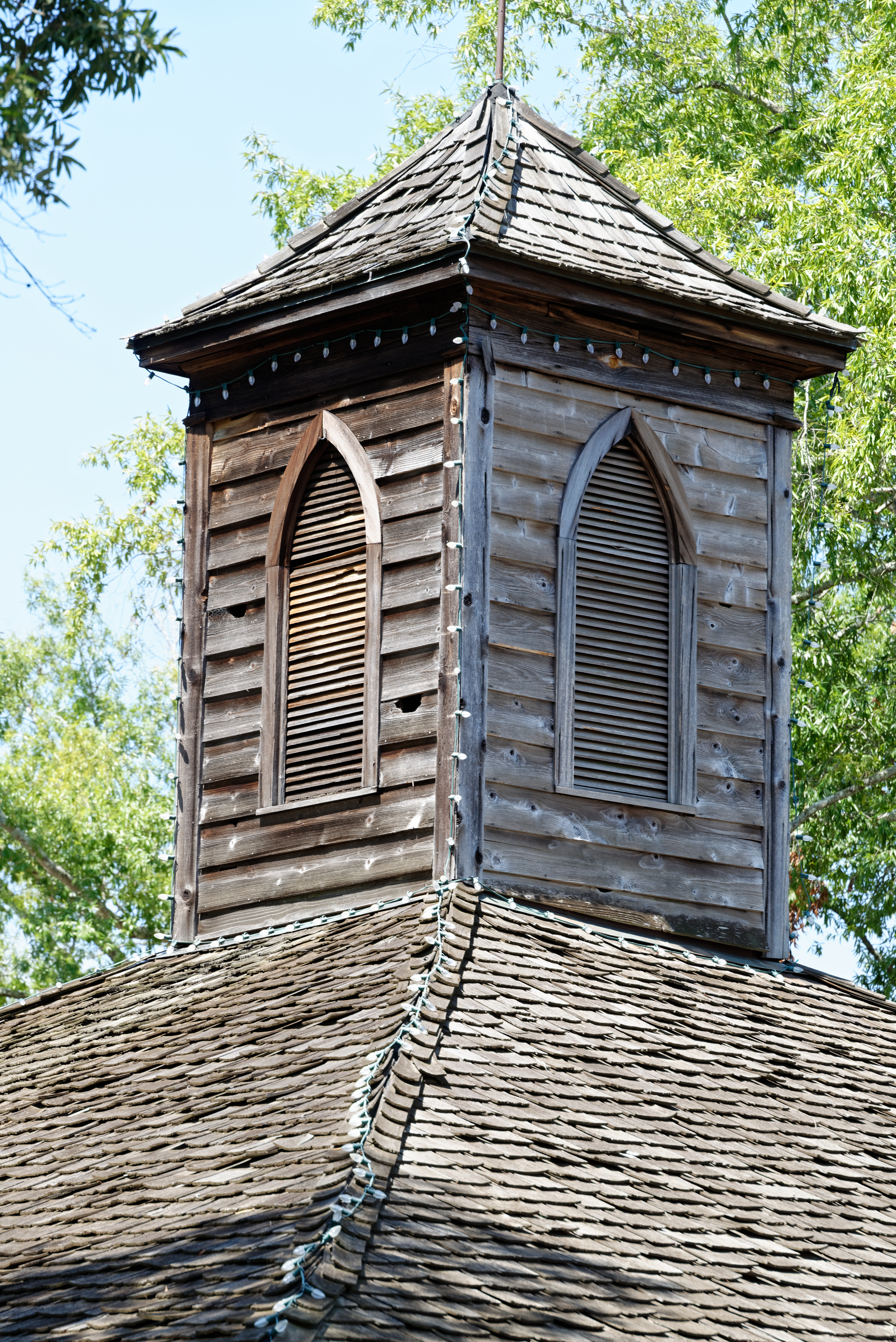
Top

The Old Market is a historic open-air structure in the middle of Louisville, Georgia. It was built around 1795 during the period when this town was the capital of Georgia. It was entered into the National Register of Historic Places on February 17, 1978. The structure was built as a public market but was also sometimes used as a slave market. Amid the George Floyd protests in 2020, the city council of Louisville voted to have the structure removed from the town.

== History ==
The Old Market is four-sided (24 feet each) open-air shed with a pyramid-shaped roof. There is a steeple at the top containing a bell. Four heavy wooden timbers support each side. A new roof and a cement floor were added to the structure in the 1950s, and the timbers (which are now badly rotted) were later reinforced with iron.

The structure sits midway on a mall in the middle of Broad Street, at the intersection of Mulberry Street. It is currently surrounded by a low brick wall and shrubbery, all of recent origin.

The market was built sometime between 1795 and 1798, based on extant newspapers of the time and other historical records. It was originally constructed as a "market house" to be used for official sales such as property and furniture. However it was known to be used to sell slaves, and has commonly been called the "Slave Market" in recent years. A few sources suggest that "recent research casts doubt on the contention that it was used to sell slaves;" however, none of these sources provide supporting citations to any such research, so the suggestion is questionable.

In June 2020 amid the George Floyd protests, a petition circulated in Louisville to have the Old Market removed from the town, which quickly gained 4,000 signatures. The town population was 2,500, about 30% of whom were Black. On June 13, 2020, a protest took place in the town attended by hundreds of people, and one of their demands was that the market had to go. On August 11, 2020, the city council of Louisville voted four to one to remove the structure from the town's downtown area, although the structure is yet to be removed.

== See also ==
- Louisville Commercial Historic District
- National Register of Historic Places listings in Jefferson County, Georgia
- Slave markets and slave jails in the United States
