= Edward Rhodes Carswell =

American politician

Edward Rhodes Carswell (1813 – 1862) was a member of the Georgia General Assembly House of Representatives from Jefferson County, Georgia and the father of Confederate States Army lieutenant colonel, Georgia militia brigadier general and Georgia state legislator Reuben Walker Carswell.

Edward Rhodes Carswell was born in Richmond County, Georgia. He was the son of James A. Carswell and Lavinia Rhodes Carswell. He married Mary C. Walker, daughter of Reuben Walker and Martha Jones Evans, on June 13, 1835, in Richmond County, Georgia. Their children were Ella M. Carswell, Reuben Walker Carswell, Mary Evans Carswell, Cornelia Evans Carswell and Martha Rhodes Carswell.

Edward Rhodes Carswell was a farmer and a state representative in the Georgia General Assembly. He died in 1862 in Jefferson County, Georgia.
