= Conyers Residential Historic District =

Historic district in Georgia, United States

- U.S. National Register of Historic Places
- U.S. Historic district
- Location within Metro Atlanta Location within Georgia Location within the United States
- Location: NW of the central business district, roughly along Main St., Milstead Ave., and Railroad St., Conyers, Georgia
- Coordinates: 33°40′15″N 84°1′13″W
- Area: 85 acres (34 ha)
- Built: 1840
- Architect: Neel Reid, Willis F. Denny
- Architectural style: Mid 19th Century Revival, Late 19th and 20th Century Revivals, Late Victorian
- NRHP reference No.: 90000947
- Added to NRHP: July 5, 1990

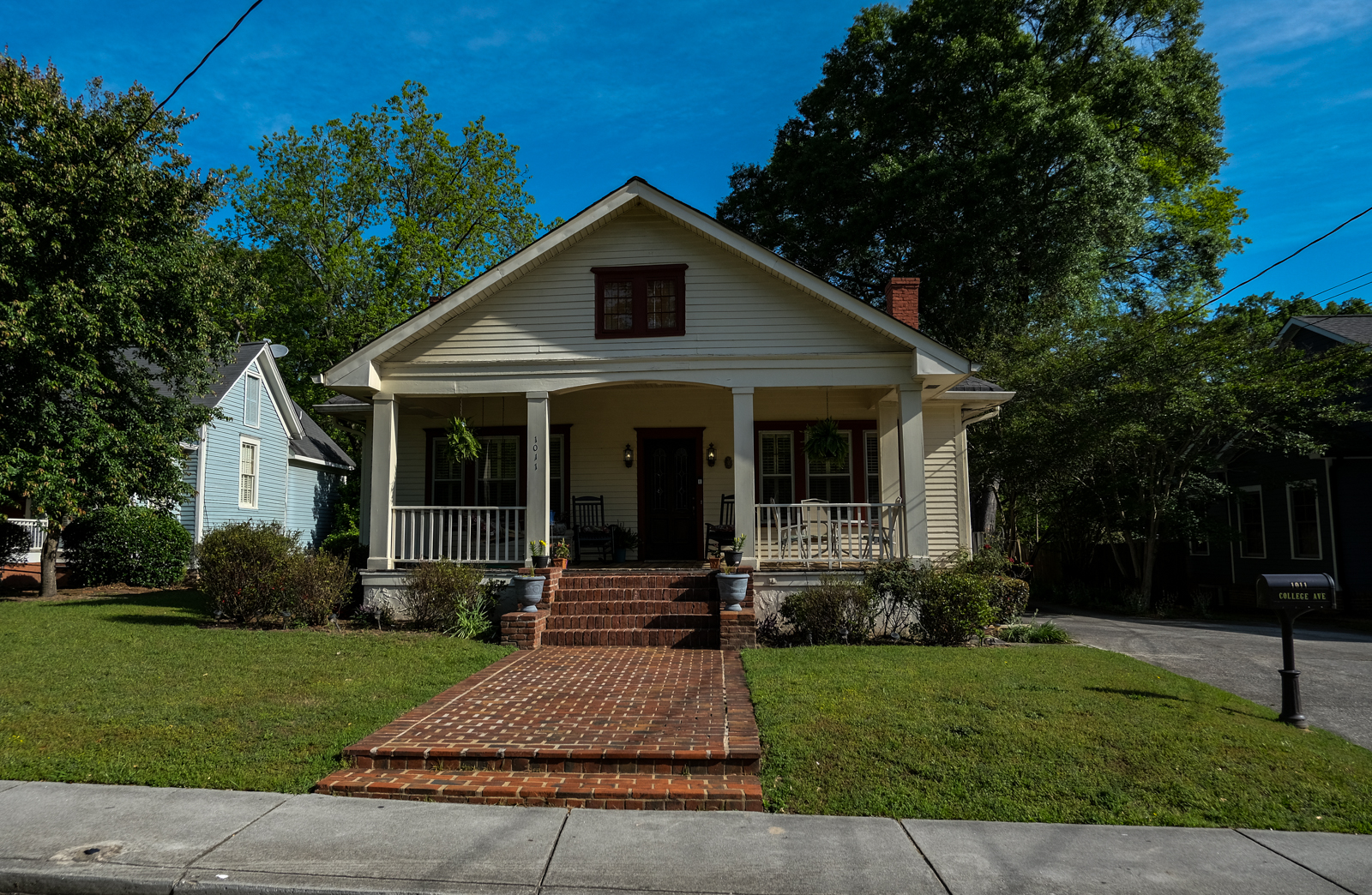
Craftsmen Bungalow within Conyers Commercial Historic District

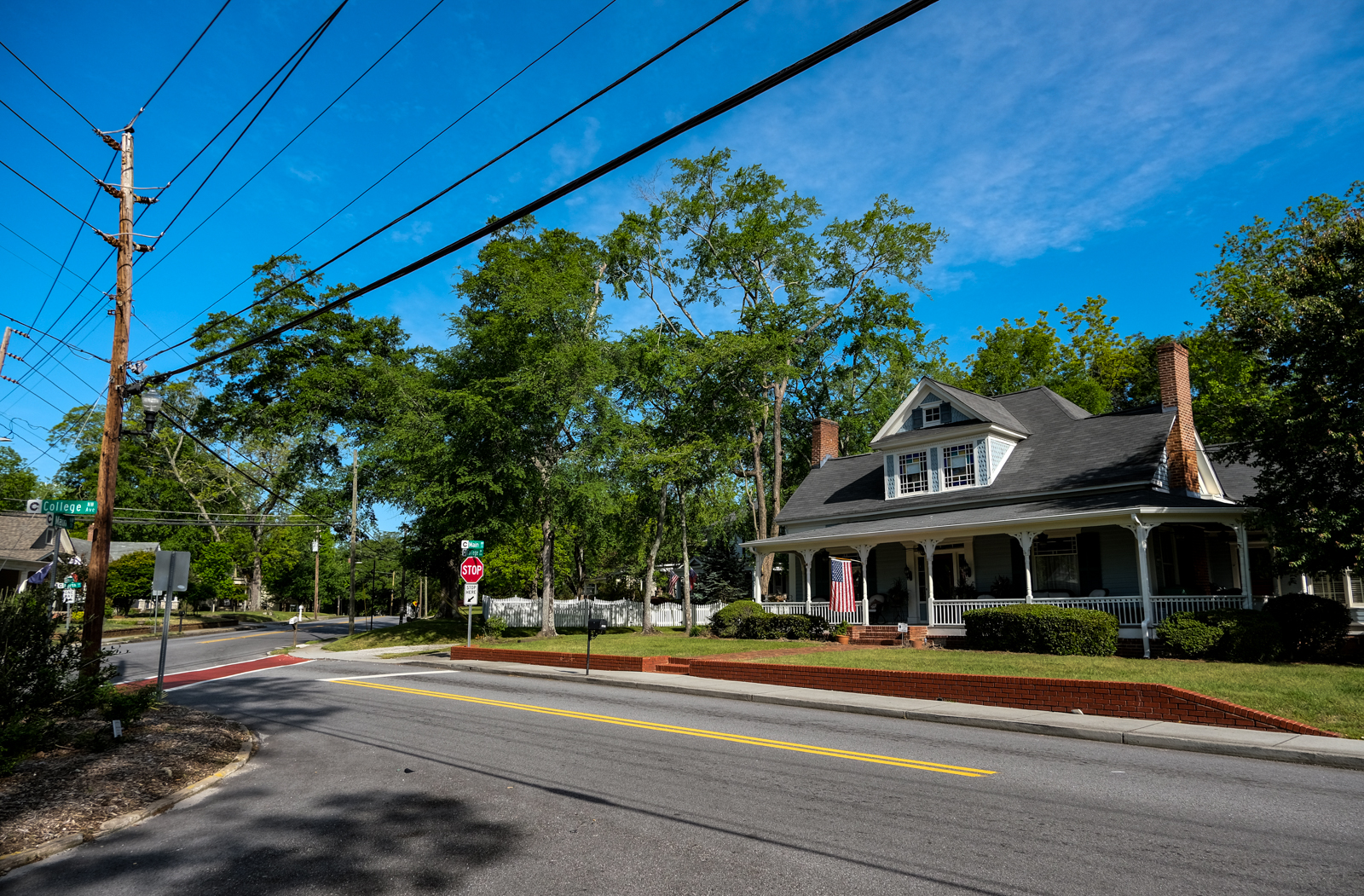
College Ave that runs through Conyers Commercial Historic District.

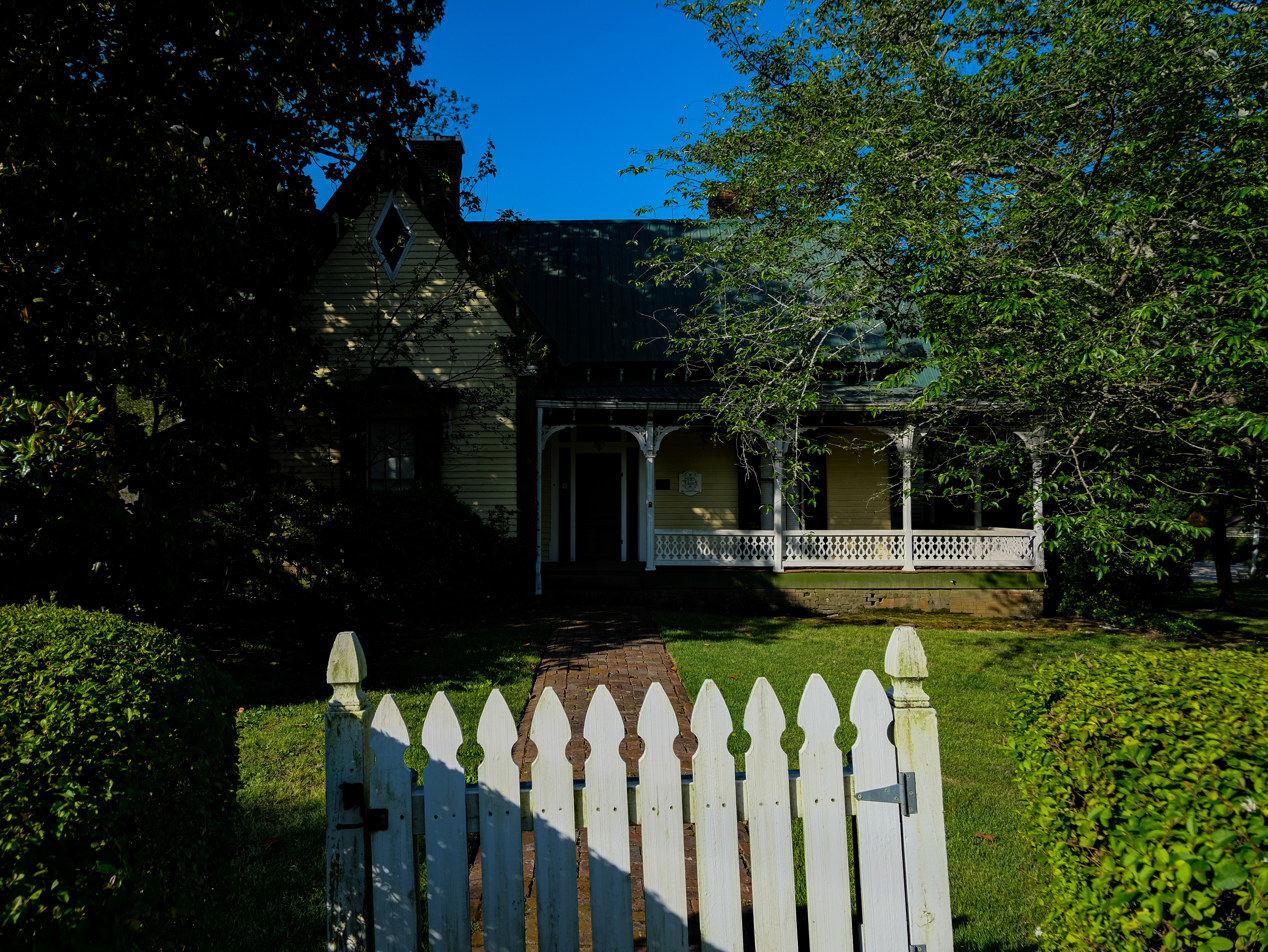
Almand-O'Kelley-Walker House - also on the National Register of Historical Places within Conyers Residential Historic District.

The Conyers Residential Historic District is an irregularly-shaped historic district in Conyers, Georgia, the only city in Rockdale County, Georgia, located 24 miles east of Atlanta. The district's development dates from the 1840s.

It has examples of high style architecture, including the Pierce Home Place (c. 1840s) Greek Revival style, at 988 Milstead Avenue.

Atlanta architect Neel Reid designed the Langford House (1913, see photo 1), at 900 Main Street, which has a mix of Classical Revival and Italian Renaissance styles. It has identical side porches and a front porch with a columned portico.

Atlanta architect Willis Denny designed the Methodist church (1902, see photo 35), Late Gothic Revival, in red brick.

The district has three other churches:

- Presbyterian Church (1918, see photo 35), Late Gothic Revival, with granite veneer,
- Macedonia Baptist Church (1925, see photo 26), Late Gothic Revival, with granite veneer, and
- Baptist Church (1938, see photo 9), has elements of Classical Revival, red brick, which has a columned portico main entrance.

It was listed on the National Register of Historic Places in 1990. It was deemed significant for its architecture and in the area of community planning and development, the latter "because it reflects how a small railroad town grew to accommodate not only the railroad but also the major roads leading to other nearby towns. It was this irregular growth, rather than a planned grid pattern, which became the core of this district. The district developed in a radiating pattern from the wedge-shaped central business district. Railroad, Main, and Milstead are the three main arteries where development occurred."

In 1990, the district included 120 contributing buildings, one other contributing structure, and 16 non-contributing buildings.
