= Reuben Walker Carswell =

American politician

- Born: September 29, 1837; Louisville, Georgia, US
- Died: January 11, 1889 (aged 51); Louisville, Georgia, US
- Burial place: Louisville, Georgia, US
- Military career
- Allegiance: Confederate States
- Branch: Confederate States Army; Georgia militia
- Service years: 1861–1863; 1863–1865
- Rank: Lieutenant colonel (army); Brigadier general (militia)
- Conflicts: American Civil War: Seven Days Battles; Battle of Chancellorsville; Atlanta campaign; Battle of Ruff's Station; Battle of Atlanta; Sherman's March to the Sea; Siege of Savannah
- Other work: Lawyer, judge, state legislator

Reuben Walker Carswell (September 29, 1837 – January 11, 1889) was a lawyer, member of the Georgia State Legislature, Confederate States Army lieutenant colonel and brigadier general in the Georgia militia during the American Civil War, and, after the war, a lawyer and judge.

== Early life and education ==
Reuben W. Carswell was born at "Middle Ground" Plantation near Louisville, Georgia on September 29, 1837. His parents were Edward Rhodes Carswell, a State Representative in the Georgia General Assembly, and Mary Celesta (Walker) Carswell.

Carswell was educated in his home county, Jefferson County, Georgia and at Emory University from which he graduated in the class of 1856. He then studied law under future Confederate Major General (temporary) Ambrose R. Wright. After being admitted to the bar, he practiced law with his cousin, William Carswell. Reuben Carswell served as a Georgia state representative in 1858–1860.

In 1861, Carswell married a daughter of James Walker. They had four children: Edgar R., Reuben W., Margaret and Isabel.

== American Civil War ==
Reuben W. Carswell started his Civil War service on June 14, 1861 as a second lieutenant in the 20th Georgia Infantry Regiment. He was appointed captain in the 48th Georgia Infantry Regiment in March 1862. On March 22, 1862, Carswell was promoted to lieutenant colonel of the 48th Georgia Infantry. The 48th Georgia Infantry Regiment was in a brigade commanded by then Brigadier General Ambrose Wright, Carswell's mentor as a lawyer. Carswell performed with distinction during the Seven Days Battles and at the Battle of Chancellorsville.

After being elected a state representative to the Georgia State Legislature in 1863, Carswell returned to Georgia to serve in that office.

As the Union Army under Major General William T. Sherman began to advance in Georgia in May 1864, Georgia Governor Joseph E. Brown appointed Carswell a brigadier general in the Georgia militia. Carswell led the 1st Brigade of the Georgia militia in opposition to the Union Army under Sherman during the Atlanta campaign and Sherman's March to the Sea. The brigade fought at the Battle of Ruff's Station, now Smyrna, Georgia on July 4, 1864, the Battle of Atlanta on July 22, 1864 and during the subsequent siege of Atlanta until the fall of the city on September 2, 1864.

Governor Brown furloughed the militia for 30 days so the men could harvest their crops. The men returned in October and skirmished with Sherman's men along their march to Savannah, Georgia. Carswell's brigade set out early from Macon, Georgia and missed the Battle of Griswoldville, in which Sherman's forces decimated the other brigades of Georgia militia that attacked a Union brigade at Griswoldville, near Macon. Carswell commanded his brigade at Savannah in December 1864 until the city fell to the Union force. As Sherman took his men to South Carolina, the Georgia militia remained in its home state. Carswell surrendered to the Union Army on May 20, 1865, at Augusta, Georgia. He was paroled as a brigadier general of Georgia militia.

== Later life ==
Carswell returned to his law practice after the war. He was elected judge of the Superior Courts of the Middle Circuit of Georgia in 1880. Ill health forced him to resign six years later.

Reuben Walker Carswell died at his home in Louisville, Georgia, on January 11, 1889. He is buried at New Cemetery in Louisville, Georgia.

On July 13, 1933, Mrs. Belle Stokes Carswell Hudson applied for a Confederate widow's pension from the State of Florida as the widow of Reuben Walker Carswell, having married him in February 1881. The application also states that the applicant remarried in January 1889, after Carswell died, although in the same month that he died, and that she had lived in Florida since 1923.

== See also ==
- List of American Civil War generals (Acting Confederate)
