= Cuban Giants =

African-American professional baseball club

Information
- League: Independent (1885–1888; 1892-1899); Middle States League (1889-1890); Connecticut State League (1891); National Association (1907–1909); Independent (1910–c.19 15)
- Location: Trenton, New Jersey
- Established: 1885
- Disbanded: c. 1915
- Nicknames: Part of team split after 1896 to form Cuban X-Giants; Genuine Cuban Giants (1896–c.1915); Original Cuban Giants (1896–c.1915)

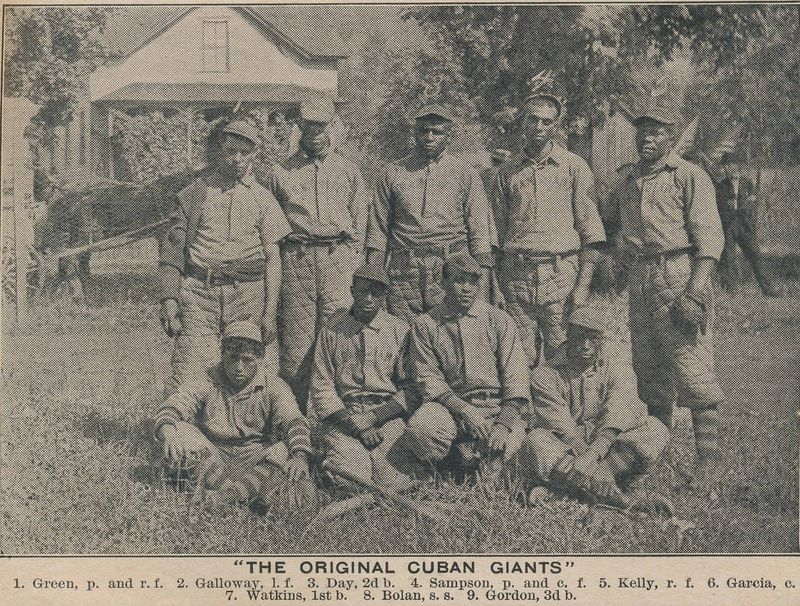
The 1902 Cuban Giants

The Cuban Giants were the first fully salaried African-American professional baseball club. The team was originally formed in 1885 at the Argyle Hotel, a summer resort in Babylon, New York. Initially an independent barnstorming team, they played games against opponents of all types: major and minor league clubs, semiprofessional teams, even college and amateur squads. They would go on to join various short-lived East Coast leagues, and in 1888 became the "World Colored Champions". Despite their name, no Cubans played on the team. The "Cubes" remained one of the premier Negro league teams for nearly 20 years, and served as a model that future black teams would emulate.

== History ==
=== Name ===
Early newspaper accounts mention John Lang (the team's early financial backer) and refer to the team alternately as "Lang's colored giants" or "Lang's Cuban Giants", emphasizing the size of the players, with one newspaper noting that "nearly every man is six feet in height". Jerry Malloy, a baseball journalist and researcher, believes that the team was likely named after the National League's New York Giants; while Michael E. Lomax theorizes that they may have considered themselves "giants among the black independents" of the era because they were born out of a merger of three separate teams. Opinions also differ on how the word "Cuban" came to be used. There were no Cubans on the team, although a handful of players had played in Cuba prior to the creation of the team. The team would go on to play in Cuba, but the name predates those eventual trips. Malloy states that "avoiding the opprobrium of hostile white Americans by 'passing' as Cubans may have been a factor in naming the team" (Note: This is the same justification Sol White gave in a 1938 Esquire article: "when that first team began playing away from home, they passed as foreigners—Cubans, as they finally decided—hoping to conceal the fact that they were just American Negro hotel waiters, and talked a gibberish to each other on the field which, they hoped, sounded like Spanish." This account is likely apocryphal as it was not reported in contemporary accounts, nor did it appear in White's own History of Colored Base Ball (1907).) and that it might have been easier for management to schedule games if the team was seen as being composed of Cubans rather than African Americans. Lomax finds this reasoning to be problematic since it was widely known at the time that the team was made up of black players; according to him this reasoning "suggests that the Cubans were cowards and ashamed of their cultural heritage." Rather, Lomax believes the key to understanding "Cuban" lies in the team's status as both competitors and entertainers, as well as their skin color:

In terms of skin color, virtually every player, not to mention the ones who played in organized baseball, was a light-skinned black. Thus, the name 'Cuban' could have referred to their mulatto status, a stage name exemplifying their vaudevillian flair on the diamond instead of signifying their racial or ethnic heritage.

In 1896, unhappy with the ownership of J. M. Bright, several players left the team and were signed by E. B. Lamar Jr. of Brooklyn. This new team of ex-Cuban Giants was christened the "Cuban X-Giants". After the split, Bright's team would often be referred to as the Genuine Cuban Giants or Original Cuban Giants.

=== Early years ===
In July 1885, the Keystone Athletics of Philadelphia (an independent black semipro team formed by hotelman Frank P. Thompson) were hired by the Argyle Hotel on Long Island to play baseball for the hotel's guests. (Note: Sol White's account in his History of Colored Base Ball that Thompson formed the team from waiters and bellhops already employed at the Argyle is likely apocryphal. Evidence suggests that he got it backwards, according to Malloy "any duties the players performed… as waiters, bellhops, porters and the like were incidental to their primary obligation, which was to play baseball for the hotel’s guests.”) Later in August the team merged with two other semipro teams: the Orions of Philadelphia, and the Manhattans of Washington D.C. The new team was dubbed the Cuban Giants. S. K. Govern a native of St. Croix, Virgin Islands (formerly of the Manhattans) became the new team's field manager, while John Lang (a white businessman and former owner of the Orions) provided the financial backing. Together, Thompson and Govern developed a plan to keep the team financially secure: play all year. The two men leveraged their personal connections to schedule games during the winter months in Cuba and the newly forming resort hub of St. Augustine, Florida. Playing in Florida was already a well worn practice for Thompson's Athletics: they had played in St. Augustine at the San Marco Hotel during the winter of 1884; and, while evidence is limited, Govern's Manhattans may have played in Cuba as early as 1881 or 1882. The team's future seasons would follow this cycle: from April to October the Giants would implement a "'stay-at-home' travel schedule, playing games in New York, Connecticut, New Jersey, and Pennsylvania"; then they would head to Cuba for December and part of January, followed by Florida just in time for the "peak of the hotels' festive winter season."

By the time the Argyle closed for the season on October 1, 1885, the Cuban Giants had won six out of nine games played, losing two and tying one. They headed out on the road and faced their first major league opponent, the New York Metropolitans of the American Association, losing 11–3. On October 10, they faced off against another major league team: the Philadelphia Athletics. Once again the Giants fell short, losing 13–7, but the final score had little to do with the quality of play according to a correspondent with the Sporting Life:

Had it not been for Johnny Ryan, who officiated as umpire, the Athletics would have stood a good chance of being defeated by nine colored players, or the Cuban Giants as they are called. Lack of experience, weak attempts at running the bases, and the umpire's very partial decisions contributed to the defeat of the colored aggregation.

The Giants may, or may not, have played in Cuba their first year, but they did make it to Florida; and as they made their way back north that first spring they "played a series of games in every large city from St. Augustine to Philadelphia" winning forty straight, according to an article in the New York Age. That first road trip ended in Trenton, New Jersey. At the time, Trenton was without a representative in organized baseball: the Trenton Club of the Eastern League had recently relocated to Jersey City. John Lang had decided not to finance the Cuban Giants for the 1886 season, and in April a number of them were signed to the Trenton Browns by Harry Simpson. Through this reorganization of his independent club, Simpson hoped to both renew Trenton's interest in professional baseball and "capitalize on the novelty of a black team playing at a high caliber." His plan paid off almost immediately when his new club beat the Jersey Blues of Hoboken 8–7 at the Chambersbourg Grounds on May 3, 1886. Simpson's ownership of the team, however, would be short-lived: their success caught the eye of Walter I. Cook. Later in May, Cook (along with his partner John M. Bright) assumed control of the team with Govern acting as manager. (Note: Accounts differ regarding the change in ownership between Simpson and Cook. Malloy states that Simpson sold the team to Cook, while Lomax believes that Cook expressed an interest in buying the team, prompting Govern to negotiate a deal with him unbeknownst to Simpson.) Cook came from a wealthy family and was generous to the team with his money, especially when it came to illness or injuries. Cook was so well-liked that Govern and the players arranged a benefit game for him in which they played for free. According to Heaphy, it was Cook who first established salaries for the players; Sol White describes what the players could expect each week:

At that time salaries were according to position. Mr. Cook gave pitchers and catchers, $18.00 per week and expenses; infielders, $15.00 per week and expenses; outfielders, $12.00 per week and expenses.

Although Cook financed the team, S. K. Govern (and club secretary George Van Sickle) ran the day-to-day operations. Govern "signed players to one-year contracts, utilized the press to schedule games, and was even responsible for selling season tickets." On May 28, 1886, the Cuban Giants played the St. Louis Browns of the American Association at the Chambersbourg Grounds in front of a "good-natured, wildly enthusiastic assemblage of over two thousand people." Despite losing 9–3, the game marked the first time the Giants played for a sold-out crowd. Unfortunately, attendance figures like these were the exception, not the rule. As an independent team the Giants could not rely on a fixed schedule of league games, instead Govern booked games himself, offering large guarantees to major league clubs and smaller guarantees to minor league, local, or college teams. Scheduling games with lesser opponents often resulted in lopsided scores and uninteresting games, leading to sporadic home attendance and fluctuating gate receipts. This in turn led the Giants to schedule more road games, often playing weekend games in New York City and Hoboken, New Jersey. Their status as an independent club also meant the Giants were subject to player raids. In June 1886, Govern signed pitcher George Washington Stovey to a short-term contract. Stovey struck out eleven batters in the only game he would play as a Cuban Giant: a 4–3 loss to the Bridgeport team of the Eastern League. Unbeknownst to Govern, it seems Stovey had also signed a contract with the Eastern League's Jersey City Blues. Patrick Powers, manager of the Jersey City Blues, offered Stovey two hundred dollars per month in an attempt to lure him to the team and break his contract with the Giants; Stovey refused. A few days later, Powers went to Trenton with a notice from the Eastern League's president demanding that Stovey report to Jersey City the next day. Powers and the Eastern League essentially coerced the Giants into giving up their claim on Stovey: if they tried to enforce their contract with him, Eastern League clubs would refuse to schedule games with them. Unwilling to sacrifice future lucrative bookings with Eastern League teams the Giants relented.

In July 1886, the Meriden team of the Eastern League disbanded and withdrew from the league mid-season. The Cuban Giants applied to take their spot, hoping that league membership would provide a steady slate of quality opponents as well as protection from player raids. It appeared that the team's application would be accepted, and according to Govern, the only thing that needed to be worked out was whether the Giants would assume the Meriden team's schedule and low position in the standings or be given the opportunity to start fresh. Unfortunately, they were not given the chance: on July 20, the Eastern League rejected the Cuban Giants' application and continued the season with only five teams. Despite the fact that the league already counted black stars like George Stovey, Fleet Walker, and Frank Grant among its ranks, race was a driving factor in barring the Cubes entry. According to the Meriden Journal "the dread of being beaten by the Africans had something to do with the rejection of the application of the Cuban Giants." However, other factors were also at play: the Eastern League's 1886 season was a financial disaster brought on by "bad management, and an entire lack of harmony among the clubs" Indeed, two other teams had already withdrawn from the league by the time the Meriden squad dropped out in July. Moreover, because the Eastern League was a party to the National Agreement of 1883, its members had to abide by the National League's rule forbidding league clubs from scheduling games on Sundays. The Cuban Giants were reluctant to give up their profitable weekend bookings in Hoboken and New York, so this also played a part in the Eastern League's decision to reject their application.

J. M. Bright purchased the Cuban Giants from Cook in June 1887. Bright was able to get them into the Middle States League in 1889, as joining a league was something the team had been trying to do for some time. However, Bright was not nearly as well-liked as Cook, and had to deal often with renegade players. This would be the team's last year in Trenton. In 1890 the entire team fled and played as the Colored Monarchs of York, Pennsylvania. In 1891, the heart of the team fled to their rival, Ambrose Davis’ Gorhams of New York City, then called the Big Gorhams. This dismantling and reassembling of the team became routine year after year until 1896, when E.B. Lamar Jr. from Brooklyn bought the team from Bright, renaming them the Cuban X-Giants. Bright responded by putting together an inferior team calling them the "Genuine Cuban Giants" or the "Original Cuban Giants". The Cuban X-Giants had a successful ten-year run as one of the best black teams in the East.

=== Ponce de Leon Hotel ===
In the summer of 1885, around the same time the Cuban Giants were being formed, Henry Flagler made the decision to build the Ponce de Leon Hotel in St. Augustine. Flagler, a founder of Standard Oil, envisioned the hotel as a place where "he and his wealthy friends could find princely shelter from the harsh winters of the North." The hotel opened three years later on January 10, 1888. Osborn D. Seavey was the manager of the hotel, and had previously been the manager of the San Marco where he likely crossed paths with Frank Thompson. Through this connection with Seavey, Thompson was able to incorporate the Cuban Giants and black baseball into the "integrated network of leisure activities" offered by the hotel. The players were hired as waiters (just as the Athletics had been at the San Marco), but "their primary responsibility was to entertain the guests with their skills on the diamond". An 1889 article from the St. Augustine Weekly News puts it this way:

The colored employees of the Hotel Ponce de Leon will play a game today at the fort grounds with a picked nine from the Alcazar. As both teams possess some of the best colored baseball talent in the United States [,] being largely composed of the famous Cuban Giants, the game is likely to be an interesting one.

On one occasion, unable to schedule a game with a local club, the team played a squad made up of tennis players staying at the hotel. On another occasion, a game played against some of the hotel's guests was attended by ex-President Grover Cleveland at the invitation of Govern. If they could not find a worthy opponent the Giants would play intra-squad games amongst themselves.

In 1889 while at the Ponce de Leon, Thompson put together an organization called the Progressive Association of the United States of America (PAUSA). Thompson was elected president of the organization, and Govern was elected secretary. Ben Holmes, the team's third baseman, was also an active member of the group. Thompson used his position to preach against "the unpardonable sin of racial prejudice practiced in the dining room of the Ponce de Leon" and the Cuban Giants served as an example of the doctrine of racial solidarity and self-help that the group espoused. The racially integrated PAUSA also promoted the idea of black-white cooperation for practical, as well as ideological, reasons: Thompson and Govern's efforts to eliminate racial barriers simultaneously created jobs for their players during the winter, while also promoting "the black game to the white spectator."

=== Cuba ===
"The Giants … played a number of winters in Havana, Cuba". The Giants had discovered that the key to being financially stable was to play baseball all year round. Cuba was a perfect place for them to play their winter seasons, because they could avoid the cold temperatures that were common in New Jersey in the winter, and they drew huge crowds when they played in Havana. They were so popular in fact that they played "in front of as many as 15,000 fans". By comparison, the average attendance per game for the Philadelphia Baseball Grounds, a popular baseball venue at the time, in 1890 was 2,231 per game.

== Players ==
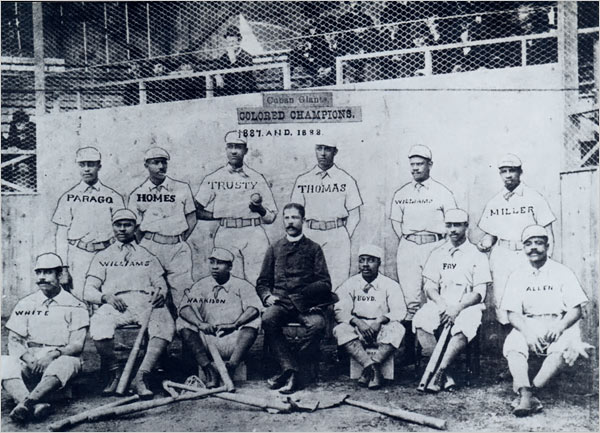
The 1887–1888 Cuban Giants

Some of the prominent players were:

- Ben Boyd
- Frank Grant, infield
- Abe Harrison, shortstop
- Andrew Jackson
- Oscar Jackson
- William Jackson
- John Nelson, pitcher
- John "Pat" W. Patterson, third base
- William Selden, pitcher
- Arthur Thomas
- Sol White, infield
- Clarence Williams, catcher
- George Williams, infielder and captain

Among them Boyd, Harrison, Selden, Thomas, Williams, and Williams were members of the team by 1886, its first full season.

== Timeline ==
- May 1885: Keystone Athletics formed in Philadelphia.
- July 1885: Keystone Athletics relocated to Babylon, Long Island.
- August 1885: The Keystone Athletics join the Manhattans of Washington, D.C., and Philadelphia Orions, creating the Cuban Giants.
- Fall 1885: Giants recorded as playing the major league New York Metropolitans (lost 11–3) and Philadelphia Athletics (lost 13–7). Both games are pitched by Shep Trusty
- Winter 1885-86: Cuban Giants play in Cuba
- Spring 1886: The team is bought by Walter E. Simpson who sets up home base at the Chambersburg Grounds in Trenton, New Jersey. The Cuban Giants win the first 40 games, losing 9–3 to the St. Louis Browns, a major league team (May 28, 1886).
- Summer 1886: Team sold to Walter I. Cook. First full season of summer baseball for the Giants begins.
- June, 1886: S.K. Govern signs George Washington Stovey to the Cuban Giants. On the 25th, in his first and only game with the Giants, he struck out eleven batters from Bridgeport of the Eastern League, losing 4–3.
- July 21, 1886: Shep Trusty pitches a 9–4 win over the Cincinnati Reds. Five days later, he beats the Kansas City Cowboys 3–2, and next loses to the same team 13–4.
- August 13, 1886: The first meeting between the New York Gorhams and the Cuban Giants ends with a Cuban Giants victory, 25–4.
- December 1886 – January 1887: Cuban Giants play in Cuba again.
- June 1887: J.M. Bright buys the Cuban Giants from Walter Cook.
- 1888: The Cuban Giants join the Middle States League. They were briefly associated with the Hudson River League (as were the 'colored' New York Gorhams); the league folded less than two weeks later.
- August 1888: The Cuban Giants win the round-robin Colored Championship Series over the Pittsburgh Keystones, New York Gorhams and the Norfolk Red Sox.
- 1889: The team's last year in Trenton, the Cuban Giants join the Middle States League.
- 1890: Entire team leaves and plays as the Colored Monarchs of York, Pennsylvania.
- 1891: The Cuban Giants join the Connecticut State League.
- 1891: Mid-season, a good portion of the Cuban Giants, under J.M. Bright's control, leave for the Gorhams managed by S.K. Govern, now called the Big Gorhams. The Giants reassemble annually under Bright.
- 1894: The Cuban Giants were Eastern champions.

== Works cited ==
- Browne, Paul (Fall 2011). "You Can't Tell the Players". Black Ball. 4 (2). McFarland & Company, Inc.: 55–66. doi:10.3172/BLB.4.2.55. ISSN 1939-8484.
- Harlow, Alvan F. (September 1938). "Unrecognized Stars". Esquire. X (3).
- Heaphy, Leslie (2003). The Negro leagues, 1869-1960. Jefferson, NC: McFarland & Company. ISBN 0786413808.
- Holway, John B. (2001). The Complete Book of Baseball's Negro Leagues: The Other Half of Baseball History. Fern Park, Florida: Hastings House Publishers. ISBN 0-8038-2007-0.
- Lomax, Michael E. (2003). Black baseball entrepreneurs, 1860-1901. Syracuse, New York: Syracuse University Press. ISBN 0815607865.
- Malloy, Jerry (1995). Introduction. Sol White's history of colored base ball, with other documents on the early Black game, 1886-1936. By White, Sol. Lincoln: University of Nebraska Press. ISBN 0803247710.
- Malloy, Jerry (2005). "The Birth of the Cuban Giants: The Origins of Black Professional Baseball". In Kirwin, Bill (ed.). Out of the Shadows. Lincoln and London: University of Nebraska Press. ISBN 9780803251533.
- Riley, James A. (1994). The Biographical Encyclopedia of the Negro Baseball Leagues. New York: Carrol & Graf. ISBN 0786709596.
- White, Sol (1995). Sol White's history of colored base ball, with other documents on the early Black game, 1886-1936. Lincoln: University of Nebraska Press. ISBN 0803247710.
