= Thomas Jefferson Academy (Georgia) =

Private school in Louisville, Georgia, United States

Location
- 2264 US Highway 1 N Louisville, Georgia 30434-5254; United States
- Coordinates: 33.019837°N 82.404778°W

Information
- Head of school: Andy Bonifay
- Teaching staff: 32 FTE
- Grades: K-3 - 12
- Enrollment: 263
- Student to teacher ratio: 20:1
- Campus type: Private school
- Colors: Royal blue and gold
- Athletics conference: 1 A
- Mascot: Jaguar
- Nickname: TJA
- Team name: Jags
- Accreditations: Georgia Independent School Association; Georgia Accrediting Commission
- Website: www.tjajags.com

Thomas Jefferson Academy is a private school in Louisville, Georgia, United States. It offers education for students in K3 through twelfth grade. Thomas Jefferson Academy is a member of Georgia Independent School Association (GISA).

Admission is by application and requires an entrance exam.

Thomas Jefferson Academy let the student body vote on a mascot. The students selected a jaguar, a native South American cat.

== History ==
Grades one through five were housed at the former Stapleton Academy building and grades six through twelve attended classes at the former Bartow Academy.

== Athletics and extra-curricular activities ==
Thomas Jefferson Academy offers many different sports throughout the year, with an equal number for girls and boys. These include football, basketball, baseball, golf, softball, and track. Thomas Jefferson Academy is most famous for its football state championship four-peat.

=== Class GISA Champions ===
Sport	State Championships
Girls' basketball	1995, 2014, 2020
Boys' basketball	2021
Boys' track	2005, 2006
Girls' track	2013
Baseball	1994, 1995, 2005, 2016, 2019, 2020, 2021
Football	1986, 1998, 2000, 2005, 2006, 2015, 2019, 2020, 2021, 2022
Softball	1981, 1982, 1983, 1994, 2011, 2014, 2018
Golf	2015, 2016

Thomas Jefferson Academy also offers Jr. Beta Club, Beta Club, Yearbook Staff, FCA (Fellowship of Christian Athletes), Drama Club, Key Club, literary competition, and a spring musical.
