= Inman Park–Moreland Historic District =

Historic district in Georgia, United States

- U.S. National Register of Historic Places
- U.S. Historic district
- Location within Atlanta Location within Georgia Location within the United States
- Location: Roughly bounded by N. Highland, Seminole and Euclid, DeKalb, and Degress and Washita Aves. (original); Roughly bounded by Cleburne, Moreland and DeKalb Aves., Battery Place and a city park. (increase)
- Coordinates: 33°45′50″N 84°21′7″W
- Built: 1870 (original) and 1889 (increase)
- Architect: Willis F. Denny
- Architectural style: Colonial Revival, Bungalow/Craftsman, Beaux Arts (original) and Mid 19th Century Revival, Late 19th And 20th Century Revivals (increase)
- NRHP reference No.: 86001209 (original); 03001016 (increase)

Significant dates
- Added to NRHP: June 5, 1986 (original)
- Boundary increase: October 13, 2003 (increase)

Inman Park–Moreland Historic District is a historic district in Inman Park, Atlanta, Georgia that was listed on the National Register of Historic Places (NRHP) in 1986. It includes the Kriegshaber House, now the Wrecking Bar Brewpub, which is separately NRHP-listed.

The district spans the Fulton County-DeKalb County border.

The district was increased in 2003.
