= Kriegshaber House =

Historic house in Georgia, United States

- Victor H. Kriegshaber House
- U.S. National Register of Historic Places
- Atlanta Landmark Building
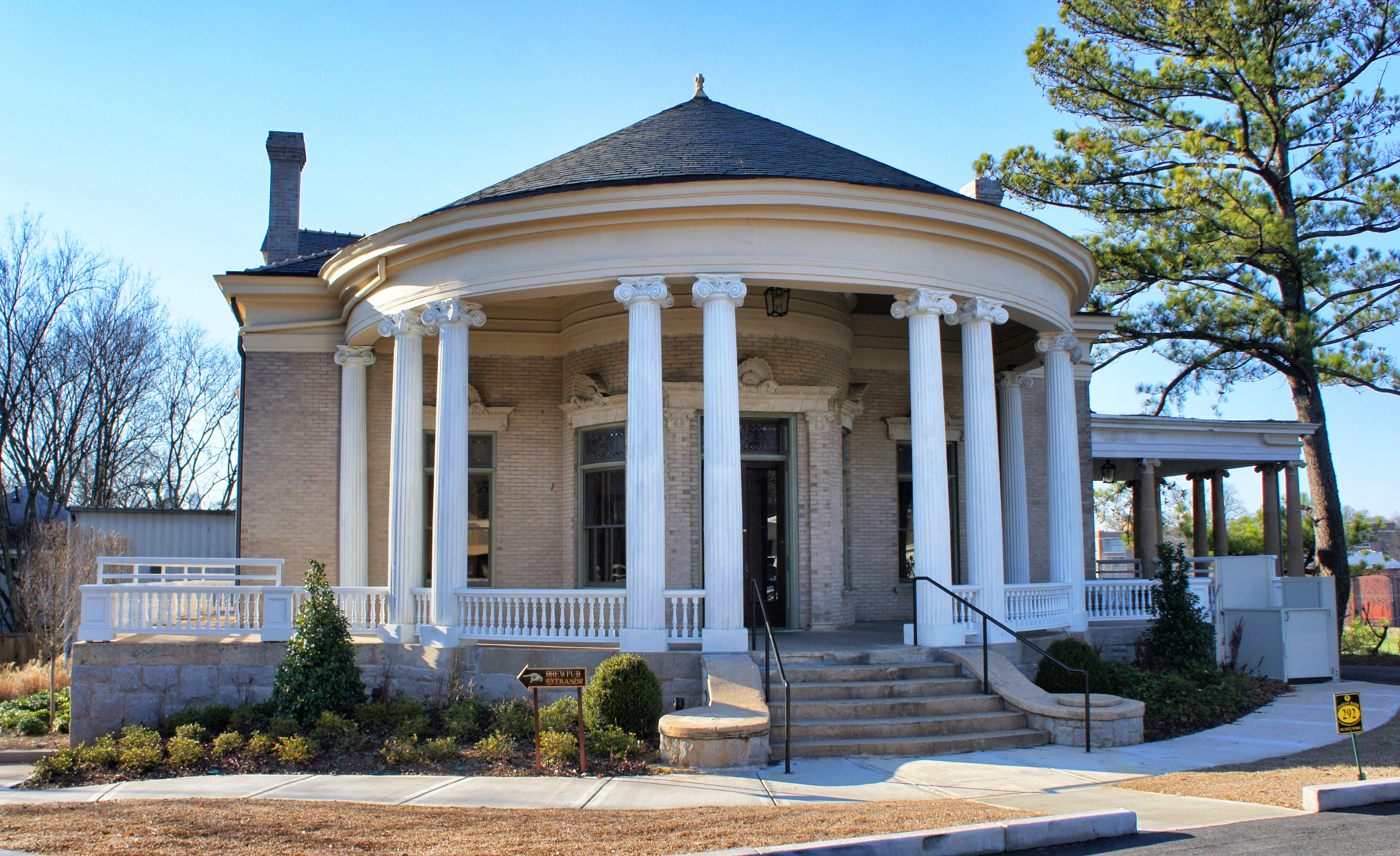

- Location within Atlanta Location within Georgia Location within the United States
- Location: Atlanta
- Coordinates: 33°45′44″N 84°20′57″W
- Built: 1900
- Architect: Willis F. Denny
- Architectural style: Late 19th and 20th Century Revival: Beaux-Arts
- NRHP reference No.: 79000723

Significant dates
- Added to NRHP: January 8, 1979
- Designated ALB: June 13, 1990

The Kriegshaber House, now the Wrecking Bar Brewpub, is a historic Beaux-Arts mansion on 292 Moreland Avenue NW in Inman Park, Atlanta. It was built around 1900. Victor Hugo Kriegshaber (1859–1934) was founder and president of the Atlanta Terra Cotta Company as well as director of the Atlanta Art Glass Co. and vice-president of the National Builders' Supply Association.

The building is listed on the National Register of Historic Places, both individually and as a contributing property to the Inman Park-Moreland Historic District but is also listed separately on the national register. The building is also designated as a historic building by the City of Atlanta.
