= St. Mark United Methodist Church (Atlanta) =

Historic church in Georgia, United States

- St. Mark Methodist Church
- U.S. National Register of Historic Places
- Atlanta Landmark Building
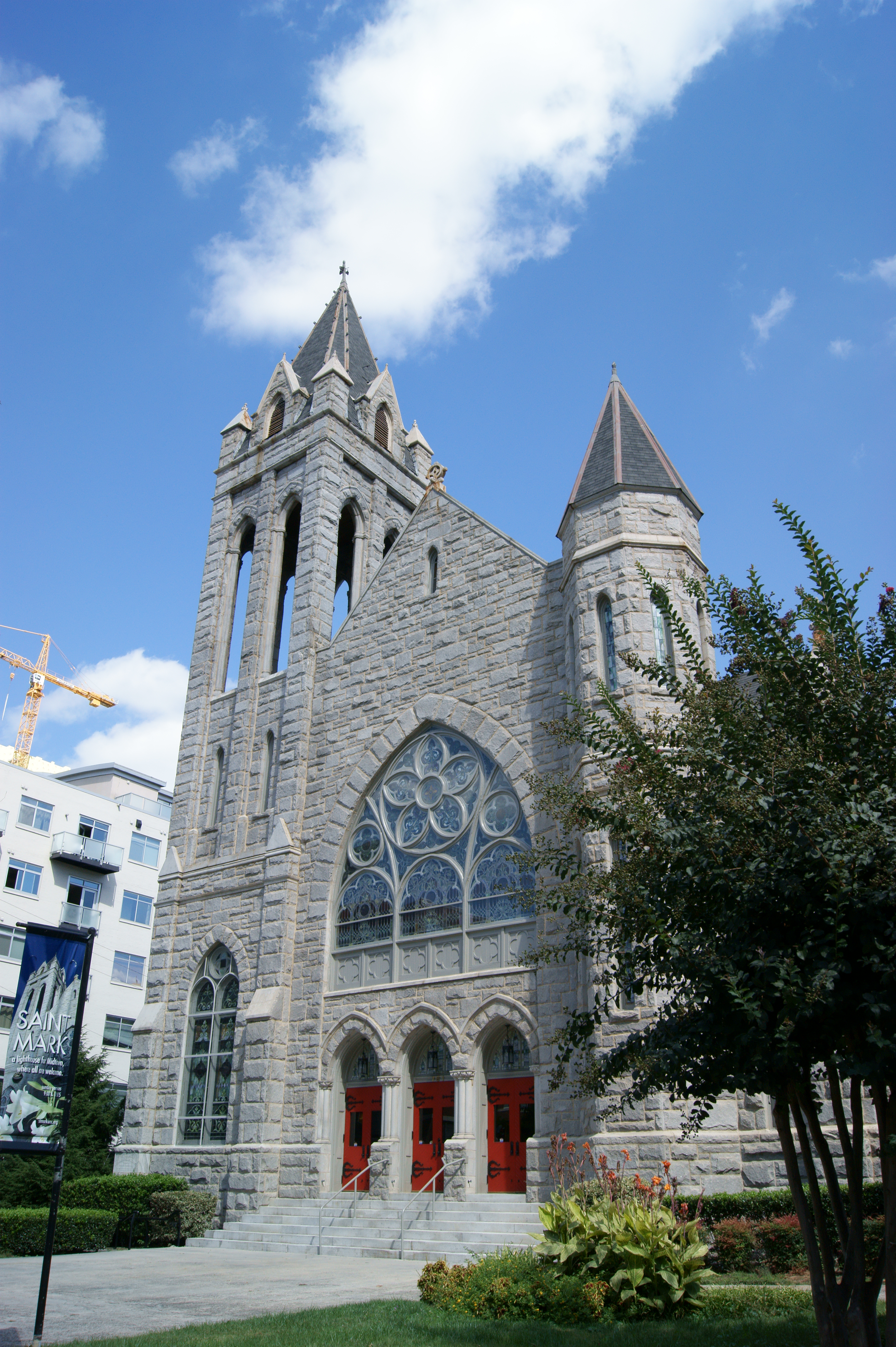
- St. Mark United Methodist Church in 2013

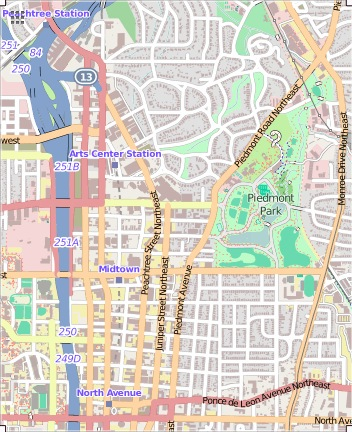
- Location within Atlanta Midtown Location within Atlanta Location within Georgia Location within the United States
- Location: 781 Peachtree Street NE; Atlanta, Georgia
- Coordinates: 33.7769°N 84.3839°W
- Built: 1903
- Architect: Willis F. Denny
- Architectural style: Gothic Revival architecture
- NRHP reference No.: 87001911

Significant dates
- Added to NRHP: November 2, 1987
- Designated ALB: October 23, 1989

Saint Mark United Methodist Church is a United Methodist Church in midtown Atlanta, Georgia. The building was constructed between 1902 and 1903 by the congregation of Merritts Avenue Methodist Church after they outgrew their previous building. The architecture is notable for its use of Stone Mountain granite, triple entrance portal, and pot-metal stained-glass windows. The building is one of the few Gothic Revival granite churches in Atlanta.

The building is listed on the National Register of Historic Places, and is also designated as a historic building by the City of Atlanta.

== History ==
The architect, Willis F. Denny also constructed two other granite Methodist churches that survive today. The congregation chose the location for Saint Mark Methodist Church to give them more room and to be in a less dangerous location than the "Tight Squeeze" area beyond the city limits. The twelve pictorial stained-glass works depicting scenes from the life of Jesus were installed gradually from 1909 to 1959.

On June 2, 1963, the newly-organized Southern Dames of America held its dedication ceremonies at the church.

In the early 1990s the church was on the verge of closing but the congregation ended up swelling to more than 1700 members during the decade. A fifteen-year series of renovations to the main sanctuary was completed in 2008.
