= Jefferson County School District (Georgia) =

School district in Georgia (U.S. state)

Address
- 1001 Peachtree Street Louisville, Georgia, 30434-1523; United States
- Coordinates: 32.628821°N 82.656098°W

District information
- Grades: Pre-school - 12
- Superintendent: Dr. Samuel Dasher
- Accreditation(s): Southern Association of Colleges and Schools; Georgia Accrediting Commission

Students and staff
- Enrollment: 3,526
- Faculty: 199

Other information
- Telephone: (478) 625-7626
- Fax: (478) 625-7459
- Website: www.jefferson.k12.ga.us

The Jefferson County School District is a public school district in Jefferson County, Georgia, United States, based in Louisville.

Its boundaries parallel those of the county. It serves the communities of Avera, Bartow, Keysville, Louisville, Stapleton, Wadley, and Wrens.

== Schools ==
The Jefferson County School District has two elementary schools, one middle school, and one high school.

Elementary schools:

- Carver Elementary School
- Wrens Elementary School

Secondary schools:

- Jefferson County Middle School
- Jefferson County High School

=== Academy ===
- Louisville Academy
