= Shep Trusty =

American baseball player

- Pitcher
- Born: May 10, 1860; Philadelphia, Pennsylvania
- Died: October 25, 1890 (aged 30); Atlantic City, New Jersey

Negro league baseball debut
- 1886, for the Cuban Giants

Last appearance
- 1887, for the Cuban Giants

Teams
- Cuban Giants (1886–1887)

Shepard B. Trusty (May 10, 1860 – October 25, 1890) was an American Negro league pitcher in the 1880s.

A native of Philadelphia, Pennsylvania, Trusty played for the Cuban Giants in 1886 and 1887. In 14 recorded appearances on the mound, he posted a 2.84 ERA over 111 innings. Trusty died in Atlantic City, New Jersey in 1890 at age 30.
