= WPEH (AM) =

- Louisville, Georgia; United States
- Frequency: 1420 kHz

Programming
- Format: Country music
- Affiliations: CNN Radio, Westwood One

Ownership
- Owner: Peach Broadcasting Co., Inc.

Technical information
- Licensing authority: FCC
- Facility ID: 52030
- Class: D
- Power: 1,000 watts day 159 watts night
- Transmitter coordinates: 33°0′48.00″N 82°23′33.00″W
- Translators: W278CO (103.5 MHz, Louisville)

Links
- Public license information: Public file; LMS

WPEH (1420 AM) is a radio station broadcasting a country music format. Licensed to Louisville, Georgia, United States. The station is currently owned by Peach Broadcasting Co., Inc. and features programming from CNN Radio and Westwood One.
