= Oscar Jackson (baseball) =

- Outfielder/First baseman
- Batted: Unknown Threw: Unknown

debut
- 1887, for the New York Gorhams

Last appearance
- 1906, for the Cuban X-Giants

Teams
- New York Gorhams (1887–1889); Cuban Giants (1888, 1890, 1893–1894, 1896); York Monarchs (1890); New York Big Gorhams (1891); Cuban X-Giants (1906)

Oscar "Oss" Jackson was an American baseball outfielder and first baseman in the late 19th century, who played for predecessor teams to the Negro leagues. He played for several teams from 1887 to 1906, spending the majority of his career with the Cuban Giants. He was the brother of fellow player Andrew Jackson.
