= Bartow Historic District =

Historic district in Georgia, United States

- U.S. National Register of Historic Places
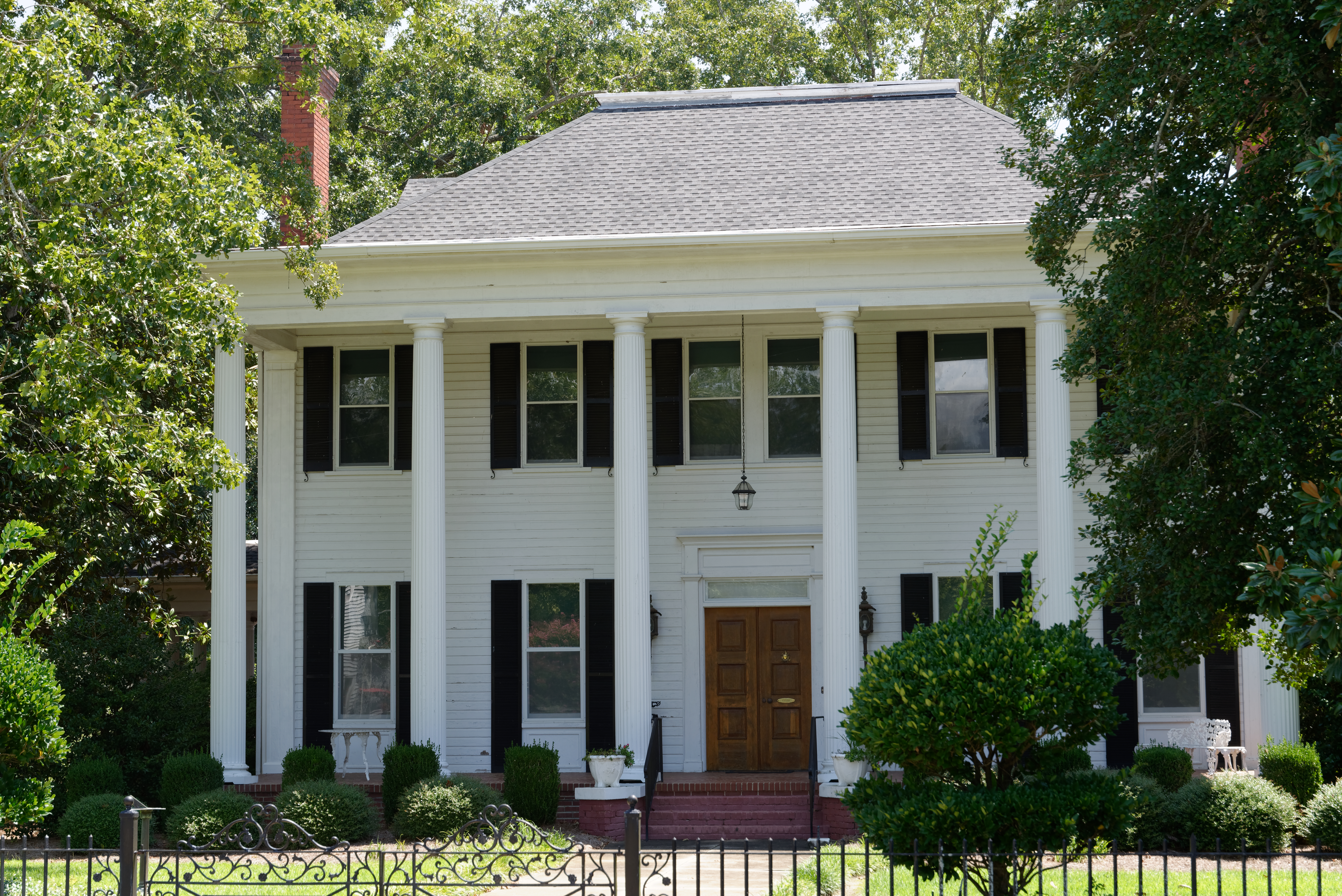
- Smith-Evans house

- Location within Georgia
- Location: Roughly centered along U.S. Hwy. 221, U.S. Hwy. 319 and the CSX rail line, Bartow, Georgia
- Coordinates: 32°52′45″N 82°28′27″W
- Area: 209 acres (85 ha)
- Built: 1887
- Architectural style: Queen Anne, Colonial Revival, Bungalow/Craftsman
- NRHP reference No.: 08001320
- Added to NRHP: January 13, 2009

Bartow Historic District, in Bartow, Georgia is a historic district which was listed on the National Register of Historic Places. The district included 121 contributing buildings, three contributing structures, and a contributing site. Its 209 acres (85 ha) area is roughly centered along Church St. (U.S. Highway 221), Wadley Road (U.S. Highway 319) and the CSX rail line.

It includes a variety of architectural styles, including Queen Anne, folk vernacular, Colonial Revival, and bungalow/Craftsman.

Selected buildings included are:

- Central of Georgia depot (1859), brick.
- Smith-Evans House (c.1916), 7261 Church Street - two-story house with monumental two-story front portico, with a heavy entablature, supported by six fluted Doric columns. Has a porte cochere.
- Bartow Bank (1906), one-story commercial with "marble-clad front facade with bands of light and dark marble on the cornice and decorative pink marble details", as well as "an elaborate balustrade-like parapet." The Bartow Bank opened in 1902 as Bartow's first bank; it failed in the 1920s as the cotton economy collapsed (with boll weevil infestations).
