= Abe Harrison =

- Shortstop
- Born: April 4, 1867; Norristown, Pennsylvania, U.S.
- Died: May 1, 1932 (aged 65); Hamilton Township, Mercer County, New Jersey, U.S.
- Batted: Right Threw: Right

debut
- 1885, for the Philadelphia Orions

Last appearance
- 1897, for the Cuban Giants
- Stats at Baseball Reference

Teams
- Philadelphia Orions (1885); Argyle Hotel Athletics (1885); Cuban Giants (1886–1897)

Abraham L. Harrison (March 4, 1867 – May 1, 1932) was an American baseball shortstop in the late 19th century, who played for predecessor teams to the Negro leagues. He played for several teams from 1885 to 1897, spending the majority of his career with the Cuban Giants.
