= WPEH-FM =

- Louisville, Georgia; United States
- Frequency: 92.1 MHz

Programming
- Format: Oldies
- Affiliations: Westwood One

Ownership
- Owner: Peach Broadcasting Co., Inc.

Technical information
- Licensing authority: FCC
- Facility ID: 52029
- Class: A
- ERP: 6,000 watts
- HAAT: 91 meters
- Transmitter coordinates: 33°0′48.00″N 82°23′33.00″W

Links
- Public license information: Public file; LMS

WPEH-FM (92.1 FM) is a radio station broadcasting an oldies format. It is licensed to Louisville, Georgia, United States. The station is currently owned by Peach Broadcasting Co., Inc. and features programming from CNN Radio and Westwood One.
