= Jefferson County Courthouse (Georgia) =

- U.S. National Register of Historic Places
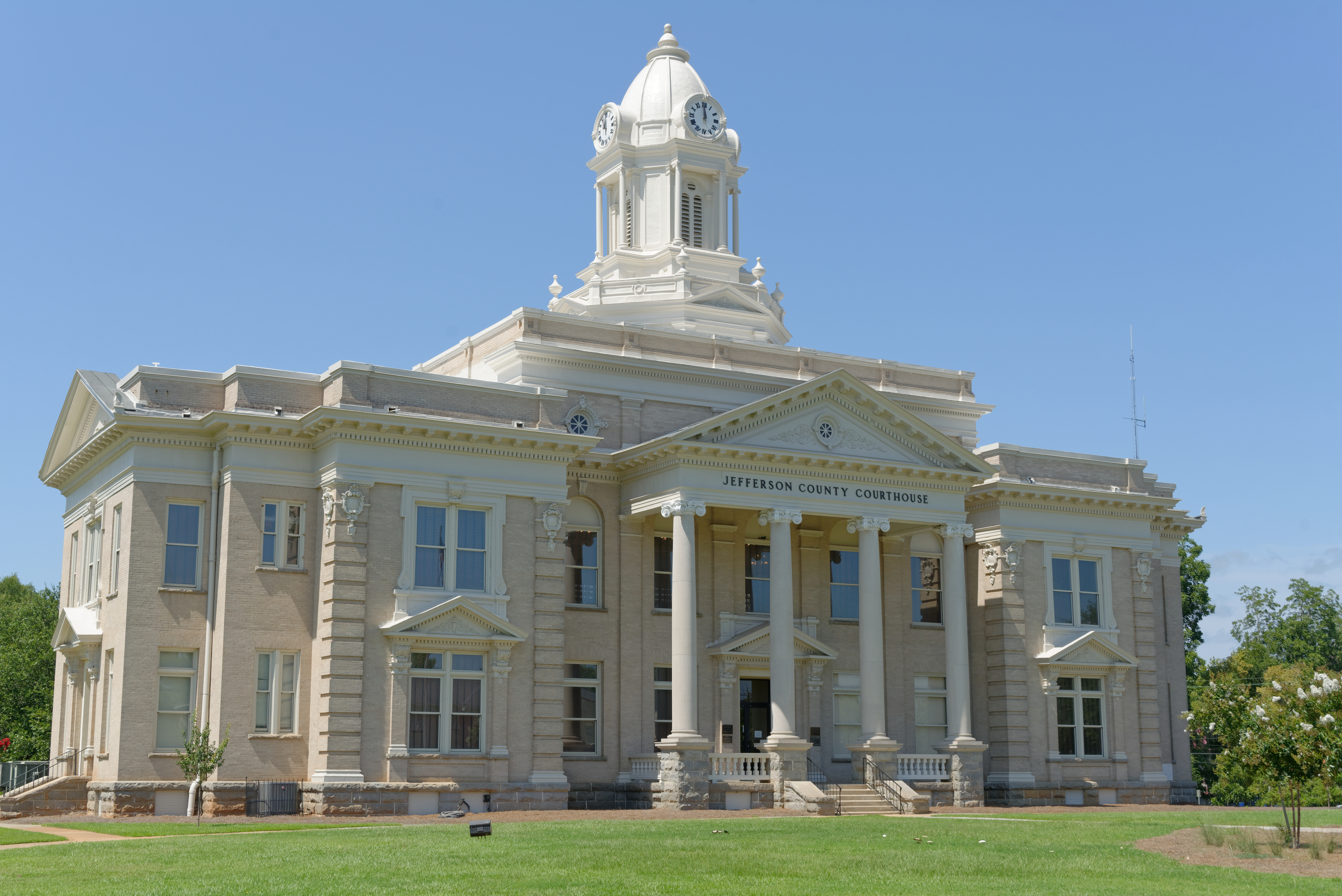

- Location within Georgia Location within the United States
- Location: Courthouse Sq., Louisville, Georgia
- Coordinates: 32°59′53″N 82°24′31″W
- Area: 4 acres (1.6 ha)
- Built: 1904
- Built by: Denny, W.F.; Heifner, F.P.
- Architectural style: Classical Revival
- MPS: Georgia County Courthouses TR
- NRHP reference No.: 80001099
- Added to NRHP: September 18, 1980

The Jefferson County Courthouse in Courthouse Square in Louisville, Georgia was built in 1904. It was listed on the National Register of Historic Places in 1980. It is also a contributing property to the Louisville Commercial Historic District.

It was designed by architect W.F. Denny who died in 1905, and was built by contractor F.P. Hiefner. It is Classical Revival in style. It has an Ionic tetrastyle entrance and Ionic pilasters.

It stands on the site of Georgia's "Old State House", the state's first capitol building; old brick and timbers of the historic building's foundation were found during construction.

== See also ==
- Louisville Commercial Historic District
