= Ben Boyd (baseball) =

- Second baseman / Outfielder
- Born: April 8, 1858
- Died: Maryland, US

debut
- 1885, for the Argyle Hotel Athletics

Last appearance
- 1891, for the Cuban Giants
- Stats at Baseball Reference

Teams
- Argyle Hotel Athletics (1885); Cuban Giants (1886–1891)

Benjamin F. Boyd (April 8, 1858 – death date unknown) was an American professional baseball second baseman and outfielder in the late 19th century, who played in predecessor teams to the Negro leagues. He played from 1885 to 1891, spending the majority of his career with the Cuban Giants. He also played in the minor leagues from 1889 to 1891.
