= Louisville, Georgia =

- City
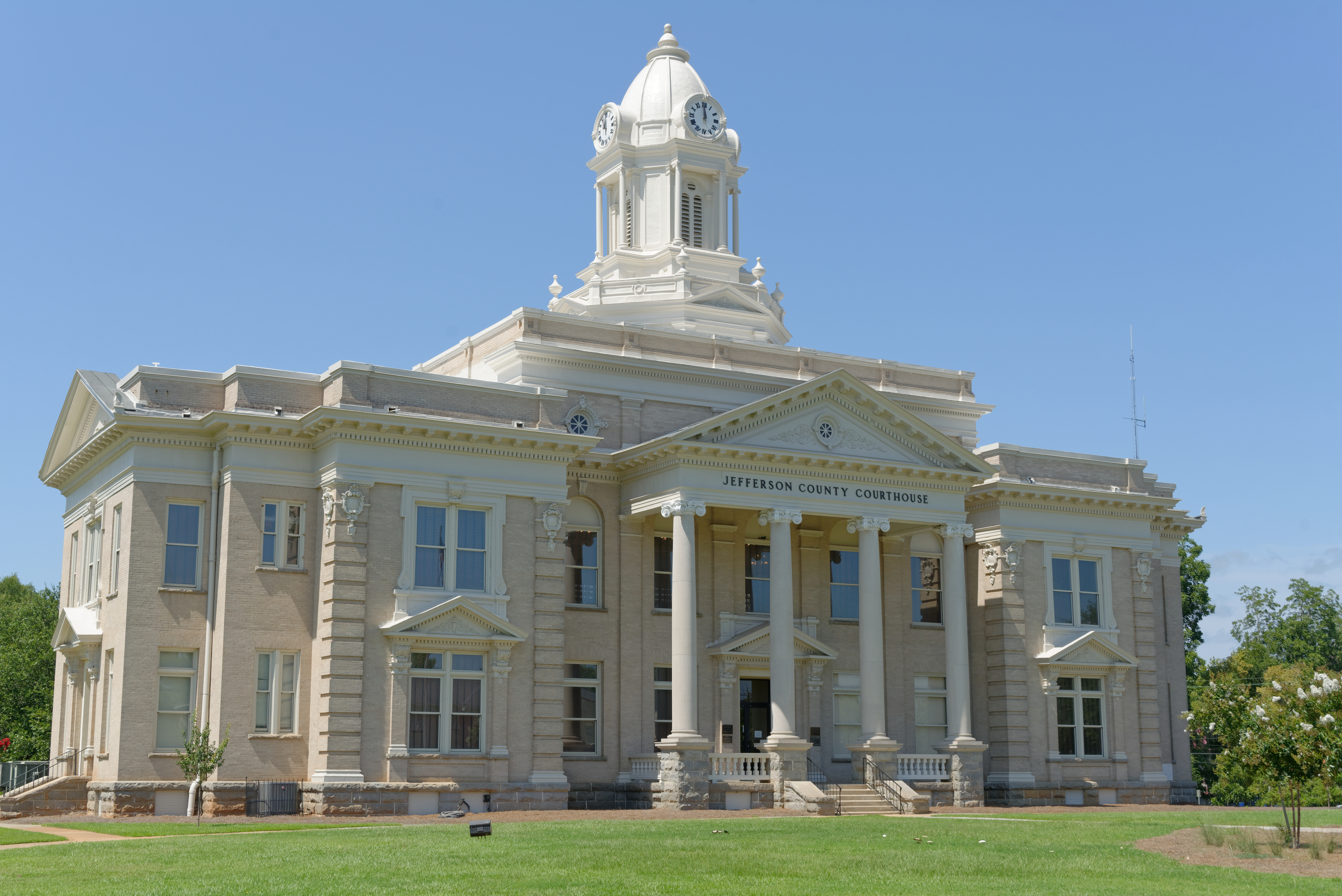
- Jefferson County Courthouse
- Motto: "A Capital Community"
- Location in Jefferson County and the state of Georgia

- Location of Louisville in the US
- Coordinates: 33°0′15″N 82°24′17″W
- Country: United States
- State: Georgia
- County: Jefferson
- Incorporated: January 26, 1786; 240 years ago
- Named for: Louis XVI

Government
  - Type: Mayor–Council
  - Mayor: Jenny Smith
  - Council: Members: Michelle Reaves; Matthew Hodges – Mayor Pro-Tem; Larry Atkins; Phil Polhill; Robert Dixon

Area
  - Total: 3.68 sq mi (9.53 km^{2})
  - Land: 3.61 sq mi (9.35 km^{2})
  - Water: 0.066 sq mi (0.17 km^{2})
- Elevation: 322 ft (98 m)

Population (2020)
  - Total: 2,381
  - Density: 659.3/sq mi (254.57/km^{2})
- Time zone: UTC-5 (Eastern (EST))
  - Summer (DST): UTC-4 (EDT)
- ZIP code(s): 30434
- Area code(s): 478
- FIPS code: 13-47560
- GNIS feature ID: 0332271
- Major airport: AGS
- Website: cityoflouisvillegeorgia.com

Louisville is a city in and the county seat of Jefferson County, Georgia, United States, and also a former state capital of Georgia. It is located southwest of Augusta on the Ogeechee River, and its population was 2,493 at the 2010 census, down from 2,712 at the 2000 census. By 2020, its population was 2,381. Its name is pronounced "Lewis-ville", though it and the differently pronounced city in Kentucky were both named for Louis XVI.

== History ==
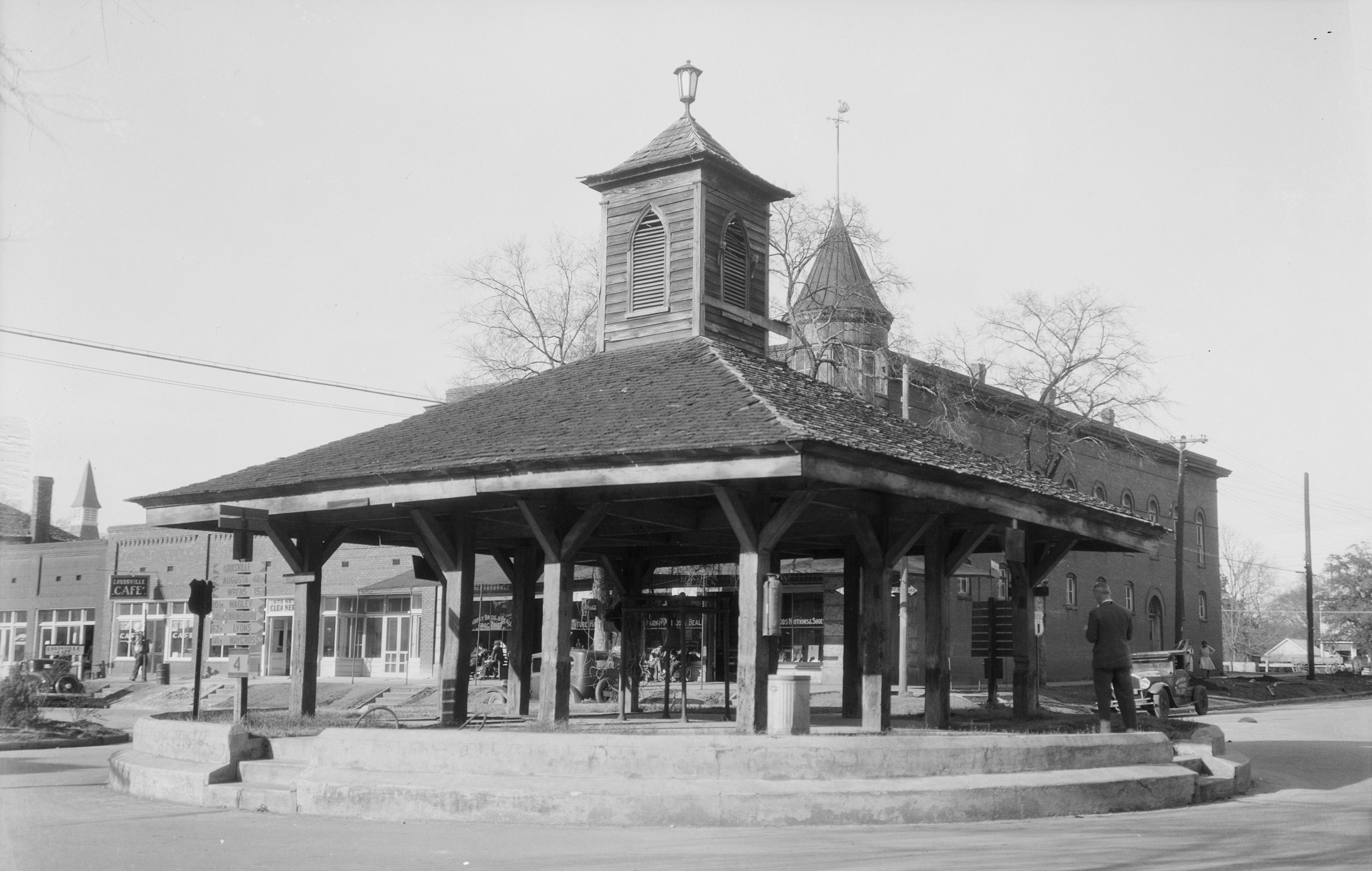
Old Market, 1934

Louisville was incorporated on January 26, 1786, as the prospective state capital, though it did not become so for a decade. Savannah had served as the colonial capital, but was considered too far from the center of population in the growing state, and Augusta became the state capital in the 1780s.

Louisville was named for Louis XVI, who had aided the Continentals during the American Revolutionary War and was still the King of France when the decision to incorporate the city was made. Development of the city took years, and its state government buildings were completed in 1795. An old Revolutionary War soldiers' cemetery is located on the western side of town.

The city of Louisville served as the state capital of Georgia from 1796 to 1806. It was a center of trade, legislators, and political influence. The Jefferson County courthouse, built in 1904, stands on the site of Georgia's first permanent capitol building.

Louisville's historic open-sided market house, Old Market, (Old Slave Market) still stands in the center of downtown. The original market had sections for sales of farm produce, household goods, and enslaved African Americans. The caption of a 1934 photograph in the Library of Congress proves the sale of enslaved Black people happened at this market, with details. The Old Market is listed on the National Register of Historic Places. Roads and other transportation routes intersected at the market square, the hub of the region when the town was the state capital. The state capital was moved to Milledgeville and later to Atlanta, in the Piedmont.

As a small city and county seat, Louisville now has few major businesses and industries. A marker dedicated to the Yazoo land scandal of the 18th century is located in front of the Jefferson County Courthouse. Queensborough National Bank and Trust Company was founded in 1902 and is currently headquartered in Louisville, on U.S. Highway 1.

== Geography ==
Louisville is located slightly south of the center of Jefferson County. U.S. Route 1 passes through the east side of the city, leading northeast 46 miles (74 km) to Augusta and south 30 miles (48 km) to Swainsboro. U.S. Route 221 passes through the north side of downtown as Peachtree Street and leads southwest 10 miles (16 km) to Bartow. US-221 leaves Louisville to the north, running with US-1 15 miles (24 km) to Wrens before continuing north toward Harlem.

According to the United States Census Bureau, Louisville has a total area of 3.7 square miles (9.5 km^{2}), of which 3.6 square miles (9.3 km^{2}) are land and 0.1 square miles (0.2 km^{2}), or 1.93%, are water. The western city boundary follows Rocky Comfort Creek, which flows into the Ogeechee River at the city limits' southwest corner. The Ogeechee flows to the Atlantic Ocean south of Savannah.

== Demographics ==
Historical population
Census	Pop.	Note	%±
1810	524		—
1820	694		32.4%
1870	356		—
1880	575		61.5%
1890	836		45.4%
1900	1,009		20.7%
1910	1,039		3.0%
1920	1,040		0.1%
1930	1,650		58.7%
1940	1,803		9.3%
1950	2,231		23.7%
1960	2,413		8.2%
1970	2,691		11.5%
1980	2,823		4.9%
1990	2,429		−14.0%
2000	2,712		11.7%
2010	2,493		−8.1%
2020	2,381		−4.5%
U.S. Decennial Census; 1850-1870 1870-1880; 1890-1910 1920-1930; 1940 1950 1960; 1970 1980 1990; 2000 2010

=== 2020 census ===
As of the 2020 census, there were 2,381 people, 899 households, and 606 families residing in the city.

The median age was 40.5 years. 24.1% of residents were under the age of 18 and 20.1% were 65 years of age or older. For every 100 females there were 86.7 males, and for every 100 females age 18 and over there were 81.8 males age 18 and over.

0.0% of residents lived in urban areas, while 100.0% lived in rural areas.

There were 899 households, of which 34.4% had children under the age of 18 living in them. Of all households, 31.6% were married-couple households, 18.1% were households with a male householder and no spouse or partner present, and 44.2% were households with a female householder and no spouse or partner present. About 31.4% of all households were made up of individuals, and 16.0% had someone living alone who was 65 years of age or older.

There were 1,038 housing units, of which 13.4% were vacant. The homeowner vacancy rate was 1.4% and the rental vacancy rate was 3.1%.

Louisville racial composition as of 2020
Race	Num.	Perc.
White (non-Hispanic)	633	26.59%
Black or African American (non-Hispanic)	1,615	67.83%
Native American	1	0.04%
Asian	25	1.05%
Other/Mixed	53	2.23%
Hispanic or Latino	54	2.27%

== Education ==
=== Jefferson County School District ===
The Jefferson County School District holds pre-school to grade twelve, and consists of two elementary schools, two middle schools, a high school, and an academy school. The district has 199 full-time teachers and over 3,526 students.

- Louisville Academy
- Carver Elementary School
- Wrens Elementary School
- Jefferson County Middle School
- Jefferson County High School

=== Private education ===
- Thomas Jefferson Academy

== Notable people ==
- William Wright Abbot III (1922–2009), historian
- John M. Berrien (1781–1856), US Senator and US Attorney General
- Reuben Walker Carswell (1837–1889), lawyer, politician, and Confederate officer
- Howell Cobb (1815–1868), former Governor of Georgia, Speaker of the House, US Secretary of the Treasury, and President of the Confederate States Provisional Congress
- Willis F. Denny (1874–1905), architect
- Clarence Ditlow (1944–2016), consumer advocate for automobile safety
- Roger Lawson Gamble (1787–1847), US Representative
- James Gunn (1753–1801), US Senator
- Kydran Jenkins (2002-) linebacker Purdue Boilermakers
- Herschel V. Johnson (1812–1880), former Governor of Georgia and candidate for vice president in the 1860 United States presidential election.
- Spike Jones (1947-), NFL punter (Houston Oilers, Buffalo Bills, and Philadelphia Eagles)
- Mirabeau B. Lamar (1798–1859), 2nd President of the Republic of Texas
- Tony F. Mack (1966-), Mayor of Trenton, New Jersey
- James Luther Mays (1921–2015), Old Testament scholar
- John Milton (1807–1865) former Governor of Florida
- Ambrose R. Wright (1826–1872), lawyer, politician, and Confederate general
- William Ambrose Wright (1844–1929), Georgia State Comptroller General

== See also ==
- Central Savannah River Area
- List of municipalities in Georgia (U.S. state)
- Local radio station: WPEH, Big Peach Radio (92.1 FM and 1420 AM)
- National Register of Historic Places listings in Jefferson County, Georgia
