= List of banks acquired or bankrupted in the United States during the 2008 financial crisis =

This is a list of banks in the United States affected by the 2008 financial crisis. The list includes banks (including commercial banks, investment banks, and savings and loan associations) that have:

- been taken over or merged with another financial institution,
- been declared insolvent or liquidated, or
- filed for bankruptcy.

The Federal Deposit Insurance Corporation (FDIC) closed 465 failed banks from 2008 to 2012.

== Banks ==
The Federal Deposit Insurance Corporation (FDIC) may assume deposits of banks or allow other banks to assume them. The largest banks to be acquired have been the Merrill Lynch acquisition by Bank of America, the Bear Stearns and Washington Mutual acquisitions by JPMorgan Chase, and the Countrywide Financial acquisition also by Bank of America. IndyMac Bank was also a large bank that was changed into a bridge bank by the FDIC, after its failure, until the funds can be disposed of. In addition, the investment bank Lehman Brothers filed for Chapter 11 bankruptcy protection in September 2008, citing bank debt of $613 billion and $155 billion in bond debt. The solvency of other U.S. banks was severely threatened, forcing the George W. Bush government to intervene with the $700 billion bailout plan of the Troubled Asset Relief Program.

As a result of the economic and financial crisis, over 65 U.S. banks have become insolvent and have been taken over by the FDIC since the beginning of 2008. Combined, these banks held over $55 billion in deposits, and the takeovers cost the federal government an estimated $17 billion.

The FDIC maintains a list of all banks that have failed since October 1, 2000.

=== 2007 (3 total) ===
Date	Company	Deposits and/or branches taken by	Type of company bankrupt or closed	Ref.
February 2, 2007	Metropolitan Savings Bank, Pittsburgh, Pennsylvania	Allegheny Valley Bank, Pittsburgh, Pennsylvania		
September 28, 2007	NetBank, Alpharetta, Georgia	ING Direct, Wilmington, Delaware	Retail and mortgage bank	
October 4, 2007	Miami Valley Bank, Lakeview, Ohio	Citizens Banking Corp, Sandusky, Ohio		

=== 2008 (26 total) ===
Date	Company	Deposits and/or branches taken by	Type of company bankrupt or closed	Ref.
January 25, 2008	Douglass National Bank, Kansas City, Missouri	Liberty Bank and Trust Company, New Orleans, Louisiana	Commercial bank	
March 7, 2008	Hume Bank, Hume, Missouri	Security Bank, Rich Hill, Missouri	Commercial bank	
May 9, 2008	ANB Financial, Bentonville, Arkansas	Pulaski Bank and Trust Company, Little Rock, Arkansas		
May 30, 2008	First Integrity Bank, Staples, Minnesota	First International Bank and Trust, Watford City, North Dakota	Commercial bank	
July 11, 2008	IndyMac Bank, Pasadena, California	IndyMac Federal Bank, an 'interim' bank set up by FDIC for disposal of assets	savings and loan association	
July 25, 2008	First National Bank of Nevada, Reno, Nevada; First Heritage Bank, Newport Beach, California	Mutual of Omaha, Omaha, Nebraska		
August 1, 2008	First Priority Bank, Bradenton, Florida	SunTrust Bank, Atlanta, Georgia		
August 22, 2008	The Columbian Bank and Trust Company, Topeka, Kansas	Citizens Bank & Trust, Chillicothe, Missouri		
August 29, 2008	Integrity Bank, Alpharetta, Georgia	Regions Bank, Birmingham, Alabama		
September 5, 2008	Silver State Bank, Henderson, Nevada	Nevada State Bank, Las Vegas, Nevada		
September 19, 2008	AmeriBank, Northfork, West Virginia	Pioneer Community Bank, Iaeger, West Virginia; The Citizens Savings Bank, Martins Ferry, Ohio	Savings and loan association	
September 25, 2008	Washington Mutual, Seattle, Washington	JPMorgan Chase	savings and loan association	
October 10, 2008	Main Street Bank, Northville, Michigan	Monroe Bank & Trust, Monroe, Michigan	Commercial bank	
October 10, 2008	Meridian Bank, Eldred, Illinois	National Bank, Hillsboro, Illinois	Commercial bank	
October 24, 2008	National City Corp., Cleveland, Ohio	PNC Financial Services, Pittsburgh, Pennsylvania	Funded by TARP funds.	
October 24, 2008	Alpha Bank & Trust, Alpharetta, Georgia	Stearns Bank, National Association, St. Cloud, Minnesota		
October 31, 2008	Freedom Bank, Bradenton, Florida	Fifth Third Bank, Grand Rapids, Michigan	Commercial bank	
November 7, 2008	Franklin Bank, S.S.B, Houston, Texas	Prosperity Bank, El Campo, Texas	Savings and loan association	
November 7, 2008	Security Pacific Bank, Los Angeles, California	Pacific Western Bank, Los Angeles, California	Commercial bank	
November 21, 2008	The Community Bank, Loganville, Georgia	Bank of Essex, Tappahannock, Virginia	Commercial bank	
November 21, 2008	Downey Savings and Loan, Newport Beach, California	U.S. Bank, Minneapolis, Minnesota	Savings and loan association	
November 21, 2008	PFF Bank and Trust, Pomona, California	U.S. Bank, Minneapolis, Minnesota	Savings and loan association	
December 5, 2008	First Georgia Community Bank, Jackson, Georgia	United Bank, Zebulon, Georgia	Commercial bank	
December 12, 2008	Haven Trust Bank, Duluth, Georgia	BB&T Company, Winston-Salem, North Carolina	Commercial bank	
December 12, 2008	Sanderson State Bank, Sanderson, Texas	The Pecos County State Bank, Fort Stockton, Texas	Commercial bank	
December 31, 2008	Wachovia Bank, Charlotte, North Carolina	Wells Fargo Bank, San Francisco, California	Commercial bank	

=== 2009 (140 total) ===
Date	Company	Deposits and/or branches taken by	Type of company bankrupt or closed	Ref.
January 16, 2009	National Bank of Commerce, Berkeley, Illinois	Republic Bank of Chicago, Oak Brook, Illinois	Commercial bank	
January 16, 2009	Bank of Clark County, Vancouver, Washington	Umpqua Bank, Roseburg, Oregon	Commercial bank	
January 23, 2009	1st Centennial Bank, Redlands, California	First California Bank, Westlake Village, California	Commercial bank	
January 30, 2009	MagnetBank, Salt Lake City, Utah	closed; FDIC payout of insured deposits	Commercial bank	
January 30, 2009	Suburban Federal Savings Bank, Crofton, Maryland	Bank of Essex, Tappahannock, Virginia	Savings and loan association	
January 30, 2009	Ocala National Bank, Ocala, Florida	CenterState Bank of Florida, Winter Haven, Florida	Commercial bank	
February 6, 2009	FirstBank Financial Services, McDonough, Georgia	Regions Bank, Birmingham, Alabama		
February 6, 2009	Alliance Bank, Culver City, California	California Bank & Trust, San Diego, California	Commercial bank	
February 6, 2009	County Bank, Merced, California	Westamerica Bank, San Rafael, California	Commercial bank	
February 13, 2009	Sherman County Bank, Loup City, Nebraska	Heritage Bank, Wood River, Nebraska	Commercial bank	
February 13, 2009	Riverside Bank of the Gulf Coast, Cape Coral, Florida	TIB Bank, Naples, Florida	Commercial bank	
February 13, 2009	Corn Belt Bank and Trust Company, Pittsfield, Illinois	The Carlinville National Bank, Carlinville, Illinois	Commercial bank	
February 13, 2009	Pinnacle Bank, Beaverton, Oregon	Washington Trust Bank, Spokane, Washington	Commercial bank	
February 20, 2009	Silver Falls Bank, Silverton, Oregon	Citizens Bank, Corvallis, Oregon	Commercial bank	
February 27, 2009	Heritage Community Bank, Glenwood, Illinois	MB Financial Bank, N.A., Chicago Illinois	Commercial bank	
February 27, 2009	Security Savings Bank, Henderson, Nevada	Bank of Nevada, Las Vegas, Nevada	Commercial bank	
March 6, 2009	Freedom Bank of Georgia, Commerce, Georgia	Northeast Georgia Bank, Lavonia, Georgia	Commercial bank	
March 20, 2009	FirstCity Bank, Stockbridge, Georgia	closed; FDIC payout of insured deposits	Commercial bank	
March 20, 2009	Colorado National Bank, Colorado Springs, Colorado	Herring Bank, Amarillo, Texas	Commercial bank	
March 20, 2009	TeamBank, Paola, Kansas	Great Southern Bank, Springfield, Missouri	Commercial bank	
March 27, 2009	Omni National Bank, Atlanta, Georgia	SunTrust Bank, Atlanta, Georgia	Commercial bank	
April 10, 2009	Cape Fear Bank, Wilmington, North Carolina	First Federal Savings and Loan Association of Charleston, Charleston, South Carolina	Savings and loan association	
April 10, 2009	New Frontier Bank, Greeley, Colorado	Deposit Insurance National Bank of Greeley (interim bank created by FDIC), Greeley, Colorado	Commercial bank	
April 17, 2009	American Sterling Bank, Sugar Creek, Missouri	Metcalf Bank, Lee's Summit, Missouri	Commercial bank	
April 17, 2009	Great Basin Bank of Nevada, Elko, Nevada	Nevada State Bank, Las Vegas, Nevada	Commercial bank	
April 24, 2009	American Southern Bank, Kennesaw, Georgia	Bank of North Georgia, Alpharetta, Georgia	Commercial bank	
April 24, 2009	Michigan Heritage Bank, Farmington Hills, Michigan	Level One Bank, Farmington Hills, Michigan	Commercial bank	
April 24, 2009	First Bank of Beverly Hills, Calabasas, California	closed; FDIC payout of insured deposits	Commercial bank	
April 24, 2009	First Bank of Idaho, FSB, Ketchum, Idaho	U.S. Bank, Minneapolis, Minnesota	Savings and loan association	
May 1, 2009	Silverton Bank, NA, Atlanta, Georgia	Silverton Bridge Bank, NA, Atlanta, Georgia	Correspondent bank	
May 1, 2009	Citizens Community Bank, Ridgewood, New Jersey	North Jersey Community Bank, Englewood Cliffs, New Jersey	Commercial bank	
May 1, 2009	America West Bank, Layton, Utah	Cache Valley Bank, Logan, Utah	Commercial bank	
May 8, 2009	Westsound Bank, Bremerton, Washington	Kitsap Bank, Port Orchard, Washington	Commercial bank	
May 21, 2009	BankUnited, FSB, Coral Gables, Florida	BankUnited, Coral Gables, Florida	Savings and loan association	
May 22, 2009	Strategic Capital Bank, Champaign, Illinois	Midland States Bank, Effingham, IL	Commercial bank	
May 22, 2009	Citizens National Bank, Macomb, Illinois	Morton Community Bank, Morton, Illinois	Commercial bank	
June 5, 2009	Bank of Lincolnwood, Lincolnwood, Illinois	Republic Bank of Chicago, Oak Brook, Illinois	Commercial bank	
June 19, 2009	Southern Community Bank, Fayetteville, Georgia	United Community Bank, Blairsville, Georgia	Commercial bank	
June 19, 2009	Cooperative Bank, Wilmington, North Carolina	First Bank, Troy, North Carolina	Commercial bank	
June 19, 2009	First National Bank of Anthory, Anthony, Kansas	Bank of Kansas, South Hutchinson, Kansas	Commercial bank	
June 26, 2009	Community Bank of West Georgia, Villa Rica, Georgia	closed; FDIC payout of insured deposits	Commercial bank	
June 26, 2009	Neighborhood Community Bank, Newnan, Georgia	Charter Bank, West Point, Georgia	Commercial bank	
June 26, 2009	Horizon Bank, Pine City, Minnesota	Stearns Bank, N.A., St. Cloud, Minnesota	Commercial bank	
June 26, 2009	Metro Pacific Bank, Irvine, California	Sunwest Bank, Tustin, California	Commercial bank	
June 26, 2009	Mirae Bank, Los Angeles, California	Wilshire State Bank, Los Angeles, California	Commercial bank	
July 2, 2009	John Warner Bank, Clinton, Illinois	State Bank of Lincoln, Lincoln, Illinois	Commercial bank	
July 2, 2009	First State Bank of Winchester, Winchester, Illinois	First Bank of Beardstown, Beardstown, Illinois	Commercial bank	
July 2, 2009	Rock River Bank, Oregon, Illinois	The Harvard State Bank, Harvard, Illinois	Commercial bank	
July 2, 2009	Elizabeth State Bank, Elizabeth, Illinois	Galena State Bank and Trust Company, Galena, Illinois	Commercial bank	
July 2, 2009	First National Bank of Danville, Danville, Illinois	First National Bank, NA, Terre Haute, Indiana	Commercial bank	
July 2, 2009	Millennium State Bank of Texas, Dallas, Texas	State Bank of Texas, Irving, Texas	Commercial bank	
July 2, 2009	Founders Bank, Worth, Illinois	The Private Bank and Trust Company, Chicago, Illinois	Commercial bank	
July 10, 2009	Bank of Wyoming, Thermopolis, Wyoming	Central Bank & Trust, Lander, Wyoming	Commercial bank	
July 17, 2009	First Piedmont Bank, Winder, Georgia	First American Bank and Trust Company, Athens, Georgia	Commercial bank	
July 17, 2009	Bank First, Sioux Falls, South Dakota	Alerus Financial N.A., Grand Forks, North Dakota	Commercial bank	
July 17, 2009	Vineyard Bank, Rancho Cucamonga, California	California Bank & Trust, San Diego, California	Commercial bank	
July 17, 2009	Temecula Valley Bank, Temecula, California	First-Citizens Bank and Trust Company, Raleigh, North Carolina	Commercial bank	
July 24, 2009	Waterford Village Bank, Williamsville, New York	Evans Bank, N.A., Angola, New York	Commercial bank	
July 24, 2009	Security Bank of Gwinnett County, Suwanee, Georgia	State Bank and Trust Company, Pinehurst, Georgia	Commercial bank	
July 24, 2009	Security Bank of North Fulton, Alpharetta, Georgia	State Bank and Trust Company, Pinehurst, Georgia	Commercial bank	
July 24, 2009	Security Bank of North Metro, Woodstock, Georgia	State Bank and Trust Company, Pinehurst, Georgia	Commercial bank	
July 24, 2009	Security Bank of Bibb County, Macon, Georgia	State Bank and Trust Company, Pinehurst, Georgia	Commercial bank	
July 24, 2009	Security Bank of Houston County, Perry, Georgia	State Bank and Trust Company, Pinehurst, Georgia	Commercial bank	
July 24, 2009	Security Bank of Jones County, Gray, Georgia	State Bank and Trust Company, Pinehurst, Georgia	Commercial bank	
July 31, 2009	First State Bank of Altus, Altus, Oklahoma	Herring Bank, Amarillo, Texas	Commercial bank	
July 31, 2009	Integrity Bank, Jupiter, Florida	Stonegate Bank, Fort Lauderdale, Florida	Commercial bank	
July 31, 2009	Peoples Community Bank, West Chester, Ohio	First Financial Bank, Hamilton, Ohio	Commercial bank	
July 31, 2009	First BankAmericano, Elizabeth, New Jersey	Crown Bank, Brick, New Jersey	Commercial bank	
July 31, 2009	Mutual Bank, Harvey, Illinois	United Central Bank, Garland, Texas	Commercial bank	
August 7, 2009	First State Bank, Sarasota, Florida	Stearns Bank N.A, St. Cloud, Minnesota	Commercial bank	
August 7, 2009	Community National Bank of Sarasota County, Venice, Florida	Stearns Bank N.A, St. Cloud, Minnesota	Commercial bank	
August 7, 2009	Community First Bank, Prineville, Oregon	Home Federal Bank, Nampa, Idaho	Commercial bank	
August 14, 2009	Dwelling House Savings and Loan Association, Pittsburgh, Pennsylvania	PNC Bank N.A, Pittsburgh, Pennsylvania	Commercial bank	
August 14, 2009	Colonial Bank, Montgomery, Alabama	Branch Banking and Trust Company, Winston-Salem, North Carolina	Commercial bank	
August 14, 2009	Community Bank of Nevada, Las Vegas, Nevada	Deposit Insurance National Bank of Las Vegas, Las Vegas, Nevada	Commercial bank	
August 14, 2009	Community Bank of Arizona, Phoenix, Arizona	MidFirst Bank, Oklahoma City, Oklahoma	Commercial bank	
August 14, 2009	Union Bank N.A., Gilbert, Arizona	MidFirst Bank, Oklahoma City, Oklahoma	Commercial bank	
August 21, 2009	eBank, Atlanta, Georgia	Stearns Bank, NA, St. Cloud, Minnesota	Commercial bank	
August 21, 2009	First Coweta Bank, Newnan, Georgia	United Bank, Zebulon, Georgia	Commercial bank	
August 21, 2009	CapitalSouth Bank, Birmingham, Alabama	IberiaBank, Lafayette, Louisiana	Commercial bank	
August 21, 2009	Guaranty Bank, Austin, Texas	BBVA Compass, Birmingham, Alabama	Commercial bank	
August 28, 2009	Bradford Bank, Baltimore, Maryland	Manufacturers and Traders Trust Company, Buffalo, New York	Commercial bank	
August 28, 2009	Mainstreet Bank, Forest Lake, Minnesota	Central Bank, Stillwater, Minnesota	Commercial bank	
August 28, 2009	Affinity Bank, Ventura, California	Pacific Western Bank, San Diego, California	Commercial bank	
August 28, 2009	Vantus Bank, Sioux City, Iowa	Great Southern Bank, Springfield, Missouri	Commercial bank	
September 4, 2009	First Bank of Kansas City, Kansas City, Missouri	Great American Bank, DeSoto, Kansas	Commercial bank	
September 4, 2009	InBank, Oak Forest, Illinois	MB Financial Bank NA, Chicago, Illinois	Commercial bank	
September 4, 2009	Platinum Community Bank, Rolling Meadows, Illinois	closed; FDIC payout of insured deposits	Commercial bank	
September 4, 2009	First State Bank, Flagstaff, Arizona	Sunwest Bank, Tustin, California	Commercial bank	
September 11, 2009	Corus Bank, N.A., Chicago, Illinois	MB Financial Bank, N.A., Chicago, Illinois	Commercial bank	
September 11, 2009	Brickwell Community Bank, Woodbury, Minnesota	CorTrust Bank, N.A., Mitchell, South Dakota	Commercial bank	
September 11, 2009	Venture Bank, Lacey, Washington	First-Citizens Bank and Trust Company, Raleigh, North Carolina	Commercial bank	
September 18, 2009	Irwin Union Bank and Trust Company, Columbus, Indiana	First Financial Bank, N.A., Hamilton, Ohio	Commercial bank	
September 18, 2009	Irwin Union Bank, F.S.B., Louisville, Kentucky	First Financial Bank, N.A., Hamilton, Ohio	Savings and loan association	
September 25, 2009	Georgian Bank, Atlanta, Georgia	First Citizens Bank and Trust Company, Columbia, South Carolina	Commercial bank	
October 2, 2009	Warren Bank, Warren, Michigan	Huntington National Bank, Columbus, Ohio	Commercial bank	
October 2, 2009	Colorado National Bank, Pueblo, Colorado	Legacy Bank, Wiley, Colorado	Commercial bank	
October 2, 2009	State Bank, Spring Grove, Minnesota	Central Bank, Stillwater, Minnesota	Commercial bank	
October 16, 2009	San Joaquin Bank, Bakersfield, California	Citizens Business Bank, Ontario, California	Commercial bank	
October 23, 2009	Partners Bank, Naples, Florida	Stonegate Bank, Fort Lauderdale, Florida	Commercial bank	
October 23, 2009	American United Bank, Lawrenceville, Georgia	Ameris Bank, Moultrie, Georgia	Commercial bank	
October 23, 2009	Hillcrest Bank Florida, Naples, Florida	Stonegate Bank, Fort Lauderdale, Florida	Commercial bank	
October 23, 2009	Flagship National Bank, Bradenton, Florida	First Federal Bank of Florida, Lake City, Florida	Commercial bank	
October 23, 2009	Bank of Elmwood, Racine, Wisconsin	Tri City National Bank, Oak Creek, Wisconsin	Commercial bank	
October 23, 2009	Riverview Community Bank, Otsego, Minnesota	Central Bank, Stillwater, Minnesota	Commercial bank	
October 23, 2009	First DuPage Bank, Westmont, Illinois	First Midwest Bank, Itasca, Illinois	Commercial bank	
October 23, 2009	Bank USA, NA, Phoenix, Arizona	U.S. Bank, NA, of Minneapolis, Minnesota	Commercial bank	
October 23, 2009	California National Bank, Los Angeles, California	U.S. Bank, NA, of Minneapolis, Minnesota	Commercial bank	
October 23, 2009	San Diego National Bank, San Diego, California	U.S. Bank, NA, of Minneapolis, Minnesota	Commercial bank	
October 23, 2009	Pacific National Bank, San Francisco, California	U.S. Bank, NA, of Minneapolis, Minnesota	Commercial bank	
October 23, 2009	Park National Bank, Chicago, Illinois	U.S. Bank, NA, of Minneapolis, Minnesota	Commercial bank	
October 23, 2009	Community Bank of Lemont, Lemont, Illinois	U.S. Bank, NA, of Minneapolis, Minnesota	Commercial bank	
October 23, 2009	North Houston Bank, Houston, Texas	U.S. Bank, NA, of Minneapolis, Minnesota	Commercial bank	
October 23, 2009	Madisonville State Bank, Madisonville, Texas	U.S. Bank, NA, of Minneapolis, Minnesota	Commercial bank	
October 23, 2009	Citizens National Bank, Teague, Texas	U.S. Bank, NA, of Minneapolis, Minnesota	Commercial bank	
October 23, 2009	California National Bank, Los Angeles, California	U.S. Bank, NA, of Minneapolis, Minnesota	Commercial bank	
November 6, 2009	United Security Bank, Sparta, Georgia	Ameris Bank, Moultrie, Georgia	Commercial bank	
November 6, 2009	Home Federal Savings Bank, Detroit, Michigan	Liberty Bank and Trust Company, New Orleans, Louisiana	Commercial bank	
November 6, 2009	Prosperan Bank, Oakdale, Minnesota	Alerus Financial, NA, Grand Forks, North Dakota	Commercial bank	
November 6, 2009	Gateway Bank of St. Louis, St. Louis, Missouri	Central Bank of Kansas City, Kansas City, Missouri	Commercial bank	
November 6, 2009	United Commercial Bank, San Francisco, California	East West Bank, Pasadena, California	Commercial bank	
November 13, 2009	Century Bank, Federal Savings Bank, Sarasota, Florida	IberiaBank, Lafayette, Louisiana	Savings and loan association	
November 13, 2009	Orion Bank, Naples, Florida	IberiaBank, Lafayette, Louisiana	Commercial bank	
November 13, 2009	Pacific Coast National Bank, San Clemente, California	Sunwest Bank, Tustin, California	Commercial bank	
November 20, 2009	Commerce Bank of Southwest Florida, Fort Myers, Florida	Central Bank, Stillwater, Minnesota	Commercial bank	
November 20, 2009	Commerce Bank of Southwest Florida, Fort Myers, Florida	Central Bank, Stillwater, Minnesota	Commercial bank	
December 4, 2009	Buckhead Community Bank, Atlanta, Georgia	State Bank and Trust Company, Macon, Georgia	Commercial bank	
December 4, 2009	First Security National Bank, Norcross, Georgia	State Bank and Trust Company, Macon, Georgia	Commercial bank	
December 4, 2009	Tattnall Bank, Reidsville, Georgia	HeritageBank of the South, Albany, Georgia	Commercial bank	
December 4, 2009	AmTrust Bank, Cleveland, Ohio	New York Community Bank, Westbury, New York	Savings and loan association	
December 4, 2009	Benchmark Bank, Aurora, Illinois	MB Financial Bank, National Association, Chicago, Illinois	Commercial bank	
December 4, 2009	Greater Atlantic Bank, Reston, Virginia	Sonabank, McLean Virginia	Savings and loan association	
December 11, 2009	Republic Federal Bank, National Association, Miami, Florida	1st United Bank, Boca Raton, Florida	Commercial bank	
December 11, 2009	Valley Capital Bank, National Association, Mesa, Arizona	Enterprise Bank & Trust, Clayton, Missouri	Commercial bank	
December 11, 2009	SolutionsBank, Overland Park, Kansas	Arvest Bank, Fayetteville, Arkansas	Commercial bank	
December 18, 2009	RockBridge Commercial Bank, Atlanta, Georgia	FDIC (no acquiring bank)	Commercial bank	
December 11, 2009	Peoples First Community Bank, Panama City, Florida	Hancock Bank, Gulfport, Mississippi	Savings and loan association	
December 18, 2009	Citizens State Bank, New Baltimore, Michigan	FDIC-created Deposit Insurance National Bank of New Baltimore (no acquiring bank)	Commercial bank	
December 11, 2009	New South Federal Savings Bank, Irondale, Alabama	Beal Bank, Plano, Texas	Savings and loan association	
December 11, 2009	Independent Bankers' Bank, Springfield, Illinois	FDIC-created Independent Bankers' Bank Bridge Bank	Correspondent bank	
December 18, 2009	Imperial Capital Bank, La Jolla, California	City National Bank, Los Angeles, California	Commercial bank	
December 18, 2009	First Federal Bank of California, Santa Monica, California	OneWest Bank, FSB, Pasadena	Savings and loan association	

=== 2010 (157 total) ===
The following 157 banks failed in 2010:

	Bank	City	State	Date	Acquired by	Assets ($mil.)
1	Horizon Bank	Bellingham	Washington	January 8, 2010	Washington Federal Savings and Loan Association	1,300
2	Town Community Bank & Trust	Antioch	Illinois	January 15, 2010	First American Bank	70
3	St. Stephen State Bank	St. Stephen	Minnesota	January 15, 2010	First State Bank of St. Joseph	25
4	Barnes Banking Company	Kaysville	Utah	January 15, 2010	None (insured depositors paid directly)	828
5	Premier American Bank	Miami	Florida	January 22, 2010	Premier American Bank, N.A.	351
6	Bank of Leeton	Leeton	Missouri	January 22, 2010	Sunflower Bank, N.A.	20
7	Charter Bank	Santa Fe	New Mexico	January 22, 2010	Charter Bank	1,200
8	Evergreen Bank	Seattle	Washington	January 22, 2010	Umpqua Bank	489
9	Columbia River Bank	The Dalles	Oregon	January 22, 2010	Columbia State Bank	1,100
10	First National Bank of Georgia	Carrollton	Georgia	January 29, 2010	Community and Southern Bank	833
11	Florida Community Bank	Immokalee	Florida	January 29, 2010	Premier American Bank, N.A.	876
12	Marshall Bank, N.A.	Hallock	Minnesota	January 29, 2010	United Valley Bank	60
13	Community Bank and Trust	Cornelia	Georgia	January 29, 2010	SCBT, NA	1,210
14	First Regional Bank	Los Angeles	California	January 29, 2010	First-Citizens Bank and Trust Company	2,180
15	American Marine Bank	Bainbridge Island	Washington	January 29, 2010	Columbia State Bank	373
16	1st American State Bank of Minnesota	Hancock	Minnesota	February 5, 2010	Community Development Bank, FSB	18
17	La Jolla Bank	La Jolla	California	February 19, 2010	OneWest Bank, FSB	3,600
18	George Washington Savings Bank	Orland Park	Illinois	February 19, 2010	FirstMerit Bank, N.A.	413
19	The La Coste National Bank	La Coste	Texas	February 19, 2010	Community National Bank	54
20	Marco Community Bank	Marco Island	Florida	February 19, 2010	Mutual of Omaha Bank	120
21	Carson River Community Bank	Carson City	Nevada	February 26, 2010	Heritage Bank of Nevada	51
22	Rainier Pacific Bank	Tacoma	Washington	February 26, 2010	Umpqua Bank	718
23	Centennial Bank	Ogden	Utah	March 5, 2010	None (insured depositors paid directly)	215
24	Waterfield Bank	Germantown	Maryland	March 5, 2010	None (insured depositors paid from a new bank or directly)	156
25	Bank of Illinois	Normal	Illinois	March 5, 2010	Heartland Bank and Trust Company	212
26	Sun American Bank	Boca Raton	Florida	March 5, 2010	First-Citizens Bank and Trust Company	536
27	LibertyPointe Bank	New York	New York	March 12, 2010	Valley National Bank	210
28	The Park Avenue Bank	New York	New York	March 12, 2010	Valley National Bank	520
29	Statewide Bank	Covington	Louisiana	March 12, 2010	Home Bank	243
30	Old Southern Bank	Orlando	Florida	March 12, 2010	Centennial Bank	316
31	American National Bank	Parma	Ohio	March 19, 2010	The National Bank and Trust Company	70
32	Advanta Bank Corp	Draper	Utah	March 19, 2010	None (insured depositors paid directly)	1,600
33	Century Security Bank	Duluth	Georgia	March 19, 2010	Bank of Upson	97
34	Bank of Hiawassee	Hiawassee	Georgia	March 19, 2010	Citizens South Bank	378
35	Appalachian Community Bank	Ellijay	Georgia	March 19, 2010	Community and Southern Bank	1,010
36	First Lowndes Bank	Luverne	Alabama	March 19, 2010	First Citizens Bank	137
37	State Bank of Aurora	Aurora	Minnesota	March 19, 2010	Northern State Bank	28
38	Desert Hills Bank	Phoenix	Arizona	March 26, 2010	New York Community Bank	497
39	Unity National Bank	Cartersville	Georgia	March 26, 2010	Bank of the Ozarks	292
40	Key West Bank	Key West	Florida	March 26, 2010	Centennial Bank	88
41	McIntosh Commercial Bank	Carrollton	Georgia	March 26, 2010	Hamilton State Bank	363
42	Beach First National Bank	Myrtle Beach	South Carolina	April 9, 2010	Bank of North Carolina	585
43	City Bank	Lynnwood	Washington	April 16, 2010	Whidbey Island Bank	1,130
44	Tamalpais Bank	San Rafael	California	April 16, 2010	Union Bank, N.A.	629
45	Innovative Bank	Oakland	California	April 16, 2010	Center Bank	269
46	Butler Bank	Lowell	Massachusetts	April 16, 2010	People's United Bank	268
47	Riverside National Bank of Florida	Fort Pierce	Florida	April 16, 2010	TD Bank, N.A.	3,420
48	AmericanFirst Bank	Clermont	Florida	April 16, 2010	TD Bank, N.A.	91
49	First Federal Bank of North Florida	Palatka	Florida	April 16, 2010	TD Bank, N.A.	393
50	Lakeside Community Bank	Sterling Heights	Michigan	April 16, 2010	None (insured depositors paid directly)	53
51	Amcore Bank	Rockford	Illinois	April 23, 2010	Harris, N.A.	3,400
52	Broadway Bank	Chicago	Illinois	April 23, 2010	MB Financial, N.A.	1,200
53	Citizens Bank and Trust Company of Chicago	Chicago	Illinois	April 23, 2010	Republic Bank of Chicago	77
54	Lincoln Park Saving Bank	Chicago	Illinois	April 23, 2010	Northbrook Bank and Trust Company	200
55	New Century Bank	Chicago	Illinois	April 23, 2010	MB Financial, N.A.	486
56	Peotone Bank and Trust Company	Peotone	Illinois	April 23, 2010	First Midwest Bank	130
57	Wheatland Bank	Naperville	Illinois	April 23, 2010	Wheaton Bank and Trust	437
58	BC National Banks	Butler	Missouri	April 30, 2010	Community First Bank	67
59	CF Bancorp	Port Huron	Michigan	April 30, 2010	First Michigan Bank	1,650
60	Champion Bank	Creve Coeur	Missouri	April 30, 2010	BankLiberty	187
61	Eurobank	San Juan	Puerto Rico	April 30, 2010	Orient Bank and Trust	2,560
62	Frontier Bank	Everett	Washington	April 30, 2010	Union Bank	3,500
63	R-G Premier Bank of Puerto Rico	Hato Rey	Puerto Rico	April 30, 2010	Scotiabank de Puerto Rico	5,920
64	Westernbank Puerto Rico	Mayaguez	Puerto Rico	April 30, 2010	Banco Popular de Puerto Rico	11,940
65	1st Pacific Bank of California	San Diego	California	May 7, 2010	City National Bank	336
66	Towne Bank of Arizona	Mesa	Arizona	May 7, 2010	Commerce Bank of Arizona	120
67	Access Bank	Champlin	Minnesota	May 7, 2010	PrinsBank	32
68	The Bank of Bonifay	Bonifay	Florida	May 7, 2010	First Federal Bank of Florida	243
69	Midwest Bank and Trust Company	Elmwood Park	Illinois	May 14, 2010	FirstMerit Bank, N.A.	3,170
70	New Liberty Bank	Plymouth	Michigan	May 14, 2010	Bank of Ann Arbor	109
71	Satilla Community Bank	St. Marys	Georgia	May 14, 2010	Ameris Bank	136
72	Southwest Community Bank	Springfield	Missouri	May 14, 2010	Simmons First National Bank	97
73	Pinehurst Bank	St. Paul	Minnesota	May 21, 2010	Coulee Bank	61
74	Bank of Florida-Southeast	Fort Lauderdale	Florida	May 28, 2010	EverBank	595
75	Bank of Florida-Southwest	Naples	Florida	May 28, 2010	EverBank	641
76	Bank of Florida-Tampa Bay	Tampa	Florida	May 28, 2010	EverBank	245
77	Sun West Bank	Las Vegas	Nevada	May 28, 2010	City National Bank	361
78	Granite Community Bank	Granite Bay	California	May 28, 2010	Tri Counties Bank	103
79	TierOne Bank	Lincoln	Nebraska	June 4, 2010	Great Western Bank	2,800
80	First National Bank	Rosedale	Mississippi	June 4, 2010	The Jefferson Bank	60
81	Arcola Homestead Savings Bank	Arcola	Illinois	June 4, 2010	None (insured depositors paid directly)	17
82	Washington First International Bank	Seattle	Washington	June 11, 2010	East West Bank	521
83	Nevada Security Bank	Reno	Nevada	June 18, 2010	Umpqua Bank	480
84	Peninsula Bank	Englewood	Florida	June 25, 2010	Premier American Bank, N.A.	644
85	First National Bank	Savannah	Georgia	June 25, 2010	The Savannah Bank	253
86	High Desert State Bank	Albuquerque	New Mexico	June 25, 2010	First American Bank	81
87	Bay National Bank	Baltimore	Maryland	July 9, 2010	Bay Bank, FSB	282
88	Ideal Federal Savings Bank	Baltimore	Maryland	July 9, 2010	None (insured depositors paid directly)	6
89	USA Bank	Port Chester	New York	July 9, 2010	New Century Bank	190
90	Home National Bank	Blackwell	Oklahoma	July 9, 2010	RCB Bank	561
91	Woodlands Bank	Bluffton	South Carolina	July 16, 2010	Bank of the Ozarks	376
92	First National Bank of the South	Spartanburg	South Carolina	July 16, 2010	NAFH National Bank	682
93	Mainstreet Savings Bank	Hastings	Michigan	July 16, 2010	Commercial Bank	97
94	Metro Bank of Dade County	Miami	Florida	July 16, 2010	NAFH National Bank	442
95	Turnberry Bank	Aventura	Florida	July 16, 2010	NAFH National Bank	264
96	Olde Cypress Community Bank	Clewiston	Florida	July 16, 2010	CenterState Bank of Florida	169
97	Community Security Bank	New Prague	Minnesota	July 23, 2010	Roundbank	108
98	Crescent Bank and Trust Co	Jasper	Georgia	July 23, 2010	Renasant Bank	1,000
99	Sterling Bank	Lantana	Florida	July 23, 2010	IBERIABANK	408
100	Williamsburg First National Bank	Kingstree	South Carolina	July 23, 2010	First Citizens Bank and Trust Company	139
101	Thunder Bank	Sylvan Grove	Kansas	July 23, 2010	The Bennington State Bank	33
102	SouthwestUSA Bank	Las Vegas	Nevada	July 23, 2010	Plaza Bank	214
103	Home Valley Bank	Cave Junction	Oregon	July 23, 2010	South Valley Bank and Trust	252
104	Bayside Savings Bank	Port Saint Joe	Florida	July 30, 2010	Centennial Bank	66
105	Coastal Community Bank	Panama City	Florida	July 30, 2010	Centennial Bank	373
106	NorthWest Bank and Trust	Acworth	Georgia	July 30, 2010	State Bank and Trust Company	168
107	The Cowlitz Bank	Longview	Washington	July 30, 2010	Heritage Bank	529
108	LibertyBank	Eugene	Oregon	July 30, 2010	Home Federal Bank	768
109	Ravenswood Bank	Chicago	Illinois	August 6, 2010	Northbrook Bank and Trust Company	265
110	Palos Bank and Trust	Palos Heights	Illinois	August 13, 2010	First Midwest Bank	493
111	ShoreBank	Chicago	Illinois	August 20, 2010	Urban Partnership Bank	2,160
112	Community National Bank at Bartow	Bartow	Florida	August 20, 2010	CenterState Bank of Florida	68
113	Independent National Bank	Ocala	Florida	August 20, 2010	CenterState Bank of Florida	156
114	Imperial Savings & Loan	Martinsville	Virginia	August 20, 2010	River Community Bank, N.A.	9
115	Butte Community Bank	Chico	California	August 20, 2010	Rabobank, N.A.	499
116	Pacific State Bank	Stockton	California	August 20, 2010	Rabobank, N.A.	312
117	Los Padres Bank	Solvang	California	August 20, 2010	Pacific Western Bank	870
118	Sonoma Valley Bank	Sonoma	California	August 20, 2010	Westamerica Bank	337
119	Horizon Bank	Bradenton	Florida	September 10, 2010	Bank of the Ozarks	188
120	Bank of Ellijay	Ellijay	Georgia	September 17, 2010	Community and Southern Bank	169
121	First Commerce Community Bank	Douglasville	Georgia	September 17, 2010	Community and Southern Bank	248
122	Peoples Bank	Winder	Georgia	September 17, 2010	Community and Southern Bank	447
123	ISN Bank	Cherry Hill	New Jersey	September 17, 2010	Customers Bank	82
124	Bramble Savings Bank	Milford	Ohio	September 17, 2010	Foundation Bank	48
125	Maritime Savings Bank	West Allis	Wisconsin	September 17, 2010	North Shore Bank, FSB	351
126	Haven Trust Bank Florida	Ponte Vedra Beach	Florida	September 24, 2010	First Southern Bank	149
127	North County Bank	Arlington	Washington	September 24, 2010	Whidbey Island Bank	289
128	Wakulla Bank	Crawfordville	Florida	October 1, 2010	Centennial Bank	424
129	Shoreline Bank	Shoreline	Washington	October 1, 2010	GBC International Bank	104
130	Security Savings Bank, FSB	Olathe	Kansas	October 15, 2010	Simmons First National Bank	508
131	WestBridge Bank and Trust Company	Chesterfield	Missouri	October 15, 2010	Midland State Bank	92
132	Premier Bank	Jefferson City	Missouri	October 15, 2010	Providence Bank	1,200
133	Hillcrest Bank	Overland Park	Kansas	October 22, 2010	Hillcrest Bank, N.A.	1,600
134	First Bank of Jacksonville	Jacksonville	Florida	October 22, 2010	Ameris Bank	81
135	Progress Bank of Florida	Tampa	Florida	October 22, 2010	Bay Cities Bank	111
136	First National Bank of Barnesville	Barnesville	Georgia	October 22, 2010	United Bank	131
137	Gordon Bank	Gordon	Georgia	October 22, 2010	Morris Bank	29
138	First Suburban National Bank	Maywood	Illinois	October 22, 2010	Seaway Bank and Trust Company	149
139	First Arizona Savings	Scottsdale	Arizona	October 22, 2010	None (insured depositors paid directly)	272
140	K Bank	Randallstown	Maryland	November 5, 2010	Manufacturers and Traders Trust Company	538
141	Western Commercial Bank	Woodland Hills	California	November 5, 2010	First California Bank	99
142	First Vietnamese American Bank	Westminster	California	November 5, 2010	Grandpoint Bank	48
143	Pierce Commercial Bank	Tacoma	Washington	November 5, 2010	Heritage Bank	221
144	Tifton Banking Company	Tifton	Georgia	November 12, 2010	Ameris Bank	144
145	Darby Bank & Trust	Vidalia	Georgia	November 12, 2010	Ameris Bank	655
146	Copper Star Bank	Scottsdale	Arizona	November 12, 2010	Stearns Bank, N.A.	204
147	Gulf State Community Bank	Carrabelle	Florida	November 19, 2010	Centennial Bank	112
148	Allegiance Bank of North America	Bala Cynwyd	Pennsylvania	November 19, 2010	VIST Bank	106
149	First Banking Center	Burlington	Wisconsin	November 19, 2010	First Michigan Bank	821
150	Paramount Bank	Farmington Hills	Michigan	December 10, 2010	Level One Bank	253
151	Earthstar Bank	Southampton	Pennsylvania	December 10, 2010	Polonia Bank	113
152	Chestatee State Bank	Dawsonville	Georgia	December 17, 2010	Bank of the Ozarks	244
153	First Southern Bank	Batesville	Arkansas	December 17, 2010	Southern Bank	156
154	Community National Bank	Lino Lakes	Minnesota	December 17, 2010	Farmers & Merchants Savings Bank	29
155	United Americas Bank	Atlanta	Georgia	December 17, 2010	State Bank and Trust Company	194
156	Appalachian Community Bank	McCaysville	Georgia	December 17, 2010	Peoples Bank of East Tennessee	68
157	The Bank of Miami, N.A.	Coral Gables	Florida	December 17, 2010	1st United Bank	448

== Credit unions ==
The National Credit Union Administration (NCUA) does not have a table of failed credit unions prior to 2009. A list of credit unions which failed since 2009 can be found at https://ncua.gov/support-services/conservatorships-liquidations . For failed credit unions prior to 2009 please refer to press releases regarding failed credit unions at https://ncua.gov/news/press-releases.

Date	Company	Deposits and/or branches taken by	Type of company bankrupt or closed	Ref.
April 27, 2007	Sharebuilders Federal Credit Union, Northridge, California	closed and liquidated by NCUA	credit union	
November 2, 2007	Green Tree Credit Union, Feasterville, Pennsylvania	closed and liquidated by NCUA; a portion of the assets were transferred to Freedom Credit Union, Warminster, Pennsylvania	credit union	
November 28, 2007	Huron River Credit Union, Ann Arbor, Michigan	Detroit Edison Credit Union, Detroit, Michigan	credit union	
January 24, 2008	Norlarco Federal Credit Union, Ft. Collins, Colorado	Public Service Credit Union, Denver, Colorado	credit union	
May 3, 2008	St. Luke Baptist Federal Credit Union, Laurelton, New York	closed and liquidated by NCUA	credit union	
May 12, 2008	Father Burke Federal Credit Union, Bronx, New York	closed and liquidated by NCUA	credit union	
July 1, 2008	Cal State 9 Credit Union, Concord, California	closed and liquidated by NCUA; most assets assumed by Patelco Credit Union, San Francisco, California	credit union	
July 1, 2008	Sterlent Credit Union, Pleasanton, California	closed and liquidated by NCUA; most assets assumed by Patelco Credit Union, San Francisco, California	credit union	
July 16, 2008	Meridan F.A. Federal Credit Union, Meriden, Connecticut	closed and liquidated by NCUA	credit union	
July 28, 2008	New London Security Federal Credit Union, New London, Connecticut	closed and liquidated by NCUA	credit union	
August 8, 2008	Port Trust Federal Credit Union, Charleston, South Carolina	CPM Federal Credit Union, North Charleston, South Carolina	credit union	
September 17, 2008	Interfaith Federal Credit Union, East Orange, New Jersey	closed and liquidated by NCUA	credit union	
September 29, 2008	Kaiperm Federal Credit Union, Oakland, California	Alliant Credit Union, Chicago, Illinois	credit union	
October 3, 2008	TEXDOT-WF Credit Union, Wichita Falls, Texas	Postal Family Credit Union, Wichita Falls, Texas	credit union	
October 6, 2008	N&W Poca Division Federal Credit Union, Bluefield, West Virginia	closed and liquidated by NCUA	credit union	
December 5, 2008	West Hartford Credit Union, Farmington, Connecticut	closed and liquidated by NCUA	credit union	
January 2, 2009	Valley Credit Union, San Jose, California	closed and placed into receivership by NCUA; assets assumed by Citizens Equity First Credit Union (CEFCU), Peoria, Illinois	credit union	
February 13, 2009	Center Valley Credit Union, Wheeling, West Virginia	closed and liquidated by NCUA	credit union	
March 20, 2009	U.S. Central Credit Union, Lenexa, Kansas	Placed into conservatorship under the NCUA. This corporate credit union will continue to run under NCUA management.	Corporate credit union	
March 20, 2009	Western Corporate (WesCorp) Federal Credit Union, San Dimas, California	Placed into conservatorship under the NCUA. This corporate credit union will continue to run under NCUA management.	Corporate credit union	
April 24, 2009	Eastern Financial Florida Credit Union, Miramar, Florida	Placed into conservatorship under the NCUA. Officials from Space Coast Credit Union of Melbourne, Florida will temporarily manage day-to-day operations.	credit union	
July 6, 2009	Watts United Credit Union, Los Angeles, California	closed and liquidated by NCUA	credit union	
August 12, 2009	Community One Federal Credit Union, Clark County, Nevada	closed by NCUA; assets assumed by America First Federal Credit Union P&A, Riverside, Utah	credit union	
August 28, 2009	Free Choice Federal Credit Union, Feasterville, Pennsylvania	closed by NCUA; assets assumed by Trumark Financial Credit Union, Trevose, Pennsylvania	credit union	
September 22, 2009	Comunidades Federal Union, Los Angeles, California	closed by NCUA; assets assumed by Water and Power Community Credit Union, Los Angeles, California	credit union	
September 24, 2009	Keys Federal Credit Union Key West, Florida	placed into conservatorship by NCUA	credit union	
September 25, 2009	Clearstar Financial Credit Union (Reno, Nevada)	closed and liquidated by NCUA	credit union	
September 30, 2009	The Members' Own Federal Credit Union (Victorville, California)	closed and liquidated by NCUA	credit union	
September 30, 2009	West Texas Credit Union (El Paso, Texas)	closed and liquidated by NCUA	credit union	
October 23, 2009	First Delta Federal Credit Union (Marks, Mississippi)	placed into conservatorship by NCUA	credit union	
October 28, 2009	Second Baptist Church Credit Union (Los Angeles, California)	closed and liquidated by NCUA	credit union	
November 13, 2009	Ensign Federal Credit Union (Henderson, Nevada)	closed and liquidated by NCUA	credit union	
November 30, 2009	Fairfield County Ohio Federal Employees Federal Credit Union (Lancaster, Ohio)	closed and liquidated by NCUA	credit union	
December 17, 2009	First Service Credit Union (Milwaukee, Wisconsin)	Merger With NCUA Assistance	credit union	
December 31, 2009	GCM Federal Credit Union (St. Paul, Minnesota)	Merger With NCUA Assistance	credit union	
December 31, 2009	HeritageWest Federal Credit Union (Tooele, Utah)	closed and liquidated by NCUA	credit union	
December 31, 2009	Allied Tube Employees Federal Credit Union (Harvey, Illinois)	closed and liquidated by NCUA	credit union	

== See also ==
- List of bank failures in the United States (2008–present)
- List of banks acquired or bankrupted during the Great Recession
- National City acquisition by PNC
- 2023 United States banking crisis

General:

- Too big to fail
- List of largest bank failures in the United States
