= List of bank failures in the United States (2008–present) =

On average, between 1980 and 1994, a US bank failed every three days. The pace of bankruptcies peaked immediately after the 2008 financial crisis. The 2008 financial crisis led to many bank failures in the United States. The Federal Deposit Insurance Corporation (FDIC) closed 465 failed banks from 2008 to 2012. In contrast, in the five years prior to 2008, only 10 banks failed. At the end of 2022, the US banking industry had a total of about $620 billion in unrealized losses as a result of investments weakened by rising interest rates.

A bank failure is the closing of a bank by a federal or state banking regulatory agency. The FDIC is named as receiver for a bank's assets when its capital levels are too low, or it cannot meet obligations the next day. After a bank's assets are placed into receivership, the FDIC acts in two capacities—first, it pays insurance to the depositors, up to the deposit insurance limit, for assets not sold to another bank. Second, as the receiver of the failed bank, it assumes the task of selling and collecting the assets of the failed bank and settling its debts, including claims for deposits in excess of the insured limit. The FDIC insures up to $250,000 per depositor, per insured bank, as a result of the Emergency Economic Stabilization Act of 2008, which raised the limit from $100,000.

The receivership of Washington Mutual Bank by federal regulators on September 26, 2008, was the largest bank failure in U.S. history. Regulators simultaneously brokered the sale of most of the banks's assets to JPMorgan Chase, which planned to write down the value of Washington Mutual's loans at least $31 billion.

== 2008 ==
Twenty-five (twenty-six including the Utah-based wholly owned subsidiary of Washington Mutual, which was covered under the same FDIC closure notice as its parent company) banks failed in 2008

| | Bank | City | State | Date | Acquired by | Assets ($mil.) |
|---|---|---|---|---|---|---|
| 1 | Douglass National Bank | Kansas City | Missouri | January 25, 2008 | Liberty Bank and Trust | 58.5 |
| 2 | Hume Bank | Hume | Missouri | March 7, 2008 | Security Bank | 18.7 |
| 3 | Bear Stearns | New York City | New York | March 16, 2008 | J.P. Morgan Chase | 395,000 |
| 4 | ANB Financial N.A. | Bentonville | Arkansas | May 9, 2008 | Pulaski Bank and Trust Company | 2,100 |
| 5 | First Integrity Bank, N.A. | Staples | Minnesota | May 30, 2008 | First International Bank and Trust | 54.7 |
| 6 | IndyMac | Pasadena | California | July 11, 2008 | OneWest Bank, FSB | 32,000 |
| 7 | First National Bank of Nevada | Reno | Nevada | July 25, 2008 | Mutual of Omaha Bank | 3,400 |
| 8 | First Heritage Bank, N.A. | Newport Beach | California | July 25, 2008 | Mutual of Omaha Bank | 254 |
| 9 | First Priority Bank | Bradenton | Florida | August 1, 2008 | SunTrust Banks | 259 |
| 10 | The Columbian Bank and Trust Company | Topeka | Kansas | August 22, 2008 | Citizens Bank and Trust | 752 |
| 11 | Integrity Bank | Alpharetta | Georgia | August 29, 2008 | Regions Bank | 1,100 |
| 12 | Silver State Bank | Henderson | Nevada | September 5, 2008 | Nevada State Bank | 2,000 |
| 13 | Ameribank | Northfork | West Virginia | September 19, 2008 | The Citizens Savings Bank; Pioneer Community Bank | 113 |
| 14 | Washington Mutual Bank | Seattle | Washington | September 25, 2008 | JPMorgan Chase & Co | 307,000 |
| 15 | Main Street Bank | Northville | Michigan | October 10, 2008 | Monroe Bank and Trust | 98 |
| 16 | Meridian Bank | Eldred | Illinois | October 10, 2008 | National Bank | 39.2 |
| 17 | Alpha Bank & Trust | Alpharetta | Georgia | October 24, 2008 | Stearns Bank, N.A. | 354.1 |
| 18 | Freedom Bank | Bradenton | Florida | October 31, 2008 | Fifth Third Bank | 287 |
| 19 | Franklin Bank | Houston | Texas | November 7, 2008 | Prosperity Bank | 5,100 |
| 20 | Security Pacific Bank | Los Angeles | California | November 7, 2008 | Pacific Western Bank | 561.1 |
| 21 | The Community Bank | Loganville | Georgia | November 21, 2008 | Bank of Essex | 681.0 |
| 22 | Downey Savings and Loan | Newport Beach | California | November 21, 2008 | U.S. Bank, N.A. | 12,800 |
| 23 | PFF Bank and Trust | Pomona | California | November 21, 2008 | U.S. Bank, N.A. | 3,700 |
| 24 | First Georgia Community Bank | Jackson | Georgia | December 5, 2008 | United Bank | 237.5 |
| 25 | Haven Trust Bank | Duluth | Georgia | December 12, 2008 | Branch Banking and Trust Company (BB&T) | 572 |
| 26 | Sanderson State Bank | Sanderson | Texas | December 12, 2008 | The Pecos County State Bank | 37 |

== 2009 ==
One hundred forty banks failed in 2009

| | Bank | City | State | Date | Acquired by | Assets ($mil.) |
|---|---|---|---|---|---|---|
| 1 | National Bank of Commerce | Berkeley | Illinois | January 16, 2009 | Republic Bank of Chicago | 430.9 |
| 2 | Bank of Clark County | Vancouver | Washington | January 16, 2009 | Umpqua Bank | 446.5 |
| 3 | 1st Centennial Bank | Redlands | California | January 23, 2009 | First California Bank | 803.3 |
| 4 | MagnetBank | Salt Lake City | Utah | January 30, 2009 | None (insured depositors paid directly) | 292.9 |
| 5 | Suburban FSB | Crofton | Maryland | January 30, 2009 | Bank of Essex | 360 |
| 6 | Ocala National Bank | Ocala | Florida | January 30, 2009 | CenterState Bank of Florida, N.A. | 223.5 |
| 7 | FirstBank Financial Service | McDonough | Georgia | February 6, 2009 | Regions Bank | 337 |
| 8 | Alliance Bank | Culver City | California | February 6, 2009 | California Bank and Trust | 1,140 |
| 9 | County Bank | Merced | California | February 6, 2009 | Westamerica Bank | 1,700 |
| 10 | Sherman County Bank | Loup City | Nebraska | February 13, 2009 | Heritage Bank | 129.8 |
| 11 | Riverside Bank of the Gulf Coast | Cape Coral | Florida | February 13, 2009 | TIB Bank | 539 |
| 12 | Corn Belt Bank & Trust Co. | Pittsfield | Illinois | February 13, 2009 | The Carlinville National Bank | 271.8 |
| 13 | Pinnacle Bank of Oregon | Beaverton | Oregon | February 13, 2009 | Washington Trust Bank of Spokane | 73 |
| 14 | Silver Falls Bank | Silverton | Oregon | February 20, 2009 | Citizens Bank | 131.4 |
| 15 | Heritage Community Bank | Glenwood | Illinois | February 27, 2009 | MB Financial Bank, N.A. | 232.9 |
| 16 | Security Savings Bank | Henderson | Nevada | February 27, 2009 | Bank of Nevada | 238.3 |
| 17 | Freedom Bank of Georgia | Commerce | Georgia | March 6, 2009 | Northeast Georgia Bank | 173 |
| 18 | FirstCity Bank | Stockbridge | Georgia | March 20, 2009 | None (insured depositors paid directly) | 297 |
| 19 | Colorado National Bank | Colorado Springs | Colorado | March 20, 2009 | Herring Bank | 123.9 |
| 20 | TeamBank, N.A. | Paola | Kansas | March 20, 2009 | Great Southern Bank | 669.8 |
| 21 | Omni National Bank | Atlanta | Georgia | March 27, 2009 | SunTrust Bank | 956.0 |
| 22 | Cape Fear Bank | Wilmington | North Carolina | April 10, 2009 | First Federal Savings and Loan Association | 492 |
| 23 | New Frontier Bank | Greeley | Colorado | April 10, 2009 | None (Wound down by FDIC as receiver) | 2,000 |
| 24 | American Sterling Bank | Sugar Creek | Missouri | April 17, 2009 | Metcalf Bank | 181 |
| 25 | Great Basin Bank of Nevada | Elko | Nevada | April 17, 2009 | Nevada State Bank | 271 |
| 26 | American Southern Bank | Kennesaw | Georgia | April 24, 2009 | Bank of North Georgia | 112.3 |
| 27 | Michigan Heritage Bank | Farmington Hills | Michigan | April 24, 2009 | Level One Bank | 184.6 |
| 28 | First Bank of Beverly Hills | Calabasas | California | April 24, 2009 | None (insured depositors paid directly) | 1,500 |
| 29 | First Bank of Idaho | Ketchum | Idaho | April 24, 2009 | U.S. Bank, N.A. | 488.9 |
| 30 | Silverton Bank, N.A. | Atlanta | Georgia | May 1, 2009 | None (insured depositors paid directly) | 4,100 |
| 31 | Citizens Community Bank | Ridgewood | New Jersey | May 1, 2009 | North Jersey Community Bank | 45.1 |
| 32 | America West Bank | Layton | Utah | May 1, 2009 | Cache Valley Bank | 299.4 |
| 33 | Westsound Bank | Bremerton | Washington | May 8, 2009 | Kitsap Bank | 334.6 |
| 34 | BankUnited FSB | Coral Gables | Florida | May 21, 2009 | BankUnited | 12,800 |
| 35 | Strategic Capital Bank | Champaign | Illinois | May 22, 2009 | Midland States Bank | 537 |
| 36 | Citizens National Bank | Macomb | Illinois | May 22, 2009 | Morton Community Bank | 437 |
| 37 | Bank of Lincolnwood | Lincolnwood | Illinois | June 5, 2009 | Republic Bank of Chicago | 214 |
| 38 | Southern Community Bank | Fayetteville | Georgia | June 19, 2009 | United Community Bank | 377 |
| 39 | Cooperative Bank | Wilmington | North Carolina | June 19, 2009 | First Bank | 970 |
| 40 | First National Bank of Anthony | Anthony | Kansas | June 19, 2009 | Bank of Kansas | 156.9 |
| 41 | Community Bank of West Georgia | Villa Rica | Georgia | June 26, 2009 | None (insured depositors paid directly) | 199.4 |
| 42 | Neighborhood Community Bank | Newnan | Georgia | June 26, 2009 | Charterbank | 221.6 |
| 43 | Horizon Bank | Pine City | Minnesota | June 26, 2009 | Stearns Bank, N.A. | 87.6 |
| 44 | MetroPacific Bank | Irvine | California | June 26, 2009 | Sunwest Bank | 80 |
| 45 | Mirae Bank | Los Angeles | California | June 26, 2009 | Wilshire State Bank | 456 |
| 46 | First National Bank of Danville | Danville | Illinois | July 2, 2009 | First Financial Bank, N.A. | 166 |
| 47 | Rock River Bank | Oregon | Illinois | July 2, 2009 | The Harvard State Bank | 77 |
| 48 | John Warner Bank | Clinton | Illinois | July 2, 2009 | State Bank of Lincoln | 70 |
| 49 | First State Bank of Winchester | Winchester | Illinois | July 2, 2009 | The First National Bank of Beardstown | 36 |
| 50 | Elizabeth State Bank | Elizabeth | Illinois | July 2, 2009 | Galena State Bank and Trust Company | 56 |
| 51 | Millennium State Bank of Texas | Dallas | Texas | July 2, 2009 | State Bank of Texas | 118 |
| 52 | Founders Bank | Worth | Illinois | July 2, 2009 | The PrivateBank and Trust Company | 963 |
| 53 | Bank of Wyoming | Thermopolis | Wyoming | July 10, 2009 | Central Bank and Trust | 70 |
| 54 | Temecula Valley Bank | Temecula | California | July 17, 2009 | First-Citizens Bank and Trust Company | 1,500 |
| 55 | Vineyard Bank | Rancho Cucamonga | California | July 17, 2009 | California Bank and Trust | 1,900 |
| 56 | BankFirst | Sioux Falls | South Dakota | July 17, 2009 | Alerus Financial, N.A. | 275 |
| 57 | First Piedmont Bank | Winder | Georgia | July 17, 2009 | First American Bank and Trust Company | 115 |
| 58 | Security Bank of Bibb County | Macon | Georgia | July 24, 2009 | State Bank and Trust Company | 1,200 |
| 59 | Security Bank of North Metro | Woodstock | Georgia | July 24, 2009 | State Bank and Trust Company | 224 |
| 60 | Security Bank of North Fulton | Alpharetta | Georgia | July 24, 2009 | State Bank and Trust Company | 209 |
| 61 | Security Bank of Gwinnett County | Suwanee | Georgia | July 24, 2009 | State Bank and Trust Company | 322 |
| 62 | Security Bank of Jones County | Gray | Georgia | July 24, 2009 | State Bank and Trust Company | 453 |
| 63 | Security Bank of Houston County | Perry | Georgia | July 24, 2009 | State Bank and Trust Company | 383 |
| 64 | Waterford Village Bank | Williamsville | New York | July 24, 2009 | Evans Bank, N.A. | 61 |
| 65 | Integrity Bank | Jupiter | Florida | July 31, 2009 | Stonegate Bank | 119 |
| 66 | First State Bank of Altus | Altus | Oklahoma | July 31, 2009 | Herring Bank | 103 |
| 67 | First BankAmericano | Elizabeth | New Jersey | July 31, 2009 | Crown Bank | 166 |
| 68 | Peoples Community Bank | West Chester | Ohio | July 31, 2009 | First Financial Bank, N.A. | 706 |
| 69 | Mutual Bank | Harvey | Illinois | July 31, 2009 | United Central Bank | 1,600 |
| 70 | First State Bank | Sarasota | Florida | August 7, 2009 | Stearns Bank, N.A. | 463 |
| 71 | Community National Bank of Sarasota County | Venice | Florida | August 7, 2009 | Stearns Bank, N.A. | 97 |
| 72 | Community First Bank | Prineville | Oregon | August 7, 2009 | Home Federal Bank | 209 |
| 73 | Union Bank, N.A. | Gilbert | Arizona | August 14, 2009 | MidFirst Bank | 124 |
| 74 | Dwelling House Savings and Loan Association | Pittsburgh | Pennsylvania | August 14, 2009 | PNC Bank, N.A. | 13 |
| 75 | Colonial Bank | Montgomery | Alabama | August 14, 2009 | Branch Banking and Trust (BB&T) | 25,000 |
| 76 | Community Bank of Arizona | Phoenix | Arizona | August 14, 2009 | MidFirst Bank | 156 |
| 77 | Community Bank of Nevada | Las Vegas | Nevada | August 14, 2009 | None (insured depositors paid directly) | 159 |
| 78 | First Coweta Bank | Newnan | Georgia | August 21, 2009 | United Bank | 167 |
| 79 | Guaranty Bank | Austin | Texas | August 21, 2009 | BBVA Compass | 13,000 |
| 80 | CapitalSouth Bank | Birmingham | Alabama | August 21, 2009 | IBERIABANK | 617 |
| 81 | ebank | Atlanta | Georgia | August 21, 2009 | Stearns Bank, N.A. | 143 |
| 82 | Bradford Bank | Baltimore | Maryland | August 28, 2009 | Manufacturers & Traders Trust Company | 452 |
| 83 | Mainstreet Bank | Forest Lake | Minnesota | August 28, 2009 | Central Bank | 459 |
| 84 | Affinity Bank | Ventura | California | August 28, 2009 | Pacific Western Bank | 1,000 |
| 85 | First Bank of Kansas City | Kansas City | Missouri | September 4, 2009 | Great American Bank | 16 |
| 86 | InBank | Oak Forest | Illinois | September 4, 2009 | MB Financial Bank, N.A. | 212 |
| 87 | Vantus Bank | Sioux City | Iowa | September 4, 2009 | Great Southern Bank | 458 |
| 88 | Platinum Community Bank | Rolling Meadows | Illinois | September 4, 2009 | None (insured depositors paid directly) | 346 |
| 89 | First State Bank | Flagstaff | Arizona | September 4, 2009 | Sunwest Bank | 105 |
| 90 | Corus Bank | Chicago | Illinois | September 11, 2009 | MB Financial Bank, N.A. | 7,000 |
| 91 | Brickwell Community Bank | Woodbury | Minnesota | September 11, 2009 | CorTrust Bank, N.A. | 72 |
| 92 | Venture Bank | Lacey | Washington | September 11, 2009 | First-Citizens Bank and Trust Company | 970 |
| 93 | Irwin Union Bank and Trust Company | Columbus | Indiana | September 18, 2009 | First Financial Bank, N.A. | 2,700 |
| 94 | Irwin Union Bank, F.S.B. | Louisville | Kentucky | September 18, 2009 | First Financial Bank, N.A. | 493 |
| 95 | Georgian Bank | Atlanta | Georgia | September 25, 2009 | First Citizens Bank and Trust Company | 2,000 |
| 96 | Warren Bank | Warren | Michigan | October 2, 2009 | The Huntington National Bank | 538 |
| 97 | Jennings State Bank | Spring Grove | Minnesota | October 2, 2009 | Central Bank | 56 |
| 98 | South Colorado National Bank | Pueblo | Colorado | October 2, 2009 | Legacy Bank | 40 |
| 99 | San Joaquin Bank | Bakersfield | California | October 16, 2009 | Citizens Business Bank | 775 |
| 100 | Partners Bank | Naples | Florida | October 23, 2009 | Stonegate Bank | 66 |
| 101 | American United Bank | Lawrenceville | Georgia | October 23, 2009 | Ameris Bank | 111 |
| 102 | Hillcrest Bank Florida | Naples | Florida | October 23, 2009 | Hillcrest Bank, N.A. | 83 |
| 103 | Flagship National Bank | Bradenton | Florida | October 23, 2009 | First Federal Bank of Florida | 190 |
| 104 | Bank of Elmwood | Racine | Wisconsin | October 23, 2009 | Tri City National Bank | 327 |
| 105 | Riverview Community Bank | Otsego | Minnesota | October 23, 2009 | Central Bank | 108 |
| 106 | First DuPage Bank of Westmont | Westmont | Illinois | October 23, 2009 | First Midwest Bank | 279 |
| 107 | Community Bank of Lemont | Lemont | Illinois | October 30, 2009 | U.S. Bank, N.A. | 82 |
| 108 | Bank USA, N.A. | Phoenix | Arizona | October 30, 2009 | U.S. Bank, N.A. | 213 |
| 109 | California National Bank | Los Angeles | California | October 30, 2009 | U.S. Bank, N.A. | 7,800 |
| 110 | San Diego National Bank | San Diego | California | October 30, 2009 | U.S. Bank, N.A. | 3,600 |
| 111 | Pacific National Bank | San Francisco | California | October 30, 2009 | U.S. Bank, N.A. | 2,300 |
| 112 | Park National Bank | Chicago | Illinois | October 30, 2009 | U.S. Bank, N.A. | 4,700 |
| 113 | Citizens National Bank | Teague | Texas | October 30, 2009 | U.S. Bank, N.A. | 118 |
| 114 | Madisonville State Bank | Madisonville | Texas | October 30, 2009 | U.S. Bank, N.A. | 257 |
| 115 | North Houston Bank | Houston | Texas | October 30, 2009 | U.S. Bank, N.A. | 326 |
| 116 | United Security Bank | Sparta | Georgia | November 6, 2009 | Ameris Bank | 157 |
| 117 | Home Federal Savings Bank | Detroit | Michigan | November 6, 2009 | Liberty Bank and Trust Company | 15 |
| 118 | Prosperan Bank | Oakdale | Minnesota | November 6, 2009 | Alerus Financial, N.A. | 200 |
| 119 | Gateway Bank of St. Louis | St. Louis | Missouri | November 6, 2009 | Central Bank of Kansas City | 28 |
| 120 | United Commercial Bank | San Francisco | California | November 6, 2009 | East West Bank | 11,200 |
| 121 | Century Bank, F.S.B. | Sarasota | Florida | November 13, 2009 | IBERIABANK | 728 |
| 122 | Orion Bank | Naples | Florida | November 13, 2009 | IBERIABANK | 2,700 |
| 123 | Pacific Coast National Bank | San Clemente | California | November 13, 2009 | Sunwest Bank | 134 |
| 124 | Commerce Bank of Southwest Florida | Fort Myers | Florida | November 20, 2009 | Central Bank | 80 |
| 125 | The Buckhead Community Bank | Atlanta | Georgia | December 4, 2009 | State Bank and Trust | 874 |
| 126 | First Security National Bank | Norcross | Georgia | December 4, 2009 | State Bank and Trust | 128 |
| 127 | The Tattnall Bank | Reidsville | Georgia | December 4, 2009 | Heritage Bank of the South | 50 |
| 128 | AmTrust Bank | Cleveland | Ohio | December 4, 2009 | New York Community Bank | 12,000 |
| 129 | Benchmark Bank | Aurora | Illinois | December 4, 2009 | MB Financial Bank, N.A. | 170 |
| 130 | Greater Atlantic Bank | Reston | Virginia | December 4, 2009 | Sonabank | 203 |
| 131 | Republic Federal Bank, N.A. | Miami | Florida | December 11, 2009 | 1st United Bank | 433 |
| 132 | Valley Capital Bank, N.A. | Mesa | Arizona | December 11, 2009 | Enterprise Bank and Trust | 40 |
| 133 | SolutionsBank | Overland Park | Kansas | December 11, 2009 | Arvest Bank | 511 |
| 134 | RockBridge Commercial Bank | Atlanta | Georgia | December 18, 2009 | None (insured depositors paid directly) | 294 |
| 135 | Peoples First Community Bank | Panama City | Florida | December 18, 2009 | Hancock Bank | 1,800 |
| 136 | Citizens State Bank | New Baltimore | Michigan | December 18, 2009 | None (insured depositors paid directly) | 169 |
| 137 | New South Federal Savings Bank | Irondale | Alabama | December 18, 2009 | Beal Bank | 1,500 |
| 138 | Independent Bankers' Bank | Springfield | Illinois | December 18, 2009 | The Independent Bankers Bank | 586 |
| 139 | Imperial Capital Bank | La Jolla | California | December 18, 2009 | City National Bank | 4,000 |
| 140 | First Federal Bank of California, F.S.B. | Santa Monica | California | December 18, 2009 | OneWest Bank, FSB | 6,100 |

== 2010 ==
One hundred fifty-seven banks failed in 2010

| | Bank | City | State | Date | Acquired by | Assets ($mil.) |
|---|---|---|---|---|---|---|
| 1 | Horizon Bank | Bellingham | Washington | January 8, 2010 | Washington Federal Savings and Loan Association | 1,300 |
| 2 | Town Community Bank & Trust | Antioch | Illinois | January 15, 2010 | First American Bank | 70 |
| 3 | St. Stephen State Bank | St. Stephen | Minnesota | January 15, 2010 | First State Bank of St. Joseph | 25 |
| 4 | Barnes Banking Company | Kaysville | Utah | January 15, 2010 | None (insured depositors paid directly) | 828 |
| 5 | Premier American Bank | Miami | Florida | January 22, 2010 | Premier American Bank, N.A. | 351 |
| 6 | Bank of Leeton | Leeton | Missouri | January 22, 2010 | Sunflower Bank, N.A. | 20 |
| 7 | Charter Bank | Santa Fe | New Mexico | January 22, 2010 | Charter Bank | 1,200 |
| 8 | Evergreen Bank | Seattle | Washington | January 22, 2010 | Umpqua Bank | 489 |
| 9 | Columbia River Bank | The Dalles | Oregon | January 22, 2010 | Columbia State Bank | 1,100 |
| 10 | First National Bank of Georgia | Carrollton | Georgia | January 29, 2010 | Community and Southern Bank | 833 |
| 11 | Florida Community Bank | Immokalee | Florida | January 29, 2010 | Premier American Bank, N.A. | 876 |
| 12 | Marshall Bank, N.A. | Hallock | Minnesota | January 29, 2010 | United Valley Bank | 60 |
| 13 | Community Bank and Trust | Cornelia | Georgia | January 29, 2010 | SCBT, N.A. | 1,210 |
| 14 | First Regional Bank | Los Angeles | California | January 29, 2010 | First-Citizens Bank and Trust Company | 2,180 |
| 15 | American Marine Bank | Bainbridge Island | Washington | January 29, 2010 | Columbia State Bank | 373 |
| 16 | 1st American State Bank of Minnesota | Hancock | Minnesota | February 5, 2010 | Community Development Bank, FSB | 18 |
| 17 | La Jolla Bank | La Jolla | California | February 19, 2010 | OneWest Bank, FSB | 3,600 |
| 18 | George Washington Savings Bank | Orland Park | Illinois | February 19, 2010 | FirstMerit Bank, N.A. | 413 |
| 19 | The La Coste National Bank | La Coste | Texas | February 19, 2010 | Community National Bank | 54 |
| 20 | Marco Community Bank | Marco Island | Florida | February 19, 2010 | Mutual of Omaha Bank | 120 |
| 21 | Carson River Community Bank | Carson City | Nevada | February 26, 2010 | Heritage Bank of Nevada | 51 |
| 22 | Rainier Pacific Bank | Tacoma | Washington | February 26, 2010 | Umpqua Bank | 718 |
| 23 | Centennial Bank | Ogden | Utah | March 5, 2010 | None (insured depositors paid directly) | 215 |
| 24 | Waterfield Bank | Germantown | Maryland | March 5, 2010 | None (insured depositors paid directly) | 156 |
| 25 | Bank of Illinois | Normal | Illinois | March 5, 2010 | Heartland Bank and Trust Company | 212 |
| 26 | Sun American Bank | Boca Raton | Florida | March 5, 2010 | First-Citizens Bank and Trust Company | 536 |
| 27 | LibertyPointe Bank | New York | New York | March 12, 2010 | Valley National Bank | 210 |
| 28 | The Park Avenue Bank | New York | New York | March 12, 2010 | Valley National Bank | 520 |
| 29 | Statewide Bank | Covington | Louisiana | March 12, 2010 | Home Bank | 243 |
| 30 | Old Southern Bank | Orlando | Florida | March 12, 2010 | Centennial Bank | 316 |
| 31 | American National Bank | Parma | Ohio | March 19, 2010 | The National Bank and Trust Company | 70 |
| 32 | Advanta Bank Corp | Draper | Utah | March 19, 2010 | None (insured depositors paid directly) | 1,600 |
| 33 | Century Security Bank | Duluth | Georgia | March 19, 2010 | Bank of Upson | 97 |
| 34 | Bank of Hiawassee | Hiawassee | Georgia | March 19, 2010 | Citizens South Bank | 378 |
| 35 | Appalachian Community Bank | Ellijay | Georgia | March 19, 2010 | Community and Southern Bank | 1,010 |
| 36 | First Lowndes Bank | Luverne | Alabama | March 19, 2010 | First Citizens Bank | 137 |
| 37 | State Bank of Aurora | Aurora | Minnesota | March 19, 2010 | Northern State Bank | 28 |
| 38 | Desert Hills Bank | Phoenix | Arizona | March 26, 2010 | New York Community Bank | 497 |
| 39 | Unity National Bank | Cartersville | Georgia | March 26, 2010 | Bank of the Ozarks | 292 |
| 40 | Key West Bank | Key West | Florida | March 26, 2010 | Centennial Bank | 88 |
| 41 | McIntosh Commercial Bank | Carrollton | Georgia | March 26, 2010 | Hamilton State Bank | 363 |
| 42 | Beach First National Bank | Myrtle Beach | South Carolina | April 9, 2010 | Bank of North Carolina | 585 |
| 43 | City Bank | Lynnwood | Washington | April 16, 2010 | Whidbey Island Bank | 1,130 |
| 44 | Tamalpais Bank | San Rafael | California | April 16, 2010 | Union Bank, N.A. | 629 |
| 45 | Innovative Bank | Oakland | California | April 16, 2010 | Center Bank | 269 |
| 46 | Butler Bank | Lowell | Massachusetts | April 16, 2010 | People's United Bank | 268 |
| 47 | Riverside National Bank of Florida | Fort Pierce | Florida | April 16, 2010 | TD Bank, N.A. | 3,420 |
| 48 | AmericanFirst Bank | Clermont | Florida | April 16, 2010 | TD Bank, N.A. | 91 |
| 49 | First Federal Bank of North Florida | Palatka | Florida | April 16, 2010 | TD Bank, N.A. | 393 |
| 50 | Lakeside Community Bank | Sterling Heights | Michigan | April 16, 2010 | None (insured depositors paid directly) | 53 |
| 51 | Amcore Bank | Rockford | Illinois | April 23, 2010 | Harris, N.A. | 3,400 |
| 52 | Broadway Bank | Chicago | Illinois | April 23, 2010 | MB Financial, N.A. | 1,200 |
| 53 | Citizens Bank and Trust Company of Chicago | Chicago | Illinois | April 23, 2010 | Republic Bank of Chicago | 77 |
| 54 | Lincoln Park Saving Bank | Chicago | Illinois | April 23, 2010 | Northbrook Bank and Trust Company | 200 |
| 55 | New Century Bank | Chicago | Illinois | April 23, 2010 | MB Financial, N.A. | 486 |
| 56 | Peotone Bank and Trust Company | Peotone | Illinois | April 23, 2010 | First Midwest Bank | 130 |
| 57 | Wheatland Bank | Naperville | Illinois | April 23, 2010 | Wheaton Bank and Trust | 437 |
| 58 | BC National Banks | Butler | Missouri | April 30, 2010 | Community First Bank | 67 |
| 59 | CF Bancorp | Port Huron | Michigan | April 30, 2010 | First Michigan Bank | 1,650 |
| 60 | Champion Bank | Creve Coeur | Missouri | April 30, 2010 | BankLiberty | 187 |
| 61 | Eurobank | San Juan | Puerto Rico | April 30, 2010 | Orient Bank and Trust | 2,560 |
| 62 | Frontier Bank | Everett | Washington | April 30, 2010 | Union Bank | 3,500 |
| 63 | R-G Premier Bank of Puerto Rico | Hato Rey | Puerto Rico | April 30, 2010 | Scotiabank de Puerto Rico | 5,920 |
| 64 | Westernbank Puerto Rico | Mayaguez | Puerto Rico | April 30, 2010 | Banco Popular de Puerto Rico | 11,940 |
| 65 | 1st Pacific Bank of California | San Diego | California | May 7, 2010 | City National Bank | 336 |
| 66 | Towne Bank of Arizona | Mesa | Arizona | May 7, 2010 | Commerce Bank of Arizona | 120 |
| 67 | Access Bank | Champlin | Minnesota | May 7, 2010 | PrinsBank | 32 |
| 68 | The Bank of Bonifay | Bonifay | Florida | May 7, 2010 | First Federal Bank of Florida | 243 |
| 69 | Midwest Bank and Trust Company | Elmwood Park | Illinois | May 14, 2010 | FirstMerit Bank, N.A. | 3,170 |
| 70 | New Liberty Bank | Plymouth | Michigan | May 14, 2010 | Bank of Ann Arbor | 109 |
| 71 | Satilla Community Bank | St. Marys | Georgia | May 14, 2010 | Ameris Bank | 136 |
| 72 | Southwest Community Bank | Springfield | Missouri | May 14, 2010 | Simmons First National Bank | 97 |
| 73 | Pinehurst Bank | St. Paul | Minnesota | May 21, 2010 | Coulee Bank | 61 |
| 74 | Bank of Florida-Southeast | Fort Lauderdale | Florida | May 28, 2010 | EverBank | 595 |
| 75 | Bank of Florida-Southwest | Naples | Florida | May 28, 2010 | EverBank | 641 |
| 76 | Bank of Florida-Tampa Bay | Tampa | Florida | May 28, 2010 | EverBank | 245 |
| 77 | Sun West Bank | Las Vegas | Nevada | May 28, 2010 | City National Bank | 361 |
| 78 | Granite Community Bank | Granite Bay | California | May 28, 2010 | Tri Counties Bank | 103 |
| 79 | TierOne Bank | Lincoln | Nebraska | June 4, 2010 | Great Western Bank | 2,800 |
| 80 | First National Bank | Rosedale | Mississippi | June 4, 2010 | The Jefferson Bank | 60 |
| 81 | Arcola Homestead Savings Bank | Arcola | Illinois | June 4, 2010 | None (insured depositors paid directly) | 17 |
| 82 | Washington First International Bank | Seattle | Washington | June 11, 2010 | East West Bank | 521 |
| 83 | Nevada Security Bank | Reno | Nevada | June 18, 2010 | Umpqua Bank | 480 |
| 84 | Peninsula Bank | Englewood | Florida | June 25, 2010 | Premier American Bank, N.A. | 644 |
| 85 | First National Bank | Savannah | Georgia | June 25, 2010 | The Savannah Bank | 253 |
| 86 | High Desert State Bank | Albuquerque | New Mexico | June 25, 2010 | First American Bank | 81 |
| 87 | Bay National Bank | Baltimore | Maryland | July 9, 2010 | Bay Bank, FSB | 282 |
| 88 | Ideal Federal Savings Bank | Baltimore | Maryland | July 9, 2010 | None (insured depositors paid directly) | 6 |
| 89 | USA Bank | Port Chester | New York | July 9, 2010 | New Century Bank | 190 |
| 90 | Home National Bank | Blackwell | Oklahoma | July 9, 2010 | RCB Bank | 561 |
| 91 | Woodlands Bank | Bluffton | South Carolina | July 16, 2010 | Bank of the Ozarks | 376 |
| 92 | First National Bank of the South | Spartanburg | South Carolina | July 16, 2010 | NAFH National Bank | 682 |
| 93 | Mainstreet Savings Bank | Hastings | Michigan | July 16, 2010 | Commercial Bank | 97 |
| 94 | Metro Bank of Dade County | Miami | Florida | July 16, 2010 | NAFH National Bank | 442 |
| 95 | Turnberry Bank | Aventura | Florida | July 16, 2010 | NAFH National Bank | 264 |
| 96 | Olde Cypress Community Bank | Clewiston | Florida | July 16, 2010 | CenterState Bank of Florida | 169 |
| 97 | Community Security Bank | New Prague | Minnesota | July 23, 2010 | Roundbank | 108 |
| 98 | Crescent Bank and Trust Co | Jasper | Georgia | July 23, 2010 | Renasant Bank | 1,000 |
| 99 | Sterling Bank | Lantana | Florida | July 23, 2010 | IBERIABANK | 408 |
| 100 | Williamsburg First National Bank | Kingstree | South Carolina | July 23, 2010 | First Citizens Bank and Trust Company | 139 |
| 101 | Thunder Bank | Sylvan Grove | Kansas | July 23, 2010 | The Bennington State Bank | 33 |
| 102 | SouthwestUSA Bank | Las Vegas | Nevada | July 23, 2010 | Plaza Bank | 214 |
| 103 | Home Valley Bank | Cave Junction | Oregon | July 23, 2010 | South Valley Bank and Trust | 252 |
| 104 | Bayside Savings Bank | Port Saint Joe | Florida | July 30, 2010 | Centennial Bank | 66 |
| 105 | Coastal Community Bank | Panama City | Florida | July 30, 2010 | Centennial Bank | 373 |
| 106 | NorthWest Bank and Trust | Acworth | Georgia | July 30, 2010 | State Bank and Trust Company | 168 |
| 107 | The Cowlitz Bank | Longview | Washington | July 30, 2010 | Heritage Bank | 529 |
| 108 | LibertyBank | Eugene | Oregon | July 30, 2010 | Home Federal Bank | 768 |
| 109 | Ravenswood Bank | Chicago | Illinois | August 6, 2010 | Northbrook Bank and Trust Company | 265 |
| 110 | Palos Bank and Trust | Palos Heights | Illinois | August 13, 2010 | First Midwest Bank | 493 |
| 111 | ShoreBank | Chicago | Illinois | August 20, 2010 | Urban Partnership Bank | 2,160 |
| 112 | Community National Bank at Bartow | Bartow | Florida | August 20, 2010 | CenterState Bank of Florida | 68 |
| 113 | Independent National Bank | Ocala | Florida | August 20, 2010 | CenterState Bank of Florida | 156 |
| 114 | Imperial Savings & Loan | Martinsville | Virginia | August 20, 2010 | River Community Bank, N.A. | 9 |
| 115 | Butte Community Bank | Chico | California | August 20, 2010 | Rabobank, N.A. | 499 |
| 116 | Pacific State Bank | Stockton | California | August 20, 2010 | Rabobank, N.A. | 312 |
| 117 | Los Padres Bank | Solvang | California | August 20, 2010 | Pacific Western Bank | 870 |
| 118 | Sonoma Valley Bank | Sonoma | California | August 20, 2010 | Westamerica Bank | 337 |
| 119 | Horizon Bank | Bradenton | Florida | September 10, 2010 | Bank of the Ozarks | 188 |
| 120 | Bank of Ellijay | Ellijay | Georgia | September 17, 2010 | Community and Southern Bank | 169 |
| 121 | First Commerce Community Bank | Douglasville | Georgia | September 17, 2010 | Community and Southern Bank | 248 |
| 122 | Peoples Bank | Winder | Georgia | September 17, 2010 | Community and Southern Bank | 447 |
| 123 | ISN Bank | Cherry Hill | New Jersey | September 17, 2010 | Customers Bank | 82 |
| 124 | Bramble Savings Bank | Milford | Ohio | September 17, 2010 | Foundation Bank | 48 |
| 125 | Maritime Savings Bank | West Allis | Wisconsin | September 17, 2010 | North Shore Bank, FSB | 351 |
| 126 | Haven Trust Bank Florida | Ponte Vedra Beach | Florida | September 24, 2010 | First Southern Bank | 149 |
| 127 | North County Bank | Arlington | Washington | September 24, 2010 | Whidbey Island Bank | 289 |
| 128 | Wakulla Bank | Crawfordville | Florida | October 1, 2010 | Centennial Bank | 424 |
| 129 | Shoreline Bank | Shoreline | Washington | October 1, 2010 | GBC International Bank | 104 |
| 130 | Security Savings Bank, FSB | Olathe | Kansas | October 15, 2010 | Simmons First National Bank | 508 |
| 131 | WestBridge Bank and Trust Company | Chesterfield | Missouri | October 15, 2010 | Midland State Bank | 92 |
| 132 | Premier Bank | Jefferson City | Missouri | October 15, 2010 | Providence Bank | 1,200 |
| 133 | Hillcrest Bank | Overland Park | Kansas | October 22, 2010 | Hillcrest Bank, N.A. | 1,600 |
| 134 | First Bank of Jacksonville | Jacksonville | Florida | October 22, 2010 | Ameris Bank | 81 |
| 135 | Progress Bank of Florida | Tampa | Florida | October 22, 2010 | Bay Cities Bank | 111 |
| 136 | First National Bank of Barnesville | Barnesville | Georgia | October 22, 2010 | United Bank | 131 |
| 137 | Gordon Bank | Gordon | Georgia | October 22, 2010 | Morris Bank | 29 |
| 138 | First Suburban National Bank | Maywood | Illinois | October 22, 2010 | Seaway Bank and Trust Company | 149 |
| 139 | First Arizona Savings | Scottsdale | Arizona | October 22, 2010 | None (insured depositors paid directly) | 272 |
| 140 | K Bank | Randallstown | Maryland | November 5, 2010 | Manufacturers and Traders Trust Company | 538 |
| 141 | Western Commercial Bank | Woodland Hills | California | November 5, 2010 | First California Bank | 99 |
| 142 | First Vietnamese American Bank | Westminster | California | November 5, 2010 | Grandpoint Bank | 48 |
| 143 | Pierce Commercial Bank | Tacoma | Washington | November 5, 2010 | Heritage Bank | 221 |
| 144 | Tifton Banking Company | Tifton | Georgia | November 12, 2010 | Ameris Bank | 144 |
| 145 | Darby Bank & Trust | Vidalia | Georgia | November 12, 2010 | Ameris Bank | 655 |
| 146 | Copper Star Bank | Scottsdale | Arizona | November 12, 2010 | Stearns Bank, N.A. | 204 |
| 147 | Gulf State Community Bank | Carrabelle | Florida | November 19, 2010 | Centennial Bank | 112 |
| 148 | Allegiance Bank of North America | Bala Cynwyd | Pennsylvania | November 19, 2010 | VIST Bank | 106 |
| 149 | First Banking Center | Burlington | Wisconsin | November 19, 2010 | First Michigan Bank | 821 |
| 150 | Paramount Bank | Farmington Hills | Michigan | December 10, 2010 | Level One Bank | 253 |
| 151 | Earthstar Bank | Southampton | Pennsylvania | December 10, 2010 | Polonia Bank | 113 |
| 152 | Chestatee State Bank | Dawsonville | Georgia | December 17, 2010 | Bank of the Ozarks | 244 |
| 153 | First Southern Bank | Batesville | Arkansas | December 17, 2010 | Southern Bank | 156 |
| 154 | Community National Bank | Lino Lakes | Minnesota | December 17, 2010 | Farmers & Merchants Savings Bank | 29 |
| 155 | United Americas Bank | Atlanta | Georgia | December 17, 2010 | State Bank and Trust Company | 194 |
| 156 | Appalachian Community Bank | McCaysville | Georgia | December 17, 2010 | Peoples Bank of East Tennessee | 68 |
| 157 | The Bank of Miami, N.A. | Coral Gables | Florida | December 17, 2010 | 1st United Bank | 448 |

== 2011 ==
Ninety-two banks failed in 2011

| | Bank | City | State | Date | Acquired by | Assets ($mil.) |
|---|---|---|---|---|---|---|
| 1 | First Commercial Bank of Florida | Orlando | Florida | January 7, 2011 | First Southern Bank | 599 |
| 2 | Legacy Bank | Scottsdale | Arizona | January 7, 2011 | Enterprise Bank and Trust | 151 |
| 3 | Oglethorpe Bank | Brunswick | Georgia | January 14, 2011 | Bank of the Ozarks | 231 |
| 4 | Enterprise Banking Company | McDonough | Georgia | January 21, 2011 | None (insured depositors paid directly) | 96 |
| 5 | CommunitySouth Bank and Trust | Easley | South Carolina | January 21, 2011 | CertusBank, N.A. | 402 |
| 6 | Bank of Asheville | Asheville | North Carolina | January 21, 2011 | First Bank | 188 |
| 7 | United Western Bank | Denver | Colorado | January 21, 2011 | First-Citizens Bank and Trust Company | 1,650 |
| 8 | FirsTier Bank | Louisville | Colorado | January 28, 2011 | None (insured depositors paid directly) | 782 |
| 9 | First Community Bank | Taos | New Mexico | January 28, 2011 | U.S. Bank, N.A. | 2,300 |
| 10 | First State Bank | Camargo | Oklahoma | January 28, 2011 | Bank 7 | 44 |
| 11 | Evergreen State Bank | Stoughton | Wisconsin | January 28, 2011 | McFarland State Bank | 247 |
| 12 | American Trust Bank | Roswell | Georgia | February 4, 2011 | Renasant Bank | 238 |
| 13 | North Georgia Bank | Watkinsville | Georgia | February 4, 2011 | BankSouth | 153 |
| 14 | Community First Bank | Chicago | Illinois | February 4, 2011 | Northbrook Bank and Trust | 51 |
| 15 | Peoples State Bank | Hamtramck | Michigan | February 11, 2011 | First Michigan Bank | 391 |
| 16 | Canyon National Bank | Palm Springs | California | February 11, 2011 | Pacific Premier Bank | 211 |
| 17 | Sunshine State Community Bank | Port Orange | Florida | February 11, 2011 | Premier American Bank, N.A. | 126 |
| 18 | Badger State Bank | Cassville | Wisconsin | February 11, 2011 | Royal Bank | 84 |
| 19 | Habersham Bank | Clarkesville | Georgia | February 18, 2011 | SCBT, N.A. | 387 |
| 20 | Citizens Bank of Effingham | Springfield | Georgia | February 18, 2011 | Heritage Bank of the South | 214 |
| 21 | Charter Oak Bank | Napa | California | February 18, 2011 | Bank of Marin | 121 |
| 22 | San Luis Trust Bank, FSB | San Luis Obispo | California | February 18, 2011 | First California Bank | 333 |
| 23 | Valley Community Bank | St. Charles | Illinois | February 25, 2011 | First State Bank | 123 |
| 24 | First National Bank of Davis | Davis | Oklahoma | March 11, 2011 | The Pauls Valley National Bank | 90 |
| 25 | Legacy Bank | Milwaukee | Wisconsin | March 11, 2011 | Seaway Bank and Trust Company | 190 |
| 26 | Bank of Commerce | Wood Dale | Illinois | March 25, 2011 | Advantage National Bank Group | 163 |
| 27 | Western Springs National Bank and Trust | Western Springs | Illinois | April 11, 2011 | Heartland Bank and Trust Company | 186 |
| 28 | Nevada Commerce Bank | Las Vegas | Nevada | April 11, 2011 | City National Bank | 144 |
| 29 | Bartow County Bank | Cartersville | Georgia | April 15, 2011 | Hamilton State Bank | 330 |
| 30 | New Horizons Bank | East Ellijay | Georgia | April 15, 2011 | Citizens South Bank | 110 |
| 31 | Nexity Bank | Birmingham | Alabama | April 15, 2011 | AloStar Bank of Commerce | 793 |
| 32 | Superior Bank | Birmingham | Alabama | April 15, 2011 | Superior Bank, N.A. | 3,000 |
| 33 | Rosemount National Bank | Rosemount | Minnesota | April 15, 2011 | Central Bank | 37 |
| 34 | Heritage Banking Group | Carthage | Mississippi | April 15, 2011 | TrustMark National Bank | 224 |
| 35 | Community Central Bank | Mount Clemens | Michigan | April 29, 2011 | Talmer Bank and Trust | 476 |
| 36 | Park Avenue Bank | Valdosta | Georgia | April 29, 2011 | Bank of the Ozarks | 953 |
| 37 | First Choice Community Bank | Dallas | Georgia | April 29, 2011 | Bank of the Ozarks | 309 |
| 38 | Cortez Community Bank | Brooksville | Florida | April 29, 2011 | Florida Community Bank | 71 |
| 39 | First National Bank of Central Florida | Winter Park | Florida | April 29, 2011 | Florida Community Bank | 352 |
| 40 | Coastal Bank | Cocoa Beach | Florida | May 6, 2011 | Florida Community Bank | 129 |
| 41 | Atlantic Southern Bank | Macon | Georgia | May 20, 2011 | CertusBank, N.A. | 742 |
| 42 | First Georgia Banking Company | Franklin | Georgia | May 20, 2011 | CertusBank, N.A. | 731 |
| 43 | Summit Bank | Burlington | Washington | May 20, 2011 | Columbia State Bank | 143 |
| 44 | First Heritage Bank | Snohomish | Washington | May 27, 2011 | Columbia State Bank | 174 |
| 45 | Atlantic Bank and Trust | Charleston | South Carolina | June 3, 2011 | First Citizens Bank and Trust Company | 208 |
| 46 | McIntosh State Bank | Jackson | Georgia | June 17, 2011 | Hamilton Bank | 339.9 |
| 47 | First Commercial Bank of Tampa Bay | Tampa | Florida | June 17, 2011 | Stonegate Bank | 98.6 |
| 48 | Mountain Heritage Bank | Clayton | Georgia | June 24, 2011 | First American Bank and Trust Company | 103.7 |
| 49 | First Chicago Bank & Trust | Chicago | Illinois | July 8, 2011 | Northbrook Bank and Trust Company | 959.3 |
| 50 | Colorado Capital Bank | Castle Rock | Colorado | July 8, 2011 | First-Citizens Bank and Trust Company | 717.5 |
| 51 | Signature Bank | Windsor | Colorado | July 8, 2011 | Points West Community Bank | 66.7 |
| 52 | One Georgia Bank | Atlanta | Georgia | July 15, 2011 | Ameris Bank | 186.3 |
| 53 | High Trust Bank | Stockbridge | Georgia | July 15, 2011 | Ameris Bank | 192.5 |
| 54 | First Peoples Bank | Port St. Lucie | Florida | July 15, 2011 | Premier American Bank, N.A. | 228.3 |
| 55 | Summit Bank | Prescott | Arizona | July 15, 2011 | The Foothills Bank | 72.0 |
| 56 | Southshore Community Bank | Apollo Beach | Florida | July 22, 2011 | American Momentum Bank | 46.3 |
| 57 | LandMark Bank of Florida | Sarasota | Florida | July 22, 2011 | American Momentum Bank | 275.0 |
| 58 | Bank of Choice | Greeley | Colorado | July 22, 2011 | Bank Midwest, N.A. | 1,070 |
| 59 | Virginia Business Bank | Richmond | Virginia | July 29, 2011 | Xenith Bank | 95.8 |
| 60 | BankMeridian, N.A. | Columbia | South Carolina | July 29, 2011 | SCBT, N.A. | 239.8 |
| 61 | Integra Bank, N.A. | Evansville | Indiana | July 29, 2011 | Old National Bank | 2,200 |
| 62 | Bank of Shorewood | Shorewood | Illinois | August 5, 2011 | Heartland Bank and Trust Company | 110.7 |
| 63 | Bank of Whitman | Colfax | Washington | August 5, 2011 | Columbia State Bank | 548.6 |
| 64 | The First National Bank of Olathe | Olathe | Kansas | August 12, 2011 | Enterprise Bank and Trust | 538.1 |
| 65 | Public Savings Bank | Huntingdon Valley | Pennsylvania | August 18, 2011 | Capital Bank, N.A. | 46.8 |
| 66 | Lydian Private Bank | Palm Beach | Florida | August 19, 2011 | Sabadell United Bank, N.A. | 1,700 |
| 67 | First Southern National Bank | Statesboro | Georgia | August 19, 2011 | Heritage Bank of the South | 164.6 |
| 68 | First Choice Bank | Geneva | Illinois | August 19, 2011 | Inland Bank and Trust | 141 |
| 69 | Patriot Bank of Georgia | Cumming | Georgia | September 2, 2011 | Georgia Commerce Bank | 150.8 |
| 70 | CreekSide Bank | Woodstock | Georgia | September 2, 2011 | Georgia Community Bank | 102.3 |
| 71 | First National Bank of Florida | Milton | Florida | September 9, 2011 | Charter Bank | 296.8 |
| 72 | Bank of the Commonwealth | Norfolk | Virginia | September 23, 2011 | Southern Bank and Trust Company | 985.1 |
| 73 | Citizens Bank of Northern California | Nevada City | California | September 23, 2011 | Tri Counties Bank | 288.8 |
| 74 | First International Bank | Plano | Texas | September 30, 2011 | American First National Bank | 239.9 |
| 75 | The RiverBank | Wyoming | Minnesota | October 7, 2011 | Central Bank | 417.4 |
| 76 | Sun Security Bank | Ellington | Missouri | October 7, 2011 | Great Southern Bank | 355.9 |
| 77 | Piedmont Community Bank | Gray | Georgia | October 14, 2011 | State Bank and Trust Company | 201.7 |
| 78 | Blue Ridge Savings Bank | Asheville | North Carolina | October 14, 2011 | Bank of North Carolina | 161 |
| 79 | First State Bank | Cranford | New Jersey | October 14, 2011 | Northfield Bank (Staten Island, NY) | 204.4 |
| 80 | Country Bank | Aledo | Illinois | October 14, 2011 | Blackhawk Bank & Trust | 190.6 |
| 81 | Old Harbor Bank | Clearwater | Florida | October 21, 2011 | 1st United Bank | 215.9 |
| 82 | Decatur First Bank | Decatur | Georgia | October 21, 2011 | Fidelity Bank | 191.5 |
| 83 | Community Capital Bank | Jonesboro | Georgia | October 21, 2011 | State Bank and Trust Company | 181.2 |
| 84 | Community Banks of Colorado | Greenwood Village | Colorado | October 21, 2011 | Bank Midwest, N.A. | 1,380 |
| 85 | All American Bank | Des Plaines | Illinois | October 28, 2011 | International Bank of Chicago | 37.8 |
| 86 | Mid City Bank, Inc. | Omaha | Nebraska | November 4, 2011 | Premier Bank | 106.1 |
| 87 | SunFirst Bank | Saint George | Utah | November 4, 2011 | Cache Valley Bank | 376.2 |
| 88 | Community Bank of Rockmart | Rockmart | Georgia | November 10, 2011 | Century Bank of Georgia | 62.4 |
| 89 | Polk County Bank | Johnston | Iowa | November 18, 2011 | Grinnell State Bank | 91.6 |
| 90 | Central Progressive Bank | Lacombe | Louisiana | November 18, 2011 | First NBC Bank | 383.1 |
| 91 | Premier Community Bank of the Emerald Coast | Crestview | Florida | December 16, 2011 | Summit Bank | 126.0 |
| 92 | Western National Bank | Phoenix | Arizona | December 16, 2011 | Washington Federal | 162.9 |

== 2012 ==
Fifty-one banks failed in 2012

| | Bank | City | State | Date | Acquired by | Assets ($mil.) |
|---|---|---|---|---|---|---|
| 1 | Central Florida State Bank | Belleview | Florida | January 20, 2012 | CenterState Bank of Florida | 79.1 |
| 2 | The First State Bank | Stockbridge | Georgia | January 20, 2012 | Hamilton State Bank | 536.9 |
| 3 | American Eagle Savings Bank | Boothwyn | Pennsylvania | January 20, 2012 | Capital Bank, N.A. | 19.6 |
| 4 | First Guaranty Bank and Trust Company of Jacksonville | Jacksonville | Florida | January 27, 2012 | CenterState Bank of Florida | 377.9 |
| 5 | Tennessee Commerce Bank | Franklin | Tennessee | January 27, 2012 | Republic Bank & Trust Company | 1,185 |
| 6 | Patriot Bank Minnesota | Forest Lake | Minnesota | January 27, 2012 | First Resource Bank | 111.3 |
| 7 | BankEast | Knoxville | Tennessee | January 27, 2012 | U.S. Bancorp | 272.6 |
| 8 | Charter National Bank and Trust | Hoffman Estates | Illinois | February 10, 2012 | Barrington Bank & Trust Company, N.A. | 93.9 |
| 9 | SCB Bank | Shelbyville | Indiana | February 10, 2012 | First Merchants Bank, N.A. | 182.6 |
| 10 | Central Bank of Georgia | Ellaville | Georgia | February 24, 2012 | Ameris Bank | 278.9 |
| 11 | Home Savings of America | Little Falls | Minnesota | February 24, 2012 | None (Closed permanently by the FDIC) | 434.1 |
| 12 | Global Commerce Bank | Doraville | Georgia | March 2, 2012 | Metro City Bank | 143.7 |
| 13 | New City Bank | Chicago | Illinois | March 9, 2012 | None (Closed permanently by the FDIC) | 71.2 |
| 14 | Covenant Bank & Trust | Rock Spring | Georgia | March 23, 2012 | Stearns Bank, N.A. | 95.7 |
| 15 | Premier Bank | Wilmette | Illinois | March 23, 2012 | International Bank of Chicago | 268.7 |
| 16 | Fidelity Bank | Dearborn | Michigan | March 30, 2012 | Huntington National Bank | 818.2 |
| 17 | Fort Lee Federal Savings Bank, FSB | Fort Lee | New Jersey | April 20, 2012 | Alma Bank | 51.9 |
| 18 | Bank of the Eastern Shore | Cambridge | Maryland | April 27, 2012 | None (Wound down by FDIC as receiver) | 166.7 |
| 19 | HarVest Bank of Maryland | Gaithersburg | Maryland | April 27, 2012 | Sonabank | 164.3 |
| 20 | Inter Savings Bank, FSB | Maple Grove | Minnesota | April 27, 2012 | Great Southern Bank | 481.6 |
| 21 | Plantation Federal Bank | Pawleys Island | South Carolina | April 27, 2012 | First Federal Bank | 486.4 |
| 22 | Palm Desert National Bank | Palm Desert | California | April 27, 2012 | Pacific Premier | 125.8 |
| 23 | Security Bank, N.A. | North Lauderdale | Florida | May 4, 2012 | Banesco | 101.0 |
| 24 | Alabama Trust Bank, N.A. | Sylacauga | Alabama | May 18, 2012 | Southern States Bank | 51.6 |
| 25 | First Capital Bank | Kingfisher | Oklahoma | June 8, 2012 | F & M Bank | 46.1 |
| 26 | Carolina Federal Savings Bank | Charleston | South Carolina | June 8, 2012 | Bank of North Carolina | 54.4 |
| 27 | Farmers and Traders State Bank | Shabbona | Illinois | June 8, 2012 | First State Bank | 43.1 |
| 28 | Waccamaw Bank | Whiteville | North Carolina | June 8, 2012 | First Community Bank | 533.1 |
| 29 | Putnam State Bank | Palatka | Florida | June 15, 2012 | Harbor Community Bank | 169.5 |
| 30 | Security Exchange Bank | Marietta | Georgia | June 15, 2012 | Fidelity Bank | 151.0 |
| 31 | The Farmers Bank of Lynchburg | Lynchburg | Tennessee | June 15, 2012 | Clayton Bank and Trust | 163.9 |
| 32 | Montgomery Bank and Trust | Ailey | Georgia | July 6, 2012 | Ameris | 173.6 |
| 33 | Glasgow Savings Bank | Glasgow | Missouri | July 13, 2012 | Regional Missouri Bank | 24.8 |
| 34 | Royal Palm Bank of Florida | Naples | Florida | July 20, 2012 | First National Bank of the Gulf Coast | 87.0 |
| 35 | Georgia Trust Bank | Buford | Georgia | July 20, 2012 | Community & Southern Bank | 119.8 |
| 36 | First Cherokee State Bank | Woodstock | Georgia | July 20, 2012 | Community & Southern Bank | 222.7 |
| 37 | Heartland Bank | Leawood | Kansas | July 20, 2012 | Metcalf Bank | 110.0 |
| 38 | Second Federal Savings and Loan Association of Chicago | Chicago | Illinois | July 20, 2012 | Hinsdale Bank & Trust Company | 199.1 |
| 39 | Jasper Banking Company | Jasper | Georgia | July 27, 2012 | Stearns Bank, N.A. | 216.7 |
| 40 | Waukegan Savings Bank | Waukegan | Illinois | August 3, 2012 | First Midwest Bank | 88.9 |
| 41 | First Community Bank | Bloomington | Minnesota | September 7, 2012 | Republic Bank & Trust Company | 215.9 |
| 42 | Truman Bank | St. Louis | Missouri | September 14, 2012 | Simmons First National Bank | 282.3 |
| 43 | First United Bank | Crete | Illinois | September 28, 2012 | Old Plank Trail Community Bank, National Association | 328.4 |
| 44 | GulfSouth Private Bank | Destin | Florida | October 19, 2012 | SmartBank | 159.1 |
| 45 | First East Side Savings Bank | Tamarac | Florida | October 19, 2012 | Stearns Bank, N.A. | 67.2 |
| 46 | Excel Bank | Sedalia | Missouri | October 19, 2012 | Simmons First National Bank | 200.6 |
| 47 | NOVA Bank | Berwyn | Pennsylvania | October 26, 2012 | NONE (Permanently closed by the Pennsylvania Department of Banking & Securities) | 483.0 |
| 48 | Heritage Bank of Florida | Lutz | Florida | November 2, 2012 | Centennial Bank | 225.5 |
| 49 | Citizens First National Bank | Princeton | Illinois | November 2, 2012 | Heartland Bank and Trust Company | 924.0 |
| 50 | Hometown Community Bank | Braselton | Georgia | November 16, 2012 | CertusBank, National Association | 124.6 |
| 51 | Community Bank of the Ozarks | Sunrise Beach | Missouri | December 14, 2012 | Bank of Sullivan | 42.8 |

== 2013 ==
Twenty-four banks failed in 2013

| | Bank | City | State | Date | Acquired by | Assets ($mil.) |
|---|---|---|---|---|---|---|
| 1 | Westside Community Bank | University Place | Washington | January 11, 2013 | Sunwest Bank | 97.7 |
| 2 | 1st Regents Bank | Andover | Minnesota | January 18, 2013 | First Minnesota Bank | 50.2 |
| 3 | Covenant Bank | Chicago | Illinois | February 15, 2013 | Liberty Bank and Trust Company | 58.4 |
| 4 | Frontier Bank | LaGrange | Georgia | March 8, 2013 | HeritageBank of the South | 258.8 |
| 5 | Gold Canyon Bank | Gold Canyon | Arizona | April 5, 2013 | First Scottsdale Bank, N.A. | 45.2 |
| 6 | First Federal Bank | Lexington | Kentucky | April 19, 2013 | Your Community Bank | 100.1 |
| 7 | Heritage Bank of North Florida | Orange Park | Florida | April 19, 2013 | FirstAtlantic Bank | 110.9 |
| 8 | Chipola Community Bank | Marianna | Florida | April 19, 2013 | First Federal Bank of Florida | 39.2 |
| 9 | Parkway Bank | Lenoir | North Carolina | April 26, 2013 | CertusBank, N.A. | 108.6 |
| 10 | Douglas County Bank | Douglasville | Georgia | April 26, 2013 | Hamilton State Bank | 316.5 |
| 11 | Pisgah Community Bank | Asheville | North Carolina | May 10, 2013 | Capital Bank, N.A. | 21.9 |
| 12 | Sunrise Bank | Valdosta | Georgia | May 10, 2013 | Synovus Bank | 60.8 |
| 13 | Central Arizona Bank | Scottsdale | Arizona | May 14, 2013 | Western State Bank | 31.6 |
| 14 | Banks of Wisconsin | Kenosha | Wisconsin | May 31, 2013 | North Shore Bank, FSB | 134.0 |
| 15 | 1st Commerce Bank | North Las Vegas | Nevada | June 6, 2013 | Plaza Bank | 20.2 |
| 16 | Mountain National Bank | Sevierville | Tennessee | June 7, 2013 | First Tennessee Bank, National Association | 437.3 |
| 17 | First Community Bank of South Florida | Fort Myers | Florida | August 2, 2013 | C1 Bank | 265.7 |
| 18 | Bank of Wausau | Wausau | Wisconsin | August 9, 2013 | Nicolet National Bank | 43.6 |
| 19 | Community South Bank | Parsons | Tennessee | August 23, 2013 | CB&S Bank, Inc. | 386.9 |
| 20 | Sunrise Bank of Arizona | Phoenix | Arizona | August 23, 2013 | First Fidelity Bank, National Association | 202.2 |
| 21 | The Community's Bank | Bridgeport | Connecticut | September 13, 2013 | None (insured depositors paid directly) | 26.3 |
| 22 | First National Bank, also operating as The National Bank of El Paso | Edinburg | Texas | September 13, 2013 | PlainsCapital Bank | 3,100 |
| 23 | Bank of Jackson County | Graceville | Florida | October 30, 2013 | First Federal Bank of Florida | 25.5 |
| 24 | Texas Community Bank, National Association | The Woodlands | Texas | December 13, 2013 | Spirit of Texas Bank, SSB | 180.1 |

== 2014 ==
Eighteen banks failed in 2014

| | Bank | City | State | Date | Acquired by | Assets ($mil.) |
|---|---|---|---|---|---|---|
| 1 | Dupage National Bank | West Chicago | Illinois | January 17, 2014 | Republic Bank of Chicago | 61.7 |
| 2 | The Bank of Union | El Reno | Oklahoma | January 24, 2014 | BancFirst | 331.40 |
| 3 | Syringa Bank | Boise | Idaho | January 31, 2014 | Sunwest Bank | 153.40 |
| 4 | Vantage Point Bank | Horsham | Pennsylvania | February 28, 2014 | First Choice Bank | 63.5 |
| 5 | Millennium Bank, National Association | Sterling | Virginia | February 28, 2014 | WashingtonFirst Bank | 130.3 |
| 6 | Allendale County Bank | Fairfax | South Carolina | April 25, 2014 | Palmetto State Bank | 54.5 |
| 7 | AztecAmerica Bank En Español | Berwyn | Illinois | May 16, 2014 | Republic Bank of Chicago | 66.3 |
| 8 | Columbia Savings Bank | Cincinnati | Ohio | May 23, 2014 | United Fidelity Bank, fsb | 36.5 |
| 9 | Slavie Federal Savings Bank | Bel Air | Maryland | May 30, 2014 | Bay Bank, FSB | 140.1 |
| 10 | Valley Bank | Moline | Illinois | June 20, 2014 | Great Southern Bank | 456.4 |
| 11 | Valley Bank | Fort Lauderdale | Florida | June 20, 2014 | Landmark Bank, National Association | 81.8 |
| 12 | The Freedom State Bank | Freedom | Oklahoma | June 27, 2014 | Alva State Bank & Trust Company | 22.8 |
| 13 | Eastside Commercial Bank | Conyers | Georgia | July 18, 2014 | Community & Southern Bank | 169.0 |
| 14 | GreenChoice Bank, fsb | Chicago | Illinois | July 25, 2014 | Providence Bank, LLC | 72.9 |
| 15 | NBRS Financial | Rising Sun | Maryland | October 17, 2014 | Howard Bank | 188.2 |
| 16 | The National Republic Bank of Chicago | Chicago | Illinois | October 24, 2014 | State Bank of Texas | 954.4 |
| 17 | Frontier Bank, FSB D/B/A El Paseo Bank | Palm Desert | California | November 7, 2014 | Bank of Southern California, N.A. | 86.4 |
| 18 | Northern Star Bank | Mankato | Minnesota | December 19, 2014 | BankVista | 18.2 |

== 2015 ==
Eight banks failed in 2015

| | Bank | City | State | Date | Acquired by | Assets ($mil.) |
|---|---|---|---|---|---|---|
| 1 | First National Bank of Crestview | Crestview | Florida | January 16, 2015 | First NBC Bank | 79.7 |
| 2 | Highland Community Bank | Chicago | Illinois | January 23, 2015 | United Fidelity Bank, FSB | 54.7 |
| 3 | Capitol City Bank and Trust | Atlanta | Georgia | February 13, 2015 | First-Citizens Bank and Trust Company | 272.3 |
| 4 | Doral Bank | San Juan | Puerto Rico | February 27, 2015 | Banco Popular de Puerto Rico | 5,900 |
| 5 | Edgebrook Bank | Chicago | Illinois | May 8, 2015 | Republic Bank of Chicago | 90.0 |
| 6 | Premier Bank | Denver | Colorado | July 10, 2015 | United Fidelity Bank, FSB | 31.7 |
| 7 | The Bank of Georgia | Peachtree City | Georgia | October 2, 2015 | Fidelity Bank | 294.2 |
| 8 | Hometown National Bank | Longview | Washington | October 2, 2015 | Twin City Bank | 4.9 |

== 2016 ==
Five banks failed in 2016

| | Bank | City | State | Date | Acquired By | Assets ($mil.) |
|---|---|---|---|---|---|---|
| 1 | North Milwaukee State Bank | Milwaukee | Wisconsin | March 11, 2016 | First Citizens BancShares | 67.1 |
| 2 | Trust Company Bank | Memphis | Tennessee | April 29, 2016 | The Bank of Fayette County | 20.7 |
| 3 | First CornerStone | King of Prussia | Pennsylvania | May 6, 2016 | First Citizens BancShares | 103.3 |
| 4 | The Woodbury Banking Company | Woodbury | Georgia | August 19, 2016 | United Bank | 21.4 |
| 5 | Allied Bank | Mulberry | Arkansas | September 23, 2016 | Today's Bank | 66.3 |

== 2017 ==
Eight banks failed in 2017

| | Bank | City | State | Date | Acquired By | Assets ($mil.) |
|---|---|---|---|---|---|---|
| 1 | Harvest Community Bank | Pennsville | New Jersey | January 13, 2017 | First Citizens BancShares | 126.4 |
| 2 | Seaway Bank and Trust Company | Chicago | Illinois | January 27, 2017 | State Bank of Texas | 361.2 |
| 3 | Proficio Bank | Cottonwood Heights | Utah | March 3, 2017 | Cache Valley Bank | 68.2 |
| 4 | First NBC Bank | New Orleans | Louisiana | April 28, 2017 | Whitney Bank | 4,740 |
| 5 | Guaranty Bank (d/b/a BestBank in Georgia and Michigan) | Milwaukee | Wisconsin | May 5, 2017 | First-Citizens Bank & Trust Company | 13,000 |
| 6 | Fayette County Bank | St. Elmo | Illinois | May 26, 2017 | United Fidelity Bank FSB | 34.4 |
| 7 | The Farmers and Merchants State Bank of Argonia | Argonia | Kansas | October 13, 2017 | Conway Bank | 34.2 |
| 8 | Washington Federal Bank for Savings | Chicago | Illinois | December 15, 2017 | Royal Savings Bank | 144 |

== 2018 ==
No banks failed in 2018.

== 2019 ==
Four banks failed in 2019

| | Bank | City | State | Date | Acquired By | Assets ($mil.) |
|---|---|---|---|---|---|---|
| 1 | The Enloe State Bank | Cooper | Texas | May 31, 2019 | Legend Bank, N.A. | 36.7 |
| 2 | Louisa Community Bank | Louisa | Kentucky | October 25, 2019 | Kentucky Farmers Bank Corporation | 29.7 |
| 3 | Resolute Bank | Maumee | Ohio | October 25, 2019 | Buckeye State Bank | 27.1 |
| 4 | City National Bank of New Jersey (City National) | Newark | New Jersey | November 1, 2019 | Industrial Bank | 120.6 |

== 2020 ==
Four banks failed in 2020

| | Bank | City | State | Date | Acquired By | Assets ($mil.) |
|---|---|---|---|---|---|---|
| 1 | Ericson State Bank | Ericson | Nebraska | February 14, 2020 | Farmers and Merchants Bank | 100.9 |
| 2 | First State Bank of Barboursville | Barboursville | West Virginia | April 3, 2020 | MVB Bank Inc. | 152.4 |
| 3 | First City Bank of Florida | Fort Walton Beach | Florida | October 16, 2020 | United Fidelity Bank, fsb | 134.7 |
| 4 | Almena State Bank | Almena | Kansas | October 23, 2020 | Equity Bank | 70 |

== 2021 ==
No banks failed in 2021.

== 2022 ==
No banks failed in 2022.

== 2023 ==
Five banks failed in 2023. A sixth bank, Silvergate Bank, voluntarily wound down operations and liquidated.

| | Bank | City | State | Date | Acquired By | Assets ($mil.) |
|---|---|---|---|---|---|---|
| 1 | Silvergate Bank | San Diego | California | March 8, 2023 | None (Wound down voluntarily) | 16,000 |
| 2 | Silicon Valley Bank | Santa Clara | California | March 10, 2023 | First Citizens BancShares | 209,000 |
| 3 | Signature Bank | New York City | New York | March 12, 2023 | Flagstar Bank | 118,445 |
| 4 | First Republic Bank | San Francisco | California | May 1, 2023 | JPMorgan Chase | 229,000 |
| 5 | Heartland Tri-State Bank | Elkhart | Kansas | July 28, 2023 | Dream First Bank, National Association | 139 |
| 6 | Citizens Bank | Sac City | Iowa | November 3, 2023 | Iowa Trust & Savings Bank | 66 |

== 2024 ==
Two banks failed in 2024.

| | Bank | City | State | Date | Acquired by | Assets ($mil.) |
|---|---|---|---|---|---|---|
| 1 | Republic First Bancorp | Philadelphia | Pennsylvania | April 26, 2024 | Fulton Bank | 6,000 |
| 2 | The First National Bank of Lindsay | Lindsay | Oklahoma | October 18, 2024 | First Bank & Trust Company | 107.8 |

== 2025 ==
Two banks failed in 2025.

| | Bank | City | State | Date | Acquired by | Assets ($mil.) |
|---|---|---|---|---|---|---|
| 1 | Pulaski Savings Bank | Chicago | Illinois | January 17, 2025 | Millennium Bank | 49.5 |
| 2 | The Santa Anna National Bank | Santa Anna | Texas | June 27, 2025 | Coleman County State Bank | 63.8 |

== 2026 ==
As of October 17, 2026, six banks have failed in 2026.

| | Bank | City | State | Date | Acquired by | Assets ($mil.) |
|---|---|---|---|---|---|---|
| 1 | Metropolitan Capital Bank & Trust | Chicago | Illinois | January 30, 2026 | First Independence Bank | 261.1 |
| 2 | Community Bank & Trust - West Georgia | LaGrange | Georgia | May 1, 2026 | Anchor Bank | 288.2 |
| 3 | Kentland Federal Savings and Loan Association | Kentland | Indiana | July 10, 2026 | Kentland Bank | 3.73 |
| 4 | Small Business Bank | Lenexa | Kansas | July 17, 2026 | Farmers State Bank | 73 |
| 5 | Tioga-Franklin Savings Bank | Philadelphia | Pennsylvania | August 21, 2026 | Second Federal Savings and Loan Association | 68 |
| 6 | Nano Banc | Irvine | California | September 25, 2026 | Sunwest Bank Sandy, Utah | 690 |

== See also ==
- List of banks acquired or bankrupted during the Great Recession for a list of US banks and non-US banks
- List of largest bank failures in the United States
- Too big to fail
- List of stock market crashes and bear markets
