= List of banks acquired or bankrupted during the Great Recession =

This is a list of notable financial institutions worldwide that were severely affected by the Great Recession centered in 2007–2009. The list includes banks (including savings and loan associations, commercial banks and investment banks), building societies and insurance companies that were:

- taken over or merged with another financial institution;
- nationalised by a government or central bank; or
- declared insolvent or liquidated.

Announcement date	Acquired company	Acquirer	Type of company acquired	Value (USD, EUR and GBP)	Reference
January 3, 2007	(United States) Ownit Mortgage Solutions	Chapter 11 bankruptcy and liquidation	Mortgage lender		
January 29, 2007	(United States) American Freedom Mortgage	Chapter 11 bankruptcy and liquidation	Mortgage lender		
February 21, 2007	(Northern Cyprus) First Merchant Bank	withdrawal of the concession	Offshore bank		
April 2, 2007	(United States) New Century	Chapter 11 bankruptcy and liquidation	Mortgage lender		
August 6, 2007	(United States) American Home Mortgage	Chapter 11 bankruptcy and liquidation	Mortgage lender		
August 31, 2007	(United States) Ameriquest Mortgage	Chapter 11 bankruptcy and liquidation	Largest subprime mortgage lender		
September 28, 2007	(United States) NetBank	(Netherlands) ING Direct	Savings and loan association	$14,000,000	
October 9, 2007	(Netherlands) ABN AMRO	(United Kingdom) (Belgium) (Spain) Royal Bank of Scotland Fortis Grupo Santander	Diversified financial services	€7×10^{10}	
January 1, 2008 (became subsidiary)	(Germany) Landesbank Sachsen	(Germany) Landesbank Baden-Württemberg	Landesbank	€328,000,000	
February 22, 2008	(United Kingdom) Northern Rock	Government of the United Kingdom	Retail and mortgage bank		
April 1, 2008	(United States) Bear Stearns, New York City	(United States) JPMorgan Chase, New York City	Investment bank	$2.2×10^{9}	
June 7, 2008	(United Kingdom) Catholic Building Society	(United Kingdom) Chelsea Building Society	Building society	£51,000,000	
July 1, 2008	(United States) Countrywide Financial, Calabasas, California	(United States) Bank of America, Charlotte, North Carolina	Mortgage lender	$4×10^{9}	
July 14, 2008	(United Kingdom) Alliance & Leicester	(Spain) Grupo Santander	Retail and mortgage bank	£1.26×10^{9}	
August 26, 2008	(Denmark) Roskilde Bank	(Denmark) Danmarks Nationalbank (Danish Central Bank)	Retail bank	$896,800,000 (kr4,500,000,000)	
September 5, 2008	(United States) Silver State Bank	(United States) Federal Deposit Insurance Corporation	Commercial bank		
September 7, 2008	(United States) Fannie Mae and Freddie Mac	(United States) Federal Housing Finance Agency	Secondary mortgage market	$2×10^{11}	
September 8, 2008	(United Kingdom) Derbyshire Building Society	(United Kingdom) Nationwide Building Society	Building society	£7.1×10^{9}	
September 8, 2008	(United Kingdom) Cheshire Building Society	(United Kingdom) Nationwide Building Society	Building society	£4.9×10^{9}	
September 14, 2008	(United States) Merrill Lynch, New York City	(United States) Bank of America, Charlotte, North Carolina	Investment bank	$4.4×10^{10}	
September 16, 2008	(United States) American International Group, New York City	(United States) Federal government of the United States^{A}	Insurance company	$1.82×10^{11}	
September 17, 2008	(United States) Lehman Brothers, New York City ^{B}	(United Kingdom) Barclays	Investment bank	$1.3×10^{9}	
September 18, 2008	(United Kingdom) HBOS	(United Kingdom) Lloyds TSB	Diversified financial services	$2.185×10^{10}	
September 26, 2008	(United States) Washington Mutual, Seattle	(United States) JPMorgan Chase, New York City	Savings and loan association	$1.9×10^{9}	
September 26, 2008	(United States) Lehman Brothers^{C}	(Japan) Nomura Holdings	Investment bank	$600,000,000	
September 28, 2008	(United Kingdom) Bradford & Bingley^{D}	Government of the United Kingdom (Mortgage Assets) (Spain) Banco Santander (Savings Liabilities)	Diversified financial services	£612,000,000	
September 28, 2008	(Belgium) (Netherlands) (Luxembourg) Fortis	Government of the Netherlands (Dutch assets including ABN AMRO) (France) BNP Paribas (Belgian and Luxembourg assets)	Diversified financial services	€1.12×10^{10}	
September 30, 2008	(Belgium) Dexia	(Belgium) (France) The Belgian, French and Luxembourg governments	Public finance and retail		
October 3, 2008	(United States) Wachovia, Charlotte, North Carolina	(United States) Wells Fargo, San Francisco, California	Retail and investment banking	$1.5×10^{10}	
October 7, 2008	(Iceland) Landsbanki	(Iceland) Icelandic Financial Supervisory Authority	Commercial bank		
October 8, 2008	(Iceland) Glitnir	(Iceland) Icelandic Financial Supervisory Authority	Commercial bank		
October 9, 2008	(Iceland) Kaupthing Bank^{E}	(Iceland) Icelandic Financial Supervisory Authority (Netherlands) ING Direct United Kingdom	Commercial bank	€1.14×10^{9}	
October 9, 2008	(Australia) Bankwest (subsidiary of HBOS)	(Australia) Commonwealth Bank	Bank	£1.2×10^{9}	
October 13, 2008	(United States) Sovereign Bank, Wyomissing, Pennsylvania	(Spain) Banco Santander	Bank	$1.9×10^{9}	
October 13, 2008	(United Kingdom) Royal Bank of Scotland Group (up to 81.14% Bought)	Government of the United Kingdom	Bank	£2×10^{10}	
October 13, 2008	(United Kingdom) HBOS (up to 43.5% Bought)	Government of the United Kingdom	Bank	£1.3×10^{10}	
October 13, 2008	(United Kingdom) Lloyds TSB (up to 43.5% Bought)	Government of the United Kingdom	Bank	£4×10^{9}	
October 17, 2008	(Switzerland) UBS	Swiss National Bank and the Federal administration of Switzerland	Bank	$5.92×10^{10}	
October 22, 2008	(United Kingdom) Barnsley Building Society	(United Kingdom) Yorkshire Building Society	Building society	£376,000,000	
October 24, 2008	(United States) National City Bank, Cleveland, Ohio	(United States) PNC Financial Services, Pittsburgh, Pennsylvania	Bank	$5.58×10^{9}	
October 24, 2008	(United States) Commerce Bancorp, Cherry Hill, New Jersey	(Canada) Toronto-Dominion Bank, Toronto, Ontario	Bank	$8.5×10^{9}	
November 2, 2008	(Portugal) Banco Português de Negócios	Government of Portugal	Bank	€6.305×10^{9}	
November 4, 2008	(United Kingdom) Scarborough Building Society	(United Kingdom) Skipton Building Society	Building society		
November 8, 2008	(Latvia) Parex Bank (51% controlling interest)	Government of Latvia	Bank		
November 21, 2008	(United States) Downey Savings and Loan	(United States) US Bancorp	Savings and loan association		
November 2008	(United Kingdom) London Scottish Bank		Bank		
January 10, 2009	(United States) IndyMac	(United States) IMB Management Holdings	Savings and loan association	$1.39×10^{10}	
January 15, 2009	(Republic of Ireland) Anglo Irish Bank	(Republic of Ireland) Government of Ireland	Bank		
February 3, 2009	(Kazakhstan) BTA Bank	Government of Kazakhstan	Bank	$2.1×10^{9}	
February 3, 2009	(Kazakhstan) Alliance Bank	Government of Kazakhstan	Bank		
February 21, 2009	(Antigua and Barbuda) Bank of Antigua	(Caribbean Community) Eastern Caribbean Central Bank	Bank		
March 2, 2009	(United States) HSBC Finance	shutdown of US consumer lending	Consumer finance		
March 9, 2009	(Iceland) Straumur Investment Bank	(Iceland) Icelandic Financial Supervisory Authority	Investment bank		
March 9, 2009	(United Kingdom) Dunfermline Building Society	(United Kingdom) Bank of England (social housing loans) (United Kingdom) Nationwide Building Society (savings, residential mortgages, branch network)	Building society		
April 10, 2009	(United States) Cape Fear Bank	Chapter 11 bankruptcy and liquidation	financial company		
April 10, 2009	(United States) New Frontier Bank	Chapter 11 bankruptcy and liquidation	Bank		
April 17, 2009	(United States) American Sterling Bank	(United States) Metcalf Bank	Bank		
April 24, 2009	(United States) American Southern Bank	(United States) Georgia Department of Banking and Finance	Bank	$216,600,000	
May 8, 2009	Stanford Bank Venezuela	(Venezuela) Banco Nacional de Crédito	Bank	$111,000,000	
May 11, 2009	(Germany) Dresdner Bank	(Germany) Commerzbank	Bank		
May 22, 2009	Banco de Venezuela	Government of Venezuela	Universal bank	$1.05×10^{9}	
May 28, 2009	(Austria) Bank Medici	withdrawal of the concession	Bank		
August 14, 2009	(United States) Colonial Bank, Alabama	(United States) BB&T, North Carolina	Bank		
August 21, 2009	(United States) Guaranty Bank, Texas	(Spain) BBVA Compass, Alabama	Savings and loan association		
September 25, 2009	(United States) Colonial Bancgroup	Chapter 11 bankruptcy and liquidation	Bank holding company		
October 5, 2009	(Austria) Hypo Alpe Adria Bank	Government of Austria	Bank, Mortgage lender		
October 21, 2009	(Netherlands) DSB Bank		Bank, Insurance		
October 30, 2009	(United States) Cal National Bank	(United States) US Bancorp	Consumer and business bank		
December 4, 2009	(United States) AmTrust Bank	(United States) New York Community Bank	Bank		
December 14, 2009	(Germany) Hypo Real Estate	Government of Germany	Bank, Mortgage lender		
December 18, 2009	(United States) First Federal Bank of California	(United States) OneWest Bank, California	Savings and loan association	$5×10^{9}	
December 18, 2009	(Philippines) Philippine American Life and General Insurance Company	(Hong Kong) American International Assurance	Insurance company		
February 24, 2010	(United Kingdom) Chesham Building Society	(United Kingdom) Skipton Building Society	Building society	£230,000,000	
April 15, 2010	(Portugal) Banco Privado Português	Government of Portugal Bankruptcy and fraud	Bank	€41,000,000	
April 30, 2010	(United States) EuroBancshares	(United States) OFG Bancorp	Universal bank		
May 24, 2010	(Spain) CajaSur	(Spain) Banco de España	Savings and loan association	€550,000,000	
June 4, 2010	(United States) TierOne Bank	(United States) Federal Deposit Insurance Corporation	Commercial bank	$2.2×10^{9}	
November 8, 2010	(United States) Ambac	Chapter 11 bankruptcy and restructuring	Insurance company		
March 17, 2011	(Philippines) Banco Filipino	(Philippines) Philippine Deposit Insurance Corporation	Savings and loan association	$191,800,000 (₱8,400,000,000)	
September 30, 2011	(Spain) CatalunyaCaixa	Government of Spain	Savings and loan association		
October 31, 2011	(United States) MF Global	(United States) US Securities and Exchange Commission	Diversified financial services	$4.3×10^{10}	
November 23, 2011	(United States) PMI Group	(United States) State of Arizona	Insurance company		
April 27, 2012	(Philippines) Exportbank	(Philippines) Philippine Deposit Insurance Corporation	Commercial bank	$18,000,000 (₱750,000,000)	
May 25, 2012	(Spain) Bankia	Government of Spain	Savings and loan association	€1.9×10^{10}	
June 11, 2012	(United States) FGIC	(United States) New York State Insurance Department	Insurance company		
June 30, 2012	(Germany) Western German state Bank	(Germany) Portigon Financial Services (legal successor)	Landesbank		

== See also ==
- List of bank failures in the United States (2008–present)
- List of stock market crashes and bear markets
- Stock market crashes in India

== Notes ==
- ^AAcquired a nearly 80% share in exchange for a US$85 billion loan.
- ^BOnly trading assets, trading liabilities, and head offices were acquired.
- ^COnly European and Middle Eastern equities and investment banking operations were acquired.
- ^DGrupo Santander only acquired the savings portion of Bradford & Bingley; the company's loan portfolio was nationalised by the UK government.
- ^EThe Financial Supervisory Authority took control of the board of directors while Kaupthing Edge, its Internet bank, was taken over by ING Direct UK.
