= Sterling Bank =

Sterling Bank may refer to:

== Operating banks ==
- Sterling Bank of Asia, a bank based in the Philippines
- Sterling Bank (Nigeria), a bank based in Lagos

== Defunct banks ==
- American Sterling Bank, a bank that was based in Sugar Creek, Missouri
- Park Sterling Bank, a bank that was based in Charlotte, North Carolina
- Sterling Bank of Canada, a bank that was based in Toronto
- Sterling Bank (Texas), a bank that was based in Houston, Texas
- Sterling Financial Corporation, a bank that was based in Spokane, Washington
- Sterling Bancorp dba Sterling National Bank primarily in the state of New York and the Hudson valley
- Sterling Bank and Trust, a bank headquartered in Southfield, Michigan, with branches in California and New York, founded by Scott Seligman merged into Everbank in 2025
