= NBRS Financial Bank =

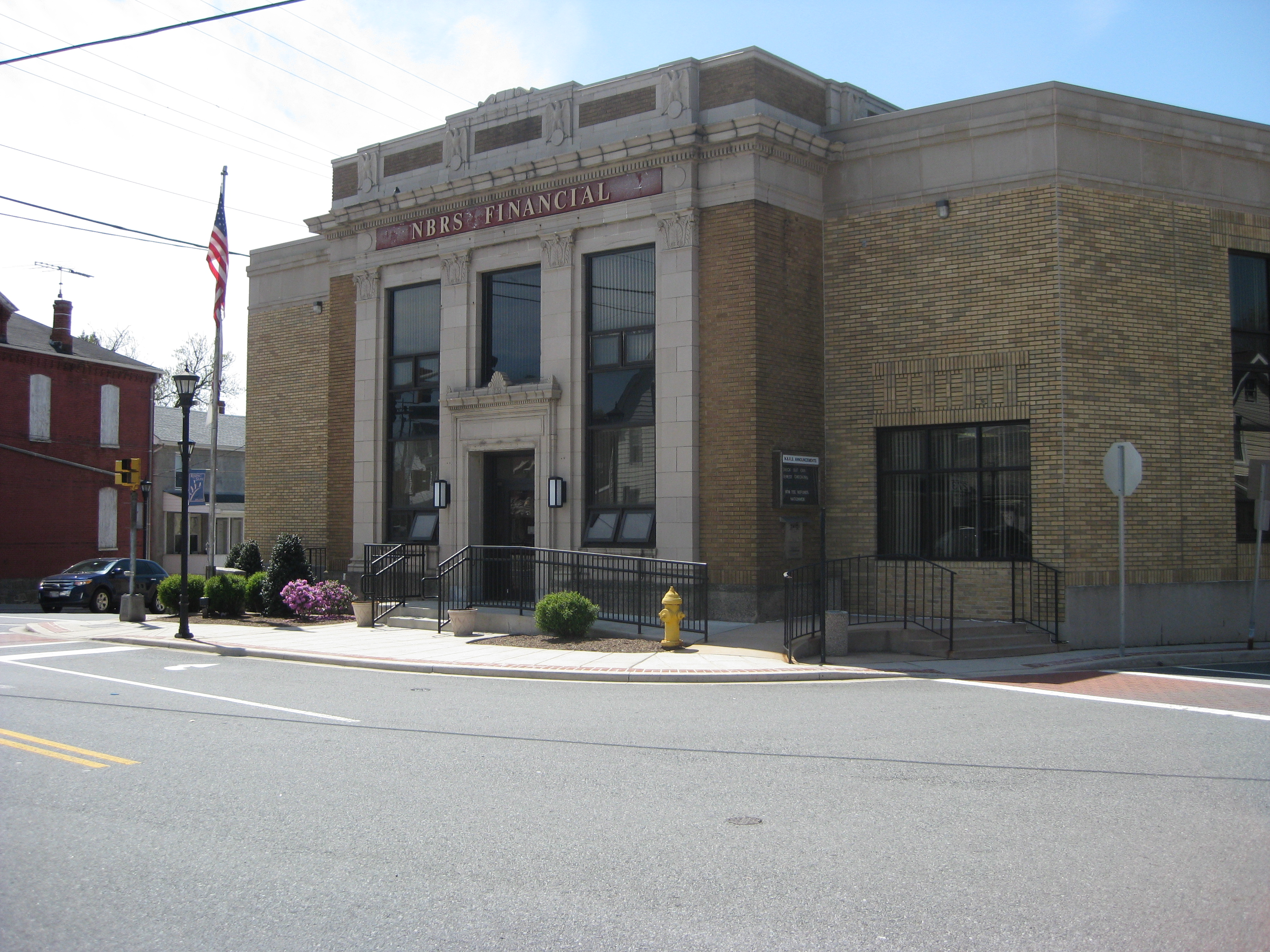
- Bank building on Main St in Rising Sun, Maryland from 2011
- Formerly: The Evans and Wood Bank, The National Bank of Rising Sun
- Type: Public company
- Industry: Financial services
- Founded: 1873
- Defunct: 2014
- Fate: Closed by regulators after having financial problems
- Headquarters: Rising Sun, Maryland, United States
- Area served: Maryland
- Products: Banking services
- Website: www.nbrs.com

NBRS Financial Bank was an American bank based in Maryland that operated between 1873 and 2014 when it was closed by state regulators.

== History ==
The bank was founded in 1873 as The Evans and Wood Bank. it was chartered as a national bank on July 1, 1880 under the name The National Bank of Rising Sun.

It became a state chartered bank in 2002, again changing its name to NBRS Financial (abbreviation of the bank's name). It opened branches in Aberdeen (12/28/2004), Elkton (6/3/2005), Havre De Grace (1/18/2000), Peach Bottom (10/3/1973), Rising Sun (7/1/1880), and Street (7/18/2003). As of June 30, 2014, they had 54 full-time employees at their six offices. During the bank's height, the Federal Deposit Insurance Corporation reports they had 75 full-time employees.

The bank got into financial trouble due to bad loans in the 2010s and was seized by regulators in 2014.
