= Nevada State Bank =

Regional bank in the state of Nevada, US

- Nevada State Bank headquarters in Clark County in 2026.
- Type: Division
- Industry: Finance
- Founded: 1959
- Headquarters: Las Vegas, Nevada, United States
- Key people: Terry Shirey, President and CEO
- Products: Checking accounts, savings accounts, loans, credit cards, mortgages, online banking, private banking, SBA and other business loans
- Number of employees: 480
- Parent: Zions Bancorporation

Nevada State Bank is an American bank in the state of Nevada that is one of several brands operated by Zions Bancorporation. It was founded in 1959 and acquired by Zions Bancorporation in 1985.

== History ==
Nevada State Bank first opened for business on December 9, 1959. The bank was organized by a group of 12 business owners, with Charles Lee Horsey Jr. serving as president. The organizing group sold 24,000 shares of stock to local people at $31.25 per share. This gave them $600,000 to put into capital and $150,000 for surplus and reserves. The bank received its official state charter on January 5, 1960. It operated out of one location in downtown Las Vegas until 1974, when it opened its first satellite branch.

1968 - Reddi Reserve account introduced, giving customers the ability to use a line of credit to cover overdrafts in their checking accounts.

1983 - Eight Docutel Automatic Teller Machines (ATMs) are purchased and installed. The “NSB Money Machine” card is introduced to customers.

1984 - The bank has a total of five branches and 269 employees.

1985 - Nevada State Bank is purchased by Zions Bancorporation and operates as an autonomous subsidiary.

1989 - Nevada State Bank opens the first supermarket bank branch in the state of Nevada.

July 1997 - It acquires five branches in rural Nevada towns: Eureka, Fernley, Tonopah, Lovelock and Wells.

October 1997 - Nevada State Bank purchases Sun State Bank, giving it three new branches in Southern Nevada.

1998 - Nevada State Bank introduces telephone, online and PC banking, offering clients the ability to bank 24 hours a day, seven days a week.

1999 - Nevada State Bank merges with Pioneer Citizens Bank of Nevada, founded in Reno in 1965. This adds six Northern Nevada branches and six Southern Nevada branches, effectively doubling the size of the bank.

2002 - Nevada State Bank introduces Internet bill pay, one of the first banks in the country to offer this service free of charge to non-business clients.

2004 - The bank introduces Reddi-Check, a service that creates images of cleared checks. Clients gain the ability to view images of cleared checks and deposit slips online.

2005 - Nevada State Bank is the first bank in the state to offer Remote Deposits, enabling companies to scan checks electronically, from anywhere at any time, instead of going to the bank.

January 2006 - The Nevada quarter is launched in a special ceremony on the steps of the Nevada Capitol, as part of the U.S. Mint’s 50 State Quarters Program. Nevada State Bank is the first bank to offer the quarter to the general public as the official “Bank of the Nevada Quarter Launch.”

September 2008 - Nevada State Bank is selected by the Federal Deposit Insurance Corporation (FDIC) to assume the insured deposits of Silver State Bank.

April 2009 - Nevada State Bank acquires the banking operations of Great Basin Bank of Nevada in a transaction facilitated by the FDIC.

August 2009 - Nevada State Bank is chosen to assist the FDIC by acting as Payout Agent in the resolution of Community Bank of Nevada, which was closed by the Nevada Financial Institutions Division.

2010 - NevadaSmallBusiness.com website launches, and Nevada State Bank joins social media with a Facebook page and Twitter account.

2011 - Nevada State Bank launches Mobile Banking and Bill Pay.

2011 - Nevada State Bank rolls out "Smart ATMs" that allow clients to deposit cash and checks without deposit slips or envelopes.

2014 - Nevada State Bank launches Mobile Deposit Capture, allowing clients to deposit checks by uploading images of the checks using a mobile phone app.

2014 - Nevada State Bank launches its annual Small Business Survey, with highly targeted, statewide research on business trends, opinions, and priorities.

December 31, 2015 - With the consolidation of Zions Bancorporation affiliates’ charters into a single charter, Nevada State Bank becomes a division of ZB, N.A., whose parent company is Zions Bancorporation.

January 2017

Terry Shirey is named president and CEO of Nevada State Bank; Dallas Haun remains as chairman.

September 30, 2018

At the end of the day on September 30, 2018, Zions Bancorporation merges with its wholly owned bank subsidiary, ZB, N.A. ZB, N.A. is the surviving entity in the merger and immediately thereafter changes its name to Zions Bancorporation, N.A. Zions Bancorporation, N.A. continues to operate through its locally managed bank divisions, including Nevada State Bank.
