= Cape Fear Bank =

- Industry: Finance
- Founded: 1998
- Defunct: 2009
- Fate: Closed by the North Carolina Office of Commissioner of Banks. Most of the deposits acquired by First Federal Savings and Loan Association of Charleston
- Headquarters: Wilmington, North Carolina, United States
- Products: retail banking, mortgage banking, and business finance
- Website: www.capefearbank.com

Cape Fear Bank, formerly named Bank of Wilmington (2006), was a Wilmington, North Carolina–based financial company engaged primarily in retail banking, mortgage banking, business finance and providing ATM and merchant processing services. The bank was established in June 1998 and Cape Fear Bank Corporation, the parent company, was formed in June 2005. The name change in October 2006 from Bank of Wilmington and Bank of Wilmington Corporation, respectively, reflected the growth of the Bank’s business in the Lower Cape Fear region of North Carolina. The Bank had full service banking offices serving New Hanover, Brunswick and Pender counties.

On April 10, 2009, regulators shut down Cape Fear Bank—the first North Carolina bank to collapse since 1993, and the 22nd U.S. bank to fail in 2009.

== See also ==
- Great Recession
- List of acquired or bankrupt banks in the Great Recession
