= Tompkins Financial Corporation =

American financial services company

Coordinates: 42.440644°N 76.498005°W

- Company type: Public
- Traded as: AMEX: TMP; S&P 600 component
- Industry: Financial services
- Founded: Ithaca, New York, U.S. (1836)
- Headquarters: Ithaca, New York, U.S., United States
- Area served: New York, Pennsylvania, U.S.
- Key people: Thomas R. Rochon (Chairman); Stephen S. Romaine (CEO)
- Products: Retail banking, corporate banking, insurance, asset management
- Revenue: ▲US$ 336.81 million (2019)
- Net income: ▼US$ 81.72 million (2019)
- Total assets: ▼US$ 6.726 billion (2019)
- Total equity: ▲US$ 661.6 million (2019)
- Number of employees: 1,048 (2019)
- Subsidiaries: Tompkins Trust Company Tompkins Mahopac Bank; Tompkins Bank of Castile; Tompkins VIST Bank; Tompkins Insurance Agencies; Tompkins Financial Advisors
- Website: www.tompkinsfinancial.com

Tompkins Financial Corporation is a small, diversified financial services company based in Ithaca, New York. It is the parent of the Tompkins Trust Company, as well as several other banks, an insurance agency, and a wealth management division.

== History ==
=== Founding ===
The bank traces its history to 1836, when the Tompkins County Bank was chartered by a special act of the New York State Assembly. After the National Bank Act of 1864, it was reorganized into the Tompkins County National Bank. In 1891, the Ithaca Trust Company was formed; in 1935, the two banks merged into the Tompkins County Trust Company. For many years the bank was associated with the locally-prominent Treman family; the last family member to be president, Charles E. Treman, Jr., served from 1960 to 1978. From 1978 to 1989, the bank was led by Raymond Van Houtte, a late opponent of the Glass–Steagall Act.

=== Expansion and 2008 financial crisis ===
Under the leadership of James J. Byrnes, CEO from 1989 to 2003, the Trust Company began to expand. In 1995 the bank created a holding company for itself, Tompkins Trustco, which was renamed in 2007 to Tompkins Financial. In 1996, the bank opened its first branch outside of Tompkins County, with the purchase of a small branch office in Odessa, New York. In 2000, it acquired the Bank of Castile in Western New York and Mahopac National Bank in the Hudson Valley. While most of the banks Tompkins Financial has acquired have kept their separate identities, in 2008 it paid $30.2 million for Sleepy Hollow Bank and merged its assets into Mahopac National Bank. In 2012, Tompkins Financial acquired VIST Bank in suburban Philadelphia, paying $109.1 million.

The company's expansion has not been limited to banks: in the mid-2000s, Tompkins Financial acquired a number of independent insurance agencies, merging them into the newly created Tompkins Insurance Agencies, and in 2006 acquired financial planning firm AM&M Financial Services (renamed in 2011 to Tompkins Financial Advisors).

After the 2008 financial crisis, Tompkins Financial was lauded for not issuing subprime mortgages or investing in securities backed by them. Tompkins Financial also declined to participate in the federal government's bank bailout in 2008. The company has also raised its dividend to shareholders every year since 1987.

=== 2010s ===
On August 1, 2013, Tompkins Financial announced that Byrnes, who had served as board chairman since the company's creation, would step down in 2014. He was succeeded by Ithaca College President Tom Rochon. In March 2014, Tompkins Financial announced that it was re-branding itself by adopting a new logo, and renaming its subsidiary banks to start with "Tompkins." Previously, all its acquired banks had retained their original names, keeping with Tompkins's promise of local control.

In April 2015, Tompkins Financial announced plans to build a new headquarters in downtown Ithaca, adjacent to its current headquarters on the Ithaca Commons. Currently nearly 300 corporate and back-office employees are spread throughout the Ithaca area; the seven-story, 110,000sqft building would bring them all under one roof. Construction began in June 2016, and was completed in the summer of 2018, at a total cost of $39 million.

== Acquisition History ==
- Tompkins Financial (created 1995 as Tompkins Trustco)
  - Tompkins County Trust Company
    - merged 1935
      - Tompkins County Bank
        (est. 1836)
      - Ithaca Trust Company
        (est. 1891)
    - acq. 1935
      First National Bank of Trumansburg
  - Bank of Castile
    (acq. 2000)
  - Mahopac National Bank
    (acq. 2000)
  - AM&M Financial Services
    (acq. 2006)
  - Sleepy Hollow Bank
    (acq. 2008)
  - VIST Bank
    (acq. 2012)
