= American Southern Bank =

- Industry: Finance
- Founded: 2005
- Defunct: 2009
- Headquarters: Kennesaw, Georgia, United States
- Products: retail banking, mortgage banking, and business finance
- Website: www.americansourthernbank.com

American Southern Bank was a financial company founded in 2005 and engaged primarily in retail banking, mortgage banking, business finance and providing ATM and merchant processing services. The bank had a full service banking office serving Roswell, Georgia.

== History ==
On April 24, 2009, Georgia Department of Banking and Finance shut down American Southern Bank, marking the 26th bank failure of 2009 in the United States, and the 51st since the beginning of the recession, as the credit crunch continued to spread through the economy. Bank of North Georgia of Alpharetta, Georgia, assumed all of the deposits. As of March 30, 2009, American Southern Bank had assets of about $112.3 million and total deposits of $104.3 million.
