= American Sterling Bank =

- Industry: Banking
- Founded: 1934; 92 years ago
- Defunct: April 17, 2009; 17 years ago
- Fate: Bank failure; assets acquired by First Citizens BancShares
- Headquarters: Sugar Creek, Missouri
- Area served: Missouri
- Total assets: $0.181 billion

American Sterling Bank was a bank based in Sugar Creek, Missouri. On April 17, 2009, the bank was closed by the Office of Thrift Supervision in a bank failure, and Metcalf Bank took over its deposits.

== History ==
The bank was established in 1934 as Bank of Levasy.

In 1963, it was renamed Sugar Creek National Bank.

In 1983, it was renamed Sterling National Bank.

In 1998, it was renamed American Sterling Bank.

On Friday, April 17, 2009, the bank was closed by the Office of Thrift Supervision, which named the Federal Deposit Insurance Corporation as receiver; Metcalf Bank of Lee's Summit, Missouri acquired all of its deposit accounts. The FDIC estimated the failure of American Sterling Bank would cost its deposit insurance fund $42 million.

In January 2010, the Federal Housing Administration began investigating loans made by the bank after loans from the bank incurred significantly high claims rates against the FHA’s mortgage insurance program.

In March 2010, the Office of Thrift Supervision issued an order against Michael Thompson, the former chief executive officer of the bank, and four of its board members prohibiting them from participating in the banking industry without prior regulatory approval. The agency found that Thompson “facilitated (American Sterling’s) recording of four fictitious capital contributions and its filing of inaccurate Thrift Financial Reports.”
