= Silver State Bank =

- Type: Private company
- Industry: Financial services
- Founded: 1996; 30 years ago in Las Vegas, Nevada, United States
- Defunct: September 5, 2008
- Fate: Close by regulators
- Successor: Zions Bancorporation
- Headquarters: Las Vegas, Nevada, United States
- Area served: Nevada and western United States
- Products: Banking services
- Website: Silver State Bank (Archive)

Silver State Bank was an American commercial bank based in Nevada that failed in 2008. The bank had 17 branches in the Las Vegas and Phoenix metropolitan areas and loan operations across the western United States. The bank's assets were acquired by Zions Bancorporation, a bank holding corporation with $2 billion in assets.

== History ==
Silver State Bank was a community bank founded in 1996 operating in the Las Vegas metropolitan area. On September 5, 2006, Silver State Bancorp, the bank's holding company, acquired Choice Bank in the Phoenix/Scottsdale region of Arizona, and merged operations in 2008.

== Failure ==
On September 5, 2008, the bank was closed by the Nevada Financial Institutions Division and placed under Federal Deposit Insurance Corporation (FDIC) receivership. Nonbrokered FDIC-insured accounts in Nevada were transferred to Nevada State Bank, while those in Arizona were transferred to National Bank of Arizona, both of which are operating subsidiaries of Zions Bancorporation. The bank was the 11th insured commercial bank to fail in 2008, compared to three in all of 2007. An estimated $450 to $550 million in losses are expected to be covered by the FDIC Deposit Insurance Fund. Some customers, who did not understand FDIC insurance limits, sustained losses of deposits they believed safe. Uninsured deposited amounted to $20 million in 500 accounts.

The underlying cause of failure was overexposure to risky real estate loans, especially mortgages on undeveloped land purchased for home construction that was no longer viable following the collapse of the housing bubble. In January 2009, Silver State Bancorp filed for Chapter 11 bankruptcy protection.

== Andrew McCain ==
The Wall Street Journal reported that Andrew McCain, son of Republican presidential candidate John McCain, sat on the board of Silver State Bank for five months in 2008, resigning on July 26 for "personal reasons," shortly before he would have had to sign off on second-quarter audit statements.
