= Government of Georgia (U.S. state) =

Overview of the government of the U.S. state of Georgia

- Logo and digital seal the government of Georgia Great Seal of the State of Georgia
- Part of: United States of America
- Constitution: Constitution of Georgia

Legislative branch
- Name: Georgia General Assembly
- Type: Bicameral
- Meeting place: Georgia State Capitol
- Upper house
- Name: Senate
- Presiding officer: Burt Jones, President
- Lower house
- Name: House of Representatives
- Presiding officer: Jon G. Burns, Speaker

Executive branch
- Head of state and government
- Title: Governor
- Currently: Brian Kemp
- Appointer: Election
- Cabinet
- Leader: Governor
- Deputy leader: Lieutenant Governor
- Headquarters: Georgia State Capitol

Judicial branch
- Name: Judiciary of Georgia
- Courts: Courts of Georgia
- Supreme Court of Georgia
- Chief judge: Nels S. D. Peterson
- Seat: Atlanta

The state government of Georgia is the U.S. state governmental body established by the Georgia State Constitution. It is a republican form of government with three branches: the legislature, executive, and judiciary. Through a system of separation of powers or "checks and balances", each of these branches has some authority to act on its own, some authority to regulate the other two branches, and has some of its own authority, in turn, regulated by the other branches. The seat of government for Georgia is located in Atlanta.

== Executive ==
The current statewide elected officials are as follows:

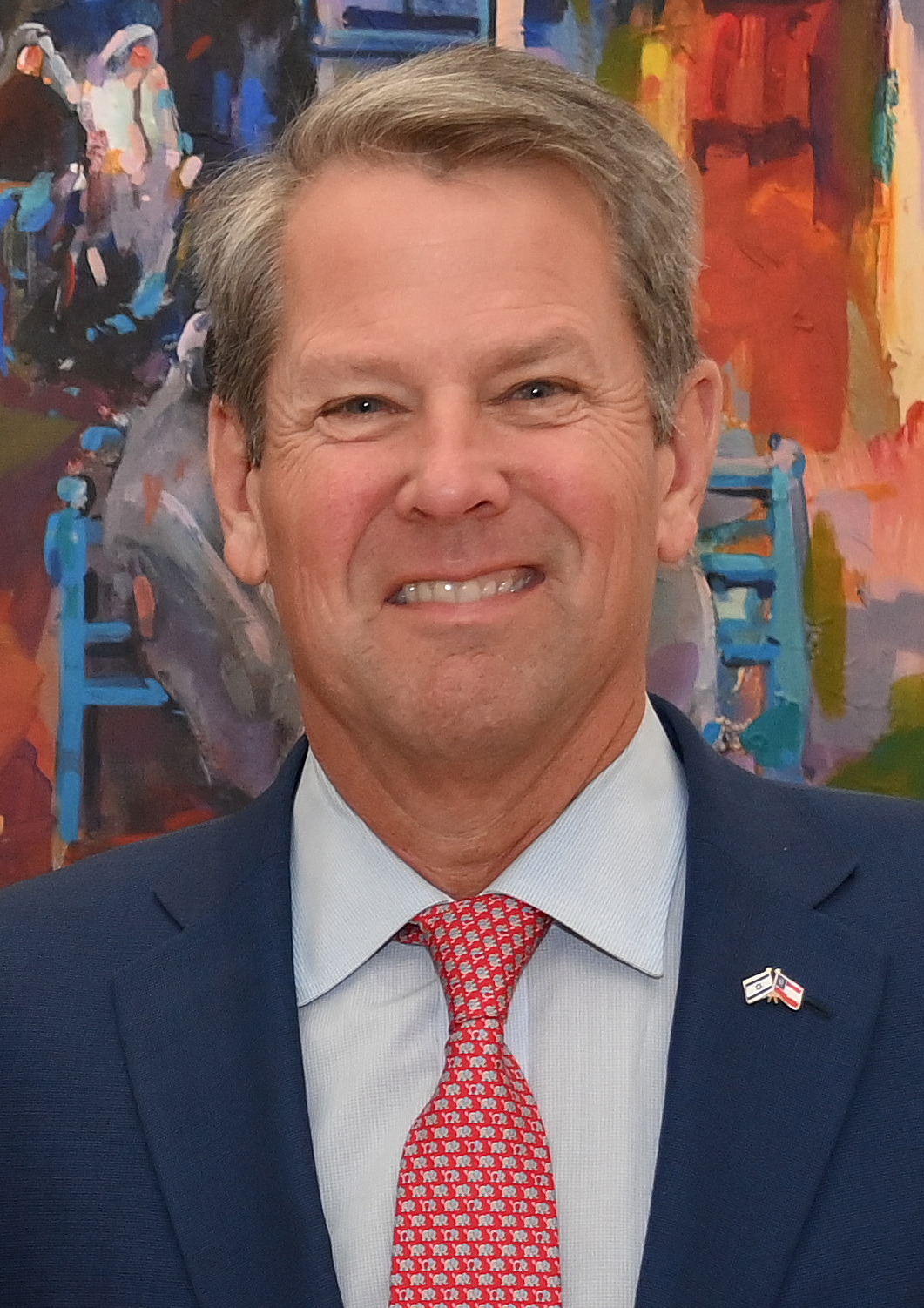
Brian Kemp (R)
Governor

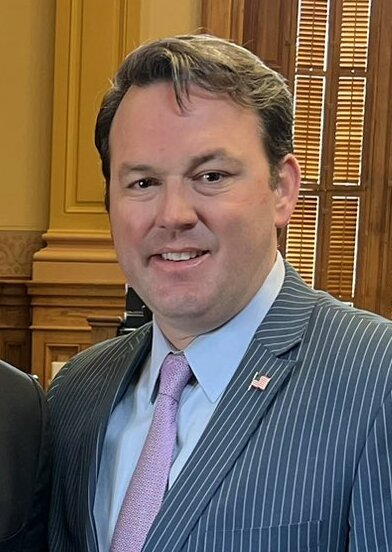
Burt Jones (R)
Lieutenant Governor

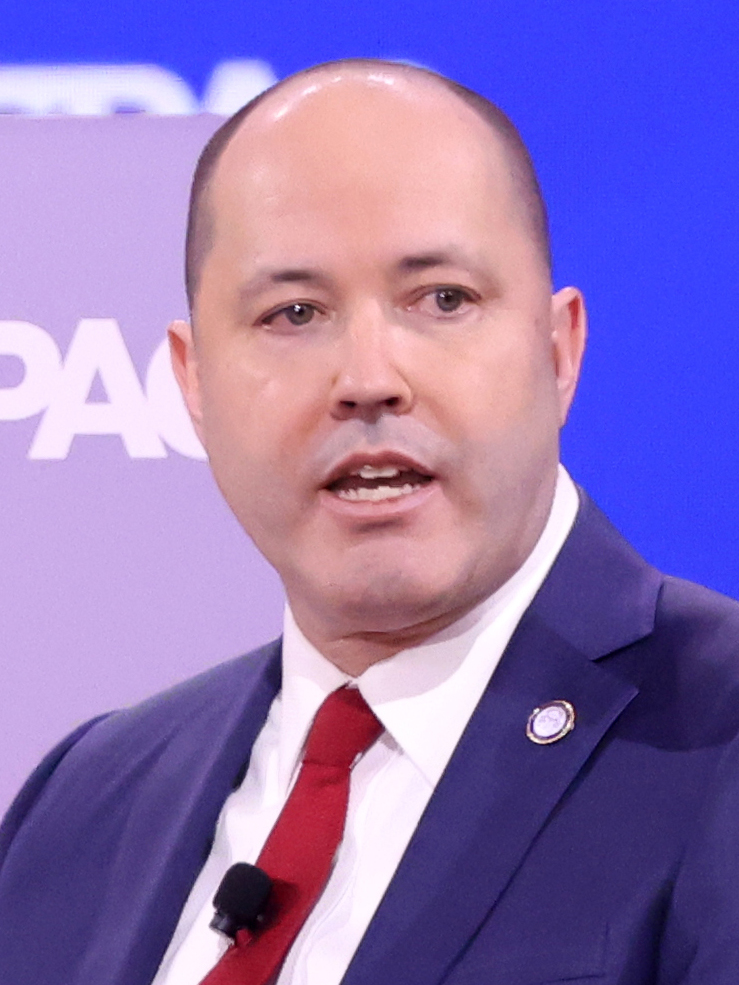
Chris Carr (R)
Attorney General

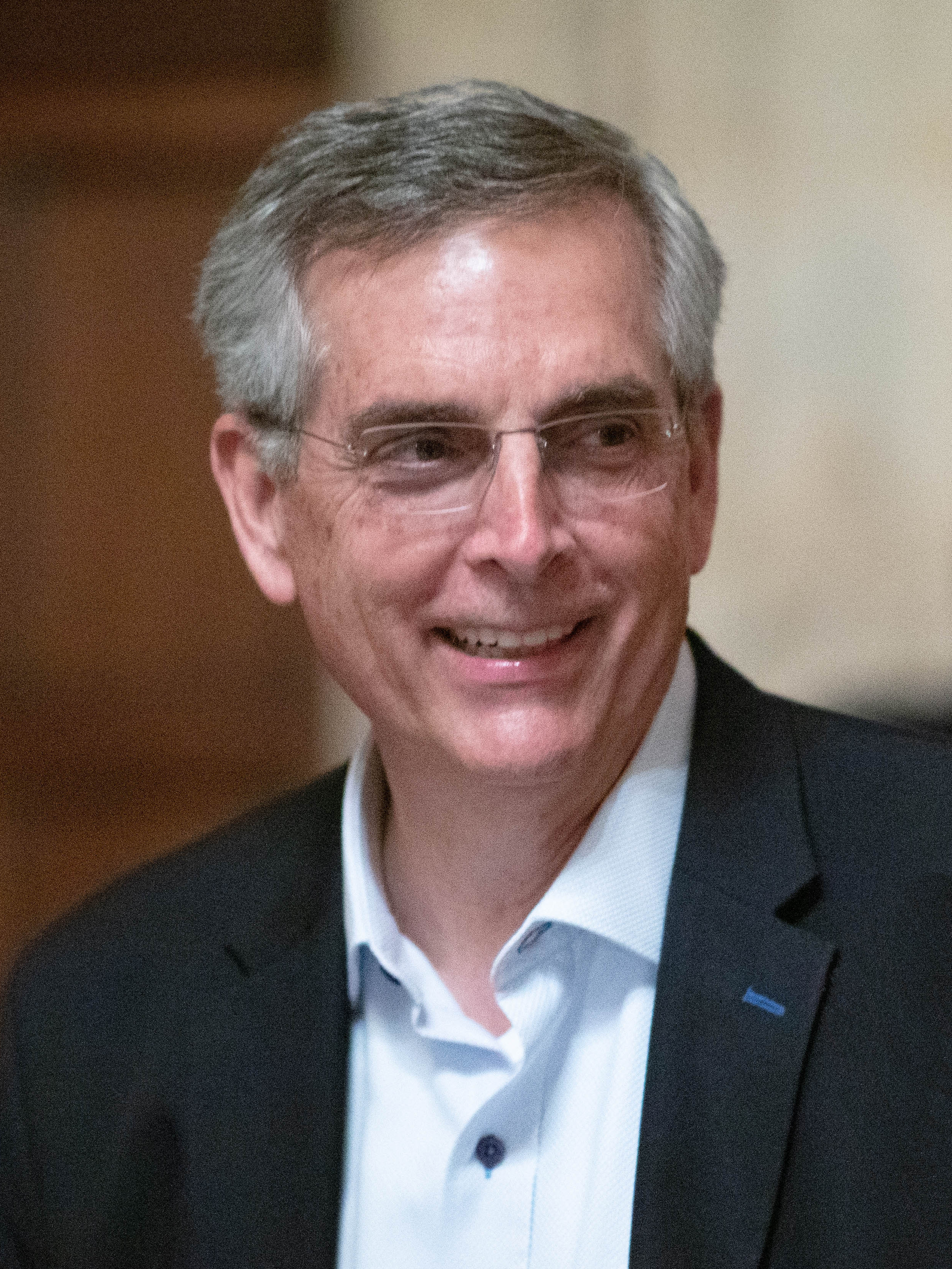
Brad Raffensperger (R)
Secretary of State

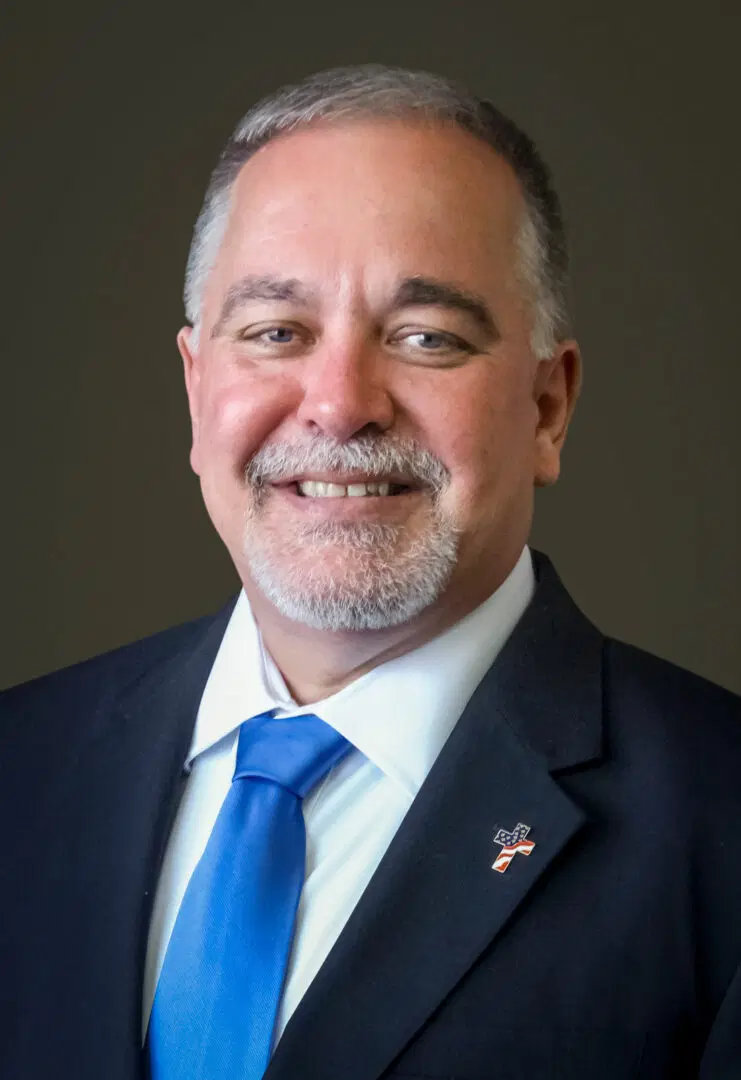
Richard Woods (R)
State School Superintendent

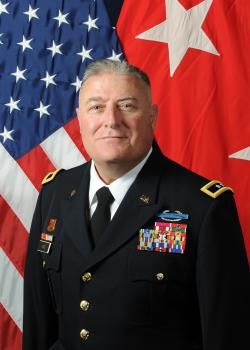
John King (R)
Insurance Commissioner

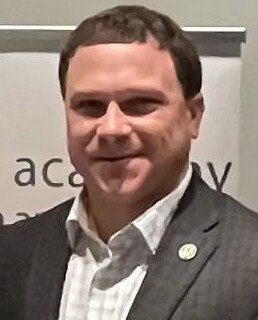
Tyler Harper (R)
Agriculture Commissioner

Bárbara Rivera Holmes (R)
Labor Commissioner

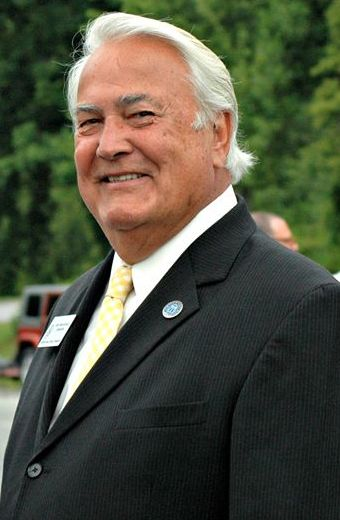
Bubba McDonald (R)
Public Service Commission
District 4

Alicia Johnson (D)
Public Service Commission Vice-chairman
District 2

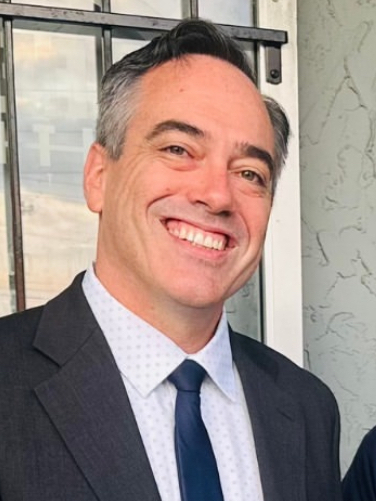
Peter Hubbard (D)
Public Service Commissioner
District 3

Tricia Pridemore (R)
Public Service Commissioner Chairman
District 5

Jason Shaw (R)
Public Service Commissioner
District 1

The main executive official in Georgia is the Governor. They are elected by the voters of the state for a term of four years. No person may hold the office more than twice consecutively. The governor oversees the state budget and thus possesses great power over all state finances. Additionally, the governor is responsible for the nomination of over a thousand officials to a variety of positions in state government, one of the largest rosters of any U.S. state. Those nominated must be approved by the state legislature. Regulations are codified in the Rules and Regulations of the State of Georgia.

In addition, there are three other state executive nonpartisan offices:

Office	Incumbent	Appointment
Georgia State Auditor	Greg Griffin	appointed by joint resolution of the General Assembly
Georgia State Treasurer	Steve McCoy	appointed by the State Depository Board
Georgia Commissioner of Natural Resources	Walter Rabon	Nominated by the Georgia Board of Natural Resources, appointed by the Governor

=== Agencies ===
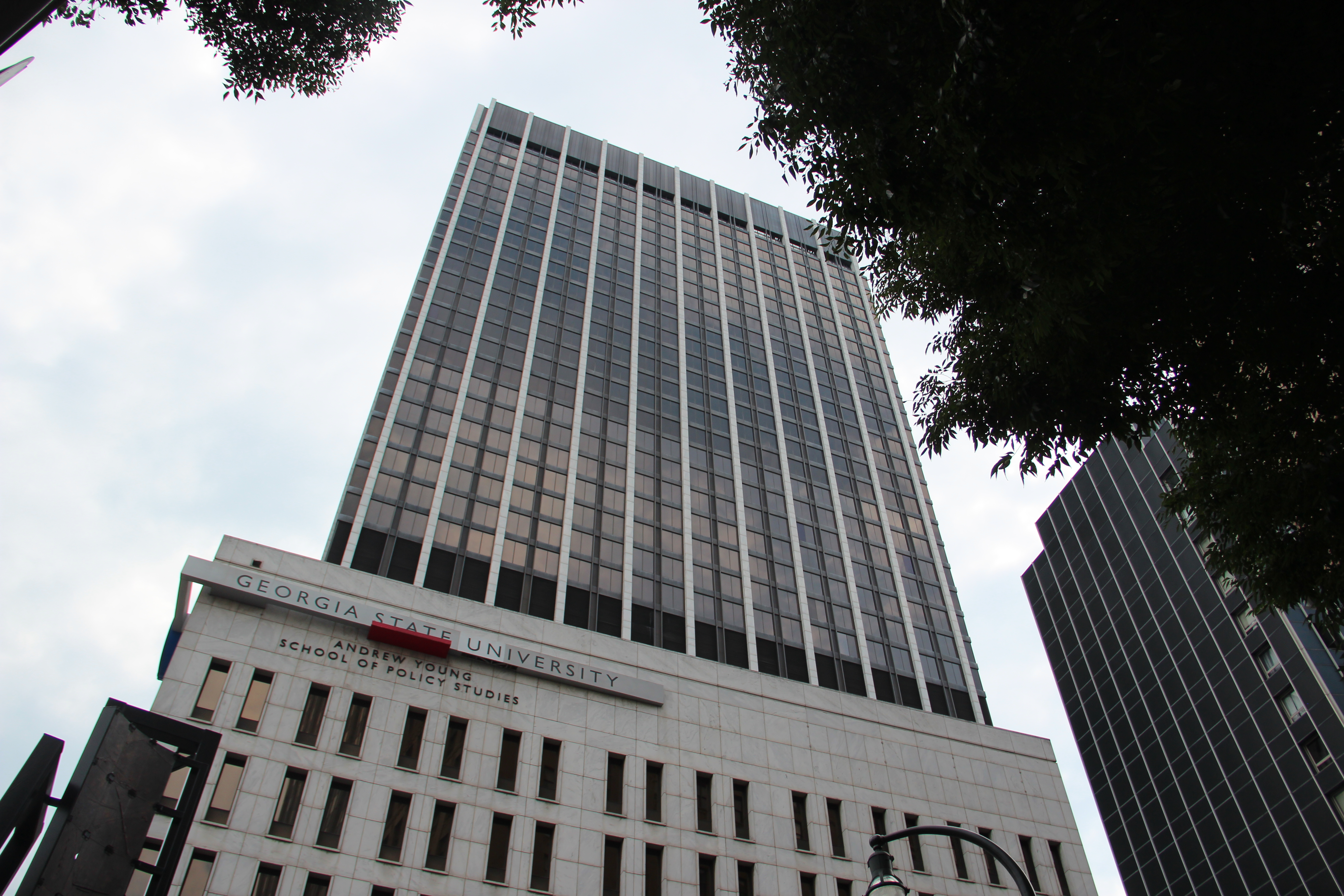
The Department of Human Services building in Atlanta

There are several departments, agencies and other entities within the government, including the:

- Georgia Department of Administrative Services
- Georgia Department of Agriculture
- Georgia Agricultural Development Authority
- Georgia Department of Audits and Accounts
- Georgia Department of Banking and Finance
- Georgia Department of Behavioral Health and Developmental Disabilities
- Georgia Bureau of Investigation
- Georgia Department of Community Affairs
- Georgia Department of Community Health
- Georgia Department of Community Supervision
- Georgia Department of Corrections
- Georgia Department of Defense
- Georgia Department of Driver Services
- Georgia Department of Early Care and Learning
- Georgia Department of Economic Development
- Georgia Department of Education
- Georgia Emergency Management and Homeland Security Agency
- Georgia Department of Human Services
- Georgia Office of Insurance and Safety Fire Commissioner
- Georgia Department of Juvenile Justice
- Georgia Department of Labor
- Georgia Lottery Corporation
- Georgia Department of Natural Resources
- Georgia State Board of Pardons and Paroles
- Georgia Ports Authority
- Georgia Department of Public Health
- Georgia Department of Public Safety
- Georgia Public Service Commission
- Georgia Department of Revenue
- Georgia State Accounting Office
- State Road and Tollway Authority
- Georgia Technology Authority
- Georgia Transportation Efficiency Authority
- Georgia Department of Transportation
- Georgia Department of Veterans Service

== Legislature ==
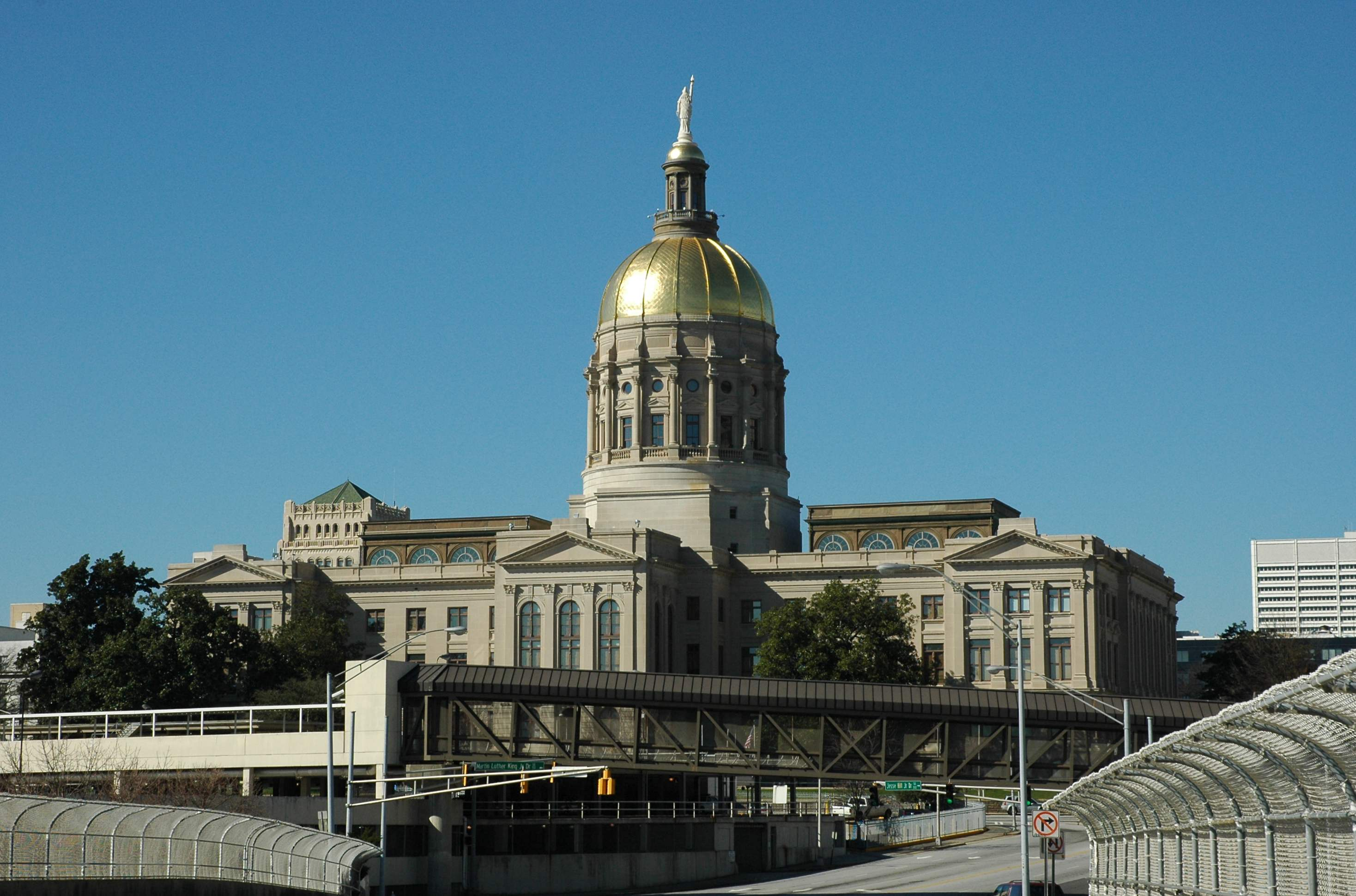
The Georgia State Capitol, housing the offices of the Governor and the halls of the General Assembly

The legislature of Georgia is the General Assembly, a bicameral body consisting of the Senate and the House of Representatives. The Senate has 56 members and the House has 180 members. Lawmakers serve 2-year terms and work part-time. Each member of the legislature represents geographically distinct districts from which each voter may give support to one candidate for each body. For most of its history, the state used an unusual county unit system by which districts were drawn such that each had the same area. However, population growth in cities across the state led to the rural population, which was in relative decline, having disproportionate power in government. After the U.S. Supreme Court declared such unequal representation to be unconstitutional in Gray v. Sanders in 1963, state officials began to redefine legislative districts so that each had a similarly sized population. Both senators and representatives have terms of two years. There are no limits on the number of terms any person may serve. Its legislative acts, generically called "chapter laws" or "slip laws" when printed separately, are published in the official Georgia Laws and are called "session laws". These in turn have been codified in the Official Code of Georgia Annotated (O.C.G.A.).

=== From bill to law ===
The General Assembly transforms bills into laws. A bill is created after citizens contact their representatives about an issue they care about. The legislator drafts a bill that addresses the concerns of citizens. The lawmaker sponsors the bill and files it with either the Clerk of the House or Secretary of Senate to be registered, introduced, and assigned to a committee for review. While in committee, public testimonies and commentary are presented to the committee. After studying the bill, the committee will recommend one of the following: to pass, not pass, pass with changes, or hold bill during its second reading. The bill will proceed to its third reading if viewed favorably by the committee. Bills will be called to the floor for the first ten days of a session. After the tenth day, the Rules Committee starts prioritizing bills to be called. The Rules Committee prepares which bills will be called to the floor on the next day. Once on the floor, the General Assembly may vote and/or make amendments. The bill requires a majority vote to pass through the chamber it originated from by Crossover Day, which is the 30th day in session. Bills that do not advance to the other chamber by this day will not be considered for the remainder of the session. Both the House and Senate follow these rules before sending it to the other house for review. The bills continues to be amendment until both sides can agree on the same version of the bill. Once this is reached, the bill is sent to the governor to be enacted or vetoed, which in the latter case will require a 2/3 majority vote from both houses to overcome the veto. The bill is usually sent to the governor after sine die, the last day of the legislative session. The governor has 40 days to approve or veto the bill after sine die before it is automatically enacted. If the bill is requested to arrive at the governor's desk earlier than sine die, the governor must sign. If the bill is sent to the governor during the session, the governor has six days to sign before the bill becomes a law. The law is enacted on July 1.

== Judiciary ==
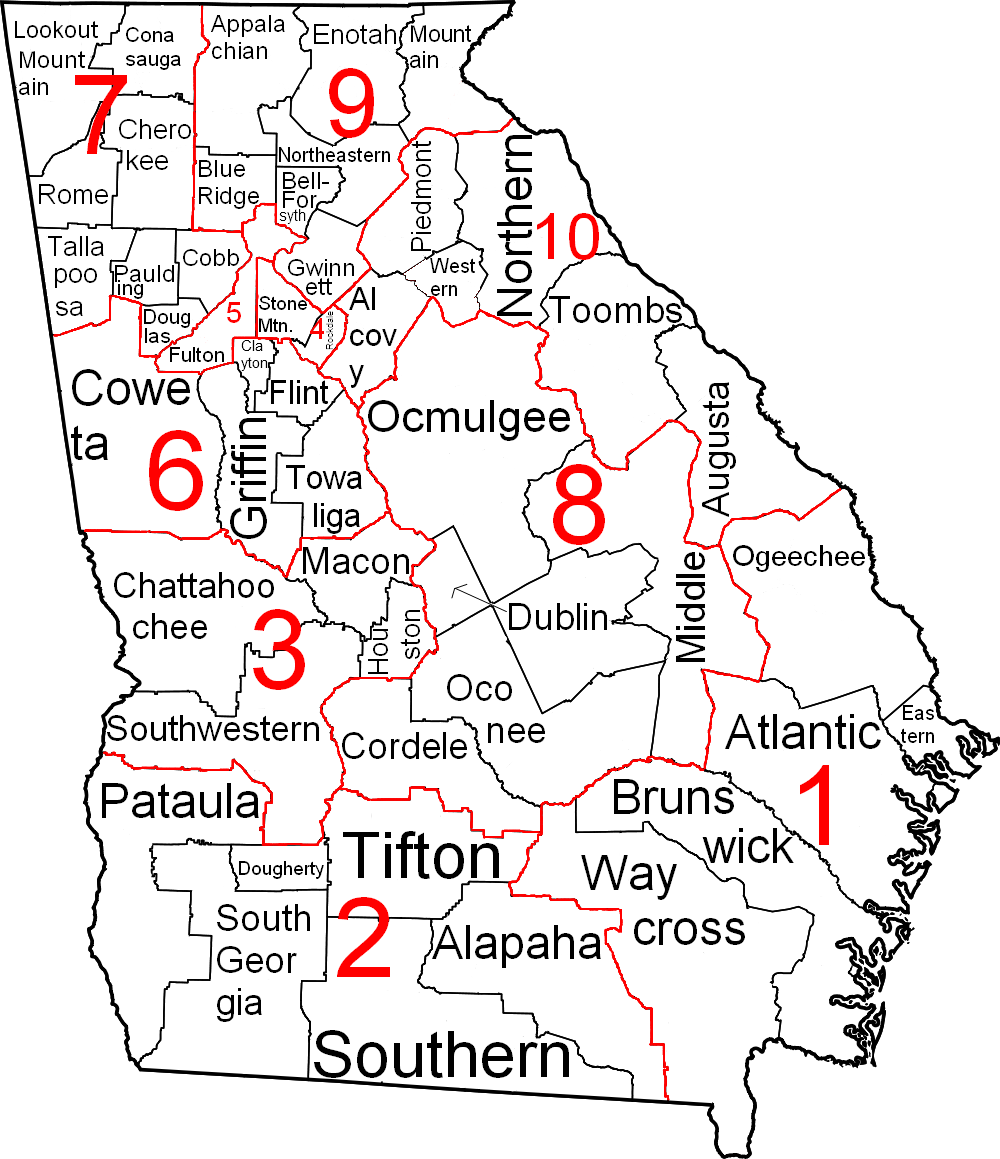
Map of Georgia judicial districts and circuits

The highest judiciary power in Georgia is the Supreme Court, which is composed of nine judges. The state also has a Court of Appeals made of 12 judges. Georgia is divided into 49 judicial circuits, each of which has a Superior Court consisting of local judges numbering between two and 19 depending on the circuit population. Under the 1983 Constitution, Georgia also has magistrate courts, probate courts, juvenile courts, state courts; the General Assembly may also authorize municipal courts. Other courts, including county recorder's courts, civil courts and other agencies in existence on June 30, 1983, may continue with the same jurisdiction until otherwise provided by law.

Each county in Georgia has at least one superior court, magistrate court, probate court, and where needed a state court and a juvenile court; in the absence of a state court or a juvenile court, the superior court exercises that jurisdiction.

All serving judges are elected by popular vote either from the entire state in the cases of the Supreme Court and the Court of Appeals or from a given circuit in the case of Superior Courts. Judges of the Supreme Court and the Court of Appeals serve for terms of six years. Judges of other courts serve for terms of four years.

== Local government ==
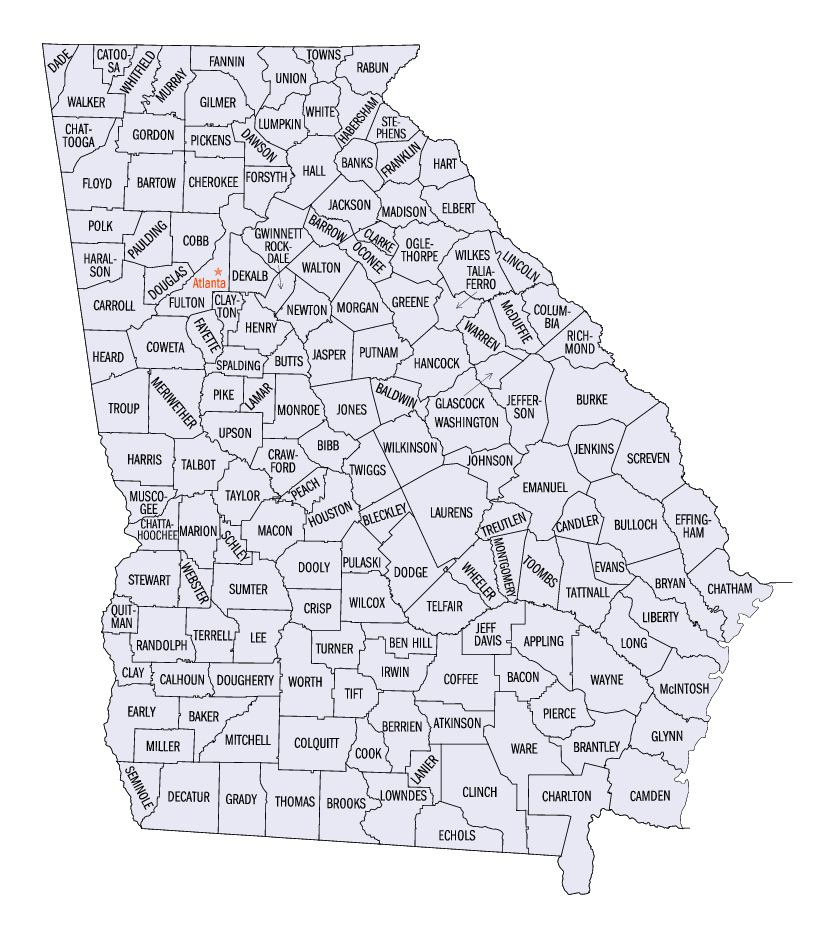
Map of Georgia counties

The Georgia Constitution grants cities and counties a significant amount of home rule authority.

=== Counties ===
Georgia is divided into 159 counties, more than any other U.S. state except Texas. Among all counties, 149 of them are governed by a committee made of between three and eleven commissioners. The other 10 counties are overseen by a single commissioner. All commissioners are elected by the voters of their county for terms that range between two and six years with most counties having terms lasting four years. Serving members wield both executive and legislative power in their county.

=== Cities ===
Most of the 536 cities in Georgia are governed by a mayor–council system. All municipalities in the state are considered cities. Most basic public services rendered outside of the cities are provided by the counties.

== See also ==
- Elections in Georgia (U.S. state)
- Politics of Georgia (U.S. state)
- Law of Georgia (U.S. state)
- List of state government committees of Georgia (U.S. state)
