= Vehicle registration plates of Georgia (U.S. state) =

Georgia vehicle license plates

Georgia
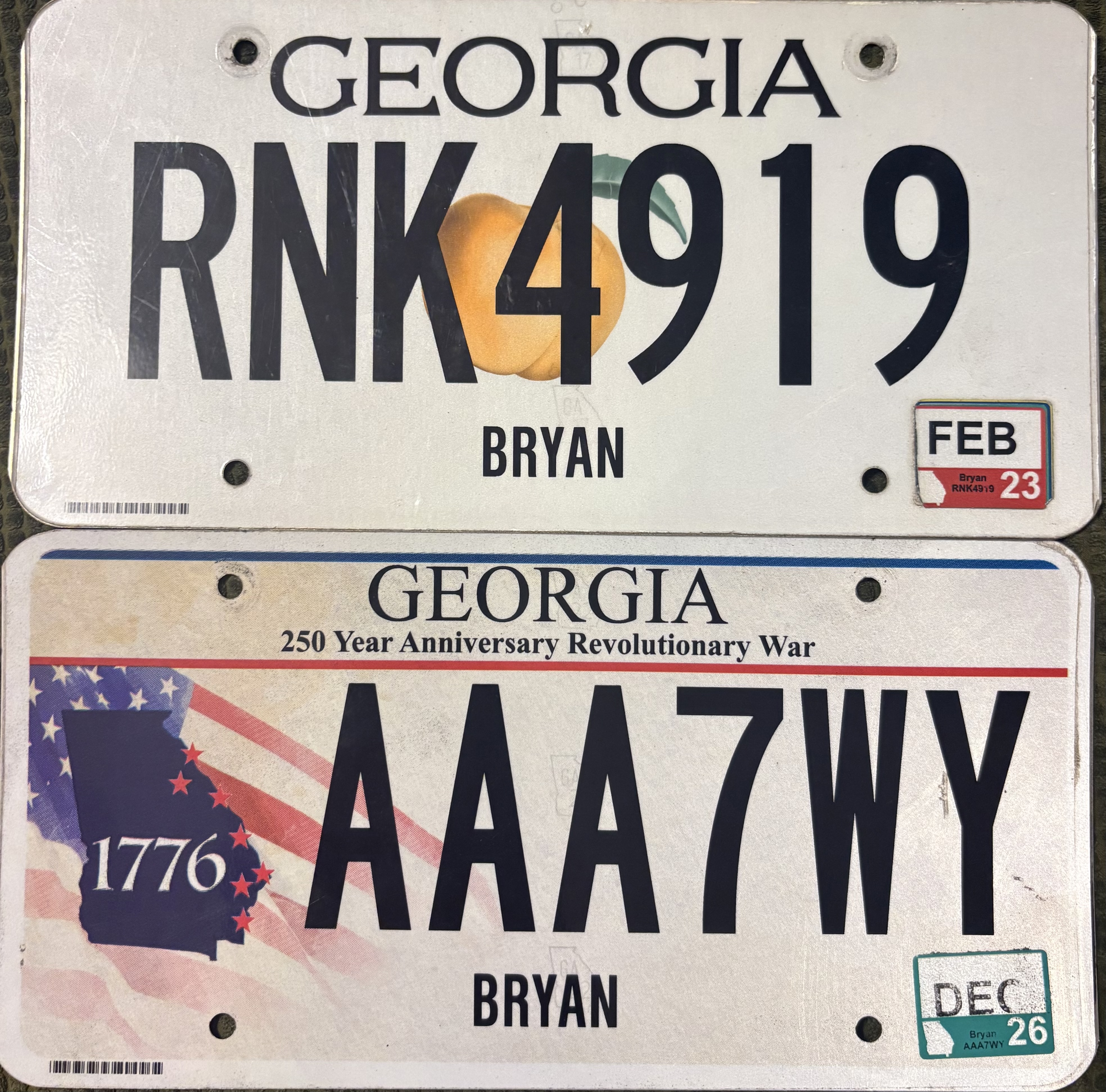
- Georgia’s two current available designs for standard plates

Current series
- Slogan: 250 Year Anniversary Revolutionary War (alternate)
- Size: 12 in × 6 in 30 cm × 15 cm
- Material: Aluminum
- Serial format: ABC1234 (Standard base); ABC1DE; AB1CDE (250 Years base)
- Introduced: May 2012 (Standard base); January 2026 (250 Years base)

Availability
- Issued by: Georgia Department of Revenue, Motor Vehicle Division

History
- First issued: September 1, 1910

The U.S. state of Georgia first required its residents to register their motor vehicles and display license plates in 1910. As of 2026, plates are issued by the Georgia Department of Revenue through its Motor Vehicle Division. Only rear plates have been required since 1942.

== Passenger baseplates ==
=== 1910 to 1970 ===
In 1956, the United States, Canada, and Mexico came to an agreement with the American Association of Motor Vehicle Administrators, the Automobile Manufacturers Association and the National Safety Council that standardized the size for license plates for vehicles (except those for motorcycles) at 6 inches (15 cm) in height by 12 inches (30 cm) in width, with standardized mounting holes. The 1956 (dated 1957) issue was the first Georgia license plate that fully complied with these standards: the 1954 (dated 1955) and 1955 (dated 1956) issues were 6 inches in height by 12 inches in width, but had non-standard mounting holes.

Image	Dates issued	Design	Slogan	Serial format	Serials issued	Notes
	1910–11	Black on aluminum	none	12345	1 to 10000	
	1911–12	Black on yellow	none	12345	10001 to 17000	
	1912–13	Black on white; vertical "GA" at right	none	12345	17001 to approximately 23600	
	1914	Black on white with border line; "GA 1914" at right	none	12345	1 to approximately 20600	First dated plate; replaced all 1910–13 plates.
	1915	White on black porcelain with border line; "GA. 1915" at right	none	12345	1 to approximately 25300	
	1916	Black on white with border line; "GA 16" at right	none	12345	1 to approximately 47500	
	1917	White on black with border line; "GA 1917" at right	none	12345	1 to approximately 67500	
	1918	Black on light green with border line; "GA 1918" at right	none	12345	1 to approximately 95500	
	1919	Black on white with border line; "GA 1919" at right	none	123456	1 to approximately 118500	
	1920	White on dark green with border line; "GA 20" at right	none	123-456	1 to approximately 145–000	
	1921	Dark green on white with border line; "GA 21" at right	none	123-456	1 to approximately 133–000	
	1922	White on black with border line; "GA 22" at right	none	123-456	1 to approximately 151–000	
	1923	White on brown with border line; "GA 23" at left	none	123-456	1 to approximately 151–000	
	1924	Black on gray with border line; "GA. 1924" at bottom	none	123-456	1 to approximately 178–000	
	1925	White on dark blue with border line; "GA. 25" at top	none	123-456	1 to approximately 221–000	
	1926	White on red with border line; "GA. 1926" at bottom	none	123-456	1 to approximately 243–000	
	1927	Black on yellow with border line; vertical "GA-27" as separator	none	123-456	1 to approximately 265–000	
	1928	White on dark blue with border line; "GA. 1928" at bottom	none	123-456	1 to approximately 294–000	
	1929	Golden yellow on black with border line; vertical "GA-29" as separator; vertical "FRONT" or "REAR" at right	none	123-456A	1A to approximately 316-000D (see right)	Front and rear plates issued; this practice continued through 1941. First use of weight classes, with the letters A, B, C and D used in order from the heaviest vehicles to the lightest, and a block of serials assigned to each class.
	1930	Black on gray with border line; "GEORGIA–1930" at top	none	123-456A	1A to approximately 349-000D (see right)	First use of the full state name. Weight class letters and method of assigning serials to each class same as 1929.
	1931	White on dark green with border line; "GA–31" at top	none	A1234; 1A234	A1 to Z9999; 0A1 to 9Z999	Four weight classes as in 1929 and 1930; separate blocks of serials for regular and locking-bar plates assigned to each class.
	1931	White on dark green with border line; "GA" at top left, "31" at top right and space for locking bar at top middle	none	A1234; 1A234	A1 to Z9999; 0A1 to 9Z999	Four weight classes as in 1929 and 1930; separate blocks of serials for regular and locking-bar plates assigned to each class.
	1932	White on dark blue with border line; "GA–32" at top	none	12345A	Coded by weight class (A)	Letters A, B, C and D used in order from the heaviest vehicles to the lightest, as in 1929 and 1930, but with serials in each class starting from 1. Letter E added for the lightest class when 99999D was reached. These practices continued through 1935.
	1933	Dark blue on orange with border line; "GA–33" at top	none	12-345A	Coded by weight class (A)	
	1934	Orange on dark blue with border line; "GEORGIA" and "1934" at top and bottom respectively	none	12-345A	Coded by weight class (A)	
	1935	Dark blue on orange with border line; "1935" and "GEORGIA" at top and bottom respectively	none	12-345A	Coded by weight class (A)	
	1936	As 1934 base, but with "1936" at bottom	none	123-456	1 to approximately 331–000	
	1937	As 1935 base, but with "1937" at top	none	123-456	1 to approximately 364–000	
	1938	As 1934 base, but with "1938" at bottom	none	12-345A	Coded by weight class (A)	
	1939	Dark blue on yellow with border line; "1939" and "GEORGIA" at top and bottom respectively	none	12-345A	Coded by weight class (A)	
	1940	Orange on green with border line; "GA", peach graphic and "40" at bottom	"PEACH STATE" at top	A12-345	Coded by weight class (A)	
	1940	As above, but with "GA 40" at top and no peach graphic	"PEACH STATE" at bottom	A12-345	Coded by weight class (A)	
	1941	Reflective yellow on dark blue with border line; peach sticker in the center; "GA 41" at top	"PEACH STATE" at bottom	123-45A; 123-4EX	Coded by weight class (A)	First reflectorized passenger plate in the United States, and also the first to use a sticker of any kind.
	1942–43	White on dark blue with red border line; "1942" and "GEORGIA" in red at top at bottom respectively	none	A12-345; EX12345	Coded by weight class (A)	Revalidated for 1943 with red tabs, due to metal conservation for World War II.
	1944	Yellow on black with border line; "GA 44" at left	none	A 12345; EX 12345	Coded by weight class (A)	
	1945	White on black with border line; "1945" and "GEORGIA" at top and bottom respectively	none	A-12345	Coded by weight class (A)	
	1946	Black on silver with border line; "1946" and "GEORGIA" at top and bottom respectively	none	A-12345; E/X-12345	Coded by weight class (A)	
	1947	Maroon on cream with border line; "GA 47" at top	"PEACH STATE" at bottom	A-12345; E/X-12345	Coded by weight class (A)	
	1948	Black on unpainted aluminum with border line; "GA 48" at top	"PEACH STATE" at bottom	A-12345; E/X-12345; E/S-12345	Coded by weight class (A)	
	1949	Red on unpainted aluminum with border line; "GA 49" at top	"PEACH STATE" at bottom	A-12345; E/X-12345; E/S-12345	Coded by weight class (A)	
	1950	Black on unpainted aluminum with border line; "GA 50" at top	"PEACH STATE" at bottom	A-12345; E/X-12345; E/S-12345	Coded by weight class (A)	
	1951	Green on unpainted aluminum with border line; "GA 51" at top	"PEACH STATE" at bottom	A-12345; E/X-12345; E/S-12345	Coded by weight class (A)	
	1952	White on black with border line; "GA 52" at top	"PEACH STATE" at bottom	A-12345; E/X-12345; E/S-12345	Coded by weight class (A)	
	1953	Orange on black with border line; "GA 53" at top	"PEACH STATE" at bottom	A-12345; E/X-12345; E/S-12345	Coded by weight class (A)	
	1954	Black on yellow with border line; "GA 54" at top	"PEACH STATE" at bottom	A-12345; E/X-12345; E/S-12345	Coded by weight class (A)	
	1955	Yellow on black with border line; "GEORGIA 55" at top	"PEACH STATE" at bottom	A-12345; E/X-12345; E/S-12345	Coded by weight class (A)	
	1956	White on black with border line; "GEORGIA 56" at top	"PEACH STATE" at bottom	A-12345; E/X-12345; H/A-12345	Coded by weight class	Weight classes were as follows: E, E/X and D (3,000 lb and under); H/A through H/N (3,001 to 3,500 lb); J and K (3,501 to 4,000 lb); and A (4,001 lb and over).
	1957	White on dark green with border line; "GEORGIA" centered at top; "19" at bottom left and "57" at bottom right	"PEACH STATE" centered at bottom	1·12345; 1·A·12345; 10·1234; 10·A·1234; 100·1234; 100·A·123	Coded by county of issuance (1, 10 or 100) and weight class (see right)	Weight classes were as follows: D and E (3,000 lb and under); no letter (3,001 to 3,500 lb); J (3,501 to 4,000 lb); and A (4,001 lb and over). This continued through 1970.
	1958	Black on white with border line; "GEORGIA" centered at top; "19" at bottom left and "58" at bottom right	"PEACH STATE" centered at bottom	1·12345; 1·A·12345; 10·1234; 10·A·1234; 100·1234; 100·A·123	Coded by county of issuance (1, 10 or 100) and weight class	
	1959	White on black with border line; "GEORGIA" centered at top; "19" at bottom left and "59" at bottom right	"PEACH STATE" centered at bottom	1·12345; 1·A·12345; 10·1234; 10·A·1234; 100·1234; 100·A·123	Coded by county of issuance (1, 10 or 100) and weight class	
	1960	Black on white with border line; "GEORGIA" centered at top; "19" at bottom left and "60" at bottom right	"PEACH STATE" centered at bottom	1·12345; 1·A·12345; 10·1234; 10·A·1234; 100·1234; 100·A·123	Coded by county of issuance (1, 10 or 100) and weight class	
	1961	Black on yellow with border line; "GEORGIA" centered at top; "19" at bottom left and "61" at bottom right	"PEACH STATE" centered at bottom	1·12345; 1·A·12345; 10·1234; 10·A·1234; 100·1234; 100·A·123	Coded by county of issuance (1, 10 or 100) and weight class	
	1962	Red on white with border line; "GEORGIA" centered at top; "19" at bottom left and "62" at bottom right	"PEACH STATE" centered at bottom	1·12345; 1·A·12345; 10·1234; 10·A·1234; 100·1234; 100·A·123	Coded by county of issuance (1, 10 or 100) and weight class	
	1963	White on red with border line; "GEORGIA" centered at top; "19" at bottom left and "63" at bottom right	"PEACH STATE" centered at bottom	1·12345; 1·A·12345; 10·1234; 10·A·1234; 100·1234; 100·A·123	Coded by county of issuance (1, 10 or 100) and weight class	
	1964	Peach on green with border line; "GEORGIA" centered at top; "19" at bottom left and "64" at bottom right	"PEACH STATE" centered at bottom	1·12345; 1·A·12345; 10·1234; 10·A·1234; 100·1234; 100·A·123	Coded by county of issuance (1, 10 or 100) and weight class	
	1965	Blue on white with border line; "GEORGIA" centered at top; "19" at bottom left and "65" at bottom right	"PEACH STATE" centered at bottom	1·12345; 1·A·12345; 10·1234; 10·A·1234; 100·1234; 100·A·123	Coded by county of issuance (1, 10 or 100) and weight class	
	1966	White on red with border line; "19 GEORGIA 66" at bottom	"PEACH STATE" centered at top	1·12345; 1·A·12345; 10·1234; 10·A·1234; 100·1234; 100·A·123	Coded by county of issuance (1, 10 or 100) and weight class	
	1967	Red on white with border line; "GEORGIA" centered at top; "19" at bottom left and "67" at bottom right	"PEACH STATE" centered at bottom	1·12345; 1·A·12345; 10·1234; 10·A·1234; 100·1234; 100·A·123	Coded by county of issuance (1, 10 or 100) and weight class	
	1968	White on green with border line; "GEORGIA" centered at top; "19" at bottom left and "68" at bottom right	"PEACH STATE" centered at bottom	1·12345; 1·A·12345; 10·1234; 10·A·1234; 100·1234; 100·A·123	Coded by county of issuance (1, 10 or 100) and weight class	
	1969	White on black with border line; "GEORGIA" centered at top; "19" at bottom left and "69" at bottom right	"PEACH STATE" centered at bottom	1·12345; 1·A·12345; 10·1234; 10·A·1234; 100·1234; 100·A·123	Coded by county of issuance (1, 10 or 100) and weight class	
	1970	White on blue with border line; "GEORGIA" centered at top; "19" at bottom left and "70" at bottom right	"PEACH STATE" centered at bottom	1·12345; 1·A·12345; 10·1234; 10·A·1234; 100·1234; 100·A·123	Coded by county of issuance (1, 10 or 100) and weight class	

=== 1971 to present ===
Image	Dates issued	Design	Slogan	Serial format	Serials Issued	Notes
	1971–75	Embossed blue on reflective white with border line; "GEORGIA" centered at top; "71" at top left; county name on sticker at bottom	none	ABC 123	First letter corresponds to weight class (see right)	Weight classes were as follows: A, B, C and F (3,000 lb and under); E and G (3,001 to 3,500 lb); L, M and P (3,501 to 4,000 lb); and R and W (4,001 lb and over).
	1976–79	Embossed red on reflective white with border line; "GEORGIA" centered at top; "76" at top left; county name on sticker at bottom	none	ABC 123	First letter corresponds to weight class (see right)	Weight classes were as follows: A through E (3,000 lb and under); G and H (3,001 to 3,500 lb); L, M and N (3,501 to 4,000 lb); and R and S (4,001 lb and over).
	1979–80	Embossed red on reflective white with border line; "GEORGIA" centered at top; "76" at top left; county name on sticker at bottom	none	ABC 123	TAA 001 to TZZ 999; WAA 001 to approximately WGZ 999	
	1980–82	As above, but with "GEORGIA" screened rather than embossed	none	ABC 123	WHA 001 to approximately YFI 999	
	1983–89	Embossed green on reflective white; screened "19 GEORGIA 83" at top; county name on sticker at bottom	none	ABC 123	AAA 001 to approximately WCW 999	Vanity plates featured the "Peach State" slogan in place of the county-name sticker.
	1990 – March 1996	Embossed black on reflective gradient white and orange; screened green "Georgia" at top with peach graphic for the 'o'; "19" at top left and "90" at top right; county name on sticker at bottom	none	ABC 123	AAA 001 to ZZZ 999	Letters I, O, Q, U and V not used in either serial format. The ABC 1234 format used narrower dies.
	March 1996 – January 1997	Embossed black on reflective gradient white and orange; screened green "Georgia" at top with peach graphic for the 'o'; "19" at top left and "90" at top right; county name on sticker at bottom	none	ABC 1234	AAA 1001 to approximately ADM 9999	Letters I, O, Q, U and V not used in either serial format. The ABC 1234 format used narrower dies.
	February 1997 – June; 2001	Embossed black on reflective white with peach graphic at center; screened black "GEORGIA" at top, offset to left; county name on sticker at bottom	...on my mind	123 ABC	001 AAA to 999 ZZZ	Letters I and O not used in this serial format, and Q, U and V used only from 2000, beginning with the XAQ series.
	April 1997– June; 2001	Embossed black on reflective white with peach graphic at center; screened black "GEORGIA" at top, offset to left; county name on sticker at bottom		1234 AB	Intermittently from 1001 QA to 9999 YZ	Both these serial formats used on passenger vehicles (interchangeably with the 123 ABC format) and trucks, having originally been intended to be reserved for the latter. Letters I, O, U and V not used in the 1234 AB format. The 12345 QA format used narrower dies.
	April 1997– June; 2001	Embossed black on reflective white with peach graphic at center; screened black "GEORGIA" at top, offset to left; county name on sticker at bottom		12345 QA	Intermittently from 10001 QA to approximately 50000 QG	Both these serial formats used on passenger vehicles (interchangeably with the 123 ABC format) and trucks, having originally been intended to be reserved for the latter. Letters I, O, U and V not used in the 1234 AB format. The 12345 QA format used narrower dies.
	June 2001– November 2003	Embossed black on reflective white with peach graphic at center; screened black "GEORGIA" at top, offset to left; county name on sticker at bottom		1234 ABC	1001 AAA to approximately 9999 AWT	Same narrow dies as the 12345 QA format. Letters I, O, Q, U and V not used.
	December 2003– April; 2007	Embossed black on reflective gradient gray and white; peach graphic containing green state shape at center; county name on sticker at bottom	www.GEORGIA.gov	ABC 1234	Exclusively from AAA 0001 to approximately AVM 9999; intermittently from AVN 0001 to approximately AYP 4275	Letter O not used in this serial format.
	May 2007– April; 2012	Similar to above, but without gray gradient and "www." in web address	GEORGIA.gov	ABC 1234	Intermittently from AVN 0001 to approximately AWB 1750; exclusively from AWB 1751 to approximately CAQ 9999	Letter O not used in this serial format.
	May 2012– 2026	Screened black on reflective graphic plate with rolling hills, peach tree, and peaches	Peach State	ABC1234	Exclusively: PAA1000 to PEZ9999; PMA1000 to QBT1499; Alternating with plain peach plates: CAA1000 to approximately DEC9999; RAA0001 to approximately SMR9999; TAA0001 to TGW0701	On both these bases, "In God We Trust" can be printed at the bottom in place of the county name. Serials in the CAA to CAQ range appear intermittently between this base and the previous.
	May 2012– present	Screened black on reflective white; peach graphic in center	none	ABC1234	Exclusively: PFA1000 to PLZ9999; QFA1000 to QFP6449;	On both these bases, "In God We Trust" can be printed at the bottom in place of the county name. Serials in the CAA to CAQ range appear intermittently between this base and the previous.
	January 2026– present	Screened black on reflective graphic tan plate with state map on left, with US flag behind and 1776 overtop. On the top of the plate reads, "GEORGIA" and "250 Year Anniversary Revolutionary War".	250 Year Anniversary Revolutionary War	ABC1DE	AAA1AA to ABD6ZG (as of April 20, 2026)	
	March 2026– present	Screened black on reflective graphic tan plate with state map on left, with US flag behind and 1776 overtop. On the top of the plate reads, "GEORGIA" and "250 Year Anniversary Revolutionary War".	250 Year Anniversary Revolutionary War	AB1CDE	AA1AAA to AA1ADB (as of April 20, 2026)	

== County coding ==
Georgia used two sets of numeric county codes on its license plates between 1957 and 1970. On both sets, the order of the codes was based on the respective populations of each county, with the order of the codes from 1962 onwards based on the figures according to the 1960 United States census.

Since 1971, the name of the county of issuance has been displayed at the bottom of each plate – originally on a sticker, before becoming screened in 2012.

Code	1957–61	1962–70
1	Fulton	Fulton
2	Chatham	DeKalb
3	DeKalb	Chatham
4	Muscogee	Muscogee
5	Bibb	Bibb
6	Richmond	Richmond
7	Floyd	Cobb
8	Cobb	Dougherty
9	Troup	Floyd
10	Dougherty	Hall
11	Hall	Lowndes
12	Walker	Troup
13	Clarke	Clayton
14	Lowndes	Clarke
15	Whitfield	Walker
16	Carroll	Gwinnett
17	Colquitt	Whitfield
18	Thomas	Glynn
19	Laurens	Houston
20	Gwinnett	Carroll
21	Spalding	Spalding
22	Polk	Thomas
23	Ware	Ware
24	Baldwin	Baldwin
25	Glynn	Colquitt
26	Coweta	Laurens
27	Bartow	Coweta
28	Upson	Bartow
29	Bulloch	Polk
30	Sumter	Decatur
31	Coffee	Sumter
32	Decatur	Bulloch
33	Burke	Upson
34	Clayton	Tift
35	Tift	Cherokee
36	Mitchell	Coffee
37	Chattooga	Catoosa
38	Meriwether	Newton
39	Washington	Burke
40	Houston	Walton
41	Cherokee	Chattooga
42	Walton	Meriwether
43	Newton	Mitchell
44	Emanuel	Gordon
45	Worth	Washington
46	Jackson	Jackson
47	Grady	Stephens
48	Gordon	Habersham
49	Jefferson	Grady
50	Elbert	Wayne
51	Brooks	Elbert
52	Screven	Emanuel
53	Dodge	Crisp
54	Crisp	Henry
55	Early	Jefferson
56	Toombs	Toombs
57	Stephens	Douglas
58	Habersham	Worth
59	Tattnall	Dodge
60	Henry	Tattnall
61	Fannin	Brooks
62	Catoosa	Hart
63	Ben Hill	Screven
64	Haralson	Haralson
65	Hart	Liberty
66	Franklin	Barrow
67	Terrell	Peach
68	Wayne	Ben Hill
69	Macon	Fannin
70	Dooly	Columbia
71	Appling	Franklin
72	Berrien	Appling
73	Randolph	Macon
74	Telfair	Early
75	Barrow	Paulding
76	Greene	Chattahoochee
77	Wilkes	Terrell
78	Madison	McDuffie
79	Cook	Forsyth
80	Douglas	Berrien
81	Chattahoochee	Cook
82	Irwin	Telfair
83	Morgan	Dooly
84	Paulding	Madison
85	Peach	Greene
86	McDuffie	Harris
87	Harris	Randolph
88	Pierce	Wilkes
89	Hancock	Rockdale
90	Forsyth	Monroe
91	Murray	Murray
92	Monroe	Morgan
93	Turner	Lamar
94	Jenkins	Effingham
95	Lamar	Hancock
96	Wilcox	Camden
97	Gilmer	Pierce
98	Oglethorpe	Bleckley
99	Johnson	Wilkinson
100	Wilkinson	Irwin
101	Columbia	Jenkins
102	Jeff Davis	Butts
103	Bleckley	Gilmer
104	Stewart	Jeff Davis
105	Effingham	Pickens
106	Taylor	Dade
107	Butts	Jones
108	Miller	Turner
109	Bacon	Bacon
110	Pickens	Taylor
111	Pulaski	Pulaski
112	Warren	Fayette
113	Calhoun	Johnson
114	Rockdale	Twiggs
115	Pike	Oglethorpe
116	Liberty	Wilcox
117	Twiggs	Putnam
118	Candler	Rabun
119	Fayette	Stewart
120	Seminole	Warren
121	Montgomery	Calhoun
122	Putnam	Lumpkin
123	Talbot	Pike
124	Jones	Talbot
125	Jasper	Evans
126	Rabun	White
127	Dade	Miller
128	Atkinson	Seminole
129	Camden	Candler
130	Union	Clinch
131	Oconee	Union
132	Heard	Banks
133	Banks	McIntosh
134	Wheeler	Oconee
135	Lee	Montgomery
136	Evans	Bryan
137	Lumpkin	Lee
138	Treutlen	Atkinson
139	Marion	Jasper
140	Lincoln	Lincoln
141	Brantley	Brantley
142	Crawford	Treutlen
143	McIntosh	Crawford
144	Clinch	Marion
145	Bryan	Wheeler
146	Baker	Heard
147	White	Charlton
148	Clay	Lanier
149	Lanier	Clay
150	Charlton	Baker
151	Towns	Towns
152	Taliaferro	Long
153	Webster	Dawson
154	Schley	Taliaferro
155	Dawson	Schley
156	Long	Webster
157	Glascock	Glascock
158	Quitman	Quitman
159	Echols	Echols

== Non-passenger and optional types ==
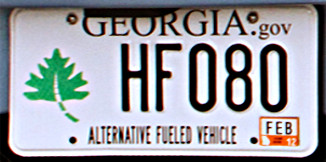
alternative fueled vehicle

Georgia was one of the first states to issue optional plates, introducing commemorative issues for several of its in-state colleges and universities in 1983. The only requirement is a minimum of 1000 plates ordered, thus the state has made plates for fans of Auburn University in Alabama and Clemson University in South Carolina.

The number of optional types has increased since 1983; Georgia currently offers many specialty or optional license plates, most at an extra cost to motorists. Revenue from the sale of specialty plates is shared with the sponsoring organization, provided that the sponsor is an in-state Georgia college or an organization which has been authorized to receive revenue by an act of the legislature. Organizations which have not received legislative authorization, and out of state colleges, are not eligible to receive revenue from specialty tag sales.

Effective with the 2005 base, the state streamlined the ever-growing number of limited-issuance plates by instituting two-letter prefixes for almost all types other than standard passenger plates. Most of these plate types first appeared on the www.GEORGIA.gov base and are currently migrating to the new GEORGIA.gov base.

The state also issues plates for non-passenger vehicles, such as trucks, school buses, and government vehicles.

Image	Type	Dates issued	Design	Slogan	Serial format	Serials issued	Notes
	University of Georgia	1984-current	Screened black on reflective gray-white gradient, color screened University of Georgia athletics logo at left; screened black band in place of county name with "University of Georgia" in red print		ABC123		Many variants issued since 1984. Currently, $10 of the vanity plate fee charged by the Department of Revenue supports student scholarships.
	1996 Summer Olympics	1993–96	Embossed red on reflective white with border line; 1996 Summer Olympics logo screened in green at left; screened green "Georgia" at top with red flame graphic for the 'o'	"Centennial Olympic Games" screened in green at bottom	12345; 123AB; 12AB3; 1AB23		Revalidated until 1997. Plate shown was issued in 1993.
	Florida State University	2013-2020	Screened black on reflective white; Florida State University logo screened in color at left; screened "Georgia" in black at top.	"Florida State University" screened in red at bottom	ABC123		Replaced with updated design.
	Antique Vehicle	2004-2007	Embossed black on grey-white gradient; "Hobby Antique Vehicle" and image of antique car screened on left; debossed areas on bottom for month, county, and year stickers.	www.GEORGIA.gov screened at top	HA1BCD		
	Government (COUNTY endorsement)	1910-current	Embossed black on reflective white with peach graphic at center; screened black "GEORGIA" at top, offset to left; county name on sticker at bottom; endorsement and GOVT embossed on left side	...on my mind	143456		Far left endorsement changes with applying authority. Variations include CITY, COUNTY, STATE, and BOARD (for Board of Education owned vehicles).
