= Georgia Department of Driver Services =

Georgia public agency issuance of driver's licenses, learner's permits, photo IDs

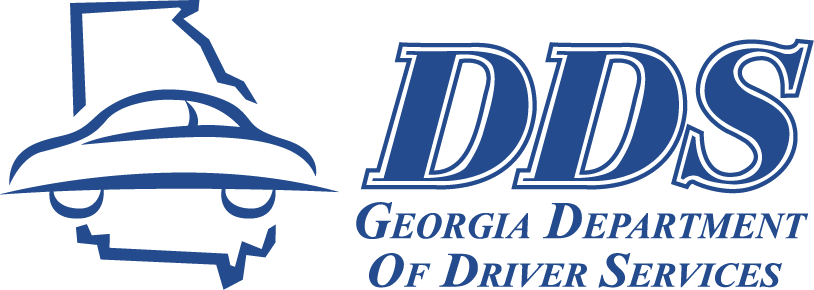

Agency overview
- Formed: July 1, 2005
- Headquarters: Conyers, Georgia
- Motto: Our Mission at DDS is to provide secure driver and identity credentials to our customers with excellence and respect.
- Employees: 897
- Annual budget: $97,407,607
- Agency executives: Angelique B. McClendon, Commissioner of Driver Services; David W. Connell, Chair of the Board of Driver Services
- Parent agency: Georgia Board of Driver Services
- Website: dds.georgia.gov

The Georgia Department of Driver Services (DDS) is a state agency responsible for driver's licenses, learner's permits, photo ID cards, and limousine chauffeur permits. Its responsibilities are outlined in Chapter 16 of Title 40 of the Official Code of Georgia Annotated. It is the successor agency to the Georgia Department of Motor Vehicle Safety, which was abolished on July 1, 2005 following financial scandals.

The department also works alongside the Georgia Department of Public Safety (which received the duty of vehicle inspections and vehicle law enforcement) through shared building use, the Georgia Department of Revenue (which received the duty of recording vehicle titles and license plates), with Georgia's courts to record penalties and suspend licenses of drivers who violate Georgia's vehicle code through a point-based system. and local counties (which have the responsibility of distributing license plates and renewing vehicle registrations).

== History ==
The Georgia General Assembly established the Georgia Department of Public Safety in 1937, with one of its original functions being to "provide a division to administer the proper licensing of operators and chauffeurs of motor vehicles."

On April 28, 2000, the General Assembly passed House Bill 1441 which created the Georgia Department of Motor Vehicle Safety (DMVS). The Department of Motor Vehicle Safety took over several duties from the Department of Public Safety, and included handling the registration and titling of vehicles, the issuance of driver's licenses, enforcing laws relating to the size and weight of vehicles, trailers, and loads, and enforcing several other laws relating to roadways. The bill was set to go into effect on July 1, 2001.

On May 2, 2005, Governor Sonny Perdue signed House Bill 501 authored by Representative Austin Scott which dissolved and reorganized the Department of Motor Vehicle Safety into the Department of Driver Services. The bill broke apart the Department of Motor Vehicle Safety and reassigned many of its duties to other agencies, namely that the Department of Revenue would take over everything regarding license plates and vehicle titles, the Department of Public Safety would be returned its full enforcement responsibilities for the size and weights of vehicles, and the newly created Department of Driver Services would take over the issuance of drivers license and identification cards.

The Department of Driver Services announced that in compliance with federal law, all new licenses and identification cards issued by the department will be REAL ID compliant by May 7, 2025. Department service centers require that Georgians provide one proof of identity (birth certificate, unexpired U.S. passport, etc.), proof of any name changes (if applicable), your social security card (if applicable), and two pieces of proof of Georgia residency (can include bills sent to your home address within the six months, school records, mortgage payments, etc.).

Following the passage of House Bill 296 in the General Assembly, Georgia drivers may present drivers licenses to law enforcement officers through in an electronic format. Georgians will also be allowed to present their electronic ID or license to purchase tobacco or alcohol products at select retailers. A driver's license must be REAL ID compliant, and must sync through either a driver's Apple Wallet or Samsung Wallet. This law will go into full effect by July 1, 2027, which is the date that all law enforcement officers must obtain equipment which can properly verify a license presented in an electronic format.

== Digital Services ==
The Department of Driver Services offers several services online to Georgia drivers. Georgia drivers above the age of 18 can pay super speeder fines, renew or replace their driver's license, order identification cards, upgrade a Class D license (provisional driver's license) to a Class C (full driver's license), purchase a driving history report, schedule road tests, and more.

For the completion of several services (such as permit tests, road tests, etc.) an in-person appointment at a service center is necessary.
