= Business manager =

Occupation

A business manager is a person who manages the business affairs of an individual, institution, organization, or company. Business managers drive the work of others (if any) in order to operate efficiently and (in the case of for-profit companies) to make a profit. They should have working knowledge of the following areas, and may be a specialist in one or more: finance, marketing and public relations. Other technical areas in which a business manager may have expertise include law, science, and computer programming. In some circumstances, business managers even have oversight over human resources.

== Role profile ==
In many businesses, the role may be established to relieve the owner of responsibility, in order to focus on specific aspects of company expansion. Typically, the business manager and the owner work may work in synergy to ensure successful running of business. Having a specialization in a particular field, such as sales, marketing, public relations or finance aids in efficiency, yet despite the usual academic qualities of a business manager, business managers also develop personal qualities that are helpful in performing the role efficiently.

A social skill of a business manager is the ability to understand and know what each of their subordinate employee's tasks are and how to work with each employee in working toward successful completion of such tasks.

A business manager should be willing to accept constructive criticism from employees, develop social skills, be organized, honest and able to take good decisions. A business manager is expected to be willing to work along his or her employees in order to create a better work environment.

== Examples in industry ==
In the music industry, a business manager is a representative of musicians or recording artists or both, whose main job is to supervise their business affairs and financial matters. The role largely originated from Allen Klein, who represented numerous performers, helping them to both invest their incomes wisely and to recover unpaid (or underpaid) royalties and fees.

Business managers commonly have an overlapping presence in both the entertainment and sports industries, as illustrated by business manager Barry Klarberg, who represents entertainer Justin Timberlake as well professional athletes C. J. Wilson, Mark Messier and Anna Kournikova.

In government and the military, the equivalent position is executive officer or chief of staff.

== See also ==
- Chief executive officer (CEO)
- General manager
- Product manager
- Property manager
- Talent manager
- Chief of staff
