= CertusBank =

American bank

CertusBank, N.A.
- Type: Private company
- Industry: Banking, financial services
- Founded: 2010
- Defunct: 2015
- Fate: Liquidated
- Headquarters: Greenville, South Carolina, United States
- Area served: Nationwide
- Key people: Len Davenport, CEO
- Products: Debit cards, consumer banking, corporate banking, investment banking, wholesale banking, global wealth management, financial analysis
- Number of employees: 500 (October 2014)
- Website: CertusBank.com

CertusBank was an American nationally chartered bank, with a presence in twelve U.S. states. The bank was headquartered in Greenville, South Carolina, with secondary corporate offices in Atlanta, Georgia, and Charlotte, North Carolina. At its peak the bank operated more than 30 retail branches in The Carolinas, Florida, and Georgia. The bank elected to go into liquidation in 2015. Creditors sued, and accepted a final settlement in 2017.

The company provided retail banking, consumer lending, wholesale banking, wealth management, and mortgage lending.

CertusBank, N.A. was a subsidiary of CertusHoldings, Inc. (formerly Blue Ridge Holdings, Inc.) headquartered in Atlanta, Georgia and was created by former executives from Bank of America and Wachovia.

CertusBank was the result of the combination of several acquisitions since 2011, including CommunitySouth Bank and Trust of Easley, South Carolina; Atlantic Southern Bank of Macon, Georgia; and First Georgia Banking Company of Franklin, Georgia. Subsequent CertusBank acquisitions included Charlotte, North Carolina–based Myers Park Mortgage, Inc.; Hometown Community Bank of Braselton, Georgia; Quadrant Financial, Inc. of Savannah, Georgia; Resource Financial Services of Columbia, South Carolina; and Parkway Bank of Lenoir, North Carolina.

== History ==
CertusBank was founded by Angela Webb, Walter Davis, Milton Jones Jr and Charles Williams who served in various leadership roles. In 2010, CertusHoldings received a shelf charter from the Comptroller of the Currency and raised $500 million from investors.

On January 21, 2011, the new CertusBank bought the failed CommunitySouth Bank & Trust of Easley, South Carolina, whose six branches reopened as CertusBank the next day. As of September 30, 2010, CommunitySouth had $402.4 million in deposits and $440.6 million in assets. The FDIC agreed to share losses on $211.3 million of its assets. Easley became the headquarters city for CertusBank.

In May 2011, CertusBank added 26 more locations. In deals arranged by the FDIC, CertusBank bought the operations of two failed Georgia banks—Atlantic Southern Bank of Macon, with assets of $741.9 million and deposits of $707.6 million, and First Georgia Banking Co. of Franklin (for a grand total of over $1 billion in value). The FDIC agreed to cover $273.5 million in problem loans for Atlantic Southern and $156.5 million for First Georgia.

In October 2011, CertusBank acquired Sage Southeastern Securities of Atlanta, Georgia, and added brokerage capabilities to its wealth management offering.

On August 3, 2012, CertusBank acquired Myers Park Mortgage, based out of Charlotte, North Carolina. Shortly after, the bank acquired Quadrant Financial, Inc. This acquisition placed CertusBank as the largest Small Business Administration (SBA) 7A lender based in South Carolina and led to the creation of a new business division, CertusBank Small Business Finance. Operations of Quadrant Financial continue in the company's locations outside of the CertusBank footprint under the leadership of co-founders John Handmaker and George Vredeveld Jr.

On November 16, 2012, CertusBank acquired the assets of Hometown Community Bank of Braselton, Georgia under a Purchase and Assumption Agreement with the FDIC. At the close of business on November 16, 2012, Hometown Community Bank was closed by the Georgia Department of Banking and Finance, and the FDIC was appointed Receiver. Simultaneously, CertusBank assumed deposits and certain other liabilities and purchased certain related assets of the bank.

In December 2012, CertusBank finalized its acquisition of Resource Financial Services, an independently owned mortgage company is based in Columbia, SC.

On April 26, 2013, CertusBank acquired the assets and deposits of Parkway Bank of Lenoir, North Carolina, which was closed by state regulators.

On August 19, 2013, CertusBank announced its intention to make a strategic investment in Monarch Business and Wealth Management, a joint venture between Barry Klarberg and Asset Alliance Corporation. Monarch represents professional athletes, international entertainers, and high-net worth families.

On April 9, 2014, John S. Poelker was named interim president and chief executive officer, and Dr. Robert L. Wright was named chairman of the board. In May, 2015, John S. Poelker (chairman, president, and CEO) resigned from his positions to deal with health concerns. Len Davenport, CertusBank's CIO and treasurer, was named interim CEO by the company's board members.

In 2015, amidst mounting losses and allegations of lavish executive spending, the bank elected to liquidate. Hedge fund investors sued, and the ousted founders counter-sued for defamation. Fines for excessive spending were levied by the U.S. Treasury's Office of the Comptroller of the Currency. Creditors eventually accepted a settlement worth 7 cents on the dollar.

== Community involvement ==
CertusBank supported several community-oriented organizations, including the Peace Center for the Performing Arts, Habitat for Humanity, the Greenville County Museum of Art, the Northside Development Corporation, and the South Carolina Governor's School for Science and Mathematics.
