= Georgia Council on Criminal Justice Reform =

The Georgia Council on Criminal Justice Reform is a fifteen-member, non-partisan state commission tasked with conducting annual comprehensive reviews of criminal laws, criminal procedure, sentencing laws, adult correctional issues, juvenile justice issues, enhancement of probation and parole supervision, better management of the prison population and of the population in the custody of the Department of Juvenile Justice, and other issues relates to criminal proceedings and accountability courts in the state of Georgia.

== Background ==
For several decades, Georgia enacted "tough on crime" legislation with the intent of deterring criminal activity. While this was the popular approach, its implementation led to a prison population in Georgia that had more than doubled to nearly 56,000 inmates by 2010. As a result, Georgia had one of the highest proportions of adult residents under correctional control. This growth also came at a substantial cost to Georgia’s taxpayers. In FY 2011, Georgia spent more than $1 billion annually on corrections, up from $492 million in FY 1990. Yet despite this growth, the recidivism rate had remained unchanged at nearly 30 percent throughout the previous decade. In addition to this, calculations showed that if current policies remained in place, Georgia's prison population would rise by another 8 percent to reach nearly 60,000 inmates by 2016, requiring the state to invest an addition $264 million to expand prison capacity.

Seeking new ways to protect public safety while controlling the growth of prison costs, the Georgia General Assembly passed HB 265 to establish the inter-branch Special Council on Criminal Justice Reform for Georgians. The legislation also created a Special Joint Committee on Georgia Criminal Justice Reform, made up of members from both legislative chambers, to consider the Council's recommendations in the 2012 legislative session. To guide the Council's work, the state’s leaders laid out the following goals:

- Address the growth of the state’s prison population;
- Contain corrections costs and increase efficiencies and effectiveness that result in better offender management;
- Improve public safety by reinvesting a portion of the savings into strategies that reduce crime and recidivism; and
- Hold offenders accountable by strengthening community-based supervision, sanctions and services.

In its first year, the Special Council produced policy recommendations that led to significant adult corrections and sentencing reform enacted through HB 1176. Soon after, Governor Deal issued an executive order expanding the Special Council’s membership and directed it to focus on Georgia’s juvenile justice system. During the 2013 legislative session, the Special Council's recommendations were included in HB 242, a sweeping rewrite of the juvenile code. Recognizing the need for further reform, the General Assembly also passed and Governor Deal subsequently signed HB 349, which created the newly named Georgia Council on Criminal Justice Reform in statute and gave it a five-year mandate to improve public safety through better oversight of the adult and juvenile correctional systems.

== Adult Corrections and Sentencing ==
Primarily addressed in the initial report and HB 1176, recommendations from the Council have profoundly impacted adult corrections and sentencing in Georgia. The initial report found that the growth in the prison population was in large part due to the policy decisions concerning who was being sent to prison. Of concern to the Council was that the majority of offenders sentenced to prison were low-risk drug and property offenders. The Council also identified several challenges to the state’s ability to effectively supervise offenders on probation and parole and provide interventions that can reduce the likelihood of re-offending. To address these concerns, recommendations from the Council adopted in HB 1176 included: expanding accountability courts, increasing funding in evidence-based programs to reduce recidivism, and providing judges sentencing options other than prison.

== Juvenile Justice ==
In 2012, the Council shifted its focus to reforming Georgia's juvenile justice system. The primary reasons for the juvenile justice reforms found in HB 242 were the high cost and minimum impact on recidivism made by out-of-home facilities. Juvenile Justice recommendations adopted by the General Assembly included: the creation of a two-class designated felony act, Prohibiting status offenders and certain misdemeanants from being disposed to residential facilities, and strengthening evidence-based community supervision and programs to provide juvenile judges with more sentencing options.

== Reentry ==
With important reforms well underway in the adult and juvenile corrections systems, Governor Deal asked Council members in 2013 to focus their attention on offender reentry, the critical junction between incarceration and the recommencement of community life. To assist the Council's newest initiative, Governor Deal issued an executive order creating the Governor's Office of Transition, Support and Reentry. Council members decided to partner with the Michigan-based Center for Justice Innovation and reentry expert Dennis Schrantz. After extensive data analysis and meetings with stakeholders in multiple jurisdictions, a core team of state agency stakeholders facilitated by Schrantz developed the Georgia Prisoner Reentry Initiative (GA-PRI), which lays the foundation for a five-year effort expected to make Georgia a leader in recidivism reduction.

The fundamental goals of the GA-PRI are to:

- Promote public safety by reducing the threat of harm to persons, families and their property by citizens returning to their communities from prison; and
- Increase success rates of returning citizens who transition from prison by fostering effective, evidence-based risk and need management and treatment, returning citizen accountability, and safe family, community and victim participation.

== Misdemeanor Probation ==
Controversy over misdemeanor probation led to the passage of a reform bill by the Georgia Assembly in 2014; however, Governor Deal vetoed the bill because of concerns it would allow private companies to avoid public disclosure of information about their operations. Recognizing that reform was needed, Governor Deal asked the Council to examine the issue and make recommendations for consideration during the 2015 legislative session. After reviewing misdemeanor probation, the Council submitted 12 recommendations in their report, which were included in HB 310. A few of the Council's key recommendations to improve transparency and fairness of misdemeanor probation included: allowing fines to be converted to community service for probationers unable to pay, absent a waiver, no probationer's sentence may be revoked for failure to pay fines, fees, or costs without holding a hearing, and shifting all obligations, powers and duties previously conferred upon CMPAC be transferred to the Georgia Department of Community Supervision.

== Members ==
The Council is co-chaired by the Honorable Michael Boggs and Thomas Worthy, Esq.

Below is a listing of both current and former members of the Council:

- Hon. Bill Cowsert, Senator, District 46
- Hon. BJ Pak, Representative, District 108
- Hon. Michael Boggs, Judge, Georgia Court of Appeals (Co-Chair)
- Hon. Jason Deal, Judge, Superior Court of Northeastern Judicial Circuit
- Hon. Steve Teske, Judge, Clayton County Juvenile Court
- Jackie Johnson, Esq., District Attorney, Brunswick Judicial Circuit
- Christine Van Dross, Esq., Public Defender, Clayton County
- Hon. Scott Berry, Sheriff, Oconee County
- Hon. J.P. Taylor, Problem Solving Court, Pataula Judicial Circuit
- Thomas Worthy, Esq., Director of Governmental and External Affairs, State Bar of Georgia (Co-Chair)
- T.J. Bement, District Court Administrator, Tenth Judicial Administrative District
- Paul Bolster, Esq., Executive Director, Georgia Supportive Housing Association
- Roy Copeland, Esq., Criminal Defense Attorney and Assistant Professor of Management at Valdosta State University
- Henry Kelly, Project Executive, Georgia Power Company
- Teresa Roseborough, Esq., Executive Vice President, General Counsel and Corporate Secretary, The Home Depot
- Hon. Stephanie Woodard, Solicitor General, Hall County
