= Georgia Department of Audits and Accounts =

Government agency of Georgia, U.S.

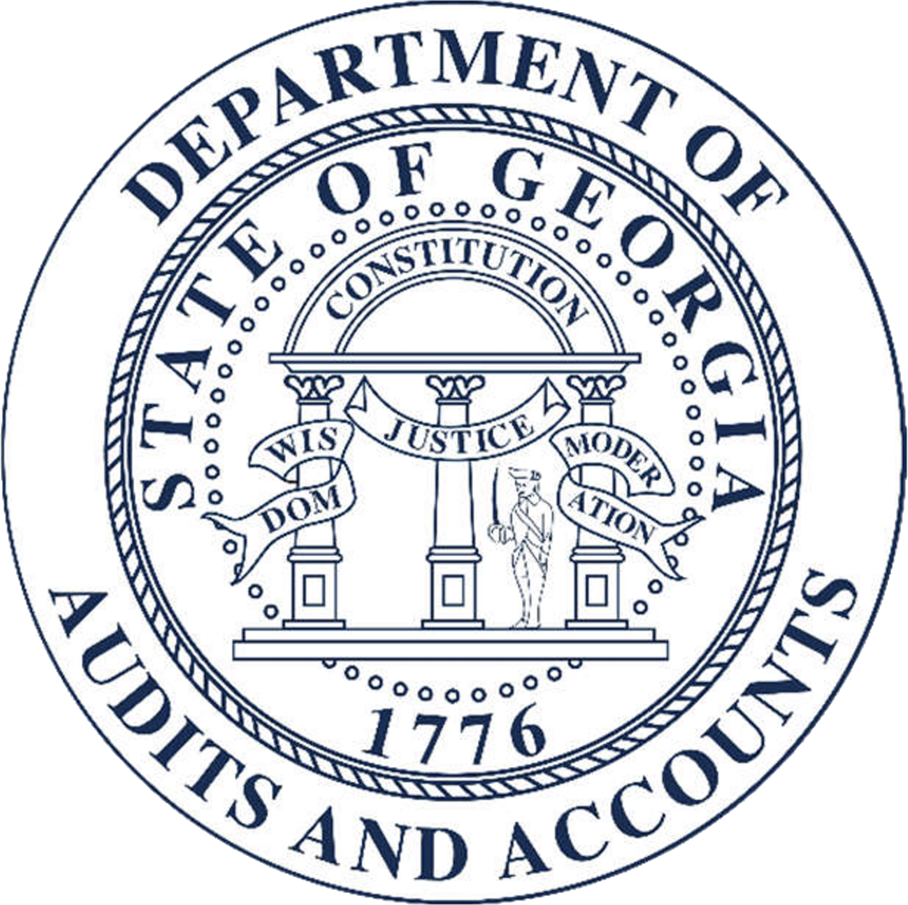
- Seal

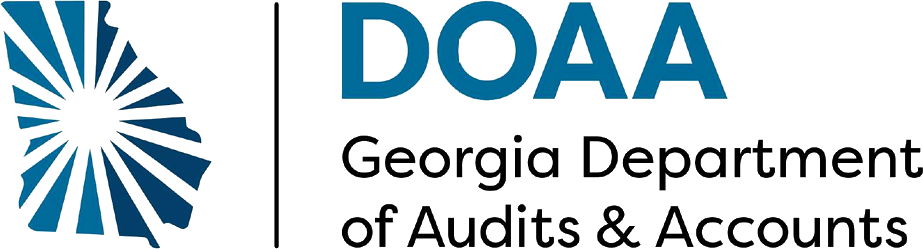
- Logo

Department overview
- Formed: December 6, 1923
- Jurisdiction: Georgia
- Headquarters: 270 Washington Street SW, Room 4-101; Atlanta, Georgia 30334
- Department executive: Greg S. Griffin, State Auditor
- Parent department: Georgia General Assembly
- Website: audits2.ga.gov

The Georgia Department of Audits and Accounts (DOAA) is an agency of the U.S. state of Georgia responsible for performing financial, compliance, and performance audits of state agencies, public colleges and universities, school systems, and other entities that receive state funds. Headquartered in Atlanta, the department is headed by the state auditor, who, unlike most Georgia agency heads, is elected by the Georgia General Assembly rather than appointed by the governor. DOAA was created by act of the General Assembly on December 6, 1923, and is one of the oldest continuously operating agencies in Georgia state government.

== History ==
DOAA was established on December 6, 1923, to ensure the protection and proper use of the state's stores, equipment, and property through annual financial audits of every department, institution, agency, commission, bureau, and officer of the state. The department's responsibilities have since expanded to include local education agency audits, performance audits, tax incentive evaluations, reviews of local government and nonprofit financial audits, legislative fiscal notes, retirement bill certifications, and preparation of an annual equalized adjusted property tax digest used to allocate state education funding. A dedicated Performance Audit Division was established within the department in 1971 to conduct in-depth reviews of state-funded programs.

Since its creation, DOAA has had ten state auditors:

State Auditor	Term
Samuel Jordan Slate	1923–1929
Tom Wisdom	1929–1938
Edward Zachary Arnold	1938–1941
B.E. Thrasher	1941–1964
Ernest B. Davis	1964–1976
William M. Nixon	1976–1985
G.W. Hogan	1985–1992
Claude L. Vickers	1992–1999
Russell W. Hinton	1999–2012
Greg S. Griffin	2012–present

== Leadership and selection ==
Under O.C.G.A. § 50-6-1, the state auditor must be an experienced accountant and auditor with at least five years of relevant governmental or certified public accounting experience. The auditor is elected by majority vote of both chambers of the General Assembly, with the House of Representatives voting first and transmitting its selection to the Senate for confirmation. If a vacancy occurs while the General Assembly is not in session, the governor is empowered to appoint a state auditor to serve until the legislature's next regular session, at which point the General Assembly elects a state auditor under the normal process. This pattern occurred in 1999, when Russell Hinton was appointed state auditor by the governor in June and subsequently confirmed by the General Assembly in March 2000, and again in 2012, when Governor Nathan Deal appointed Greg Griffin, then the state's accounting officer, to succeed the retiring Hinton effective July 1, 2012. Griffin, a certified public accountant and Auburn University graduate, began his career as an auditor with Deloitte before spending nearly 25 years with AT&T and its affiliates, then served as Georgia's state accounting officer from 2008 until his appointment as state auditor.

== Functions ==
DOAA's work is organized around several core activities:

- Financial audits – annual financial and compliance audits of state agencies, the University System of Georgia, and other state-funded entities.
- Performance audits and special examinations – evaluations of the efficiency and effectiveness of state programs, intended to identify opportunities for improvement as well as fraud, waste, or abuse. A January 2024 performance audit, for example, found that Georgia lacked a coordinated state-level response to homelessness despite an estimated $811.8 million in federal homelessness funding flowing through the state between federal fiscal years 2018 and 2022.
- Local government and nonprofit oversight – desk reviews of local government and nonprofit financial audits submitted under O.C.G.A. §§ 36-81-7, 50-8-38, and 50-20-3–4.
- Fiscal notes – analyses, issued jointly with the Governor's Office of Planning and Budget, of the fiscal impact of proposed legislation on state and local expenditures.
- Equalized adjusted property tax digest – an annual study of each county's property tax digest used to help allocate state Quality Basic Education funding.
- Open Georgia – a public transparency portal providing access to state salary, travel reimbursement, and expenditure data.
- Compliance reporting – tracking of state and local entity compliance with the Transparency in Government Act and with Georgia's Illegal Immigration Reform and Enforcement Act, including agencies' use of the federal E-Verify program.

== Headquarters ==
DOAA is headquartered at 270 Washington Street SW, Room 4-101, in downtown Atlanta, near the Georgia State Capitol.

== See also ==
- Government of Georgia (U.S. state)
- Georgia Department of Administrative Services
- Georgia State Capitol
