= Georgia Department of Community Supervision =

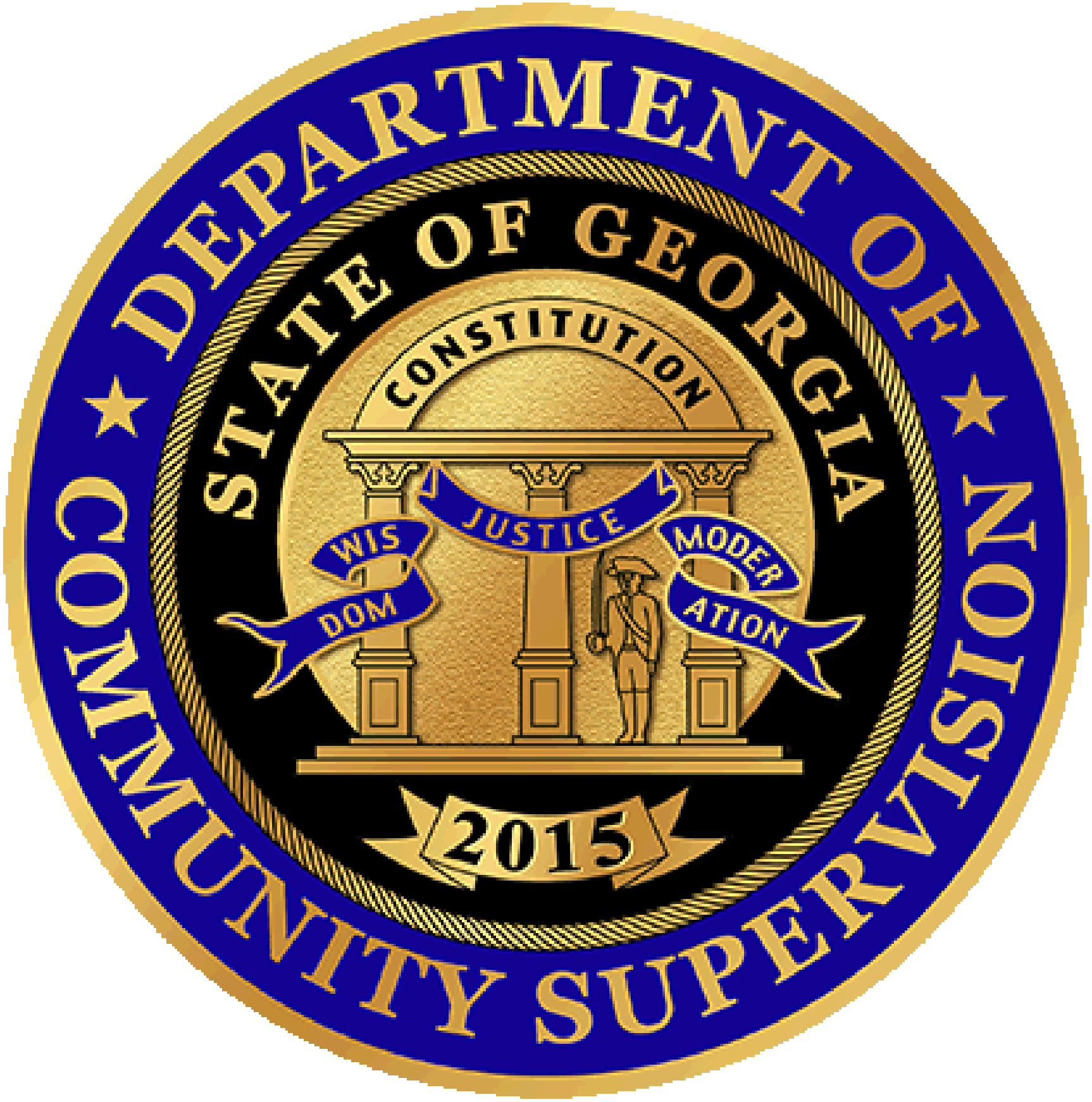
- Abbreviation: DCS

Agency overview
- Formed: July 1, 2015

Jurisdictional structure
- Operations jurisdiction: Georgia, United States

Operational structure
- Headquarters: Atlanta, Georgia
- Agency executive: Michael Nail, Commissioner

Website
- dcs.georgia.gov

The Georgia Department of Community Supervision (DCS) is an executive branch agency of the U.S. state of Georgia. DCS is headquartered in the James H "Sloppy" Floyd Veterans Memorial Building with additional field offices throughout the state. DCS is tasked with: the supervision and reentry services of felony probationers and parolees; the oversight of adult misdemeanor probation providers; and, provides administrative support to the Georgia Commission on Family Violence (GCFV).

== History ==
In 2013, Governor Nathan Deal and the Georgia General Assembly passed legislation creating The Georgia Council on Criminal Justice Reform. The council's charge was to conduct periodic comprehensive reviews of criminal laws, criminal procedure, sentencing laws, adult correctional issues, juvenile justice issues, enhancement of probation and parole supervision, better management of the prison population and of the population in the custody of the Department of Juvenile Justice, and other issues relates to criminal proceedings and accountability courts.

After a comprehensive study of the current issues facing Georgia's community corrections system, the Council and Governor Deal determined that enhancements to public safety and governmental efficiency could be achieved by creating one state agency that is responsible for all offender supervision within Georgia's communities.

As the next step in Governor Deal's ongoing criminal justice reform efforts, HB 310 was introduced during the 2015 legislative session. Addressing the recommendations made by the GCCJR, HB 310 transferred the responsibilities of the community supervision of parolees from the Georgia State Board of Pardons and Paroles, probationers from the Department of Corrections, and certain Class A and B juveniles from the Department of Juvenile Justice to the Department of Community Supervision. The bill also transferred the oversight responsibilities of private and governmental misdemeanor probation entities from the County and Municipal Probation Advisory Council (CMPAC) to the newly created Board of Community Supervision.

The Georgia General Assembly passed HB 310 and on May 7, 2015, Governor Deal signed HB 310 into law, thereby creating the Department of Community Supervision.

== Mission ==
As an integral part of the criminal justice system, we protect and serve the state of Georgia through effective and efficient community supervision while providing opportunities for successful outcomes.

== Offender Supervision ==
The creation of DCS has enabled the consolidation of the once separate and independent supervision components of parole and probation. This consolidation allows case assignments to be made based upon the geographic location of an offender's residence as opposed to the offender's status within the criminal justice system. DCS field offices are aligned with the established ten judicial districts which comprise the current forty-nine judicial circuits.

== Adult Misdemeanor Probation ==
Prior to the creation of DCS, the County and Municipal Probation Advisory Council (CMPAC) was tasked by the General Assembly with regulating misdemeanor probation being managed by private companies. In 2006, the council's role expanded to regulate all misdemeanor providers, including governmental misdemeanor probation providers. This oversight stems from related changes in law, O.C.G.A. §§ 42-8-100 through 108, assigning municipal and county governments the responsibility for managing misdemeanor probation operations in lieu of the Georgia Department of Corrections. Effective July 1, 2015, the roles and responsibilities previously performed by CMPAC were transferred to the Board of Community Supervision.

== Day Reporting Centers ==
DCS offers Day Reporting Centers (DRCs) in many judicial circuits throughout Georgia. DRCs are community-based programs that are highly structured, non-residential alternatives targeting high risk/ high need offenders. Intensive programming targets substance abuse, mental health, and/ or cognitive/ behavioral issues through counseling/educational programming and close supervision. DRC's operate in three phases: Detox/Behavior Stabilization, Sobriety/Employment and Aftercare.

== Board ==
The Board of Community Supervision as outlined in HB 310 consists of the: Commissioner of the Georgia Department of Corrections, Commissioner of the Department of Juvenile Justice, Chairman of the State Board of Pardons and Paroles, Vice Chairman of the State Board of Pardons and Paroles, Commissioner of the Department of Behavioral Health and Developmental Disabilities, Director of the Georgia Division of Family and Children Services (DFCS), one County Commissioner, one representative from Private Probation Entity, one representative from a Governmental Entity, one City Manager, and one Sheriff appointed by the Governor.

The Board of Community Supervision is the sole entity responsible for promulgating rules and regulations regarding:

- Contracts or agreements for probation services
- Conduct of business by private service providers and governments establishing probation systems
- Registration of private and governmental service providers
- Uniform professional and contract standards in rendering misdemeanor probation supervision
- Counseling and collection services to the courts
- Inspection and investigation of private and governmental service providers
- Enforcement of registration requirements

DCS Board members are:

- Tyrone Oliver, Commissioner of the Department of Juvenile Justice
- Terry Barnard, Chairman of the State Board of Pardons and Paroles
- Brian Owens, Vice Chairman of the State Board of Pardons and Paroles
- Judy Fitzgerald, Commissioner of the Department of Behavioral Health and Developmental Disabilities
- Timothy C. Ward, Commissioner of the Department of Corrections
- Steve Queen, Director of Field Services for CSRA Probation Services
- Tom C. Rawlings, Director of the Office of the Child Advocate
- Kevin Little, Chairman of the Walton County Board of Commissioners
- Sonja Fillingame, City Manager of Union City
- Nick Norton, Sheriff of Lanier County
