= Georgia Department of Administrative Services =

Government agency of Georgia, U.S.

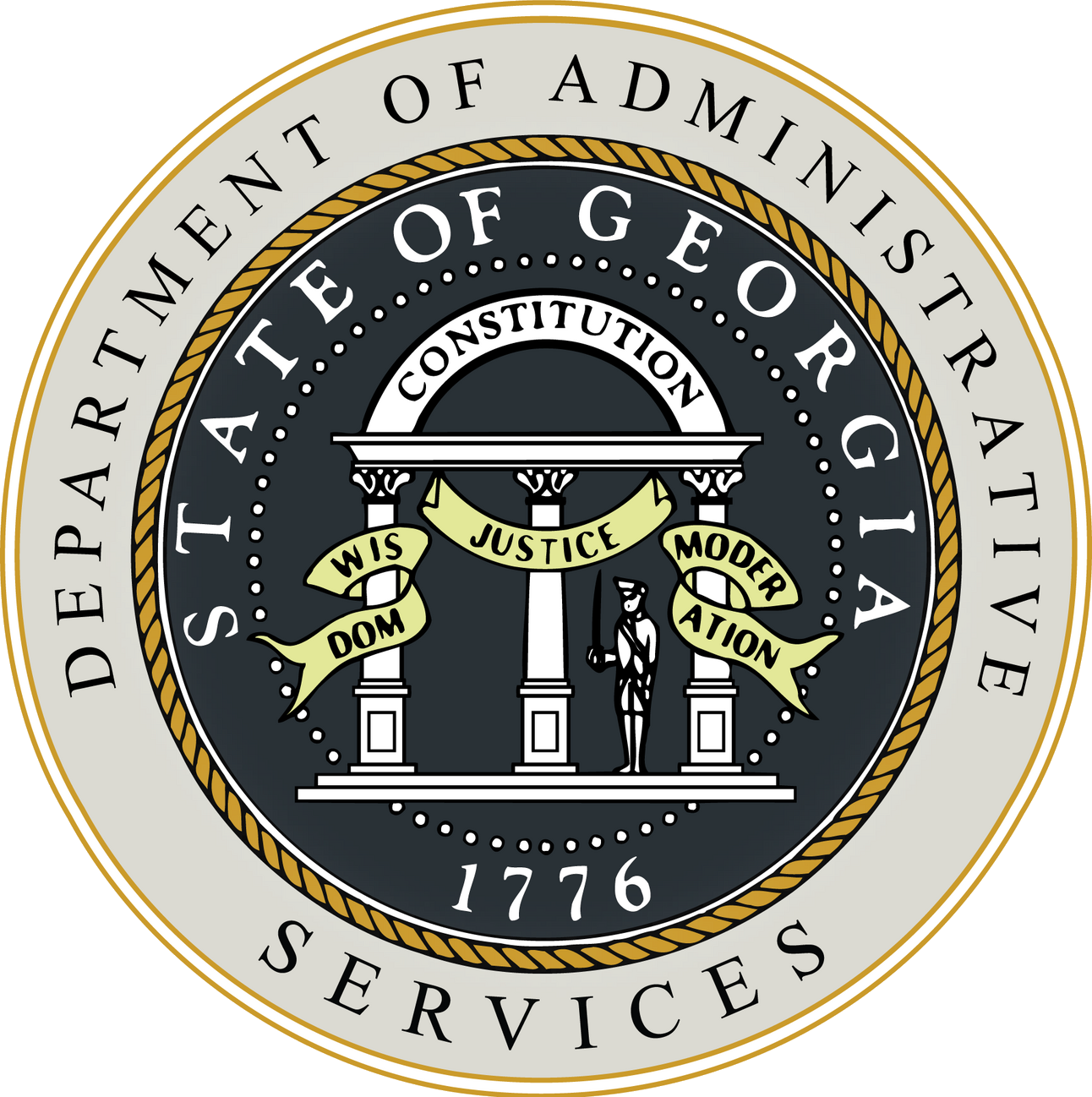

Department overview
- Formed: 1972
- Jurisdiction: Georgia
- Headquarters: James H. "Sloppy" Floyd Building; 200 Piedmont Avenue SE; Atlanta, Georgia 30334
- Department executive: Rebecca Sullivan, Commissioner
- Parent department: Office of the Governor
- Website: doas.ga.gov

The Georgia Department of Administrative Services (DOAS) is an agency of the executive branch of the U.S. state of Georgia that provides centralized administrative and business support services to other state and local government entities. Headquartered in Atlanta, the department's core functions include statewide procurement, risk management, fleet management, human resources administration, and the disposition of surplus state and federal property. DOAS was created in 1972 as part of a reorganization of Georgia's executive branch carried out under then-governor Jimmy Carter. The department is headed by a commissioner appointed by the governor of Georgia.

== History ==
DOAS was established in 1972 as part of a government reorganization plan that Governor Jimmy Carter submitted to the Georgia General Assembly, which consolidated dozens of overlapping state agencies into approximately 30 large departments, including the newly created Department of Natural Resources, Department of Human Resources, and Department of Administrative Services. The reorganization bill, opposed by Lieutenant Governor Lester Maddox, passed the state Senate by a single vote. Among the efficiencies cited by supporters of the plan was the consolidation of separate agency print shops into a single shared facility. The department's structure and powers are codified in Title 50, Chapter 5 of the Official Code of Georgia Annotated, created pursuant to O.C.G.A. § 50-5-1.

== Organization ==
DOAS is organized into five operating divisions:

- State Purchasing Division – negotiates and administers statewide competitive contracts and is charged under the State Purchasing Act (O.C.G.A. § 50-5-50 et seq.) with canvassing sources of supply and establishing standard purchasing specifications for state government entities.
- Risk Management Services – directs the state's self-insured workers' compensation, liability, property, and unemployment insurance programs, and manages the Georgia State Indemnification Program for public officers and educators.
- Human Resources Administration – works with the State Personnel Board to set uniform statewide personnel policy, administers the state's Flexible Benefits Plan, and publishes an annual statewide workforce report.
- Office of Fleet Management – provides guidance on the purchase, assignment, maintenance, and disposal of state-owned vehicles.
- Surplus Property – identifies and distributes surplus state and federal property to state agencies, local governments, eligible nonprofit organizations, veterans, and the public.

The Office of State Administrative Hearings, which conducts hearings in contested cases brought against state agencies, is assigned to DOAS for administrative purposes only and operates independently in its adjudicative functions.

== Leadership ==
The department is headed by a commissioner appointed by the Governor of Georgia. Recent commissioners have included:

- Shawn Ryan (2017–2019)
- Alex Atwood (2019–2021)
- Rebecca Sullivan (2022–present)

Sullivan previously served as the department's general counsel and assistant commissioner of government affairs before her appointment by Governor Brian Kemp in January 2022. During Atwood's tenure, a 2021 state audit found that the Georgia Department of Labor had cited a phone call with Atwood as the basis for an unauthorized, more than $1 million COVID-19-era employee meal program that the state inspector general later characterized as wasteful; DOAS's purchasing-card rules require its approval for purchases exceeding standard limits.

== ERP modernization ==
Beginning in the early 2020s, DOAS partnered with Georgia's State Accounting Office, the Governor's Office of Planning and Budget, and the Georgia Technology Authority on the "NextGen Project," an effort to replace the state's PeopleSoft-based TeamWorks enterprise resource planning system, in use since 1998, with a cloud-based platform branded GA@WORK. DOAS's State Purchasing and Human Resources Administration divisions led configuration of the new system's procurement and human-capital-management functions, which began deploying to state agencies in 2025.

== Headquarters ==
DOAS is headquartered in the James H. "Sloppy" Floyd Building, commonly known as the Twin Towers, at 200 Piedmont Avenue SE in downtown Atlanta, near the Georgia State Capitol.

== See also ==
- Government of Georgia (U.S. state)
- Georgia Department of Revenue
- Georgia State Capitol
