= Barry Klarberg =

American businessman (born 1961)

Barry J. Klarberg
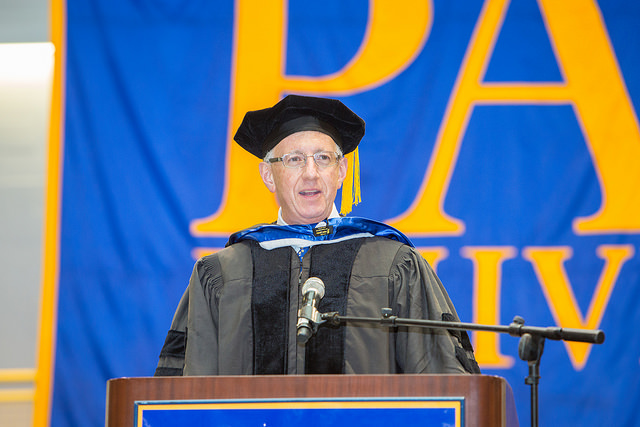
- Barry Klarberg at 2015 Pace University Commencement
- Born: March 4, 1961 (age 65); Rockaway, Queens, New York, U.S.
- Occupations: Entertainment & Sports Business Manager and Limited Partner of the New York Yankees
- Partner: Sara Herbert (married 2018)
- Children: 6

Barry J. Klarberg (born March 4, 1961) is an American businessman. He is a professional business and wealth manager for athletes, entertainers, and high-net-worth individuals. He was the founder and CEO of Monarch Business and Wealth Management, a full-service firm and family office that specializes in providing business and wealth management services.

In January 2022, Klarberg became President and Senior Managing Director at MAI Capital Management.

Klarberg has managed several prominent individuals including musician/actor Justin Timberlake, television sports personality Stephen A. Smith, Grammy Award winner and Rock and Roll Hall of Fame inductee Journey, music group NSYNC, world champion boxer Devin Haney, 2022 NFL Hall of Fame inductee Sam Mills, artist Alec Monopoly, DJ and record producer Kaskade, MLB All-Star Robinson Canó, NASCAR champion Kyle Busch, DJ and record producer John Summit, professional tennis player/model Anna Kournikova, NBA All-Star Kyle Lowry, MLB All-Star and Homerun Champion José Bautista, professional soccer player Jozy Altidore, NBA analyst and entrepreneur Jay Williams, MLS All-Star and Captain of the United States men's national soccer team Michael Bradley, and NHL Hall-of-Famer Mark Messier.

Klarberg holds an ownership stake in four American professional sports franchises. He is an owner of the New York Yankees, being a Partner since 2011. Klarberg is an owner of the Major League Soccer (MLS) team New York City FC. In 2023, Klarberg also became an owner of the United States SailGP Team.

He regularly appears on CNN, CNBC and The Wall Street Journal Report, and authored the book "Winning Tax Strategies and Planning for Athletes and Entertainers." Klarberg has also been elected to the Sports Business Journal's "Forty Under 40," as he was selected as one of the forty most influential executives in the sports business under the age of 40.

In April 2016, Klarberg represented NFL star Rob Gronkowski and launched with Monster Energy a signature beverage "Gronk" that will be distributed by Coca-Cola.

In May 2016, Klarberg shaped Tom Brady’s new Simmons Beautyrest Black luxury mattress ad campaign, aiding Simmons’ marketing team in pitching the campaign to the three-time Super Bowl MVP.

In April 2021, Klarberg represented Bethenny Frankel in signing a multi-year deal with iHeartRadio to bring the podcast “Just B with Bethenny Frankel” to the iHeartPodcast Network.

Klarberg was commissioned the honorary title Kentucky Colonel, the highest honor awarded by the Commonwealth of Kentucky, by Kentucky Governor Steven Beshear.

In 2015, Klarberg gave the commencement address at alma mater Pace University to the undergraduate Class of 2015 and received an honorary doctorate degree. Klarberg also returned to Pace University as an Executive-in-Residence and a Lecturer-in-Residence at the Lubin School of Business. Klarberg is a member of the President's Council at Pace University.

== Education and early career ==
Klarberg received his BBA (1981) and MS in Taxation (1985) from Pace University. He was an adjunct professor of Taxation at Pace University from 1985–1989. Klarberg began his career at Deloitte in 1981, where he spent 11 years. At Deloitte, he was the National Director of Sports and Entertainment. In 1992, Klarberg formed KRT Business Management, specializing in professional wealth management services, which he eventually sold to Assante Wealth Management Services.

Preceding Monarch, Klarberg spent two years as Senior Managing Director at Guggenheim Partners. In this role, Klarberg headed up Guggenheim Wealth Services' New York office.

== Monarch Business & Wealth Management ==
Klarberg was the founder of Monarch Business & Wealth Management, a financial and life management company and family office that represents professional athletes, internationally acclaimed entertainers and high-net-worth families. He currently manages television sports personality Stephen A. Smith, rock band Journey, world champion boxer Devin Haney, 2022 NFL Hall of Fame inductee Sam Mills, artist Alec Monopoly, DJ and record producer Kaskade, MLB All-Star Robinson Canó, several top NASCAR drivers, DJ and record producer John Summit, Anna Kournikova, MLB All-Star C. J. Wilson, MLB All-Star and Homerun Champion José Bautista, professional soccer player Jozy Altidore, and NHL Hall-of-Famer Mark Messier, amongst others. In 2011, Asset Alliance Corporation, a New York-based private equity firm with more than $1 billion under management, acquired an equity interest in Monarch Business & Wealth Management.

In 2012, the Sports Business Journal reported on Klarberg's expansion of Monarch Management. The report of this expansion included Klarberg's proposed acquisition of Miami-based ASF Consulting, a firm owned by Allen Furst that represents several current and former MLB and NBA players, including Roy Hibbert, Jeff Green and Alonzo Mourning. Klarberg further expanded Monarch when he hired former Major League Baseball starting pitcher and United States Olympian Kris Benson as Managing Director at Monarch Business & Wealth Management.

In 2013, CertusBank, a nationally chartered bank with nearly $2 billion in assets, made a strategic investment in Monarch.

In April 2016, Klarberg represented NFL star Rob Gronkowski and launched with Monster Energy a signature beverage "Gronk" that will be distributed by Coca-Cola.

In 2016, Josh Klein became a partner in Monarch, whose clients include The Chainsmokers, Big Sean, Logic, DJ Snake and Kelly Rowland.

In January 2022, Klarberg sold Monarch Business & Wealth Management, a financial planning firm for high net-worth individuals, to MAI Capital Management, a company with $12.2B assets under management. Klarberg serves as Regional President and Senior Managing Director at MAI Capital Management. MIA Capital Management promoted Klarberg's son Matt Klarberg, whose clients include John Summit, Tokischa, and Devin Haney, to Managing Director of Entertainment.

== New York Yankees and Yankees Global Enterprises ==
In September 2011, Klarberg became a Limited Partner of the New York Yankees. Teaming up with former Glencore oil commodities trader Ray Bartoszek, the two currently hold an ownership interest in Yankee Global Enterprises including a stake in the Yankees Entertainment & Sports Network (YES Network). In 2013, Klarberg also became an owner of Major League Soccer team New York City FC.

== Personal life ==
Klarberg is a resident of Greenwich, Connecticut. He is currently married to charity consultant Sara Herbert-Galloway.

== Community involvement ==
Klarberg is actively involved in various charity and community activities including the National Meningitis Association, the USO, and Homeland Security's Federal Enforcement Foundation. In 2011, Klarberg was selected as an Executive Committee Member of the USO Entertainment Advisory Council, which helps brings professional athletes and entertainers overseas to visit American soldiers.

In April 2012, Klarberg, along with Sara Herbert, was honored with the National Meningitis Association Nancy Ford Springer Inspiration Award for his long-standing support of NMA’s fight against the vaccine-preventable disease.

In 2012, Klarberg was selected as a member of the 2014 NY/NJ Super Bowl XLVIII Host Committee.

Klarberg and sons Matt and Ryan Klarberg were commissioned the honorary title Kentucky Colonel, the highest honor awarded by the Commonwealth of Kentucky, in 2012 by Kentucky Governor Steven Beshear, in recognition of their noteworthy accomplishments and outstanding service to the greater community.

In 2015, Klarberg gave the commencement address at alma mater Pace University to the undergraduate Class of 2015 and received an honorary doctorate degree. Klarberg also returned to Pace University as an Executive-in-Residence and a Lecturer-in-Residence at the Lubin School of Business.

Klarberg is a member of the President's Council at Pace University.

Since 2017, Klarberg taught "Business Developments in Sports" in the Sport Management Program at the University of Michigan in Ann Arbor, which regularly features celebrity guest lecturers. In September 2024, Big Noon Kickoff featured Klarberg's sports management class in a segment starring Mark Ingram II and Urban Meyer. Also in September 2024, recording artist and DJ John Summit lectured at Klarberg's class.

In Fall 2024, Klarberg lectured at the London School of Economics as a three-part series discussing business development in sports.
