= Georgia Department of Banking and Finance =

State financial regulatory agency in Georgia, United States

Department overview
- Formed: August 16, 1919; 106 years ago
- Preceding Department: Department of Banking (1919–1972)
- Jurisdiction: Georgia
- Headquarters: 2990 Brandywine Road, Suite 200; Atlanta, Georgia 30341
- Department executive: Oscar "Bo" Fears III, Commissioner
- Website: dbf.georgia.gov

The Georgia Department of Banking and Finance (DBF) is a state agency of Georgia responsible for chartering, licensing, regulating, and examining the state's state-chartered banks, credit unions, trust companies, bank holding companies, and merchant acquirer limited purpose banks, as well as licensing and regulating non-depository entities such as mortgage lenders and brokers, consumer installment lenders, money transmitters, check cashers, and (beginning in 2026) litigation financiers. The department is headquartered in Atlanta and is headed by a commissioner appointed by the Governor of Georgia.

It shares regulatory responsibility for state-chartered institutions with federal counterparts, including the Federal Deposit Insurance Corporation (FDIC), the Federal Reserve, and the National Credit Union Administration (NCUA), and it is the sole state regulator of mortgage lenders, mortgage brokers, consumer installment lenders, and money service businesses operating in Georgia. The department does not regulate national banks or federal credit unions.

== History ==
=== Origins (1895–1920) ===
Before a dedicated banking agency existed, oversight of Georgia banks was vested in the State Treasurer, who also held the position of State Bank Examiner. A revision of state law in 1895 scattered banking provisions throughout the Georgia Code, and an 1892 constitutional amendment shifted bank chartering from individual legislative acts to general incorporation law. Georgia Bankers Association (GBA) general counsel Orville A. Park published a compilation of banking statutes in 1908 to address the resulting disorder, and the Act of 1907 contained the first legislative reference to a separate state "Bank Bureau," though the proposal stalled for over a decade, largely over how to fund a standalone State Treasurer's office once banking duties were removed from it.

A constitutional amendment increasing the State Treasurer's salary, ratified in 1919, cleared the way for a complete revision of Georgia's banking statutes and the creation of an independent banking department. The General Assembly created the Department of Banking by act approved August 16, 1919. The new department began active operation the following year, with T. R. Bennett named as Georgia's first State Superintendent of Banks in 1920.

=== Reorganization and the Financial Institutions Code (1972–1974) ===
In 1972, the General Assembly reorganized and renamed the agency as the Department of Banking and Finance, with the agency thereafter headed by a commissioner. In 1974, the General Assembly enacted the Financial Institutions Code of Georgia, a comprehensive recodification and modernization of the state's banking, trust, and financial-institution laws — the first since 1919 — which remains, as amended, the core of the department's statutory authority under Title 7 of the Official Code of Georgia Annotated.

=== Bank failures during the Great Recession (2008–2012) ===
Georgia's banking sector, swelled during the 2000s real-estate boom by a large number of small, newly chartered banks concentrated in metropolitan Atlanta, was hit harder by the 2008 financial crisis than that of any other state. Beginning in 2008, the department closed a series of state-chartered banks in cooperation with the FDIC, which was named receiver in each case, including First Georgia Community Bank (2008), Georgian Bank (2009), Patriot Bank and Creekside Bank (2011), and Central Bank of Georgia (2012). By the count of data provider Trepp LLC, Georgia recorded more bank failures than any other U.S. state in the years following the crisis, exceeding the next-closest states by a wide margin. Several failures led to federal prosecutions of bank officers and directors for fraud, including at Integrity Bank in Alpharetta, the First National Bank of Savannah, and Omni National Bank in Atlanta.

== Organization and regulatory jurisdiction ==
The department is led by a commissioner who is appointed by the governor and supported by several deputy commissioners overseeing supervision of depository institutions, non-depository financial institutions, legal affairs, and administration. Its work is generally organized into a depository division, which regulates and examines state-chartered banks, credit unions, trust companies, bank holding companies, merchant acquirer limited purpose banks, and foreign banking organizations, and a non-depository division, which licenses and examines mortgage brokers and lenders, mortgage loan originators, consumer installment lenders, money transmitters, check cashers, and (as of 2026) litigation financiers.

The department's stated mission is "to promote safe, sound, competitive financial services in Georgia through innovative, responsive regulation and supervision," with a vision "to support vibrant economic growth and prosperity in Georgia."

The department is a member of the Conference of State Bank Supervisors (CSBS), the national organization of state banking regulators; a former Georgia commissioner served as CSBS chairman in 2020.

== Litigation financier regulation (2025–2026) ==
In April 2025, Governor Brian Kemp signed Senate Bill 69, the "Georgia Courts Access and Consumer Protection Act," as part of a broader tort-reform package. The act, sponsored by state senator John F. Kennedy, requires companies engaged in third-party litigation financing in Georgia to register with the Department of Banking and Finance, bars financiers affiliated with designated foreign adversaries from operating in the state, mandates consumer disclosures, and makes the existence of litigation funding agreements discoverable in civil litigation. Most provisions, including the registration requirement administered by the department, took effect January 1, 2026; the department uses the Nationwide Multistate Licensing System to process litigation financier registrations.

== List of commissioners ==
Since the office of commissioner was established in 1972, individuals who have led the department include, in order:

- E. D. "Jack" Dunn
- Steve Bridges
- David Sorrell
- Rob Braswell (December 2005 – June 2013)
- Kevin Hagler (July 1, 2013 – August 31, 2025)
- Oscar "Bo" Fears III (September 1, 2025 – present)

This list is sourced to a 2019 retrospective by the Georgia Bankers Association and subsequent reporting; precise tenure dates for commissioners prior to Braswell have not been independently confirmed.

== See also ==
- Government of Georgia (U.S. state)
- List of Georgia state agencies
- Bank regulation in the United States
- Conference of State Bank Supervisors
