= Georgia Department of Juvenile Justice =

State agency of Georgia, United States

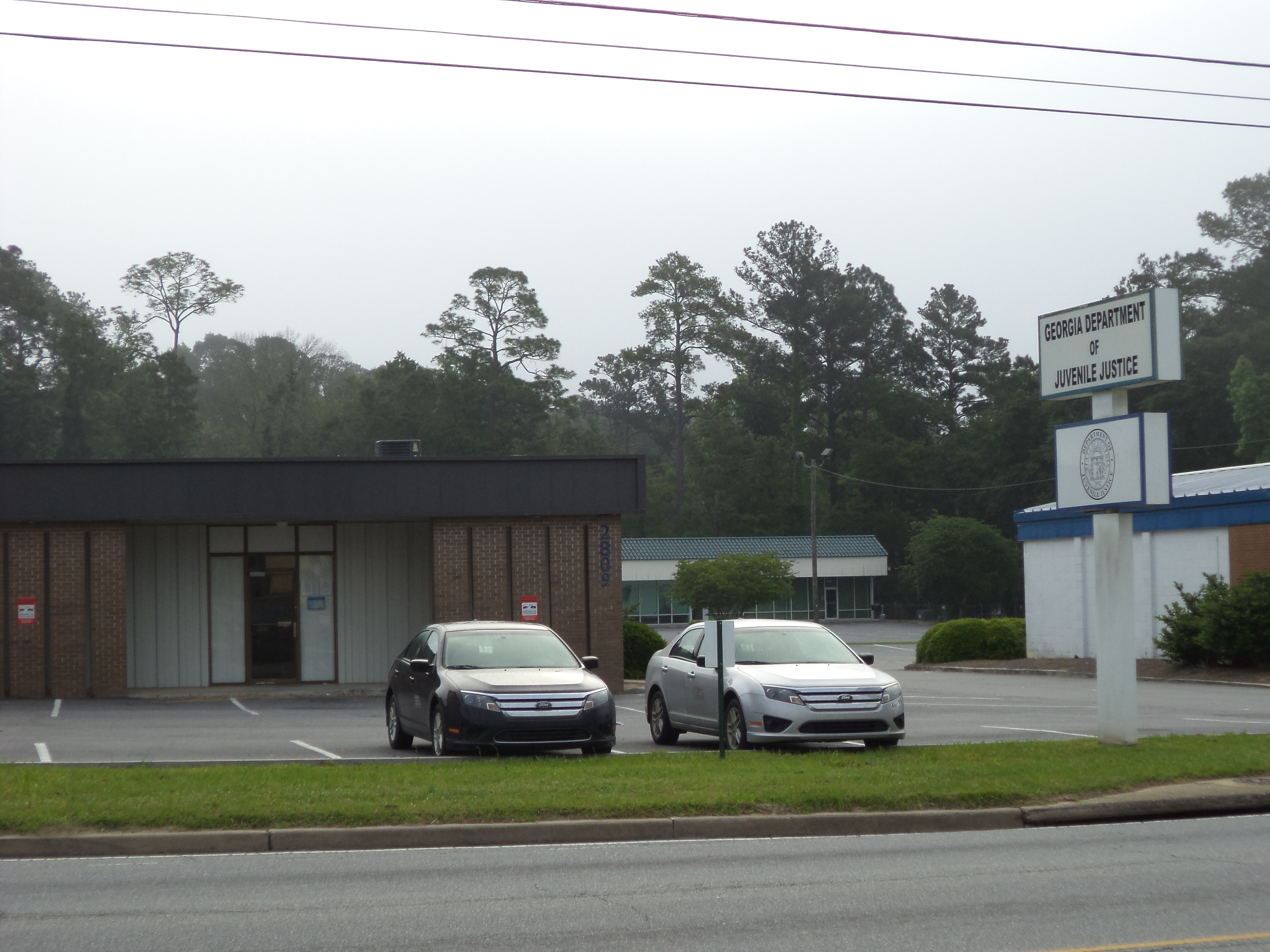
- Georgia Department of Juvenile Justice, Valdosta, Lowndes County, Georgia

Agency overview
- Jurisdiction: Georgia, United States
- Headquarters: Avondale Estates
- Website: Georgia Department of Juvenile Justice

The Georgia Department of Juvenile Justice (DJJ) is a state agency of Georgia, United States, headquartered in Avondale Estates, near Decatur and in Metro Atlanta. The agency operates juvenile correctional facilities.

The department was under federal oversight for 11 years after the U.S. Justice Department investigated reports of overcrowding and abuse. In 2009 the U.S. Department of Justice ended oversight of the DJJ.

== Facilities ==
The DJJ operates six youth development campuses (YDCs), which house children sentenced to or committed to the DJJ by juvenile courts. The DJJ also operates 22 regional youth detention centers (RYDCs), which house children awaiting trial in a juvenile or superior court or awaiting placement into another facility. Both types of facilities are grouped into four regions: northeast, northwest, southeast and southwest.

=== Youth development campuses ===
The youth development campuses include:

- Augusta Youth Development Campus (Augusta)
- Eastman Youth Development Campus (Dodge County, partially in Eastman, partially in an unincorporated area)
- Macon Youth Development Campus (Unincorporated Bibb County)
- Muscogee Youth Development Campus (Columbus)
- Savannah River Challenge Program (Unincorporated Screven County)
- Sumter Youth Development Campus (Unincorporated Sumter County)

Macon, which opened in 1970, is all girls and the only YDC facility for girls in the DJJ.

=== Regional youth detention centers ===
A youth is assigned to regional youth detention centers according to the county of offense and that county's catchment area. The RYDCs include:

- Albany Regional Youth Detention Center (Albany) - Dougherty and Terrell counties
- Augusta Regional Youth Detention Center (Unincorporated Richmond County) - Burke, Columbia, Glascock, Jenkins, Lincoln, McDuffie, Richmond, Screven, Taliaferro, Warren, and Wilkes counties
- Blakely Regional Youth Detention Center
- Claxton Regional Youth Detention Center
- Martha K. Glaze Regional Youth Detention Center (formerly Clayton Regional Youth Detention Center) (Lovejoy) - Clayton and Fayette counties
- Crisp Regional Youth Detention Center
- Aaron Cohn Regional Youth Detention Center
- DeKalb Regional Youth Detention Center (Unincorporated DeKalb County) - DeKalb County
- Eastman Regional Youth Detention Center
- Gainesville Regional Youth Detention Center
- Griffin Regional Youth Detention Center (Griffin) - Henry and Spalding counties
- Gwinnett Regional Youth Detention Center (Unincorporated Gwinnett County) - Gwinnett and Rockdale counties
- Judge Thomas Jefferson Loftiss II Regional Youth Detention Center (Unincorporated Thomas County) - Brooks, Colquitt, Echols, Grady, Lowndes, and Thomas counties
- Macon Regional Youth Detention Center (Unincorporated Bibb County) - Bibb, Butts, Crawford, Jones, Lamar, Monroe, Peach, Twiggs, Upson, and Wilkinson counties
- Marietta Regional Youth Detention Center (Unincorporated Cobb County) - Cobb County
- Metro Regional Youth Detention Center (Unincorporated DeKalb County) - Fulton County
- Paulding Regional Youth Detention Center
- Bob Richards Regional Youth Detention Center
- Sandersville Regional Youth Detention Center
- Savannah Regional Youth Detention Center (Savannah) - Chatham and McIntosh)
- Elbert Shaw Regional Youth Detention Center (formerly Dalton Regional Youth Detention Center) (Dalton) - Catoosa, Dade, Fannin, Gilmer, Murray, Pickens, and Whitfield counties
- Waycross Regional Youth Detention Center
- Rockdale County Youth Detention Center
