= Georgia Department of Revenue =

Tax collection agency in the U.S. state of Georgia

Agency overview
- Formed: March 1, 1938; 88 years ago
- Jurisdiction: State of Georgia
- Headquarters: 2595 Century Parkway NE; Atlanta, Georgia 30345
- Agency executives: David Burge, State Revenue Commissioner; Chester Cook, Deputy State Revenue Commissioner
- Website: dor.georgia.gov

The Georgia Department of Revenue (DOR or GDOR) is the principal tax collection agency in the U.S. state of Georgia. The department administers the state's tax laws, enforces laws and regulations concerning alcoholic beverages and tobacco products, and performs motor vehicle tag and title administration. The department is headquartered in Atlanta, Georgia.

== History ==
The Georgia Department of Revenue was created in 1938, becoming the state's primary tax-collecting agency. In January 2025, the department relocated its headquarters from 1800 Century Blvd NE in the Chamblee area of Atlanta to 2595 Century Parkway NE, also in Atlanta, as part of an effort to make department operations more accessible to the public.

== Organization and leadership ==
The department is led by a State Revenue Commissioner appointed by the Governor of Georgia. As of 2026, the commissioner is David Burge, who was appointed by Governor Brian P. Kemp and took office February 16, 2026, succeeding Frank O'Connell, who left to become the state's first Tax Court Chief Judge. O'Connell had served as commissioner since February 2023, following more than two decades with the department. Burge, an attorney and partner at the Atlanta law firm Smith, Gambrell & Russell, previously served on the Georgia Department of Community Affairs board, including as its chair and vice-chair, and is a member of the State Ethics Commission. Chester Cook serves as Deputy State Revenue Commissioner, a role he assumed in 2023 after joining the department in 2005.

== Organization and functions ==
The department organizes its work into several functional areas, including Taxes, Motor Vehicles, Alcohol & Tobacco, Local Government Services, and the Unclaimed Property Program. The Compliance Division audits tax accounts, enforces compliance with state tax law, conducts taxpayer education, and assists in tax collection, while the Local Government Services Division administers property tax laws and oversees much of the local county property tax assessment and collection process. The Alcohol and Tobacco Division administers licensing and enforcement related to the manufacture, distribution, and sale of alcoholic beverages and tobacco products in the state, and the Motor Vehicle Division is responsible for vehicle titling, registration, and license plate issuance.

== See also ==
- Georgia Department of Community Health
- Taxation in the United States
