= R & G Financial Corporation =

Former financial holding company in Puerto Rico

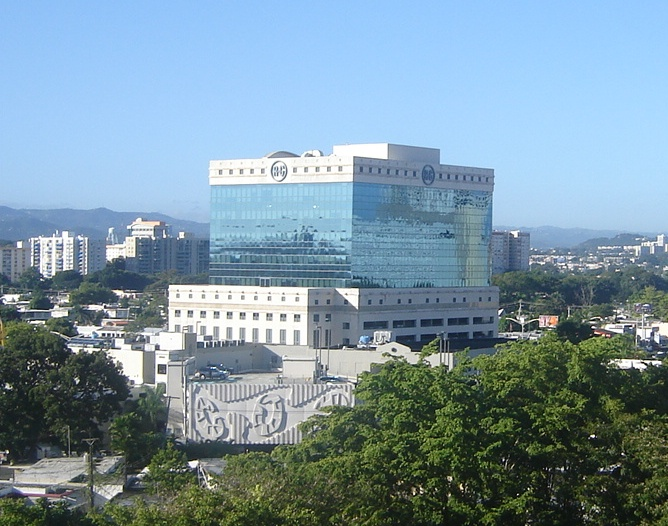
- R & G Financial Corporation headquarters in Hato Rey, Puerto Rico, later served as Scotiabank's Puerto Rico headquarters until its acquisition by OFG Bancorp in 2019
- Type: public
- Industry: Finance and Insurance
- Founded: 1966; San Juan, Puerto Rico
- Defunct: April 30, 2010
- Fate: The Office of the Commissioner of Financial Institutions of Puerto Rico seized it and appointed the FDIC to become the failed bank's receiver.
- Successor: Scotiabank
- Headquarters: San Juan, Puerto Rico
- Key people: Victor J. Galán, Chairman & CEO
- Products: Banking, checking accounts, insurance, stock brokerage, investment banking, asset-based lending, consumer finance

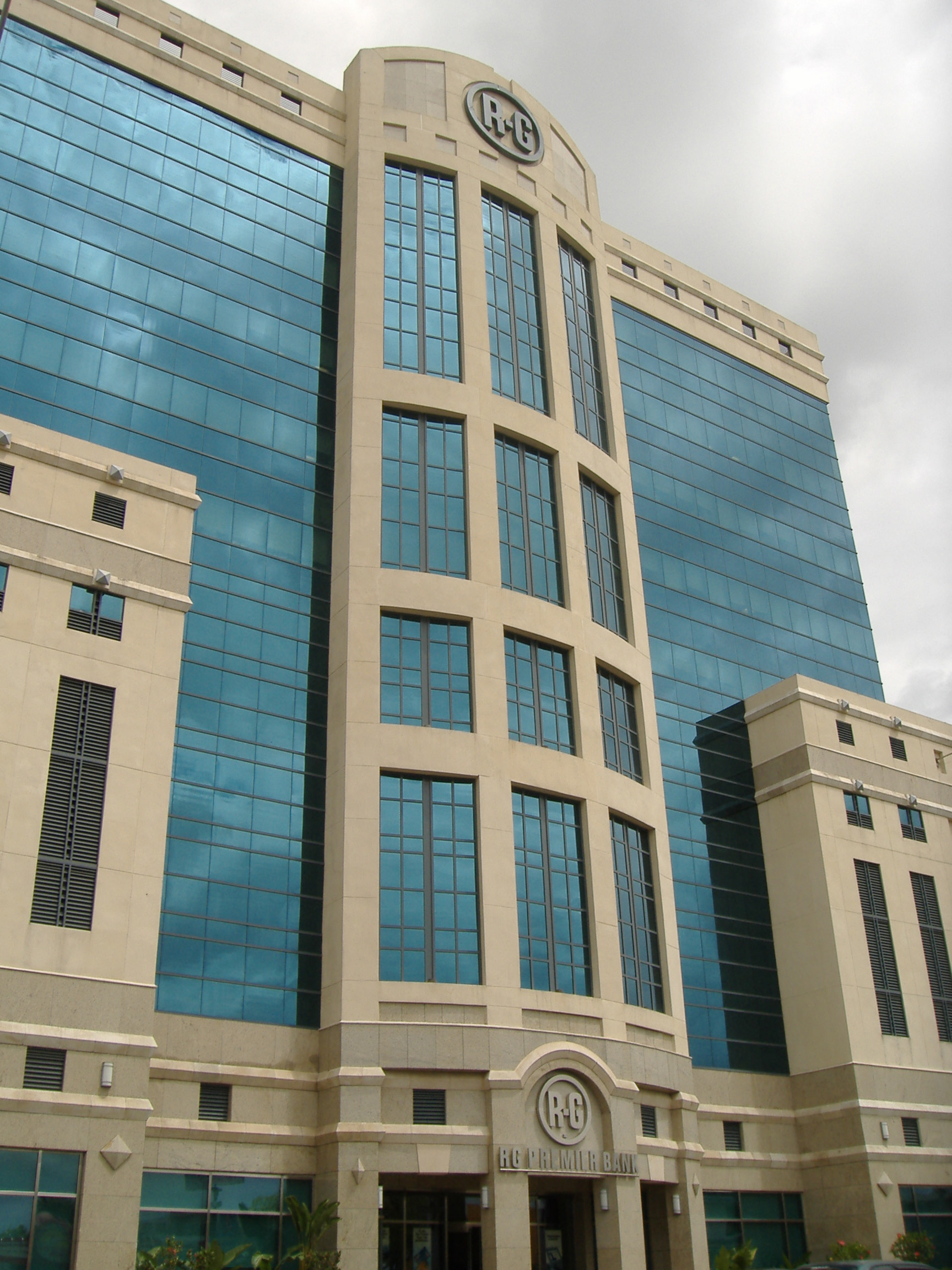
Front facade of the R & G Financial Corporation headquarters.

The R & G Financial Corporation (commonly known as RG Financial or R-G Financial) was a financial holding company located in San Juan, Puerto Rico. On April 30, 2010, its bank failed and its deposits and assets were seized by the Federal Deposit Insurance Corporation (FDIC). Its deposits and assets were subsequently sold to Scotiabank. On May 14, R & G Financial Corporation filed for Chapter 11 bankruptcy.

RG used to offer a full range of financial services in Puerto Rico and the State of Florida through its wholly owned subsidiaries. Its main subsidiaries were RG Premier Bank, a business and consumer financial services company offering banking services, trust and brokerage services, and various types of loans, and RG Mortgage, which was one of the largest mortgage lenders in the island. Its headquarters were located at 290 Jesús T. Piñero Avenue in Hato Rey, San Juan.

== Summary ==
RG Financial Corp's chief assets and sources of income are its commercial loans (which mainly consist of commercial real estate loans and construction loans), consumer loans (which mainly consist of auto loans, personal loans and credit card loans), and residential mortgage loans. RG Financial offers banking services through a network of 66 branches (2005) between two of its subsidiaries, the largest being RG Premier Bank in Puerto Rico and the second being RG Crown Bank in the Orlando, Tampa and St. Petersburg cities of Florida.

In an effort to compete with larger banks within Puerto Rico and Florida, RG Financial has acquired various banking and lending institutions in order to expand to new markets and improve its services in existing ones. On June 29, 1993, it acquired Caribbean Federal Savings Bank of Puerto Rico, followed by the Fajardo Federal Savings Bank on August 5, 1998, then Continental Capital Corp. on October 7, 1999, and finally Crown Group, Inc. on June 7, 2002. Additionally, RG Financial acquired various other assets and rights from other financial companies, such as 18 bank branches from Wachovia Corporation in 2004, and mortgage servicing rights from Banco Santander in 1998.

By 2004, the company had over $10.20 billion in assets and approximately 2,404 employees.

== Competitors (in Puerto Rico) ==
- Banco Bilbao Vizcaya Argentaria
- Banco Popular de Puerto Rico
- Banco Santander
- Doral Bank
- EuroBancshares
- FirstBank
- Oriental Financial Group, Inc.
- Scotiabank
- Westernbank
