= EuroBancshares =

Former financial holding company located in Puerto Rico

EuroBancshares, Inc.
- Formerly: Española de Finanzas Trust Company (1979–1988); First Community Trust Company (1988–1990)
- Company type: Public
- Industry: Finance and Insurance
- Founded: San Juan, Puerto Rico; December 4, 1979
- Defunct: April 30, 2010
- Fate: The Office of the Commissioner of Financial Institutions of Puerto Rico seized it and appointed the FDIC to become the failed bank's receiver. The FDIC sold the deposits and assets to Oriental Bank and Trust.
- Headquarters: San Juan, Puerto Rico
- Key people: Rafael Arillaga-Torréns, Jr, Chairman, President & CEO,
- Products: Banking; Checking accounts Insurance; Stock brokerage Investment bank Asset-based lending Consumer finance
- Total assets: US$2.65 billion (Q1 2009)
- Website: www.eurobankpr.com (Archive)

EuroBancshares, Inc. (commonly known as Eurobank) was a financial holding company founded on December 4, 1979 under the name of Española de Finanzas Trust Company in San Juan, Puerto Rico. On April 30, 2010, the bank failed and its deposits and assets were seized by the Federal Deposit Insurance Corporation (FDIC). Its deposits and assets were subsequently sold to Oriental Bank and Trust.

EuroBank used to offer financial and insurance services in Puerto Rico through its wholly owned subsidiaries Eurobank Puerto Rico and EuroSeguros, respectively. Since its founding, it grew into a billion dollar financial institution, eventually operating through a network of 21 branches in 2005. Its headquarters were located at 270 Muñoz Rivera Avenue, near the Golden Mile District or "Milla de Oro" of Hato Rey, San Juan.

== History ==
Over the years, the name of the institution changed on various occasions. In 1988, after 9 years of operating under the name Española de Finanzas Trust Company, its name was changed to First Community Trust Company. In 1990, following the change in business strategy to lending activities focused on lines of credit to businesses and business loans to individuals of high net worth, the company changed its name to Eurobank & Trust Company. The company changed its name to EuroBancshares shortly thereafter. In view of the rapidly expanding residential home mortgage market in Puerto Rico, Eurobank established a Mortgage Division in late quarter 1999. However, after the 2008 financial crisis, the company suffered adversely, and on April 30, 2010, its deposits and assets were seized by the Federal Deposit Insurance Corporation (FDIC).

== Subsidiaries ==
- Eurobank Puerto Rico
- Euromortgage
- Euroleasing
- EuroSeguros

== Competitors (in Puerto Rico) ==
- Banco Bilbao Vizcaya Argentaria
- Banco Popular de Puerto Rico
- Banco Santander
- Citibank
- Doral Bank
- FirstBank
- Oriental Financial Group, Inc.
- RG Premier Bank
- Scotiabank
- Westernbank
