= List of largest bank failures in the United States =

Since the 1970s, over 90 banks in the United States with US$1 billion or more in assets have failed. The list below is based on assets at the time of failure of banks insured by the Federal Deposit Insurance Corporation.

Bank	City	State	Year	Assets at time of failure		Ref.
Bank	City	State	Year	Nominal	Inflation-adjusted (2024)	Ref.
Washington Mutual	Seattle	Washington	2008	$307 billion	$448 billion	
First Republic Bank	San Francisco	California	2023	$229 billion	$229 billion	
Silicon Valley Bank	Santa Clara	California	2023	$209 billion	$209 billion	
Signature Bank	New York	New York	2023	$118 billion	$118 billion	
Continental Illinois National Bank and Trust	Chicago	Illinois	1984	$40.0 billion	$121 billion	
First Republic Bank Corporation	Dallas	Texas	1988	$32.5 billion	$86 billion	
American Savings and Loan	Stockton	California	1988	$30.2 billion	$80 billion	
Bank of New England	Boston	Massachusetts	1991	$21.7 billion	$50 billion	
IndyMac	Pasadena	California	2008	$32.0 billion	$47 billion	
MCorp	Dallas	Texas	1989	$18.5 billion	$47 billion	
Gibraltar Savings and Loan	Simi Valley	California	1989	$15.1 billion	$38 billion	
Colonial Bank	Montgomery	Alabama	2009	$25.0 billion	$37 billion	
First City National Bank	Houston	Texas	1988	$13.0 billion	$35 billion	
HomeFed Bank	San Diego	California	1992	$12.2 billion	$27 billion	
FBOP Corp banking subsidiaries	Oak Park	Illinois	2009	$18.4 billion	$27 billion	
Southeast Bank	Miami	Florida	1991	$10.5 billion	$24 billion	
City Federal Savings and Loan	Elizabeth	New Jersey	1989	$9.8 billion	$25 billion	
Goldome	Buffalo	New York	1991	$9.9 billion	$23 billion	
Imperial Federal Savings Assoc.	San Diego	California	1990	$9.6 billion	$23 billion	
Franklin National Bank	New York	New York	1974	$3.7 billion	$24 billion	
Great American Bank	San Diego	California	1991	$9.5 billion	$22 billion	
CenTrust Bank	Miami	Florida	1990	$8.2 billion	$20 billion	
Empire of America Savings	Buffalo	New York	1990	$8.2 billion	$20 billion	
Guaranty Bank	Austin	Texas	2009	$13.0 billion	$19 billion	
Downey Savings and Loan	Newport Beach	California	2008	$12.8 billion	$19 billion	
BankUnited FSB	Coral Gables	Florida	2009	$12.8 billion	$19 billion	
AmTrust Bank	Cleveland	Ohio	2009	$12.0 billion	$18 billion	
WesternBank	Mayagüez	Puerto Rico	2010	$11.9 billion	$17 billion	
Gibraltar Savings Association	Houston	Texas	1988	$6.5 billion	$17 billion	
United Commercial Bank	San Francisco	California	2009	$11.2 billion	$16 billion	
Crossland Savings Bank	Brooklyn	New York	1992	$7.4 billion	$17 billion	
The Connecticut Bank & Trust Co.	Hartford	Connecticut	1991	$7.2 billion	$17 billion	
MeraBank	Phoenix	Arizona	1990	$6.3 billion	$15 billion	
Sunbelt Savings	Irving	Texas	1991	$6.0 billion	$14 billion	
Western Savings and Loan	Phoenix	Arizona	1989	$5.7 billion	$14 billion	
Columbia Savings & Loan Assn.	Beverly Hills	California	1991	$5.4 billion	$12 billion	
Lincoln Savings and Loan Association	Irvine	California	1989	$4.9 billion	$12 billion	
California National Bank	Los Angeles	California	2009	$7.8 billion	$11.4 billion	
Corus Bank	Chicago	Illinois	2009	$7.0 billion	$10.3 billion	
United States National Bank	San Diego	California	1973	$1.3 billion	$9.2 billion	
First Federal Bank of California	Santa Monica	California	2009	$6.1 billion	$8.9 billion	
R-G Premier Bank of Puerto Rico	Hato Rey	Puerto Rico	2010	$5.9 billion	$8.5 billion	
Doral Bank	San Juan	Puerto Rico	2015	$5.9 billion	$7.8 billion	
Franklin Bank	Houston	Texas	2008	$5.1 billion	$7.4 billion	
Silverton Bank	Atlanta	Georgia	2009	$4.1 billion	$6 billion	
Imperial Capital Bank	La Jolla	California	2009	$4.0 billion	$5.9 billion	
PFF Bank & Trust	Pomona	California	2008	$3.7 billion	$5.4 billion	
La Jolla Bank	La Jolla	California	2010	$3.6 billion	$5.2 billion	
Frontier Bank	Everett	Washington	2010	$3.5 billion	$5 billion	
First National Bank of Nevada	Reno	Nevada	2008	$3.4 billion	$5 billion	
Amcore Bank	Rockford	Illinois	2010	$3.4 billion	$4.9 billion	
Riverside National Bank of Florida	Fort Pierce	Florida	2010	$3.4 billion	$4.9 billion	
Midwest Bank and Trust Company	Elmwood Park	Illinois	2010	$3.2 billion	$4.6 billion	
First National Bank, also operating as The National Bank of El Paso	Edinburg	Texas	2013	$3.1 billion	$4.2 billion	
Superior Bank	Birmingham	Alabama	2011	$3.0 billion	$4.2 billion	
TierOne Bank	Lincoln	Nebraska	2010	$2.8 billion	$4 billion	
Irwin Union Bank and Trust Company	Columbus	Indiana	2009	$2.7 billion	$4 billion	
Orion Bank	Naples	Florida	2009	$2.7 billion	$4 billion	
EuroBank	San Juan	Puerto Rico	2010	$2.6 billion	$3.7 billion	
First Community Bank	Taos	New Mexico	2011	$2.3 billion	$3.2 billion	
Integra Bank, N.A.	Evansville	Indiana	2011	$2.2 billion	$3.1 billion	
ANB Financial	Bentonville	Arkansas	2008	$2.1 billion	$3.1 billion	
First Regional Bank	Los Angeles	California	2010	$2.1 billion	$3 billion	
ShoreBank	Chicago	Illinois	2010	$2.1 billion	$3 billion	
Silver State Bank	Henderson	Nevada	2008	$2.0 billion	$2.9 billion	
New Frontier Bank	Greeley	Colorado	2009	$2.0 billion	$2.9 billion	
Georgian Bank	Atlanta	Georgia	2009	$2.0 billion	$2.9 billion	
Vineyard Bank	Rancho Cucamonga	California	2009	$1.9 billion	$2.8 billion	
Peoples First Community Bank	Panama City	Florida	2009	$1.8 billion	$2.6 billion	
County Bank	Merced	California	2009	$1.7 billion	$2.5 billion	
Hillcrest Bank	Overland Park	Kansas	2010	$1.6 billion	$2.3 billion	
Advanta Bank Corp.	Draper	Utah	2010	$1.6 billion	$2.3 billion	
CF Bancorp	Port Huron	Michigan	2010	$1.6 billion	$2.3 billion	
Mutual Bank	Harvey	Illinois	2009	$1.6 billion	$2.3 billion	
Hamilton Bank	Miami	Florida	2002	$1.3 billion	$2.3 billion	
Community Bank of Nevada	Las Vegas	Nevada	2009	$1.5 billion	$2.2 billion	
First Bank of Beverly Hills	Calabasas	California	2009	$1.5 billion	$2.2 billion	
Temecula Valley Bank	Temecula	California	2009	$1.5 billion	$2.2 billion	
New South Federal Savings Bank	Irondale	Alabama	2009	$1.5 billion	$2.2 billion	
Community Banks of Colorado	Greenwood Village	Colorado	2011	$1.4 billion	$2 billion	
Horizon Bank	Bellingham	Washington	2010	$1.3 billion	$1.9 billion	
Premier Bank	Jefferson City	Missouri	2010	$1.2 billion	$1.7 billion	
Broadway Bank	Chicago	Illinois	2010	$1.2 billion	$1.7 billion	
Security Bank of Bibb County	Macon	Georgia	2009	$1.2 billion	$1.8 billion	
Charter Bank	Santa Fe	New Mexico	2010	$1.2 billion	$1.7 billion	
First National Bank of Keystone	Keystone	West Virginia	1999	$1.1 billion	$2.1 billion	
Alliance Bank	Culver City	California	2009	$1.1 billion	$1.6 billion	
City Bank	Lynnwood	Washington	2010	$1.1 billion	$1.6 billion	
Columbia River Bank	The Dalles	Oregon	2010	$1.1 billion	$1.6 billion	
Community Bank and Trust	Cornelia	Georgia	2010	$1.1 billion	$1.6 billion	
Integrity Bank	Alpharetta	Georgia	2008	$1.1 billion	$1.6 billion	
Affinity Bank	Ventura	California	2009	$1.0 billion	$1.5 billion	
Appalachian Community Bank	Ellijay	Georgia	2010	$1.0 billion	$1.4 billion	

== See also ==
- List of bank failures in the United States (2008–present)
- List of banks acquired or bankrupted in the United States during the 2008 financial crisis
- Too big to fail
