= W Holding Company =

Former financial holding corporation located in Puerto Rico

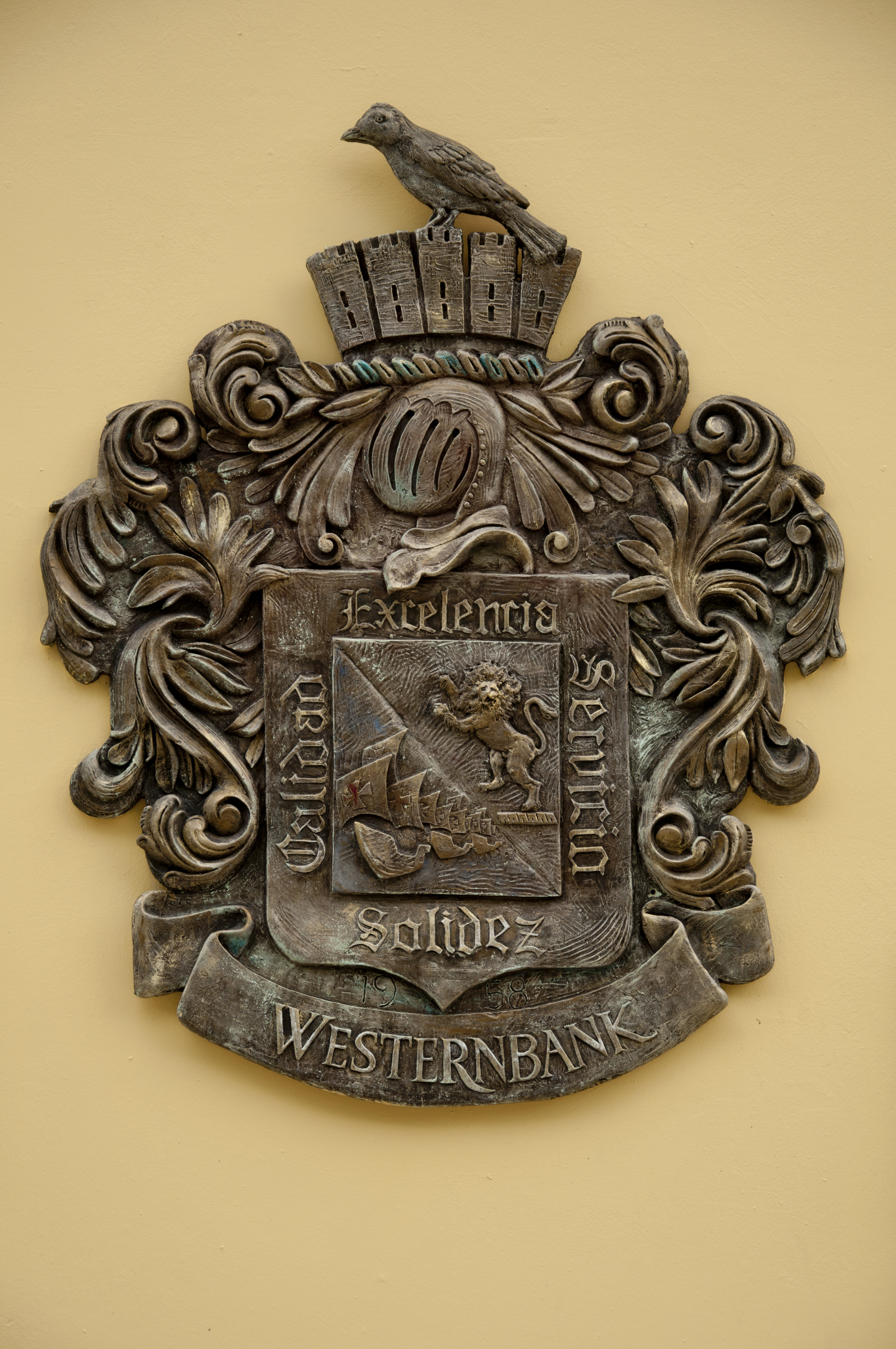
- Company type: Public
- Industry: Finance and Insurance
- Founded: Mayagüez, Puerto Rico, March 1, 1958; 68 years ago
- Defunct: April 30, 2010; 16 years ago
- Fate: The Office of the Commissioner of Financial Institutions of Puerto Rico seized it and appointed the FDIC to become the failed bank's receiver. The FDIC sold the deposits and assets to Banco Popular de Puerto Rico.
- Successor: Banco Popular
- Headquarters: Mayagüez, Puerto Rico
- Key people: Frank C. Stipes, Chairman & CEO
- Products: Banking, checking accounts, insurance, stock brokerage, investment banking, asset-based lending, consumer finance
- Website: Archive of www.wbpr.com/

The Westernbank logo. Its trademark El Banco del Pueblo is Spanish for The People’s Bank.

The W Holding Company was a financial holding corporation located in Mayagüez, Puerto Rico. On April 30, 2010, Westernbank, its wholly owned bank subsidiary, failed and its deposits and assets were seized by the Federal Deposit Insurance Corporation and subsequently sold to Banco Popular de Puerto Rico.

== History ==
Westernbank was founded on March 1, 1958, under the name Western Federal Savings and Loan Association of Puerto Rico in the western town of Mayagüez by Miguel A. García Méndez, a local statesman, businessman and experienced banker. With initial deposits reaching $250,000, the bank grew at a rapid rate, quadrupling its deposits and assets in less than nine months. By the early 1960s, Westernbank had expanded to the western and southwestern region of the island, with bank branches in the towns of Aguadilla, San Germán and Cabo Rojo.

Between 1978 and 1981, when the United States and Puerto Rican economies were suffering from high inflation rates, local banks were facing losses due to an increasing number in bankruptcies and unemployment rates, and some were forced to either close, merge, or sell portions of their assets. To counter these economic conditions, Westernbank applied conservative policies and banking practices that included tightening its credit lending criteria, assuming stricter loan to value ratios, favoring collateralized loans, and restructuring its assets and liabilities. In 1988, facing an impending recession in the US and Puerto Rico, Westernbank began applying the same conservative measures, to reduce inherent risks and protect the bank's capital position. During the following years, between 1989 and 1990, private and public savings banks on the island, with the exception of Westernbank, faced losses, restated their financial statements, and saw significant decreases in their stock prices.

Westernbank lending policies and practices focused mainly on mortgage residential loans rather than commercial and construction loans because, although commercial and construction loans offer a much higher rate of return, mortgage loans offer a much smaller risk of default. However, in 1994, after a revision of state bank laws, the company decided to diversify its loan portfolio and services by changing its charter to become a full-service commercial bank. This allowed the bank to experience significant increases in customers, bank branches, loans (which now included commercial and construction loans), and ultimately revenue, doubling its financial size every two and a half years without the need of consolidations or mergers during the 1990s.

=== W Holding Company ===
In 1999, Westernbank was reorganized to improve its services and to better represent its future plans and strategy. This reorganization created the parent company, W Holding, and converted its main divisions, such as Westernbank, into wholly owned subsidiaries. In July 2000, the company was officially converted into a financial holding company under the Bank Holding Company Act, which allowed it to engage in all financial related activities, including those with stricter regulatory standards than banking such as insurance and market securities.

In 2001, W Holding created Westernbank Insurance Corp., a general insurance agent. This move diversified the company's services while at the same time improving its investment portfolio, given that it could now place property, casualty, life and disability insurance while generating commission income. Most of the agency's volume derived from two areas: mortgage insurance on residential mortgage loans and credit life insurance for borrowers of personal loans, both of which were awarded by its sister company Westernbank.

In early 2002, W Holding acquired from Banco Popular de Puerto Rico a 23-story building previously known as the Hato Rey Tower or the Banco de Ponce headquarters, in the San Juan Hato Rey financial district, more commonly known as the "Golden Mile District" (La Milla de Oro in Spanish). After renovations and improvements were made to its facilities, the building was renamed the "Westernbank World Plaza", and then hosted the company's San Juan metropolitan area headquarters, its Westernbank Business Credit and Expresso divisions’ main offices and several other non-related tenants.

=== Before the acquisition by Banco Popular ===
Its main headquarters were located at 19 West Candelaria Street in Mayagüez, Puerto Rico, the town of the company's founding. Its main subsidiary, Westernbank, at one time operated 55 bank branches, all insured by the Federal Deposit Insurance Corporation. It had opened two bank branches in the Miramar and Old San Juan sections of the island's capital, which feature a new information system that allowed bank representatives to perform certain banking transactions with customers at informal places, such as the lobby area, the waiting area, and even in the customer waiting line for the teller counters.

== Recognitions ==
- Ranked 21st among the "Top 50 stocks of the 1990s" by Money.* Ranked as the "No. 1 Mid-Sized Bank" in the entire United States on Return On Equity (ROE) by U.S. Banker Magazine two years in a row (1997 and 1998).
- Westernbank was the only bank in Puerto Rico since the industry's inception in the 1850s, and one of a few in the United States, who had been profitable every single year since its founding.
- Rated "One of America’s Fastest Growing Companies" by Equities Magazine.
- Ranked 1st as "Best in Technology" among all banks in the United States by Microbanker Publication.
- Included in NASDAQ’s "1,000 Honor Roll" and "Top 100 Company Honor Roll".
- Ranked 7th and 10th among the "100 Best Banks in the United States" by U.S. Banker Magazine in 2003 and 2002, respectively.
- Ranked among the 20 best publicly held performing companies for the benefit of their stockholders and investors, also known as the "TOP GUN" companies, by the Wall Street Journal (2004). W Holding was the only financial company in such TOP GUNS listing.
- As part of the TOP GUNS listing of The Wall Street Journal, the company was included in the strongest of all categories for having 10 years of consecutive and accumulated benefits of its stockholders (2004).
- Ranked the 1,674th Largest Company in the World by Forbes (2005).

== Stats ==
- Over $16 billion in assets (2006).
- Approx. 1,311 employees.
- Consistently maintained one of the lowest delinquency ratios on its loan portfolios among all banks in Puerto Rico.
- One of the fastest-growing commercial bank in Puerto Rico, increasing both total assets and loans at an average annual growth rate of over 26% for the last five fiscal years.

== Subsidiaries ==
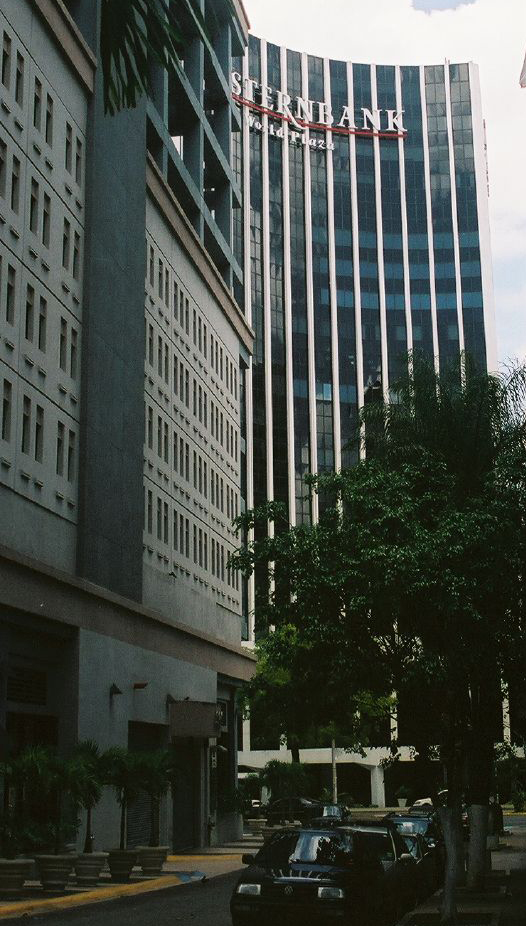
Western Bank Plaza in Golden Mile, Hato Rey, Puerto Rico.

- Westernbank Puerto Rico – main subsidiary. It is the second largest bank in Puerto Rico offering business and consumer financial services, including banking, trust and brokerage services.
- Westernbank International Division – an International Banking Entity under the Puerto Rico International Banking Regulatory Act; provides services to commercial and corporate customers, mainly related to treasury (investment), loans, and securities activities.
- Westernbank Insurance Corp. – a general insurance agent providing property, casualty, life and disability insurance.
- Westernbank Business Credit – Provides commercial business loans secured principally by real estate, accounts receivable, inventory and equipment.
- Westernbank Trust Division – provides trust services for individual, corporate and trust company clients.
- Expresso of Westernbank (Westernbank Express) – manages 19 branches across Puerto Rico and specializes in small, unsecured consumer loans up to $15,000 and real estate collateralized consumer loans up to $150,000.
- Westernbank World Plaza, Inc. – a real estate holding company mainly consisting of the 23 story office building located in Hato Rey, Puerto Rico. A portion of the building's floor space is rented to non-related parties.
- SRG Net, Inc. – an electronic funds transfer network.

== Competitors (in Puerto Rico) ==
- Banco Bilbao Vizcaya Argentaria
- Banco Popular de Puerto Rico
- Banco Santander
- Doral Bank
- FirstBank
- Oriental Financial Group, Inc.
- Scotiabank
