= Assetline =

Assetline Capital
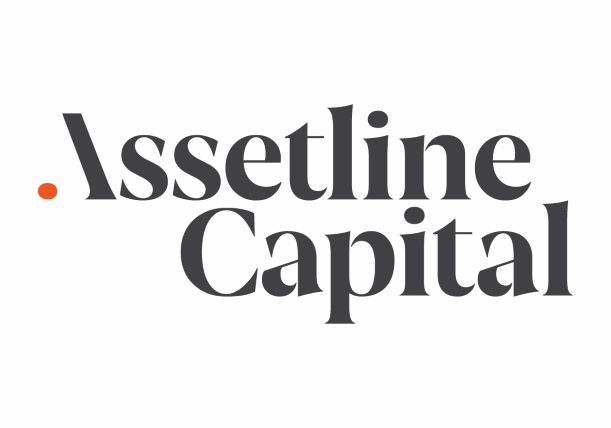
- Type: Private Listed
- Industry: Financial services
- Founded: September 2012
- Founder: Nick Raphaely, Steven Beinart
- Headquarters: Sydney, Australia
- Services: Secured loans, Personal asset loans, Collateral loan,
- Number of employees: 55 (2022)
- Website: www.assetline.com.au

Assetline Capital is an Australian non-bank lender. The company provides secured lending products to property developers, investors and businesses. It has offices in Sydney and Melbourne.

== History ==
Assetline Capital was established in 2012. It operates as a private lender outside the traditional banking sector. The company states that it offers products including bridging finance, construction finance and long-term mortgages.

The company reports that it has managed more than 1,000 transactions with a combined value exceeding $1.2 billion.

== See also ==
- Asset-based lending
- Alternative investment
- Alternative financial services
- Non-bank financial institution
