= Equirex =

Equirex Leasing Corp

Equirex Leasing Corporation
- Type: Private
- Industry: Capital Leasing
- Founded: 1996
- Headquarters: Oakville, Ontario, Canada
- Key people: Larry Mlynowski, President
- Revenue: $11.5M
- Number of employees: 35 (2007)
- Website: www.Equirex.com

Equirex Leasing Corp., is a capital leasing (or asset-based lending) company with its headquarters in Oakville, Ontario, Canada. Founded in 1996, Equirex finances leases in every province in Canada.

The company serves multiple markets including agricultural leases, "B-Finance" capital leases, and industrial equipment leases.

== Capital leasing Industry ==
The Equipment Leasing Association of America estimates that $600 billion worth of equipment was acquired through leasing in 2007. This represents 1/3 of all new equipment acquired by the business. The Canadian leasing industry is proportionately larger, with "over $106.6 billion of financing in place with Canadian businesses and consumers."

Capital Leasing is a subset of the leasing industry and allows companies to get the use of the equipment without having to tie up their capital. Unlike traditional loans where the business is given funds to purchase the asset, capital leases rely on the lessor owning the leased item as collateral during the life of the lease, as well as other covenants. In addition to providing greater legal control over the item, the lessor can also reduce their tax liability through depreciation.

Like the credit reporting industry, the leasing industry segments the market by the relative credit worthiness of the lessee. "A" Finance businesses tend to pay the lowest interest rates and have multiple sources for borrowing. Equipment vendors and banks will fund these lower risk leases, but also receive lower rates of return.

For business that are new, or whose owners have imperfect credit, the B-Finance companies step in. Lessees tend to pay higher interest rates on the leases, and may also supply other collateral. While these businesses pay more, the leasing company must also be more vigilant to reduce the risks or consequences of defaults. As seen in the sub-prime mortgage industry, poorly managed portfolios can lead to significant losses.

== Market Position ==
Equirex is active across Canada, serving all major cities exclusively through a broker network. As a complement to retail and commercial banks who work with lower risk businesses, Equirex has succeeded in the B-Finance segment. In Canada, banks and other lenders have tried to enter this space, but have found it difficult to manage risks and problems in other sub-prime markets have led to retraction from the segment. Equirex emphasizes finding solutions to a business' needs. The company is known for funding leases that are appropriate to the lessee, and mitigate risk.

== Product Mix ==
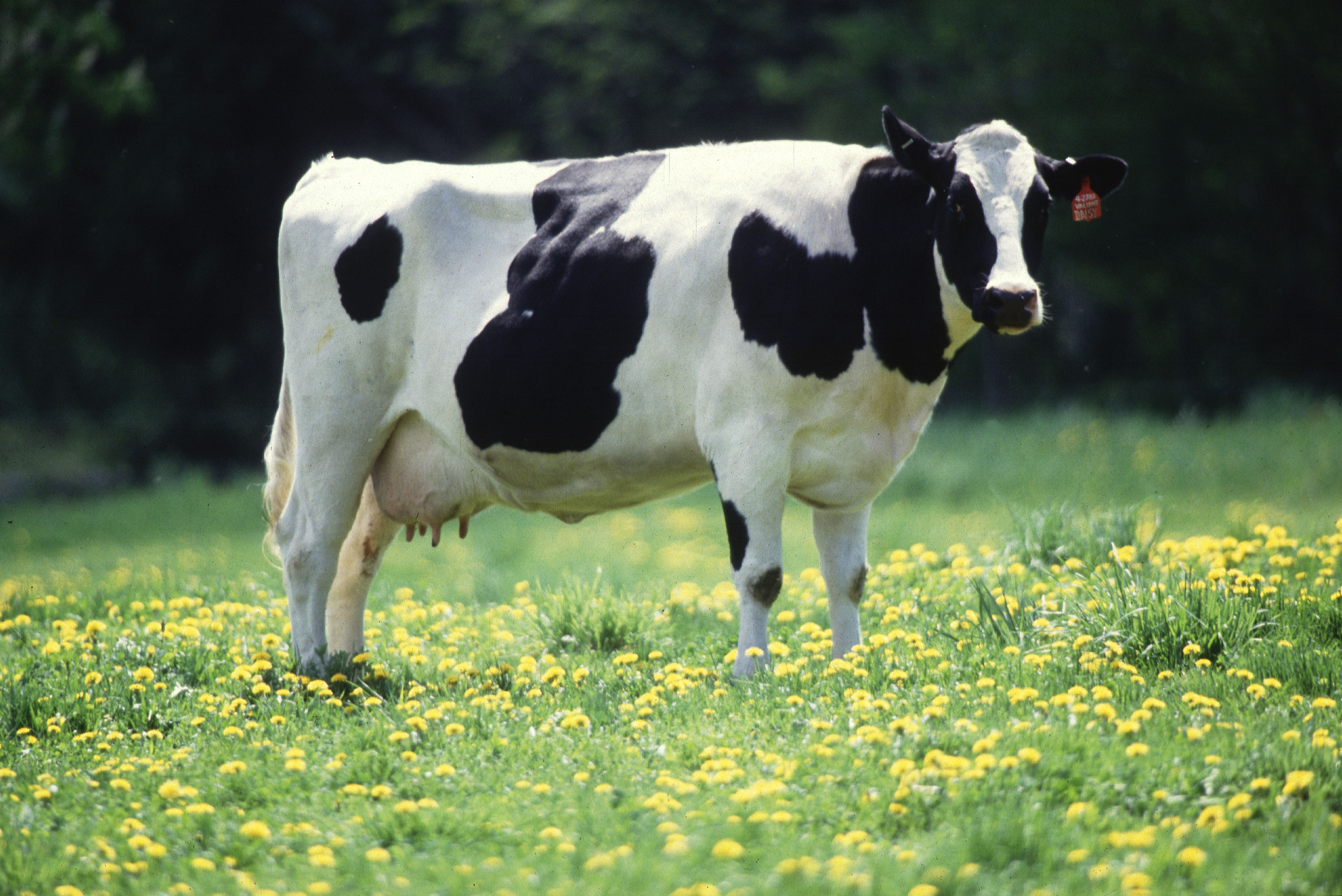
The Agrilease division leases dairy cattle to Canadian farmers

Equirex does not provide consumer leases. Instead, it works with manufacturers and a broker network to supply businesses with needed equipment for their operations. In contrast to most other leasing industry players, Equirex does not use an inside sales force. They work with brokers with expertise by industry segment. Major industries served include:

- Agriculture
- Bars & Restaurants
- Construction
- Forestry
- Health, Fitness and Beauty
- Logistics
- Manufacturing
- Oil & Gas

== See also ==
- Asset-based lending
- Subprime lending
