= Unbolted =

- Type: Privately held company
- Industry: Financial services and Pawnbroker
- Founded: 2014; 12 years ago
- Founders: Ashwin Parmeswaran and Rito Haldar
- Headquarters: London, United Kingdom
- Services: Luxury Asset Loans
- Website: unbolted.com

Unbolted is a UK based online personal asset-based peer-to-peer lending platform and pawnbroker, where individuals can borrow from other individuals by using high value personal assets such as luxury watches, cars, fine arts, antiques, jewellery and commodities such as gold. The company started trading in November 2014 and has its offices in London.

== History ==
Unbolted was set up by Ashwin Parmeswaran and Rito Haldar with an aim to make short-term borrowing transparent, affordable and convenient for consumers and small business owners, by using their high-value personal assets to access low-cost loans. It raised seed funding in July 2014 prior to its public launch in November 2014.

Unbolted offers short-term loans of various types:

- 'Buy now, pay later' loans which allow auction participants at various partner sites (such as Forum Auctions) to bid on items without having the upfront cash.
- Sale advance loans, which allow vendors to receive up to half of their auction reserve before the auction takes place.
- Personal asset bridge loans and working capital loans offered to watch dealers.

Unbolted previously offered 'Gold Trust' loans, which helped to protect lenders from gold price volatility. When issuing these loans, Unbolted used to purchase exchange-traded derivatives (ETF put options) that paid off in the event that gold prices fell. When new FCA regulations came into place in December 2019, Unbolted ended Gold Trust protection for any new gold/precious metal loans.
