= Banco de Ponce =

Former bank in Puerto Rico

Coordinates: 18°0′39.82″N 66°36′47.74″W

- Company type: Private
- Industry: Banking
- Founded: 20 August 1917
- Defunct: 1990 (via merge)
- Fate: Merged with Banco Popular de Puerto Rico
- Headquarters: Ponce, Puerto Rico (1917-1970); San Juan, Puerto Rico (1970-1990)
- Key people: Mario Mercado Montalvo; Amador Torres; Manuel Meiriño; Augusto Quiñones; Francisco Oliver; Antonio Morales; Juan Colón; José de Jesús; Francisco Forteza; Cándido Noriega
- Products: Savings Accounts; Personal loans; Business Loans

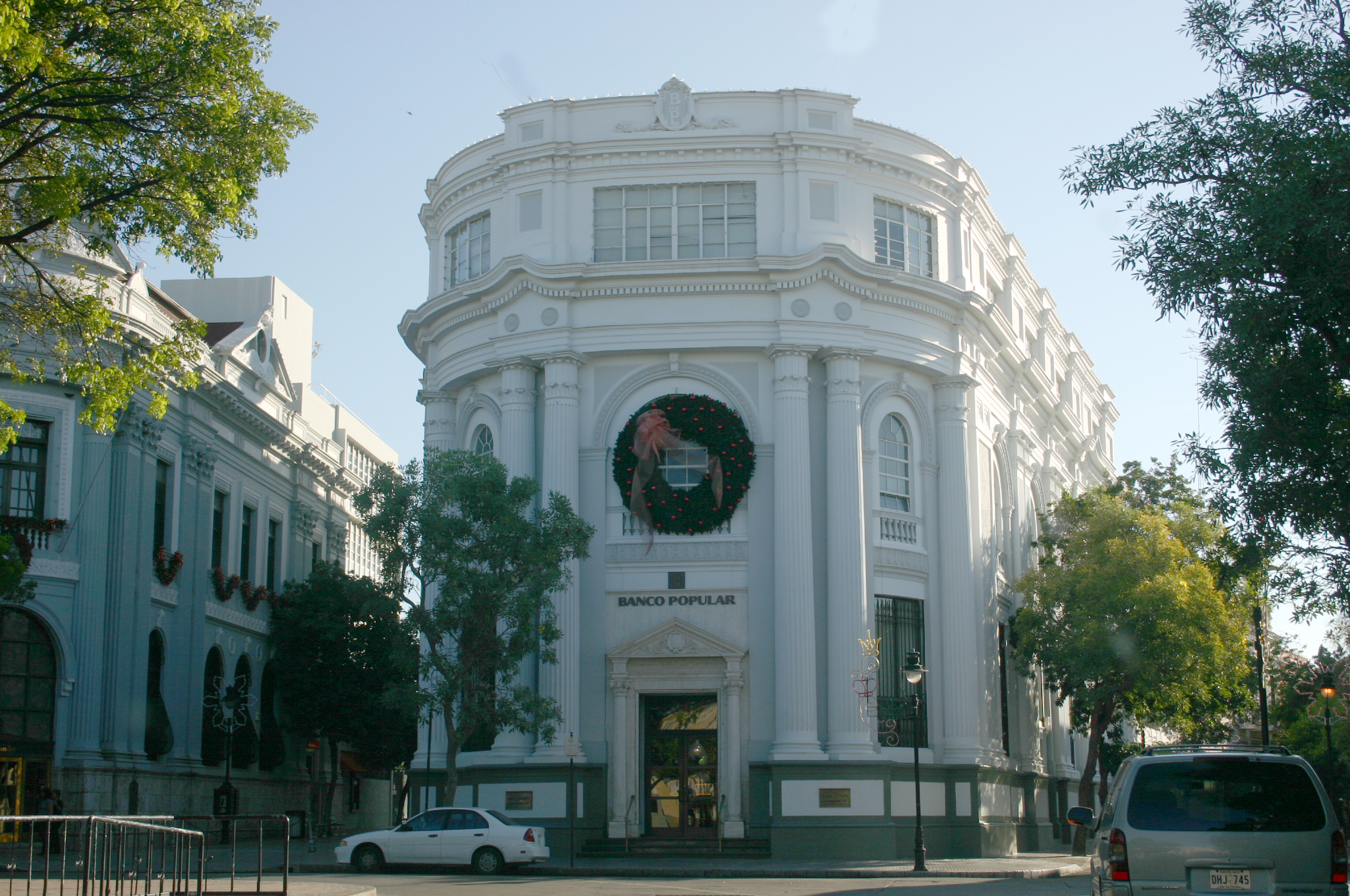
Banco de Ponce's main office, in downtown Ponce (above), was built in 1924, seven years after the bank was founded.

Banco de Ponce was the Puerto Rican bank with the largest number of branches in the United States and second largest bank in deposits and number of branches in Puerto Rico during the twentieth century. Founded in Ponce, Puerto Rico, in the early part of the century, it headquartered in San Juan in 1970 and, 20 years later, merged with Banco Popular forming BancPonce Corporation.

== History ==
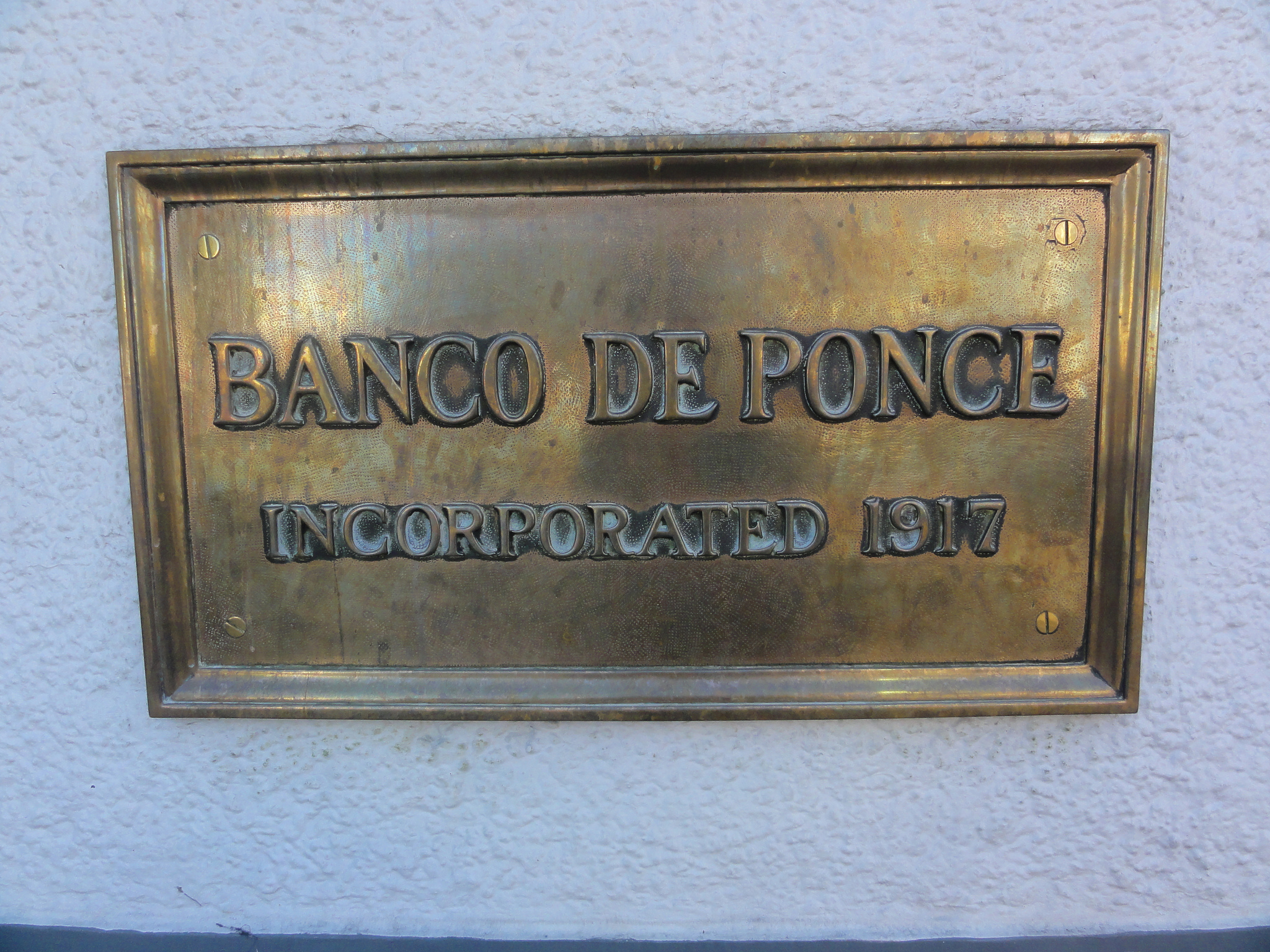
Plaque on the former Banco de Ponce building, now (2012) a branch of Banco Popular

The bank was founded on 20 August 1917, in Ponce, Puerto Rico, by Mario Mercado, Amador Torres, Manuel Meiriño, Augusto Quiñones, Francisco Oliver, Antonio Morales, Juan Colón, José de Jesús, Francisco Forteza and Cándido Noriega. It had a prosperous start and in 1924 it built its main office in downtown Ponce. Architecturally, the downtown structure was so prominent that it would eventually get listed as historic in the National Register of Historic Places.

The Bank continued its growth and by 1961 it already had offices and branches in New York City. By 1989, it had the largest number of branches of any Puerto Rican bank in mainland United States and was the largest Hispanic bank in the United States by deposits.

In 1990, Banco de Ponce merged with Banco Popular creating Puerto Rico's largest bank. Upon the merge, Banco Popular's holding company changed its name to BanPonce Corporation. At the time of the merger, Banco de Ponce had nine branches in New York to Popular's six. With this merge the new company became one of the top ten commercial banks in Latin America and one of the top fifty banks in the United States of America.

== Headquarters ==
In 1970, Banco de Ponce built a prominent landmark building in San Juan Milla de Oro financial district, where it formed its headquarters. The concave curvilinear structure consisted of a 23-story corporate tower, 424,900 square feet of space, and parking for 1,375 vehicles. With the 1990 merger with Banco Popular, the Banco de Ponce Milla de Oro building became part of the new BanPonce Corporation. In early 2002, the Milla de Oro building was sold to WesternBank, Mayaguez, Puerto Rico, who had it renamed "WesternBank World Plaza". With the 30 April 2010 failure of Westernbank, Banco Popular bought Westernbank's assets, but not the former Banco de Ponce Milla de Oro tower. In June 2012, the government of the Commonwealth of Puerto Rico announced it had purchased the Milla de Oro tower to headquarter the Puerto Rico Department of Justice. It is now (2019) called the "World Plaza Building".

== Motto ==
The bank's 1960s-1970s motto was "...El Banco de Puerto Rico" ("...Puerto Rico's Bank") and also "El Banco de Puerto Rico que se da a querer" ("Puerto Rico's Bank that's loved ").

== See also ==
- Banco de Ponce (building)
