= Doral Financial Corporation =

Former Puerto Rican financial holding company

- Type: Public
- Traded as: OTC Pink No Information: DORNQ; OTC Pink No Information: DOROQ; OTC Pink No Information: DORPQ; OTC Pink No Information: DRLCQ
- Industry: Banking
- Founded: San Juan, Puerto Rico; 1972
- Defunct: February 2015
- Headquarters: San Juan, Puerto Rico
- Products: Checking accounts Insurance; Commercial lending Institutional securities Consumer finance Residential mortgage
- Revenue: ▼$545.4 million USD (2010)
- Net income: ▼ –$21.1 million USD (2010)
- Total assets: ▼$10.2 billion USD (2010)
- Number of employees: ▼1,154 (2010)
- Website: Doral Bank Puerto Rico Website Doral Bank New York Website Doral Bank Florida Website

Doral Financial Corporation was the holding company of Doral Bank located in San Juan, Puerto Rico. It was founded in 1972. At the time the bank closed in February 2015, it had $5.9 billion in assets and 26 branches.

== History ==
Doral Financial Corporation was a Puerto Rico based diversified financial services company founded in 1972. In 1999 it established its first branch in New York. Through its wholly owned subsidiaries, Doral Financial offered a variety of banking and insurance agency activities in Puerto Rico and the United States.

Its three main subsidiaries were Doral Mortgage and HF Mortgage, which were two of the largest mortgage companies in Puerto Rico, and Doral Bank whose headquarters was located at 1451 F.D. Roosevelt Avenue, near the Golden Mile District of Hato Rey, San Juan.

In 2008 Doral was transformed to a full-service community bank. It then instituted two community programs, "Ruta Pink" and Sundays at the Museum. In 2009 the bank was recognized by the American Bankers Association Financial Marketing with a top prize. Doral also received a Country Award for Achievement, and was singled out for the 2009 Bank of the Year award by United Kingdom-based ACQ Finance Magazine. In 2010 Doral won several Communitas Awards for providing free homes for families; for providing free access to museums, art workshops and cultural performances; reforesting parks in communities in need; and providing free access to healthcare services, for pro-active community service initiatives, and for high-impact corporate social responsibility. In 2009 the bank also earned the Excel Award from the Public Relations Association for "Domingos dmuseos" in the public relations campaign category. In 2012 the bank was recognized by Communitas and received two award: for TRATA-The Fight Against Child Trafficking; and for Mujeres de Exito (Women of Success.)

On February 27, 2015, Doral Bank, San Juan, PR was closed by the Commissioner of Financial Institutions of Puerto Rico. Subsequently, the Federal Deposit Insurance Corporation (FDIC) was named Receiver. All deposit accounts, including brokered deposits have been transferred to Banco Popular de Puerto Rico & FirstBank. It was the largest bank failure in the United States in 2015 and the 30th largest bank failure in American history.

It then filed for Chapter 11 bankruptcy protection on March 11, 2015.

== Direct competition in Puerto Rico ==
- Banco Popular de Puerto Rico
- Oriental Financial Group, Inc.
- Scotiabank
- Banco Santander
