= Cal National Bank =

American consumer and business bank

California National Bank
- Type: Bank
- Industry: Financial services
- Founded: 1996; 30 years ago in Los Angeles, California
- Founder: FBOP Corporation
- Defunct: October 30, 2009
- Fate: Failed
- Headquarters: Los Angeles, United States
- Products: Mortgages, Banking
- Website: Archived web.archive.org/web/20070510031523/http://www.calnational.com/

California National Bank also known as Cal National Bank, was an American consumer and business bank that operated in Southern California area between 1996 and 2009. The bank was closed by the Office of the Comptroller of the Currency after financial issues caused by the subprime mortgage crisis of 2008.

== Overview ==
Cal National Bank originally began in 1996 when FBOP Corporation acquired Torrance Bank. Two years later, FBOP acquired five branches of Topa Savings and Topa Thrift, establishing California National Bank.

As Cal National started growing, it acquired People’s Bank of California in 2001 and Fidelity Federal Bank in 2002.

When it failed in October 2009, Cal National had 68 branches, mostly in Los Angeles and Orange counties.

== Bank failure ==
On Friday, October 30, 2009, California National Bank was closed by the Office of the Comptroller of the Currency, and the Federal Deposit Insurance Corporation (FDIC) was named Receiver. All deposits and branches were transferred to U.S. Bank.

Because of the subprime mortgage crisis, Cal National suffered massive losses on $855 million worth of securities issued by Fannie Mae and Freddie Mac -- becoming a primary cause of Cal National's failure.

== See also ==
- List of largest U.S. bank failures
