= Ángel Luis Rosas Collazo =

Puerto Rican businessman and academic

Ángel Luis Rosas Collazo (born June 21, 1934 in Mayagüez, Puerto Rico) is a businessman and first commissioner of Puerto Rico Office of the Commissioner of Financial Institutions and first Dean of the UPRM College of Business Administration.

He has a B.A. in accounting from the University of Puerto Rico from 1955 to 1959. He later continued to his Masters in Accounting from the University of Arizona from 1961 to 1962.

From 1964 to 1967 he was the comptroller of José Gonzalez Clemente & Co., the makers of Ron Superior Rum in Mayagüez, Puerto Rico. In 1971 he became the first dean of the newly founded UPRM College of Business Administration. Then he joined public service, becoming the president and CEO of the Housing Bank of Puerto Rico from 1974 to 1976. From 1986 to 1989 he was the first commissioner of Puerto Rico Office of the Commissioner of Financial Institutions.
