= Banco Popular de Puerto Rico =

Bank based in Puerto Rico

Popular, Inc.

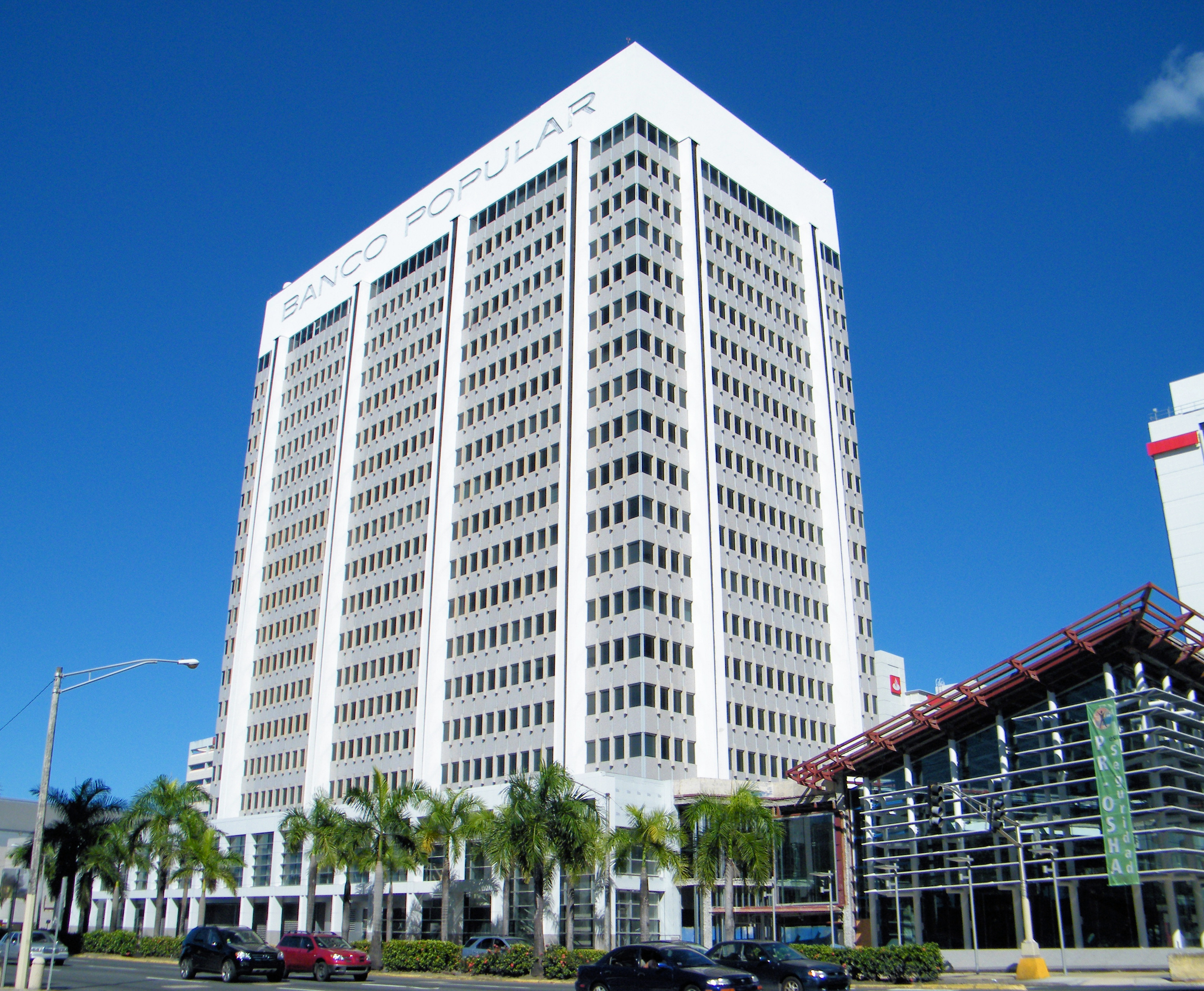
- BPPR’s headquarters in San Juan, 2008
- Trade name: Banco Popular (Puerto Rico and the Virgin Islands); Popular Bank (United States)
- Type: Public
- Traded as: Nasdaq: BPOP; Russell 1000 Component
- Industry: Finance and Insurance
- Founded: October 5, 1893; 132 years ago; San Juan, Puerto Rico
- Headquarters: Hato Rey, San Juan, Puerto Rico
- Area served: United States (Puerto Rico, US Virgin Islands, California, Florida, Illinois, New Jersey, New York)
- Key people: Jorge J. García, President and Chief Executive Officer (since September 1, 2026); José R. Coleman Tio, Executive Vice President, Chief Legal Officer and Corporate Secretary; Richard Carrión, Chairman of the Board of Directors
- Products: Banking; Checking accounts; Insurance; Stock brokerage; Investment bank; Asset-based lending; Consumer finance
- Net income: ▲US$541.3 million (2023)
- Total assets: ▲US$ $70.9 billion as of March 31, 2024; ▲US$ 65,926,000,000 (2021)
- Number of employees: 9,132 (2023)
- Website: popularbank.com

Popular, Inc., doing business as Banco Popular de Puerto Rico (BPPR) or simply as Banco Popular in Puerto Rico and the British and U.S. Virgin Islands, and as Popular Bank in the United States, is a full-service financial services conglomerate headquartered at Popular Center in the Milla de Oro financial district in the Hato Rey business center of San Juan, the capital city and municipality of the archipelago and island of Puerto Rico. Founded in 1893, it is the largest banking institution in Puerto Rico in terms of assets and deposits, and it ranks among the largest bank and thrift holding companies in total assets in the United States. In recent years, it has expanded into other areas of the Caribbean and Latin America.

== History ==
The bank was founded in Puerto Rico in 1893 when the island was still under Spanish administration. It was led in its early stages by Rafael Carrión Sr. and Don Manuel Muñoz Barrios, the latter of which was the company's first president and administrator.

During the 1970s, the company's commercials were popular on Puerto Rican television: they presented a balding, middle aged man in a white tee shirt, announcing the company in a comic way. The 1970s also saw a giant step in the development of Banco Popular as Puerto Rico's biggest bank, when it bought two-thirds of the Banco de Crédito y Ahorro Ponceño. Through this purchase, Popular entered the credit-card industry.

During the following decades, Banco Popular put great of emphasis on the company's public image. It was during the 1980s, after Rafael Carrion, Sr.'s death, that Richard L. Carrión assumed the role as President of the corporation.

In 1989, the bank introduced a children's savings service with a bear, "Populoso", as its mascot. The Club del Ahorro (or Savings Club) was (and still is) intended to encourage children to open savings accounts and keep track of their money.

=== 1990s ===
The following decade started with a big development for the bank, when in 1990 it merged with Banco de Ponce, one of the largest banks in Puerto Rico. At this time, Banco Popular's holding company changed its name to BanPonce Corporation. Popular acquired Banco Roig, one of the main banks in the eastern side of the island, in 1997, entering a geographical market in which it had yet to succeed.

During the late 1990s, the company began to diversify its services thanks to revisions of state laws that allowed banks certain 'privileges' related to different financial services other than banking. These years saw the birth of Popular Auto, Popular Finance, Popular Mortgage, Popular Insurance, Popular Leasing, among others.

During this time, the company created one of its flagship subsidiaries, Popular Securities. It quickly became the investment banking, retail brokerage, and institutional sales arm of Banco Popular. On the retail side, Popular Securities has an extensive network of brokers in Puerto Rico, rivaled only by Swiss giant UBS and more recently by Banco Santander. Popular Securities has additional offices in New York City, San Antonio, Houston, and Chicago.

=== 2000s ===
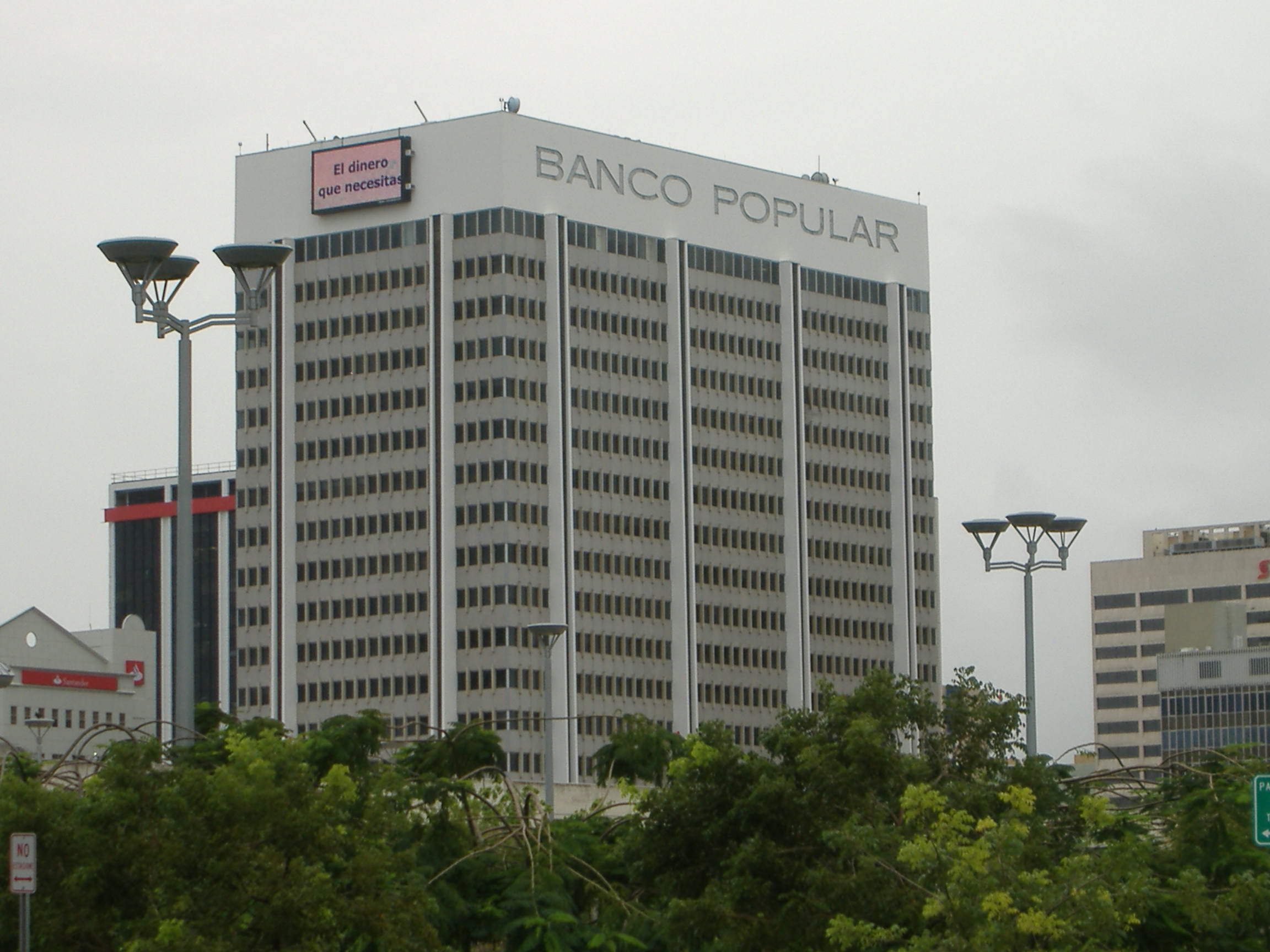
Popular, Inc. headquarters in San Juan, seen from the José Miguel Agrelot Coliseum.

Due to its growth in Puerto Rico, and the aggressive expansion in the United States, the company changed its name once again in 2000 to Popular, Inc., a name that goes back to the traditional roots of the corporation and which also reflects the common title in almost all of the subsidiaries of the company.

During this period, the company reorganized itself into three main subsidiary companies: Banco Popular de Puerto Rico, with David Chafey Jr. as president; Popular Bank, with Roberto Herencia as president; and Evertec, with Felix Villamil as president. Richard Carrión remained as president and CEO of the parent company, Popular, Inc.

In the January 24, 2005 issue of Fortune, Popular, Inc. was chosen as one of the 100 Best Companies to Work For.

On April 11, 2005, Popular Bank announced a five-year agreement with the New York Mets under which Popular would operate seven ATMs and display various advertisements at Shea Stadium until it closed in September 2008, and the team moved to the new Citi Field.

=== Present ===
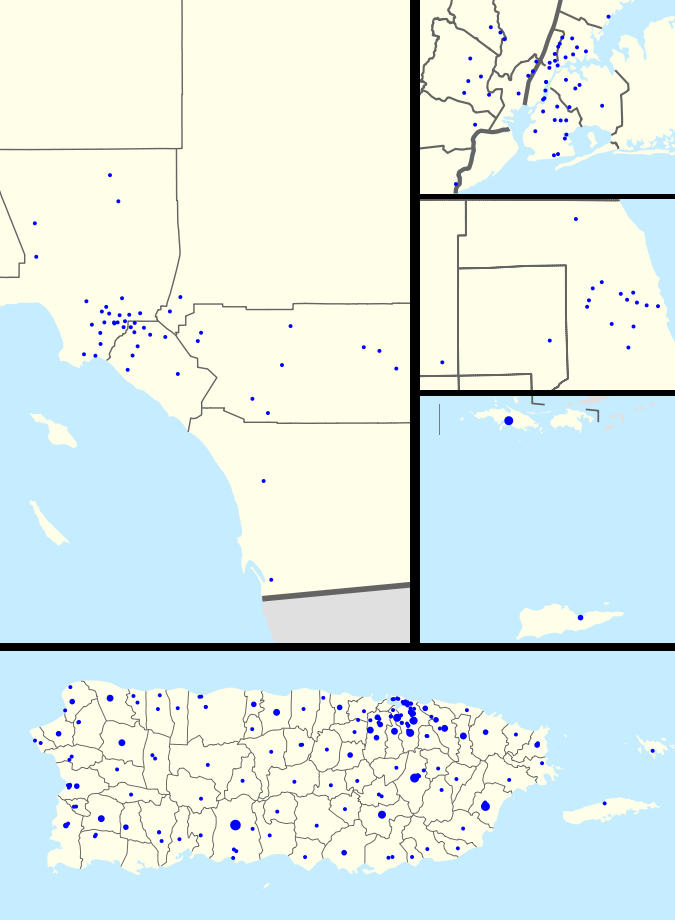
Footprint of Popular, Inc. branches. On the bottom, Puerto Rico; on the upper left, Greater Los Angeles; on the right, from top to bottom: Greater New York City (including New Jersey), the Chicago metropolitan area, and the US Virgin Islands. Not to scale.

Popular's world headquarters are located in the San Juan's Hato Rey business district, on a stretch of a thoroughfare commonly known as Milla de Oro ("The Golden Mile") due to the number of banks headquartered in the area. Travelers who fly into the Luis Muñoz Marín International Airport can appreciate Popular's landmark building below.

Between 2010 and 2012, the bank re-branded its mainland branches as Popular Community Bank in an effort to attract more non-Hispanic customers. The first branches to bear the new name were in the Chicago market followed by those in Southern California and Florida, then New York City and New Jersey.

As of January, 2012, Popular, Inc. still owed $935 million to the US government Troubled Asset Relief Program.

In March 2013, Popular announced it would sell a $568 million portfolio of non-performing loans to a joint venture between Caribbean Property Group and funds affiliated with Perella Weinberg Partners.

In 2014, Popular Community Bank sold many of its mainland United States branches in Central Florida, Illinois and Southern California to cut costs and shore up its reserves against losses caused by foreclosures and the recession in Puerto Rico. After the sale, Popular Community Bank retained 49 branches in South Florida, New Jersey, and New York. On September 12, 2014, Harbor Community Bank purchased Popular's branches in Orlando and central Florida. On November 7, 2014, Banc of California in Irvine purchased 20 branches of Popular Community Bank in southern California.

In 2018, Popular Community Bank changed its name to Popular Bank (Legal name) and Popular, commercial name.

== Stats ==
Banco Popular was ranked the Best Consumer Internet Bank in Puerto Rico by Global Finance in 2007.

== Timeline (2005–present) ==
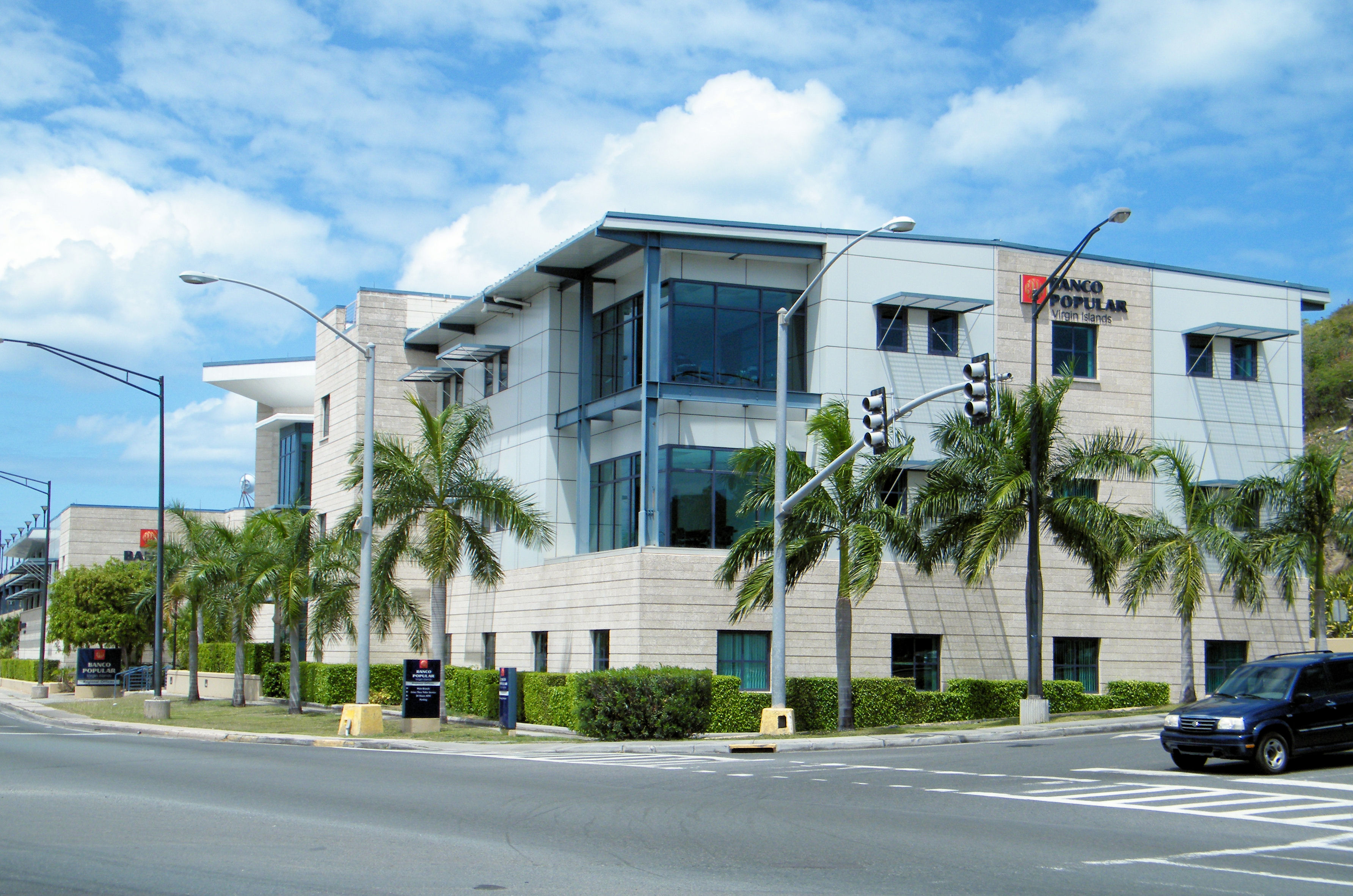
The Banco Popular Virgin Islands regional office in Charlotte Amalie.

- 2005: Popular completes acquisition of Quaker City Bank, establishing California as the largest region of Popular Bank. Popular also purchases New Jersey's Infinity Mortgage for an undisclosed amount. On August 3, 2005, Popular announced the purchase of E-Loan for an estimated $300 million merger agreement. A month later, on September 21, Popular announced that it would sell Popular Cash Express to ACE Cash Express for $36 million. Popular was ranked as the 691st largest company in the world by Forbes.
- 2007: Banco Popular North America sells five of six branches in Texas region to Prosperity Bank.
- 2007: Banco Popular acquires Citibank's retail business in Puerto Rico, including nine branches, as well as the operations in Puerto Rico of broker-dealer Smith Barney, a Citibank subsidiary.
- 2008: Popular agrees to sell certain assets of Equity One, the U.S. mainland consumer finance operations of Popular Financial Holdings, to American General Finance, a member of American International Group.
- 2010: Banco Popular acquires competitor Westernbank, after it failed and the Federal Deposit Insurance Corporation seized its deposits. On October 1, 2010, Popular sold 51% Evertec participating to Apollo Management.
- 2015: Banco Popular acquires the deposits of Doral Bank after regulators declared it insolvent.
- 2018: Popular Community Bank changed its name to Popular Bank (Legal name) and Popular, commercial name.
- 2026: Jorge J. García becomes President and Chief Executive Officer of Popular, Inc., succeeding Javier D. Ferrer, who retired effective August 31, 2026.

== Subsidiaries and services ==
=== Puerto Rico ===
- Banco Popular de Puerto Rico
- Popular Auto
- Popular Securities
- Popular Asset Management
- Popular Insurance
- Popular Mortgage
- Popular Risk Services

=== United States ===
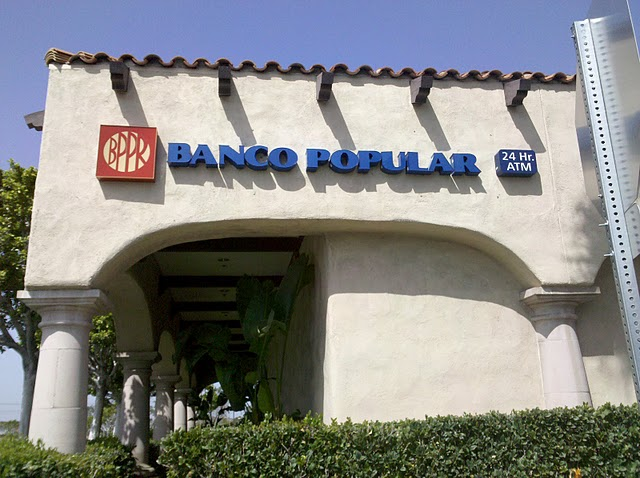
A location in Anaheim Hills. This branch has since been sold to Banc of California.

- Popular Bank
- Popular Business Banking
- Popular Association Banking
- Popular Equipment Finance
- Popular Direct
- Popular Private Client

=== Virgin Islands ===
- Banco Popular Virgin Islands

=== Former subsidiaries ===
- Popular Cash Express (sold to ACE Cash Express on 09/21/2005)

== Musical tradition ==
For its 100th Anniversary celebration, Popular gathered a group of Latin-American musicians in an effort to create a musical televised show. After the large success of this venture, the company began to produce annual live Christmas concerts and television specials with various Puerto Rican and international singers and artists. The concerts and specials are aired on local television stations and then released on CDs and DVD.

== Competitors (in Puerto Rico) ==
- OFG Bancorp
- First BanCorp
