= FBOP Corporation =

Illinois-based financial services company

- Company type: Private
- Industry: Finance and Insurance
- Defunct: October 30, 2009; 16 years ago
- Fate: FBOP's banking subsidiaries were closed by their chartering agencies, and the agencies appointed the FDIC as receiver.
- Headquarters: Oak Park, Illinois, United States
- Number of locations: 108 banking centers
- Area served: Arizona, California, Illinois, and Texas
- Services: Commercial and retail banking
- Net income: $917 million
- Total assets: $18.5 billion
- Number of employees: 4064
- Subsidiaries: Bank USA, Cal National Bank, Citizens National Bank, Madisonville State Bank, North Houston Bank, Pacific National Bank, San Diego National Bank
- Website: Archive of official website

FBOP Corporation was a financial services company based in Oak Park, Illinois, United States. As of mid-2009, it had $18.5 billion in assets and was the 46th largest bank holding company in the United States. On October 30, 2009, FBOP's banking subsidiaries were closed by their chartering agencies and the Federal Deposit Insurance Corporation was appointed as their receiver. The company had over 4064 employees.

The holding company began as First Bank of Oak Park. FBOP started acquiring other banks in 1990. In 2006, First Bank of Oak Park merged with four other co-owned banks in Illinois to create Park National Bank. FBOP operated banks in Illinois, California, Texas, and Arizona, prior to their closure.

U.S. Bancorp acquired all nine of FBOP's nine banks on the day of closure, but later sold the three Texas-based banks to Prosperity Bancshares.

== Key people ==
- Chairman: Michael E. Kelly
- President: Robert M. Heskett
- SVP and CFO: Michael Dunning

== Former subsidiaries ==
Name	Market	Asset size
Cal National Bank	Los Angeles	$5.6 billion
Park National Bank	Chicago	3.8 billion
San Diego National Bank	San Diego, California	2.4 billion
Pacific National Bank	San Francisco, California	1.3 billion
North Houston Bank	Houston, Texas	326 million
Madisonville State Bank	Madisonville, Texas	183 million
Bank USA	Phoenix, Arizona	138 million
Community Bank of Lemont	Lemont, Illinois	96 million
Citizens National Bank	Teague, Texas	64 million

== Acquisition history ==
Date	Acquisition	Asset Size ($ millions)
05/31/90	Regency Savings Bank, FSB	$325
01/29/91	Citizens National Bank of Chicago	$20
05/17/91	Cosmopolitan Bank and Trust	$110
11/06/92	Republic Federal Savings Bank	$250
02/28/93	Madisonville State Bank	$100
03/18/94	Irving Federal Savings Bank	$72
01/01/95	Citizens National Bank	$25
03/31/95	North Houston Bank	$72
06/30/95	International Savings Bank	$250
04/12/96	San Diego Branches of California Federal Bank, FSB	$386
07/01/96	Torrance Bank, SSB	$107
11/01/96	TOPA Savings Bank and TOPA Thrift and Loan	$525
01/24/97	Dean Witter Trust, FSB	$13
02/28/97	San Diego National Bank	$229
01/07/99	Pullman Bank and Trust Company	$525
04/30/99	Calumet Federal Savings and Loan Association of Chicago	$495
07/19/99	Sterling Savings Bank	$9
09/12/99	Chicago City Bank and Trust Company	$176
02/18/00	Los Padres Savings Bank	$65
04/30/01	Peoples Bank of California	$3,228
12/31/01	Fidelity Federal Bank	$2,315
09/20/02	Sterling Bank	$12
09/30/02	BankUSA	$116
01/13/03	Park National Bank and Trust of Chicago	$246
11/07/03	Continental Community Bank	$12
07/01/04	California Savings Bank	$864
01/02/07	United Community Bank of Lisle	$273
10/01/07	Cardunal Savings Bank, FSB	$180

== Bank failure ==
FBOP's subsidiaries lost an estimated $800 million when the United States Treasury placed government-sponsored mortgage investors Fannie Mae (FNM, Fortune 500) and Freddie Mac (FRE, Fortune 500) into conservatorship and wiped out preferred stockholders. As a result, FBOP posted an operating loss of $708 million for 2008. By the end of June, FBOP's resources had dwindled so low that the firm ranked below 98% of similar bank holding companies in terms of tier 1 leverage ratio, a measure of bank capital.

In August 2009, FBOP signed a so-called written agreement with the Federal Reserve that gave it a schedule to raise capital, improve risk management and reduce its concentration of commercial real estate loans. The bank was to submit a capital plan within 30 days.

FBOP failed to raise enough capital to satisfy the terms of the agreement. On October 30, 2009, FBOP's subsidiaries were closed by their chartering agencies and the Federal Deposit Insurance Corporation was appointed as their receiver. The FDIC entered into a purchase and assumption agreement with Minnesota-based U.S. Bancorp to assume the assets and deposit liabilities of the closed banks. The FDIC estimates its losses on the combined transaction at $2.5 billion.
