= Milla de Oro =

Stretch of Juan Ponce de León Ave. in Hato Rey, Puerto Rico

- Financial district of San Juan, Puerto Rico
- Hato Rey
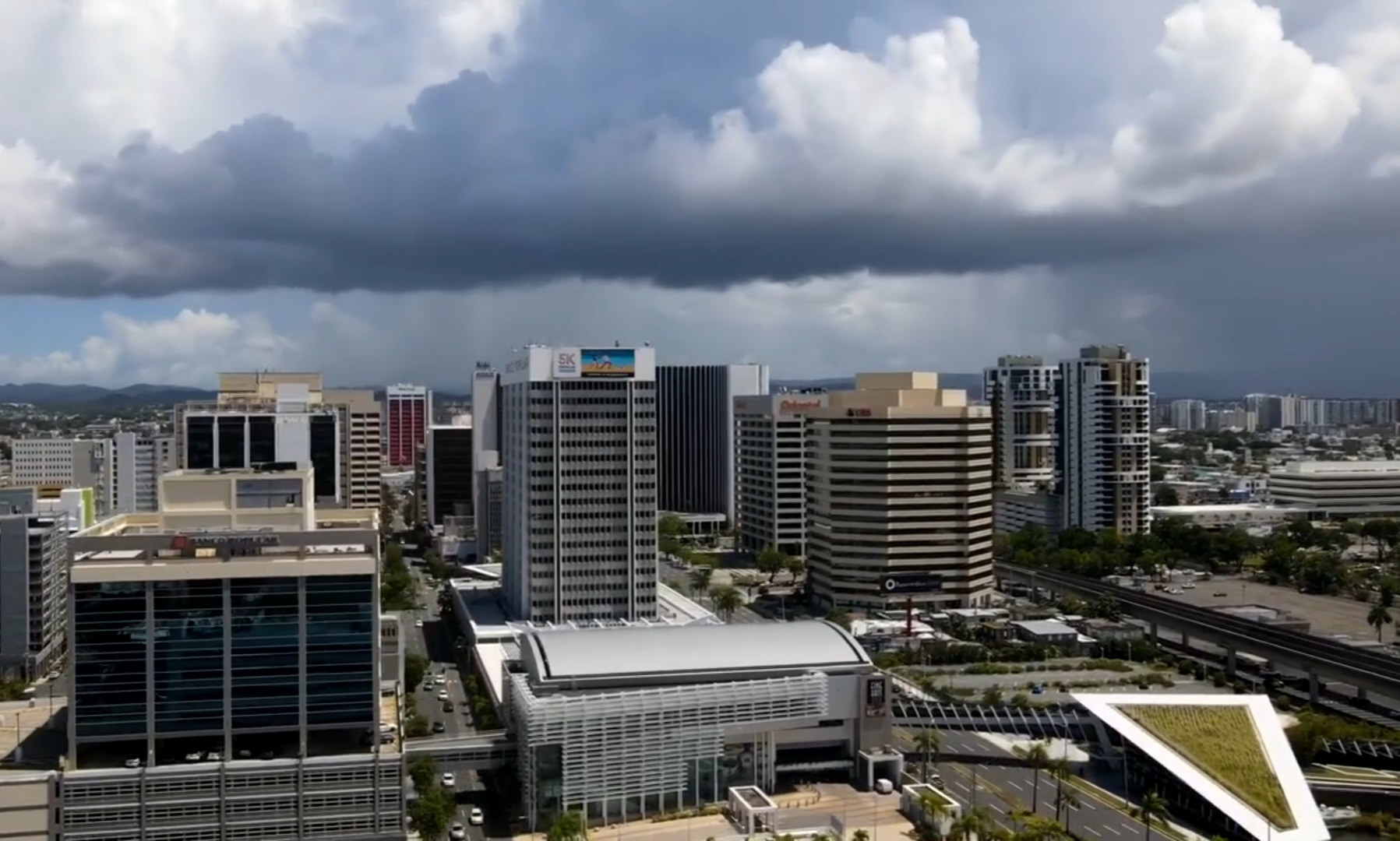
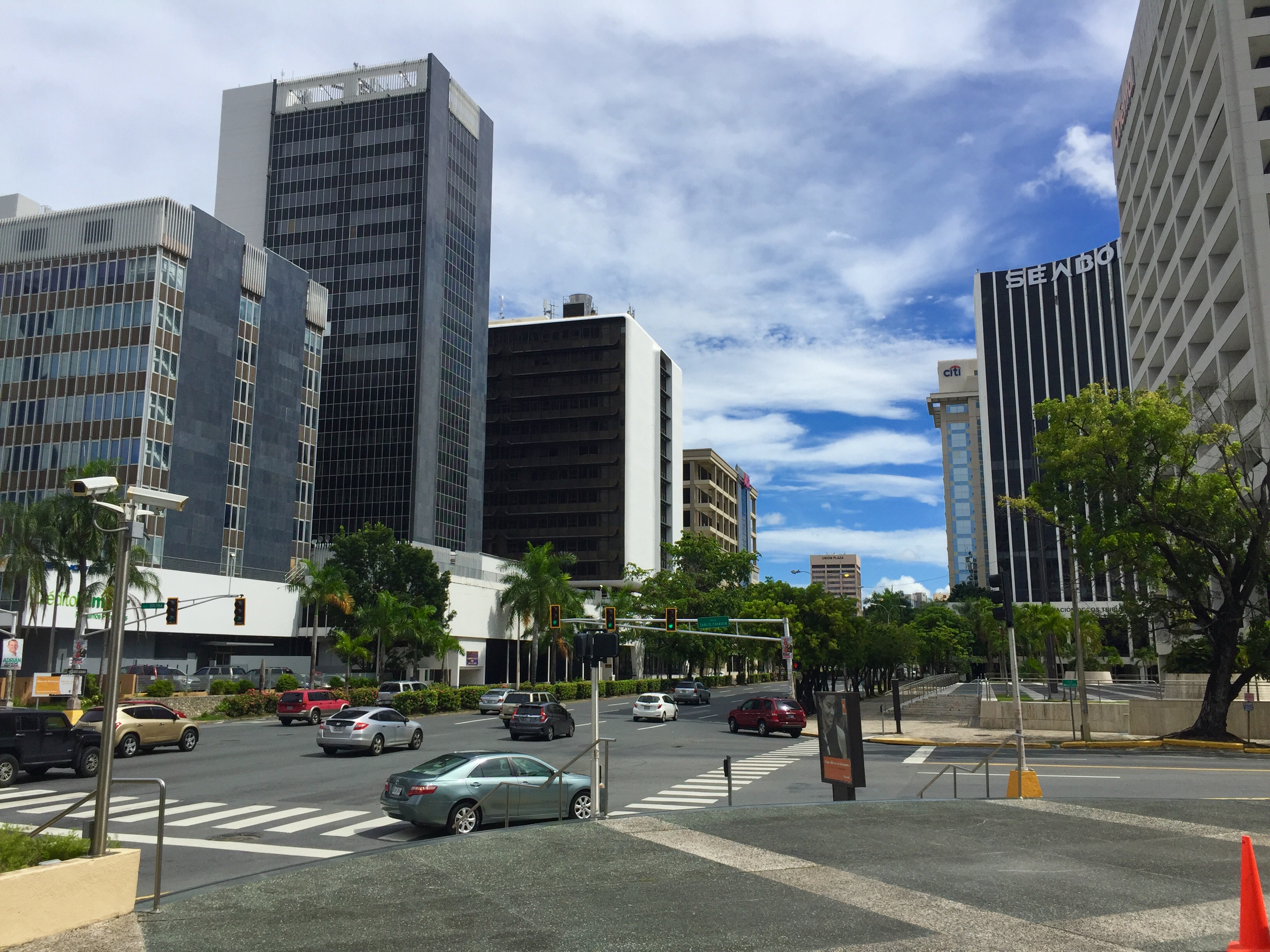
- Milla de Oro skyline (top) and Luis Muñoz Rivera Avenue at Milla de Oro (bottom), 2016
- Interactive map of Milla de Oro
- Coordinates: 18°25′40.5″N 66°03′33.0″W
- Commonwealth: Puerto Rico
- Municipality: San Juan

Milla de Oro (English for Golden Mile) is the main financial district of Puerto Rico, containing the largest agglomeration of corporate investment, banking, and financial institutions in the Caribbean. Located in the Hato Rey business center of San Juan, the capital municipality of the archipelago and island, it is concentrated in the sections of Juan Ponce de León Avenue and Luis Muñoz Rivera Avenue that cross Hato Rey from north to south. The area is served by the Tren Urbano stations of Hato Rey, Roosevelt, Domenech, and Piñero, as well as numerous bus routes with connections to the nearby Río Piedras district, Condado and Isla Verde resort areas, and Old San Juan historic quarter.

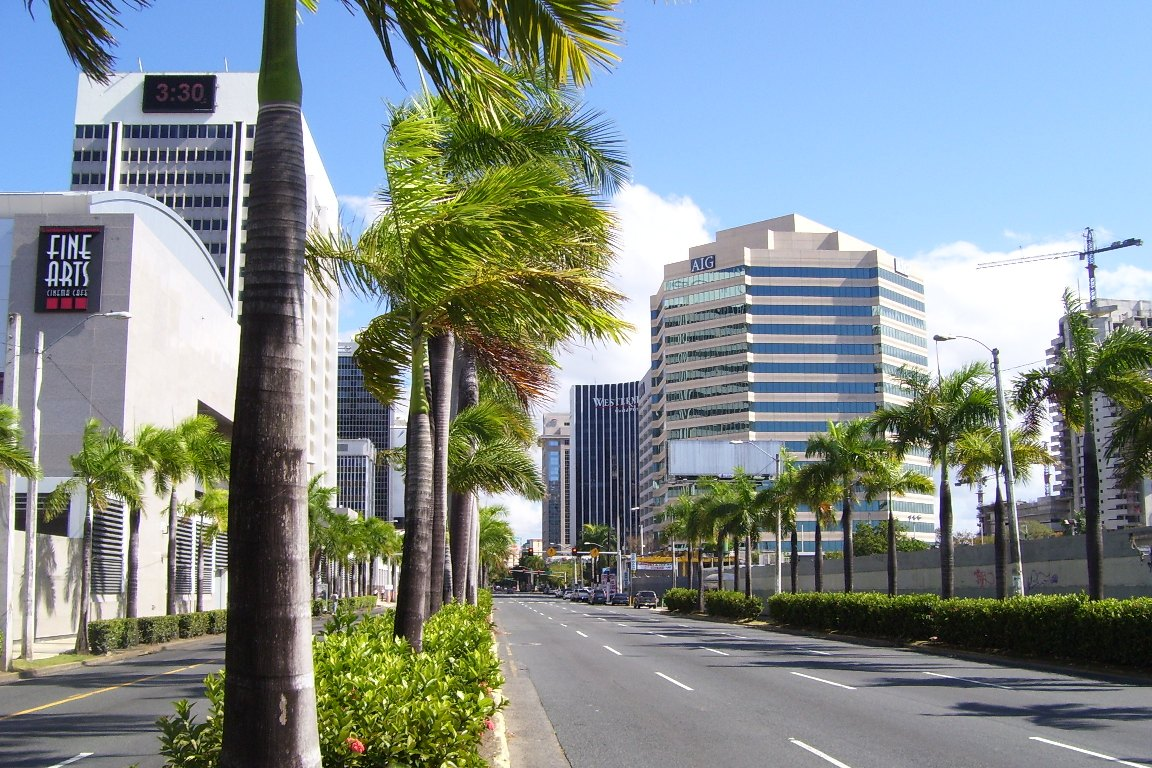
Luis Muñoz Rivera Ave. at Milla de Oro. Buildings visible, from left to right: 1. Fine Arts Cinema Cafe; 2. Popular, Inc.; 3. Citigroup; 4. Westernbank World Plaza; 5. American International Group

== List of buildings at La Milla de Oro ==
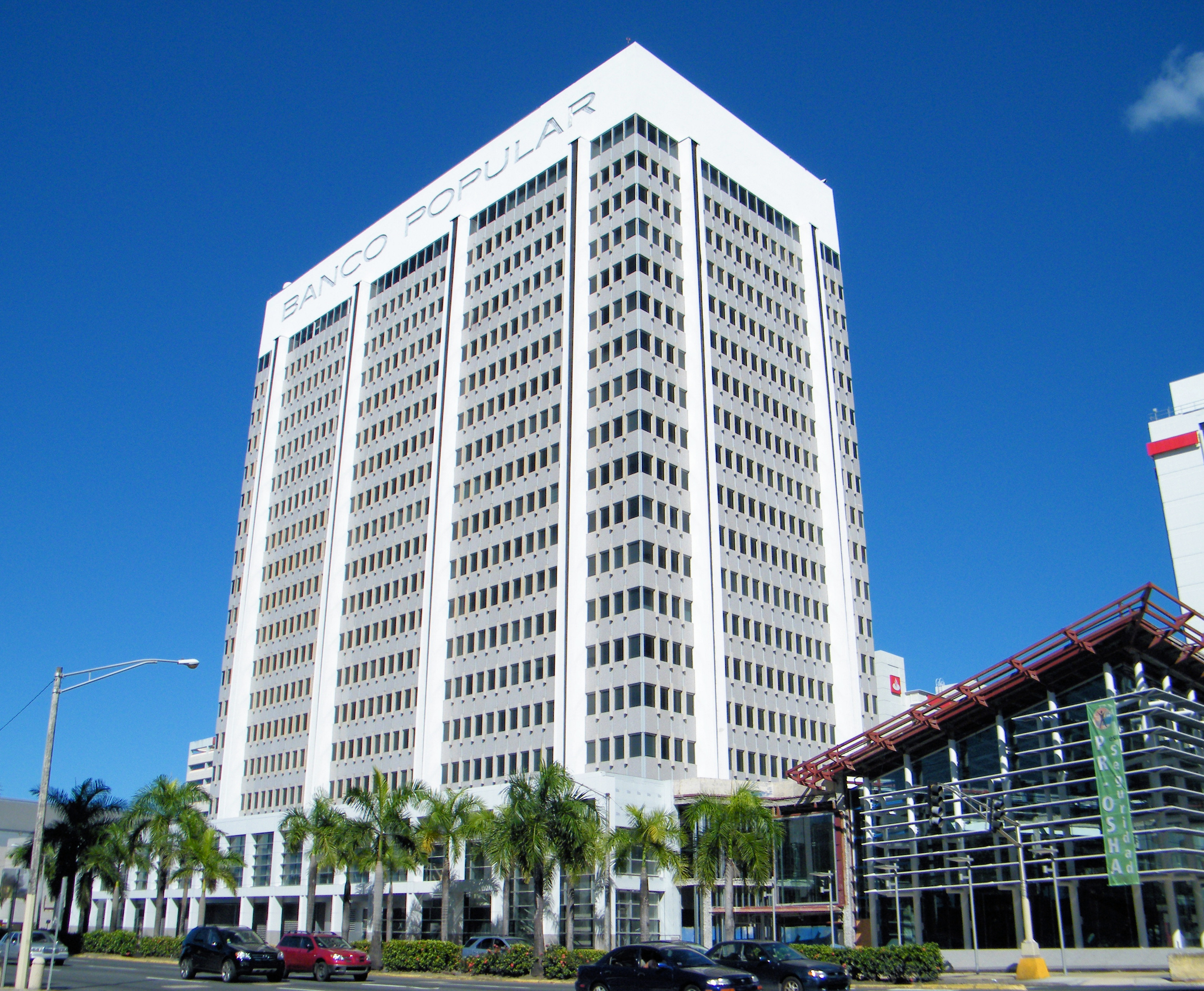
Popular, Inc. headquarters main building at the Golden Mile.

- Popular, Inc. headquarters (3 buildings)
- AFI Plaza (Seaborne Airlines Plaza) (formerly Westernbank World Plaza, the Banco de Ponce headquarters); acquired by Banco Popular de Puerto Rico after an FDIC closure of several banks on the Island in 2010.
- Kevane Grant Thornton Building (formerly known as Bolivia 33)
- The Hato Rey Center (formerly known as Home Mortgage Plaza)
- Banco Santander building
- Plaza 273 (formerly known as Plaza Scotiabank)
- Plaza 221 (formerly known as Banco Economias, Banco Central Hispano and then Banco Santander)
- American International Group (AIG) building
- MCS Plaza (Formerly Pan-Am Plaza)
- Puerto Rico Comptroller’s Office building
- City of San Juan government tower
- AON Center
- City Towers (formerly known as Citibank Tower)
- Centrum Plaza
- Puerto Rico Department of Labor and Human Resources (Departamento del Trabajo y Recursos Humanos) building
- José Miguel Agrelot Coliseum (Coliseo de Puerto Rico)
- OFG Bancorp Center (formerly Chase Manhattan Bank Plaza and BBVA Plaza)
- Tren Urbano Hato Rey station
- Tren Urbano Roosevelt station
- Aquablue at the Golden Mile
- Quantum Metrocenter, designed by SCF Arquitectos and built in 2012
- Uruguay 269 (under construction)
- Coliseum Tower (completed)
- Metropolis (under construction)
- Infinity (under Construction)
- Torre Mayor
- Instituto Socio Economico Comunitario (www.insec.org)
- Fine Arts Cafe (an upscale Repertory Theatre owned by Caribbean Cinemas)
- Fi Sigma Alfa Fraternity Club House (Restaurant and activities hall)

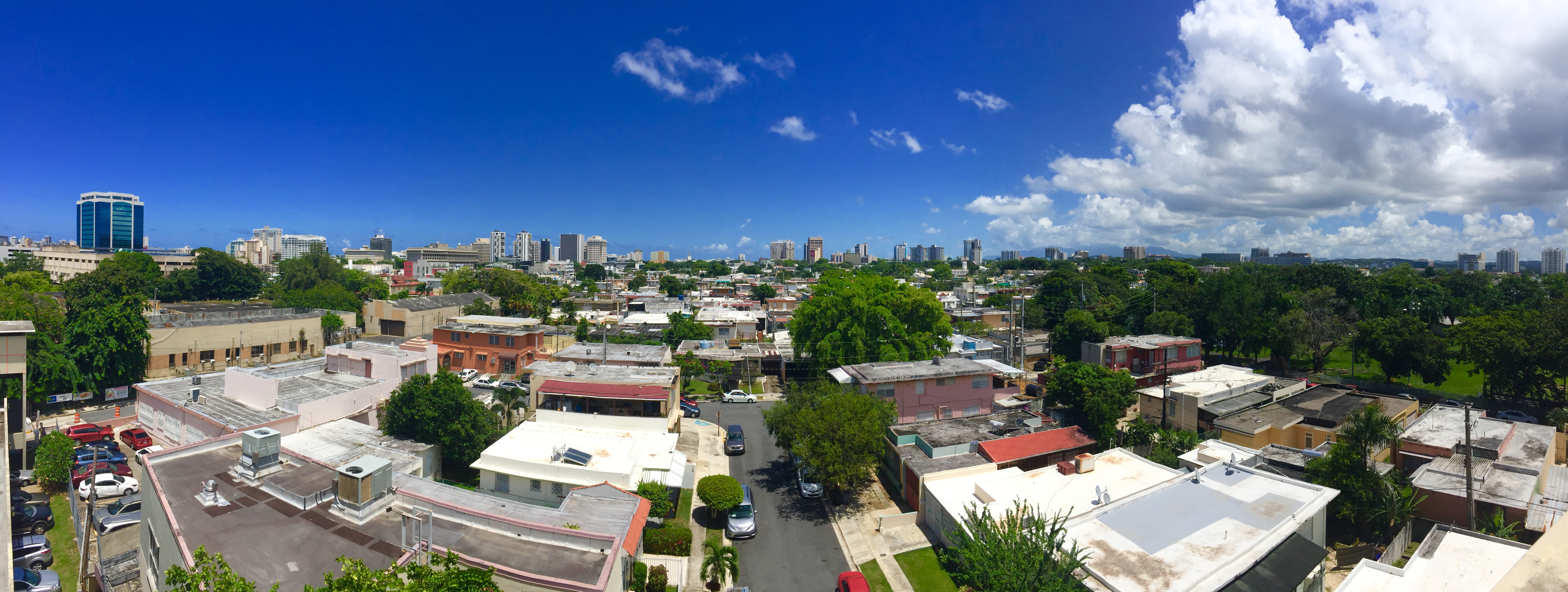
Panorama in the vicinity of Roosevelt Avenue and Expreso Las Americas looking towards the Golden Mile.

== Plans ==
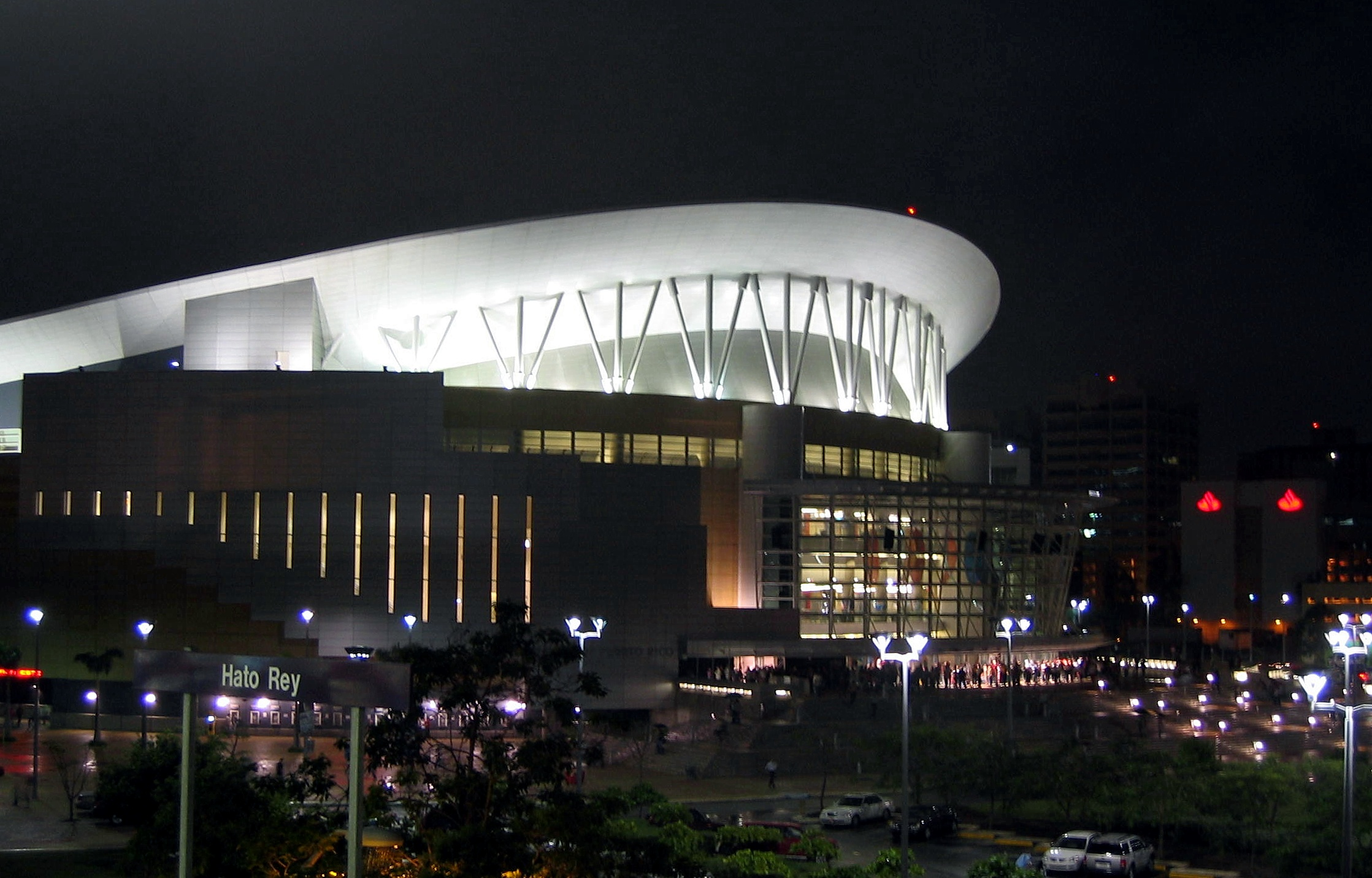
Night view of the José Miguel Agrelot Coliseum. Photo taken from the nearby Tren Urbano Station in Milla de Oro.

Milla de Oro has received criticism from nearby communities for its lonely and dark environment after work hours. In order to foster tourism and economic growth in the area, the government has planned to convert the district into a more community friendly sector by attracting tourists, visitors, and local residents to the district during after hours through concerts, retail shops, and nightspots.

The first phase of this conversion was to locate the José Miguel Agrelot Coliseum and several Tren Urbano metro system stations in the district. Banco Popular recently inaugurated a new project near its headquarters called Arts Cinemas at Popular Center for exhibiting foreign and independent films and a deli-café. New residential apartments and a 31-story high commercial complex near the Coliseum are being developed in the area as well.

== Milla de Oro in popular culture ==
The Milla de Oro was heavily featured in the Calle 13 2010 musical video for "Calma Pueblo". The song features lead singer, Residente, singing on top of a building while businessmen and random people run around the Milla de Oro, eventually getting naked.

The Milla de Oro was also featured in the film Fast Five during one of the heists.
