= First BanCorp =

Bank based in Puerto Rico

First Bancorp
- Type: Public
- Traded as: NYSE: FBP; S&P 600 component
- Industry: Banking; Financial services
- Founded: 1948; 78 years ago
- Headquarters: San Juan, Puerto Rico
- Key people: Aurelio Aleman (President and CEO)
- Products: Checking accounts Insurance and mortgage Investment banking & services Consumer finance + ABL
- Revenue: ▲1.201 billion US$ (2008)
- Net income: ▲75.838 million US$ (Q2 2024)
- Number of employees: 3,000 (2009)
- Website: www.1firstbank.com

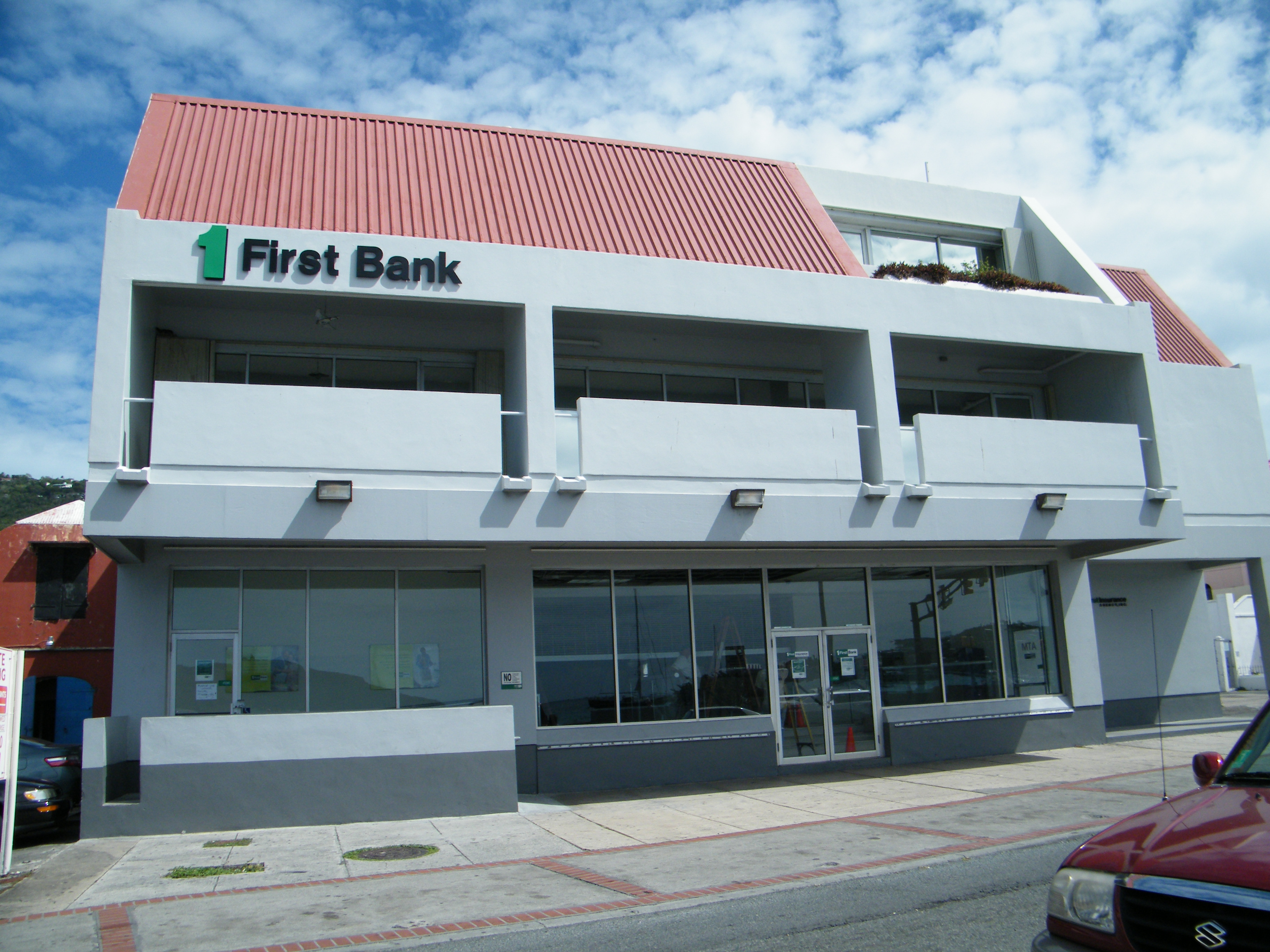
First Bank branch in Charlotte Amalie, U.S. Virgin Islands

First BanCorp is a publicly traded financial holding company located in San Juan, Puerto Rico.

== History ==
FirstBank was the first Savings & Loan institution established in Puerto Rico with a capital of $200,000 in 1948. Today, the company provides financial services for retail, commercial and institutional clients in Puerto Rico, US Virgin Islands, British Virgin Islands and Florida. First BanCorp is headquartered in San Juan, Puerto Rico and is ranked the 669th and 1537th Largest Company In The World in Forbes magazine by Total Assets and Profits. On 2006 it had over $18.8 billion in assets.

As of May, 2016, First owed $124.97 million to the US government Troubled Asset Relief Program.

In October 2019, FirstBank announced their intention to purchase Banco Santander de Puerto Rico. The transaction was approved by regulators on July 28, 2020 and should be completed by September 1, 2020.

== Key leadership ==
- Mr. Aurelio Aleman-Bermudez

Chief Exec. Officer, Pres, Director,

- Mr. Orlando Berges-Gonzalez CPA

Chief Financial Officer and Exec. VP

== Direct competition in Puerto Rico ==
- Banco Popular de Puerto Rico (BPOP) & OFG Bancorp (OFG)
