= Puerto Rico Office of the Commissioner of Financial Institutions =

Office of the Department of Treasury of Puerto Rico

Office of the Commissioner of Financial Institutions of Puerto Rico
- Oficina del Comisionado de Instituciones Financieras

Agency overview
- Formed: October 11, 1985
- Jurisdiction: Puerto Rico
- Headquarters: San Juan, Puerto Rico
- Agency executive: Víctor Rodríguez Bonilla, Commissioner
- Website: www.ofic.pr.gov

The Office of the Commissioner of Financial Institutions of Puerto Rico—in Spanish: Oficina del Comisionado de Instituciones Financieras (OCIF)—is an office of the Department of Treasury of Puerto Rico that supervises and regulates Puerto Rico's financial sector to ensure its safety and soundness, as well as to oversee a strict adherence to all applicable laws and regulations. The OCIF as a regulatory body is similar in function to the State Banking Departments found in the 50 states. However, Puerto Rico being a commonwealth territory, its functions and legal enforcement are more broad as it is empowered to issue banking licenses under Puerto Rico law which are not under direct federal supervision, such as International Banking Entities and International Finance Entities. The OCIF follows examination guidance issued by the Federal Financial Institutions Examination Council (FFIEC), a formal interagency body empowered to prescribe uniform principles for the examination of financial institutions in the U.S., including institutions regulated by the Federal Reserve Board of Governors and the Office of the Comptroller of the Currency (OCC). Ángel Luis Rosas Collazo served as its first commissioner.

== Loss of Accreditation ==
The Office of the Commissioner of Financial Institutions (OCIF, in Spanish) lost its accreditation with the Conference of State Bank Supervisors (CSBS), an entity that monitors the procedures and operations of state agencies that regulate financial institutions in the United States, the CSBS confirmed to the Center for Investigative Journalism (CPI, in Spanish). The loss of accreditation by the OCIF is a matter of concern and should not be taken lightly, especially in a country like Puerto Rico where there is a lack of commitment to oversight, accountability and transparency in the decisions and operations of government agencies and entities. This is stated in a communication from the Organization Ayuda Legal Puerto Rico (ALPR), in view of the decision of the Conference of State Bank Supervisors (CSBS) to suspend the accreditation of the regulator of banking and financial institutions in Puerto Rico. This entity is in charge of evaluating the procedures and operations of the agencies that regulate financial and banking institutions in the United States. The loss of OCIF's accreditation was made public through a report by the Investigative Press Center.
