= OFG Bancorp =

Financial holding company located in San Juan, Puerto Rico

- Company type: Public
- Traded as: NYSE: OFG; S&P 600 Component
- Industry: Finance and Insurance
- Founded: Humacao, Puerto Rico; 1964
- Headquarters: San Juan, Puerto Rico
- Key people: Jose Rafael Fernandez, Chief Executive Officer, Chairman Maritza Arizmendi Díaz, CFO
- Products: Banking; Checking accounts Insurance; Stock brokerage Asset-based lending Consumer finance
- Revenue: ▲US$ 729.81 million (2025)
- Net income: ▲US$ 205.10 million (2025)
- Total assets: ▲US$ 12.378 billion (2025)
- Total equity: ▲US$ 1.394 billion (2025)
- Number of employees: 2,185 (2025)
- Website: www.ofgbancorp.com

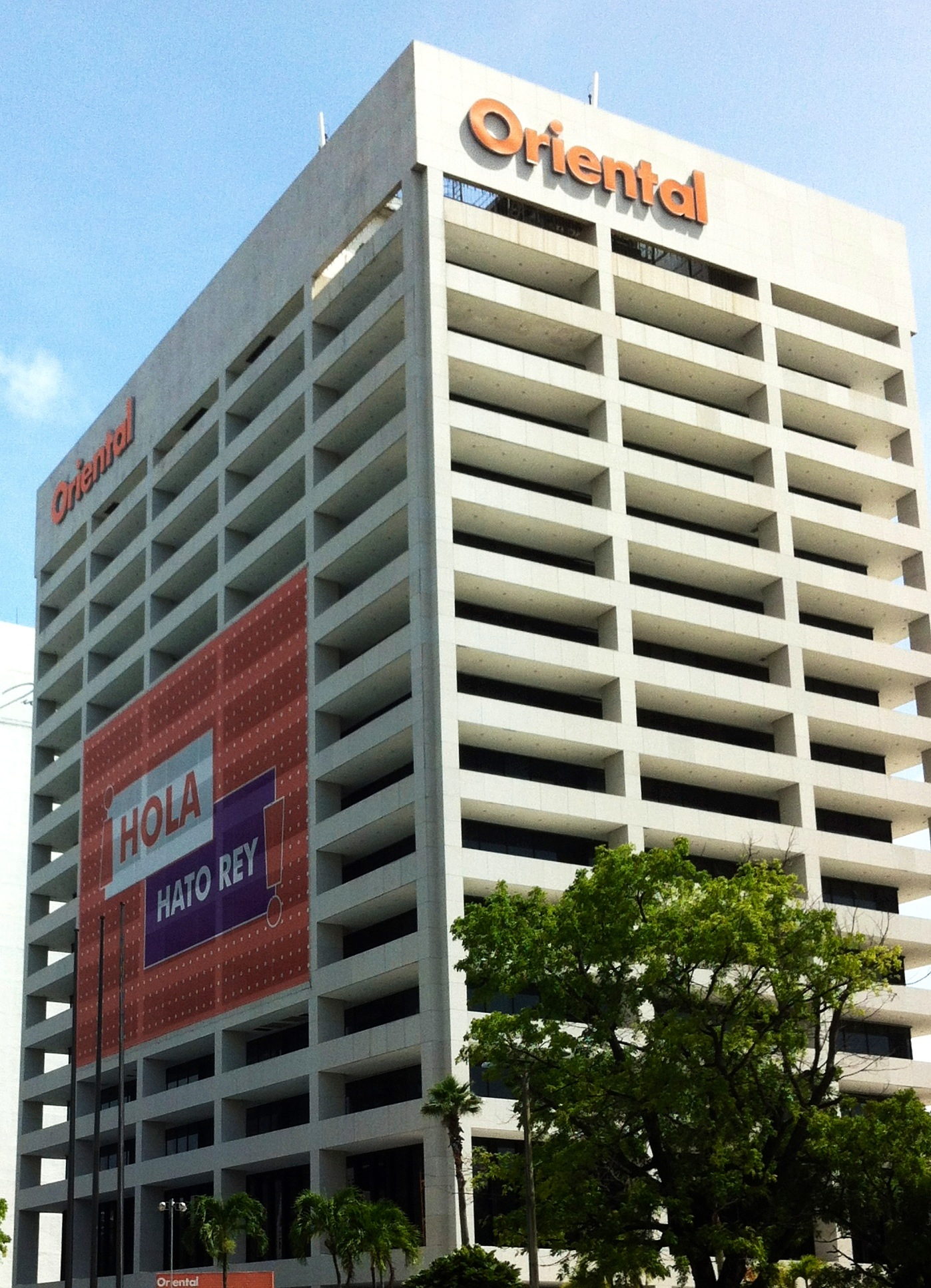
OFG Bancorp headquarters

OFG Bancorp, founded in 1964, is the financial holding company for Oriental Bank, located in San Juan, Puerto Rico. OFG offers a wide range of retail and commercial banking, lending and wealth management products, services and technology, primarily in Puerto Rico and the U.S. Virgin Islands through its principal subsidiaries: Oriental Bank, Oriental Financial Services LLC, and Oriental Insurance LLC. Its headquarters are located at Oriental Center, 254 Muñoz Rivera Avenue, San Juan, PR 00918. OFG Bancorp has $12.4 billion in assets (2025), and approximately 2,185 employees (2025).

In 2010, Oriental acquired failed competitor Eurobank. In late 2012, Oriental completed the acquisition of Spain's Banco Bilbao Vizcaya Argentaria's Puerto Rican unit for $500 million in cash.

The company changed its name to OFG Bancorp from Oriental Financial Group in 2013.

In 2019, OFG Bancorp acquired all operations of Scotiabank within Puerto Rico and The United States Virgin Islands territories as part of a $550M cash deal.

In 2023, OFG CEO José Rafael Fernández was named American Banker's Community Banker of the Year. Fernández credited the honor to the efforts of the entire team at Oriental over the last 20 years. He was named Chairman of OFG Bancorp in 2024.

== Subsidiaries ==
- Oriental Bank
- Oriental Financial Services LLC
- Oriental Insurance LLC
