= Asset-based lending =

Form of loan

Asset-based lending is any kind of lending secured by an asset. This means, if the loan is not repaid, the asset is taken. In this sense, a mortgage is an example of an asset-based loan. More commonly however, the phrase is used to describe lending to business and large corporations using assets not normally used in other loans. Typically, the different types of asset-based loans include accounts receivable financing, inventory financing, equipment financing, or real estate financing. Asset-based lending in this more specific sense is possible only in certain countries whose legal systems allow borrowers to pledge such assets to lenders as collateral for loans (through the creation of enforceable security interests).

== Usage ==
Asset-based lending is usually done when the normal routes of raising funds is not possible, such as the capital markets (selling bonds to investors) and normal unsecured or mortgage secured bank. This is often because the company has exhausted other capital raising options or needs more immediate capital for project financing needs (such as inventory purchases, mergers, acquisitions, and debt purchasing). Asset-based loans are also usually accompanied by lower interest rates, as in the event of a default the lender can recoup its investment by seizing and liquidating the assets tied to the loan.

Many financial services companies now use asset-based lending package of structured and leveraged financial services. Many banks, both national investment banks (e.g. Citi, J.P. Morgan, Wells Fargo, Goldman Sachs, Morgan Stanley, et al.) and regional banks, offer these services to corporate clients.

Asset-based lenders are known for taking out tombstone ads in much the same way as investment banks.

An example of asset-based loan usage was when the global securitization market shrank to an all-time low after the collapse of investment bank Lehman Brothers Holdings Inc in 2008. Within Europe in 2008, over 710 billion euros worth of bonds were issued, backed largely by asset-based loans, such as home and auto loans.

Asset-based lending, once considered a last-resort finance option, has become a popular choice for companies and individuals that do not have the credit ratings, track record, or patience to pursue more traditional capital sources.

== Features of asset-based loans ==
=== Asset-based loans ===
An asset-based business line of credit is usually designed for the same purpose as a normal business line of credit: to allow the company to bridge itself between the timing of cashflows of payments it receives and expenses. The primary timing issue involves what are known as accounts receivables—the delay between selling something to a customer and receiving payment for it.

A non-asset-based line of credit will have a credit limit set on account opening by the accounts receivables size, to ensure that it is used for the correct purpose. An asset-based line of credit however, will generally have a revolving credit limit that fluctuates based on the actual accounts-receivable balances that the company has on an ongoing basis. This requires the lender to monitor and audit the company to evaluate the accounts receivable size, but also allows for larger limit lines of credits and can allow companies to borrow that which it normally would not be able. Generally, terms stipulating seizure of collateral in the event of default allow the lender to profitably collect the money owed to the company should the company default on its obligations.

=== Factoring receivables ===
Factoring of receivables is a subset of asset-based lending (which uses inventory or other assets as collateral). The lender mitigates its risk by controlling with whom the company does business to make sure that the company's customers can actually pay.

Lines of credit may require that the company deposit all of its funds into a "blocked" account. The lender then approves any withdrawals from that account by the company and controls when the company pays down the line of credit balance.

=== Pledging receivables ===
Still another subset of a collateralized loan is a pledging of receivables and an assignment of receivables as collateral for the debt. In these instances, receivables are transferred to the lender when they are pledged as collateral. When the receivables are pledged as collateral, or assigned with the condition that the lender has recourse in the event the receivables are uncollectible, the receivables continue to be reported as the borrower's asset on the borrower's balance sheet and only a footnote is required to indicate these receivables are used as collateral for debt. The debt is reported as a liability on the borrower's balance sheet and as an asset (specifically, a receivable) on the lender’s balance sheet.

In some situations, the lender can actually repledge or sell the collateral the borrower used to secure the loan from the lender. In this instance, the borrower continues to recognize the receivables as an asset on its balance sheet, and the lender only records the liability associated with the obligation to return the asset.

== See also ==
- Asset-backed security
- Revolving credit
- Debt-trap diplomacy
