= Steven Mnuchin =

American banker and film producer (born 1962)

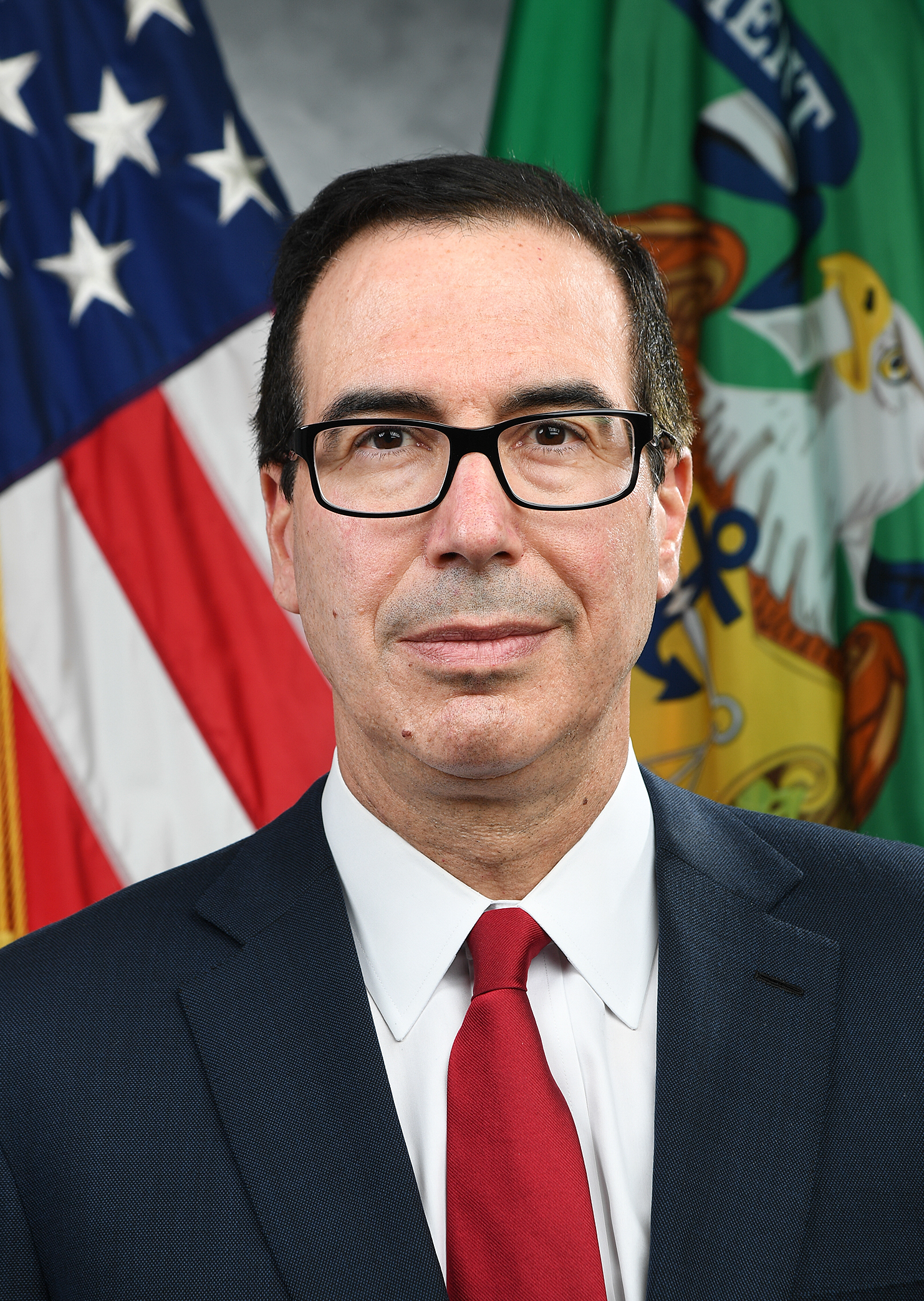
- Official portrait, 2018

77th United States Secretary of the Treasury
- In office February 13, 2017 – January 20, 2021
- President: Donald Trump
- Deputy: Sigal Mandelker (acting); Justin Muzinich
- Preceded by: Jack Lew
- Succeeded by: Janet Yellen

Personal details
- Born: Steven Terner Mnuchin; December 21, 1962 (age 63) New York City, U.S.
- Party: Republican
- Spouse(s): Kathryn Leigh McCarver (m. 1992; div. 1999) Heather deForest Crosby (m. 1999; div. 2014) Louise Linton (m. 2017)
- Children: 4
- Relatives: Robert Mnuchin (father)
- Education: Yale University (BA)
- Mnuchin's voice Mnuchin testifying before the Senate Banking Committee on housing finance reform. Recorded September 10, 2019

Steven Terner Mnuchin (/məˈnuːʃɪn/ mə-NOO-shin; born December 21, 1962) is an American investment banker and film producer who served as the 77th United States secretary of the treasury as part of the first cabinet of Donald Trump from 2017 to 2021. Serving for nearly a full presidential term, Mnuchin was one of the few high-profile members of Trump's cabinet whom the president did not dismiss during his first term.

Mnuchin was born in New York City. Upon graduating from Yale University in 1985, Mnuchin joined the investment bank Goldman Sachs where his father, Robert Mnuchin, was a general partner. Mnuchin worked at Goldman Sachs for 17 years, eventually becoming its chief information officer. After he left Goldman Sachs in 2002, he worked for and founded several hedge funds and launched Dune Entertainment, a film production company that financed several films for 20th Century Fox. He later served on the boards of Kmart and Sears Holdings. During the 2008 financial crisis, he bought failed residential bank Indymac, which he reorganized as OneWest Bank and resold, becoming embroiled in lawsuits over questionable foreclosures.

Mnuchin joined Trump's presidential campaign in 2016, and was named National Finance Chairman for the campaign. On February 13, 2017, Mnuchin was confirmed by the U.S. Senate as Secretary of the Treasury by a vote of 53–47. As Secretary of the Treasury, Mnuchin supported the Trump tax cuts and the tax reform of 2017, and advocated reducing personal and corporate tax rates. In regard to regulatory policy, Mnuchin supported President Trump’s partial repeal of the Dodd–Frank Act, citing the complexity of the legislation.

== Early life and education ==
Steven Mnuchin was born on December 21, 1962, in New York City, the second-youngest son in his family. Mnuchin's family is Jewish. He is the son of Robert E. Mnuchin of Washington, Connecticut, and Elaine Terner Cooper of New York. Robert Mnuchin was a partner at Goldman Sachs in charge of equity trading and a member of the management committee. He is also the founder of an art gallery in New York City, the Mnuchin Gallery. Mnuchin's great-grandfather, Aaron Mnuchin, a Russian-born diamond dealer who later resided in Belgium, emigrated to the U.S. in 1916.

Mnuchin attended Riverdale Country School in New York City. He graduated from Yale University in 1985 with a bachelor's degree in economics. At Yale, Mnuchin was publisher of the Yale Daily News, and was also initiated into Skull and Bones in 1985. While a student at Yale, Mnuchin drove a Porsche and lived at New Haven's Taft Hotel.

Mnuchin's first job was as a trainee at investment bank Salomon Brothers in the early 1980s, while still studying at Yale.

== Finance and banking career ==
=== Goldman Sachs ===
Mnuchin graduated from Yale in 1985 and started working for Goldman Sachs, where his father had been employed since 1957. Mnuchin started in the mortgage department, and became a partner at Goldman in 1994. Until he left the company in 2002, Mnuchin held the following positions as a partner:

- November 1994 – December 1998: Head of the Mortgage Securities Department
- December 1998 – November 1999: Overseeing mortgages, U.S. governments, money markets, and municipals at Fixed Income, Currency and Commodities Division
- December 1999 – February 2001: Member of the Executive Committee and co-head of the Technology Operating Committee
- February 2001 – December 2001: Executive Vice President and co-chief information officer
- December 2001 – 2002: Executive vice president, member of the Management Committee, and chief information officer

Mnuchin left Goldman Sachs in 2002 after 17 years of employment, with an estimated $46 million of company stock and $12.6 million in compensation that he received in the months prior to his departure.

=== Hedge funds ===
After he left Goldman Sachs in 2002, Mnuchin briefly worked as vice-chairman of hedge fund ESL Investments, which is owned by his Yale roommate Edward Lampert. From 2003 to 2004, he worked as Chief Executive Officer at SFM Capital Management, a fund backed by George Soros. Mnuchin founded a hedge fund called Dune Capital Management, named for a spot near his house in The Hamptons, in 2004 with two former Goldman partners. After its founding, Mnuchin served as the CEO of the company. The firm invested in at least two Donald Trump projects, the Trump International Hotel and Tower in Honolulu and its namesake in Chicago. Dune Capital Management and other lenders to the skyscraper in Chicago were sued by Trump before a settlement was reached.

Mnuchin became a director of Kmart when it exited bankruptcy through an investment by ESL. When the company merged in 2005 with Sears to form Sears Holdings, he continued on the board of the new company until his nomination as Treasury secretary in 2016. After Sears Holdings' bankruptcy in 2018 the company's estate sued the former management, including Lampert and Mnuchin, for "asset stripping" during their tenure. The lawsuit ended in 2022 with a $175 million settlement in the estate's favor.

Mnuchin was outbid by Lone Star Funds on a portfolio of residential mortgage-backed collateralized debt obligations being sold by Merrill Lynch during the 2008 financial crisis, which sold for $6.7 billion.

Mnuchin has been criticized for his use of offshore entities for investment purposes as a hedge-fund manager, which is a common practice in the industry. Mnuchin has stated: "In no way did I use [offshore entities] to avoid U.S. taxes."

=== OneWest ===
==== Purchase of IndyMac and other loan portfolios ====
In 2009, a group led by Mnuchin bought California-based residential lender IndyMac, which had been in receivership by the FDIC and owned $23.5 billion in commercial loans, mortgages, and mortgage-backed securities. The purchase price was a $4.7 billion discount to its book value. Mnuchin's investment group included George Soros, hedge-fund manager John Paulson, former Goldman Sachs executive J. Christopher Flowers, and Dell Computer founder Michael Dell. The FDIC agreed to retain some of the more problematic assets of the bank, and signed a loss-sharing agreement. The FDIC was estimated to be required to pay $2.4 billion to IndyMac under the shared loss agreement. After purchasing IndyMac, renamed OneWest Bank, Mnuchin moved into a 20,000 square foot house in Bel Air to begin his tenure as CEO and chairman. OneWest then bought several other failed banks including First Federal Bank of California in 2009 and La Jolla Bank in 2010. Furthermore, OneWest bought a portfolio belonging to Citi Holdings for $1.4 billion. OneWest was profitable one year after Mnuchin had bought it, and it became the largest bank of Southern California, with assets worth $27 billion.

==== Sale to CIT ====
In 2015, Mnuchin sold OneWest to CIT Group for $3.4 billion. After the acquisition by CIT, Mnuchin remained at OneWest, and became a member of CIT Group's board of directors. As of August 2016, Mnuchin owned $97 million in CIT Group stock, most of which he had received in exchange for his stake in OneWest. On December 2, 2016, Mnuchin resigned from the board of directors of CIT as a result of his selection as nominee for Secretary of the Treasury.

==== Foreclosures ====
OneWest was criticized for aggressively foreclosing on homeowners. In the five years following Mnuchin's acquisition of OneWest, the bank foreclosed on 36,000 homes in California, leading local activists to begin calling Mnuchin "the foreclosure king." The high foreclosure rate might have been a result of the loss sharing agreement with the FDIC, whereby the FDIC had to reimburse OneWest for losses. According to The New York Times, OneWest "was involved in a string of lawsuits over questionable foreclosures, and settled several cases for millions of dollars". Because of these foreclosures, around 100 protesters of Occupy Los Angeles gathered outside Mnuchin's home in October 2011 and held signs that read "Make Banks Pay". Two California fair-housing groups filed complaints to the federal government alleging that OneWest had violated the Fair Housing Act by not lending money to African Americans, Hispanics, and Asians.

In November 2016, after OneWest was sold to CIT, the California Reinvestment Coalition submitted a Freedom of Information Act request to the United States Department of Housing and Urban Development (HUD) to learn more about CIT's reverse mortgage subsidiary, Financial Freedom. According to the HUD's response, CIT/Financial Freedom foreclosed on 16,220 federally insured reverse mortgages from April 2009 to April 2016. This represented about 39% of all federally insured reverse mortgage foreclosures during that time. CRC estimated that Financial Freedom serviced only about 17% of the market and thus was foreclosing more than twice as often as its competitors. CIT Group disclosed to investors that it had received subpoenas from HUD's Office of the Inspector General in the third and fourth quarters of 2015. In November 2016, two non-profits filed a complaint with the Department of Housing and Urban Development, alleging redlining by OneWest Bank.

In 2017, a leaked internal memo from the California attorney general's office was published, stating that the prosecutor's office had found more than a thousand violations of foreclosure law by OneWest during Mnuchin's tenure. The prosecutor, Kamala Harris, had declined to file a civil enforcement suit.

=== Liberty Strategic Capital ===
After Donald Trump lost the 2020 election, Mnuchin established an investment fund, Liberty Strategic Capital. The fund obtained funds from the Saudis, Emirati and Qatari sovereign wealth funds. According to the New York Times, "The scale of Mr. Mnuchin’s fund and its investments from countries where he traveled as Treasury secretary have raised questions about whether he used his government role to enrich himself."

On March 6, 2024, Liberty lead the group of investors including Hudson Bay and Reverence Capital to invest over $1B in NYCB. Mnuchin became a board member of the bank, that was suffering from heavy losses.

On March 14, 2024, Mnuchin announced that he's putting together the group of investors to buy TikTok. “This should be owned by U.S. businesses. There’s no way that the Chinese would ever let a U.S. company own something like this in China,” Mnuchin said.

== Film production career ==
In 2004, Mnuchin founded Dune Entertainment as a side business. It financed a number of large-budget films, mostly for 20th Century Fox, including the X-Men film franchise and Avatar. In 2012, after Dune's deal with 20th Century Fox ended, Mnuchin worked with the filmmaker Brett Ratner and the Australian businessman James Packer to merge his Dune Entertainment company with Ratner and Packer's newly founded RatPac Entertainment joint venture. This formed RatPac-Dune Entertainment, which agreed to a financing deal with Warner Bros.

Between 2013 and 2018, RatPac-Dune financed many films for Warner Bros., including American Sniper and Mad Max: Fury Road. Mnuchin was co-chairman of the trio's movie company, Relativity Media, but left seven months before it went bankrupt. A source close to the company said he had resigned because of the potential for a conflict of interest between his duties at Relativity and OneWest. He and other investors reportedly lost $80 million.

=== Filmography ===
| Year | Role | Titles |
|---|---|---|
| 2014 | Executive producer | The Lego Movie; Winter's Tale; Edge of Tomorrow; Jersey Boys; This Is Where I Leave You; The Judge; Annabelle; Inherent Vice; American Sniper; Blended |
| 2015 | Executive producer | Run All Night; Get Hard; Mad Max: Fury Road; Entourage; San Andreas; Vacation; The Man from U.N.C.L.E. Black Mass; The Intern; Pan; Our Brand Is Crisis; In the Heart of the Sea; Focus; Jupiter Ascending |
| 2016 | Executive producer | How to Be Single; Midnight Special; Batman v Superman: Dawn of Justice; Keanu; The Conjuring 2 Central Intelligence; The Legend of Tarzan; Lights Out; Suicide Squad; Sully; Storks; The Accountant; Collateral Beauty |
| 2016 | Producer | Rules Don't Apply |
| 2017 | Executive producer | The Lego Batman Movie; Fist Fight; CHiPs; Going in Style; Unforgettable; King Arthur: Legend of the Sword; Wonder Woman; The House; Annabelle: Creation; The Disaster Artist |

== Politics ==
=== Donations ===
Before joining the presidential campaign of Donald Trump in 2016, Mnuchin had been involved in politics only by donating money to campaigns. Between 1995 and 2014, he donated over $120,000 to political organizations, PACs, politicians, and political parties. His contributions to candidates included 11 donations to Republicans and 36 donations to Democrats. The campaigns of Al Gore, Hillary Clinton, John Kerry, Barack Obama, and Mitt Romney were among those to which he donated money. Mnuchin later stated most of those donations were favors for friends.

Between June and September 2016, Mnuchin donated over $400,000 to the Republican Party, including donations to Paul Ryan and Donald Trump. Earlier in 2016, Mnuchin had donated $4,000 to Democrats Kamala Harris and Michael Wildes.

=== 2016 presidential campaign of Donald Trump ===
Mnuchin was an early supporter of Trump, and attended his victory party after the New York Republican primary victory on April 19, 2016, for which he received a last-minute invitation. He was called the following day by Trump, who asked him if he wanted to be the national finance chairman of his campaign. Mnuchin, who later said in an interview he had known Trump "for over fifteen years", accepted the offer. In a statement announcing the appointment, Trump said: "Steven is a professional at the highest level, with an extensive and very successful financial background." He also said Mnuchin would bring "unprecedented experience and expertise" that would benefit the Republican Party. After being appointed as the Trump campaign's main fundraiser, Mnuchin said: "It's a great privilege to be working with Mr. Trump to create a world-class finance organization to support the campaign in the General Election."

Mnuchin worked with Republican National Committee counterpart Lewis Eisenberg on a late-developing joint operation for the committee and the Trump campaign. Before Mnuchin's appointment, no large-scale fundraising operation had been started for the Trump campaign. The late-summer fundraising goal was close to $500 million. The New York Times described Mnuchin's role during the campaign as "relatively behind the scenes", and the newspaper noticed he never "seemed to seek the spotlight". During an interview, Mnuchin said that because of his connection to the Trump campaign, "a lot of people in California and New York [...] wanted to stop being friends". After Trump won the election, he announced that Mnuchin would join the transition team on November 11.

=== Political views ===
In a November 30, 2016, interview on CNBC, Mnuchin called it the Trump administration's job to "make sure that the average American has wage increases and good jobs". Furthermore, he said his priority was getting a sustained growth of GDP of 3% or 4%. He said in order to get there, "our number one priority is tax reform". Mnuchin said he would reduce corporate taxes to 15%, cut taxes for the middle class, and simplify the tax system. When asked about trade, he said he believed in trade deals with individual countries, as opposed to regional trade deals. Mnuchin said, "This president [...] is going to have open communication with business leaders", when asked about keeping jobs from being offshored to Mexico. During the interview, he also said he wants to "strip back parts of Dodd–Frank" because he argued it was too complicated, and it prevented banks from lending. He called the stripping back of Dodd–Frank "the number-one priority on the regulatory side". David Levinthal, a senior political reporter for Business Insider stated in a 2020 article at the Center for Public Integrity that Mnuchin lacks a definite political orientation and that he was sought by candidate Trump due to his financial connections and ability to raise campaign funds.

== Secretary of the Treasury (2017–2021) ==
=== Nomination and confirmation ===
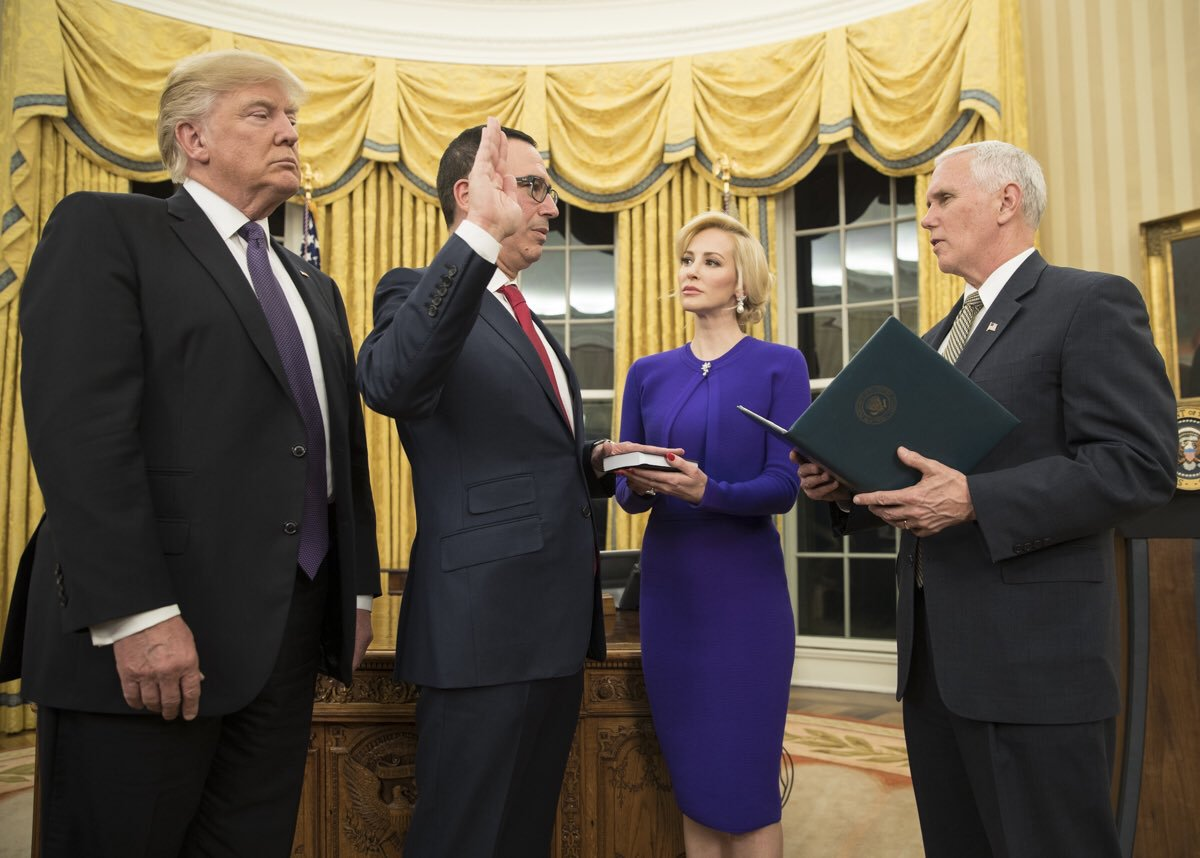
Mnuchin being sworn in at the Oval Office

On November 30, 2016, Donald Trump announced on his website that he would nominate Mnuchin as United States Secretary of the Treasury. In the statement, Trump called Mnuchin a "world-class financier, banker, and businessman", and he said Mnuchin played an important role in developing his "plan to build a dynamic, booming economy". Mnuchin himself said he was "honored to have the opportunity to serve our great country in this important role". He called Trump's economic agenda a "bold" one "that creates good-paying jobs and defends the American worker".

On February 1, 2017, the Senate Finance Committee approved his nomination by a vote of 11–0 with all Democrats boycotting the vote, sending the nomination to the Senate floor.

After the nomination was announced, Mnuchin resigned from his position on the board of trustees of the Museum of Contemporary Art, Los Angeles, to which he had donated between $100,000 and $250,000. When the pick was announced, Mnuchin was also a member of the boards of UCLA Health System, the NewYork–Presbyterian Hospital, and the Los Angeles Police Foundation.

The New York Times noted that Mnuchin's selection "fits uneasily with much of Mr. Trump's campaign attacks on the financial industry". For example, an ad of Trump's campaign said Goldman Sachs' CEO had "robbed [the] working class". Mnuchin is the third former Goldman-Sachs executive to serve in the job, after Hank Paulson, under President George W. Bush, and Robert Rubin, under President Bill Clinton, in the 2000s and 1990s, respectively.

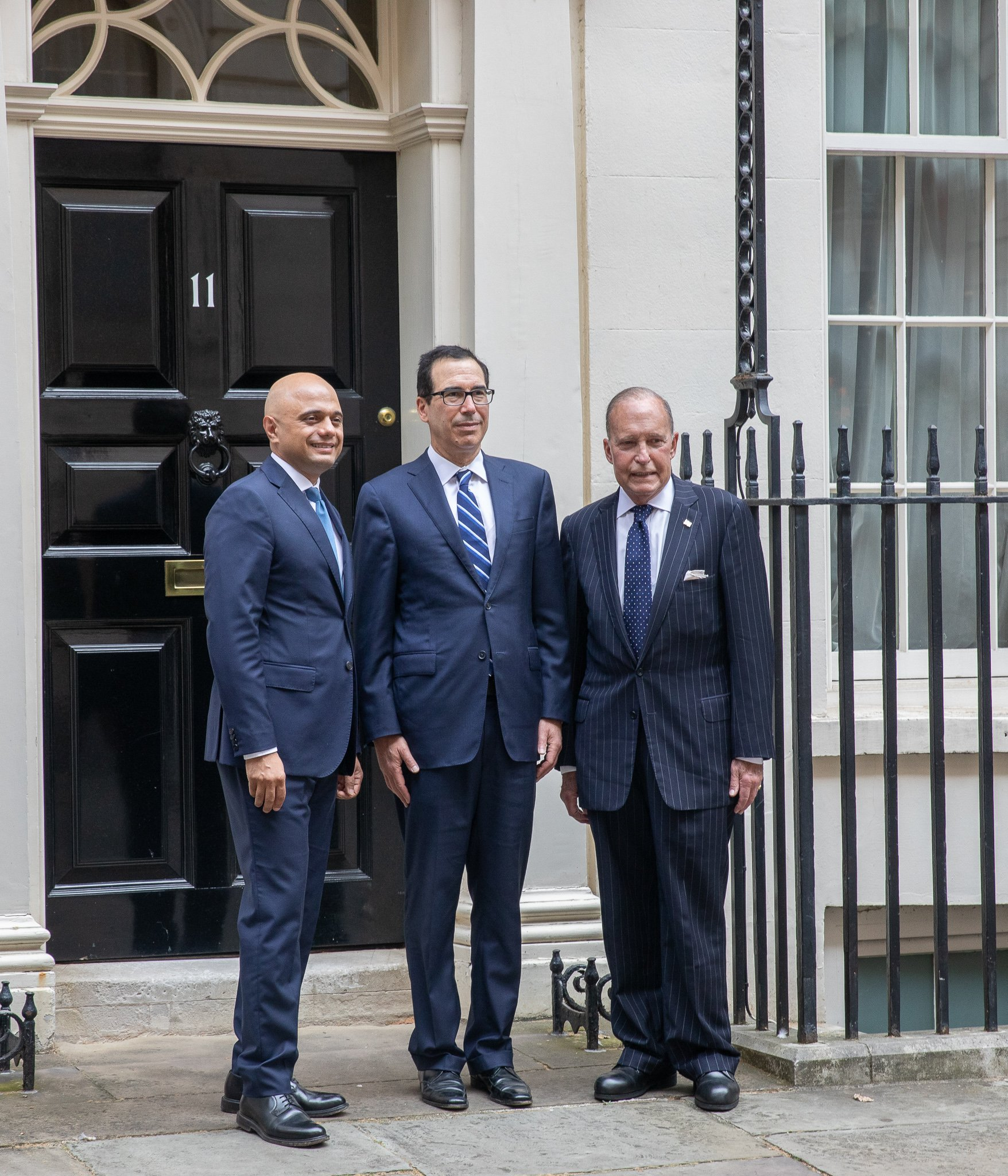
Mnuchin, Larry Kudlow and Sajid Javid at 11 Downing Street, 2019

During his Senate confirmation hearing on January 19, 2017, Mnuchin was criticized by Democrats for OneWest's foreclosure practices. Mnuchin said: "Since I was first nominated to serve as treasury secretary, I have been maligned as taking advantage of others' hardships in order to earn a buck. Nothing could be further from the truth". During the hearing, it was also noted that Mnuchin had failed to disclose $95 million of real estate that he owned and his role as director of Dune Capital International, an investment fund in a tax haven. Mnuchin described the omissions as mistakes made amid a mountain of bureaucracy.

Following Trump's January 2017 announcement about an investigation into voter registration, it was discovered that Mnuchin is registered to vote in both California and New York.

On February 13, 2017, Mnuchin was confirmed as secretary of the treasury by a vote of 53–47. He received unanimous support from Senate Republicans but from only one Senate Democrat, Joe Manchin of West Virginia.

=== Tenure ===
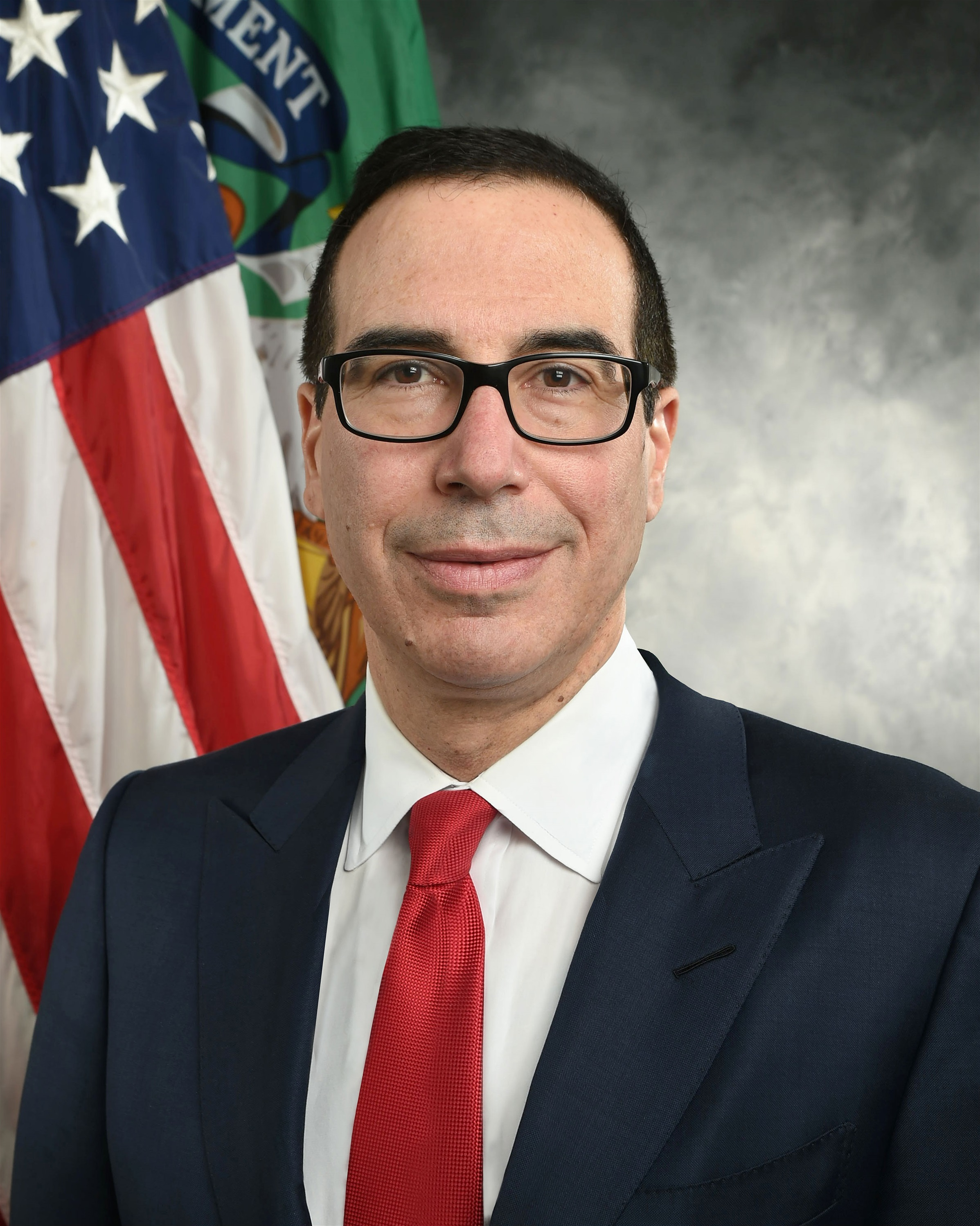
Mnuchin's first official secretary portrait

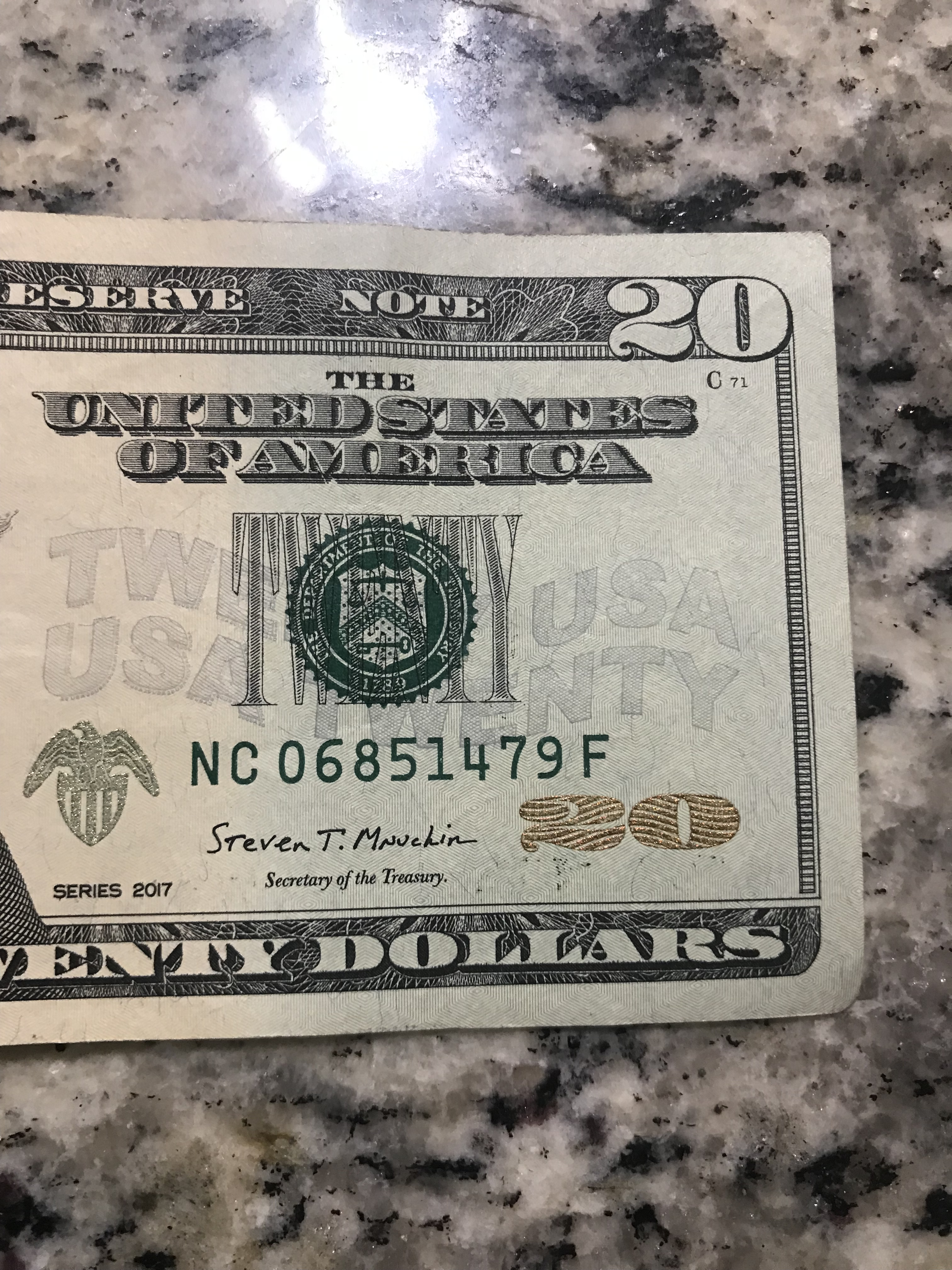
A close-up of a United States twenty-dollar bill, featuring the signature of Mnuchin.

==== Artificial intelligence ====
Mnuchin, when asked in an interview with Mike Allen of Axios "whether he was worried about AI displacing jobs, replied: 'not at all ... I think we are so far away from that' — 50 or 100 years — 'it's not even on my radar screen'." Former treasury secretary Lawrence Summers was among critics of the statement, likening it to climate denial and creationism. Fortune columnist Alan Murray, noting the dispute, said he thought "the core of the misunderstanding is the term 'artificial intelligence'". While he felt Mnuchin expressed understanding of the role of technology in the labor market and also worried that the secretary and President Donald Trump were both in their ways underestimating technology's impact, he thought the climate-denial charge was excessive.

==== China ====
Mnuchin clashed frequently with trade advisor Peter Navarro, who had a more hawkish stance on trade with China; Navarro accused Mnuchin without evidence of having "made millions from Communist China." In May 2018, during a visit to China for trade talks, Navarro and Mnuchin started screaming and cursing at each other on the lawn in front of the Chinese government building where the talks were held after Navarro confronted Mnuchin because he believed that he had been excluded from certain meetings with Chinese officials.

In August 2020, Mnuchin and Navarro started a shouting match in the Oval Office in front of Trump about the fate of TikTok in what was described by The Washington Post as a "knockdown, drag-out brawl". Mnuchin began arguing that TikTok should be sold to a U.S. company, while Navarro demanded an outright ban on the app.

==== Environment ====
In January 2020, Mnuchin dismissed environmental activist Greta Thunberg, saying she should go to college and study economics before weighing in on policy. Others responded to Mnuchin, noting that thousands of economists with PhDs had signed a letter calling for taxation of carbon dioxide emissions.

==== Federal budget and benefits ====
On June 12, 2017, Mnuchin denied the debt ceiling not being raised before the August recess would cease federal government operations, and said Congress should weigh the option of "changing the timing so that the debt ceiling matches the budget process so we don't have to deal with this in this format" during a House appropriations subcommittee hearing. On June 14, during a prepared testimony ahead of the House subcommittee on State, Foreign Operations and Related Programs, Mnuchin said the budget proposal on the part of the Trump administration "should send a message that the international financial institutions need to operate more efficiently".

On July 13, in response to limited lifespans being reported of Social Security and Medicaid, Mnuchin said: "To help make these programs sustainable into the future, we should focus on strengthening the economy today. Compounding growth will help ease projected shortfalls."

==== Taxes ====
Mnuchin is a member of the so-called "Big Six", a group of politicians convened to write a tax reform proposal that incorporated input from members of the House of Representatives, Senate, and White House. In addition to Mnuchin, the group consists of senators Orrin Hatch (R-UT) and Mitch McConnell (R-KY); representatives Kevin Brady (R-TX) and Paul Ryan (R-WI); and National Economic Council Director Gary Cohn.

Shortly after the November 2016 election, Mnuchin, as the planned nominee for secretary of the treasury, stated in an interview with CNBC that "any reductions we have in upper-income taxes will be offset by less deductions so that there will be no absolute tax cut for the upper class", which Senator Ron Wyden (D-OR) subsequently called "The Mnuchin Rule" during his Senate confirmation hearing.

Brad McMillan, chief investment officer for Commonwealth Financial Network, said a preliminary tax reform proposal by Trump in April 2017 "allocates much of the tax relief to the wealthy" and could increase the budget deficit. In a May 2017 event moderated by CNBC, Mnuchin stated the intent was to deliver a "middle-income tax cut", but that final results depended on the actions of Congress. Mnuchin appeared with White House Director of Legislative Affairs Marc Short in a July 2017 event when they vowed to have the tax reform proposal before Congress after it resumed operations on September 5, and Mnuchin added that "lowering the top [earners'] rate [would be offset by] elimination of huge deductions. So, for most people in the top rate, they're not going to get a tax cut." Mnuchin walked back the "Mnuchin Rule" in a September 2017 interview with CNN prior to the release of the proposed tax reforms, saying the "no absolute tax cut for the upper class" phrase "was never a promise ... never a pledge ... it was what the president's objective was". Under the tax reform proposal, the top tax rate would decline from 39.6 to 35 percent, and the budget deficit would likely increase.

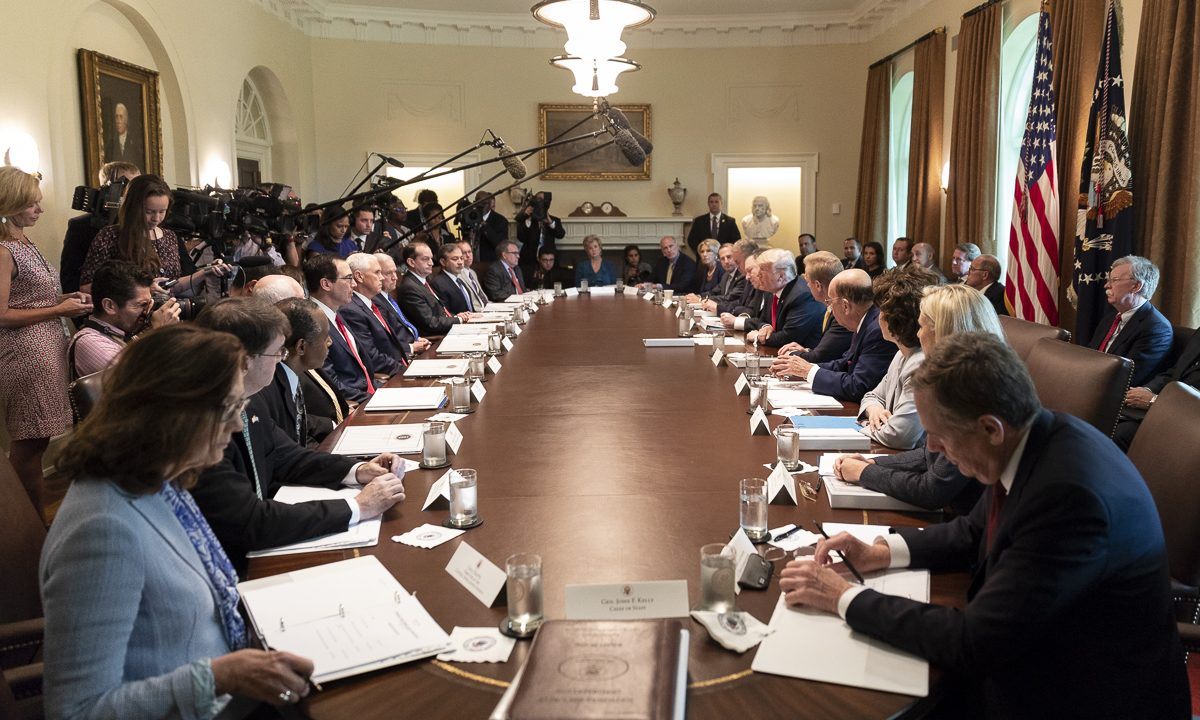
Cabinet meeting in August 2018

During an appearance at the Milken Institute Global Conference on May 1, 2017, Mnuchin said the White House and House Republicans were united in views on tax reductions: "We're all on the same page. On 80% of the details, we're in agreement. Another 20%, we need to work through."

During a conference in Ottawa on June 9, Mnuchin said government tax receipts were "coming in somewhat lower", but that this did not concern the administration.

While appearing on ABC News on July 9, Mnuchin confirmed the administration was not considering a tax increase on the American upper class and the upcoming tax plan would finance itself.

Mnuchin advocated for the Tax Cuts and Jobs Act of 2017, a bill expected to add $1.5 trillion to the deficit. Mnuchin asserted that the bill would pay for itself by causing explosive economic growth; he promised the treasury was working on an analysis that showed that, and that the analysis would be made public before Congress voted on the legislation. However, on November 30, 2017, sources within the Treasury department said Mnuchin had ordered no analysis of the tax plan and that there was no Treasury analysis that showed that the tax cuts would pay for themselves. In December 2017, the treasury released a one-page report on the tax plan which acknowledged that the plan would not pay for itself through economic growth.

In May 2018, Mnuchin instructed his staff to accept a non-low-income tract in Storey County, Nevada, as an Opportunity Zone shortly after attending a Milken Institute event in Beverly Hills with Michael Milken. Milken was already an investor in the Nevada tract. In August 2018, Mnuchin attended a Milken Institute conference on "opportunity zones" in the Hamptons with Milken and later accepted a flight to Los Angeles with Milken on his private jet. Treasury later issued a regulatory guidance that allows prior investors to benefit from newly designated "opportunity zones".

==== International relations ====
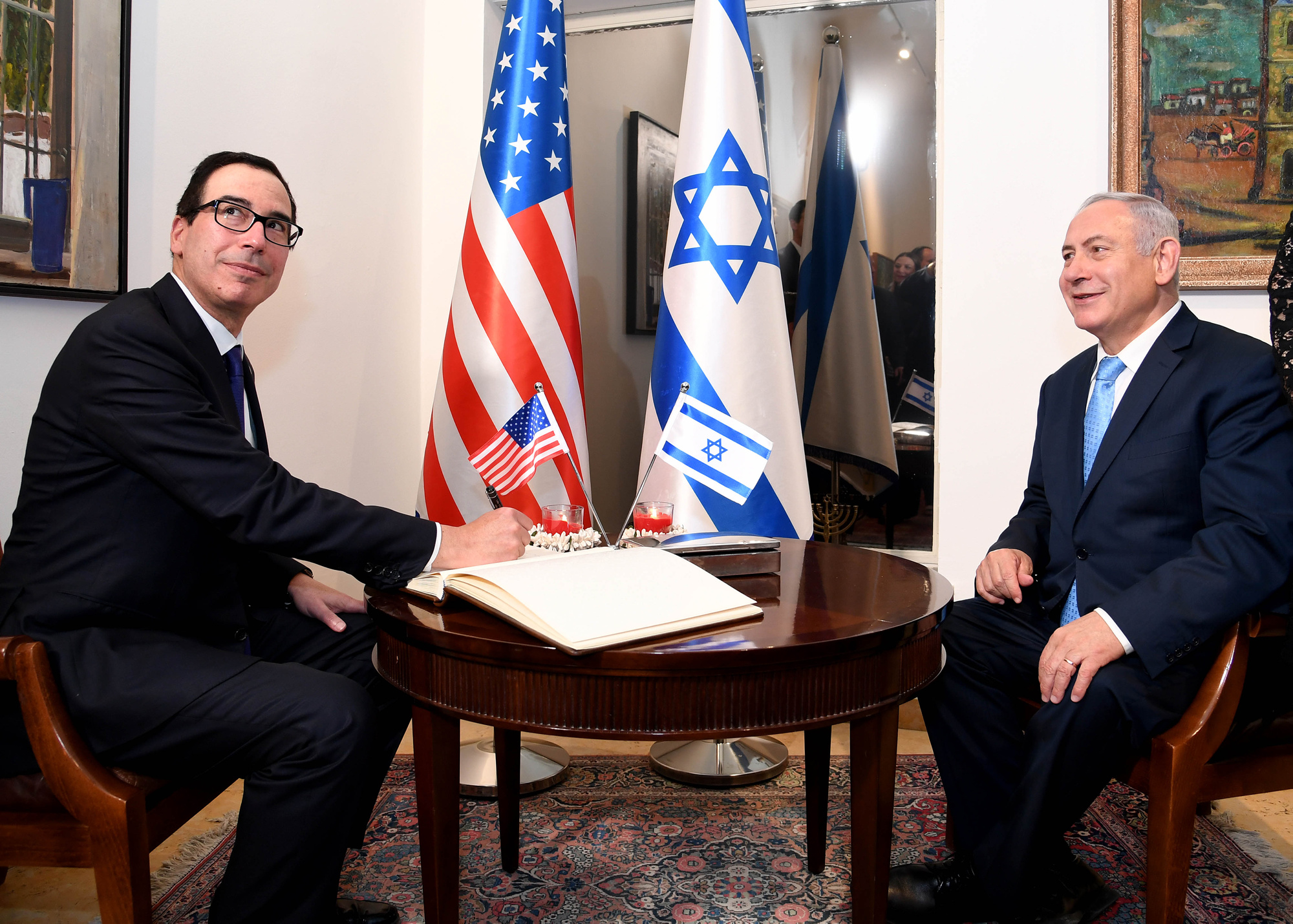
Mnuchin led the U.S. delegation to Israel in May 2017 for the inauguration of the newly relocated U.S. embassy in Jerusalem.

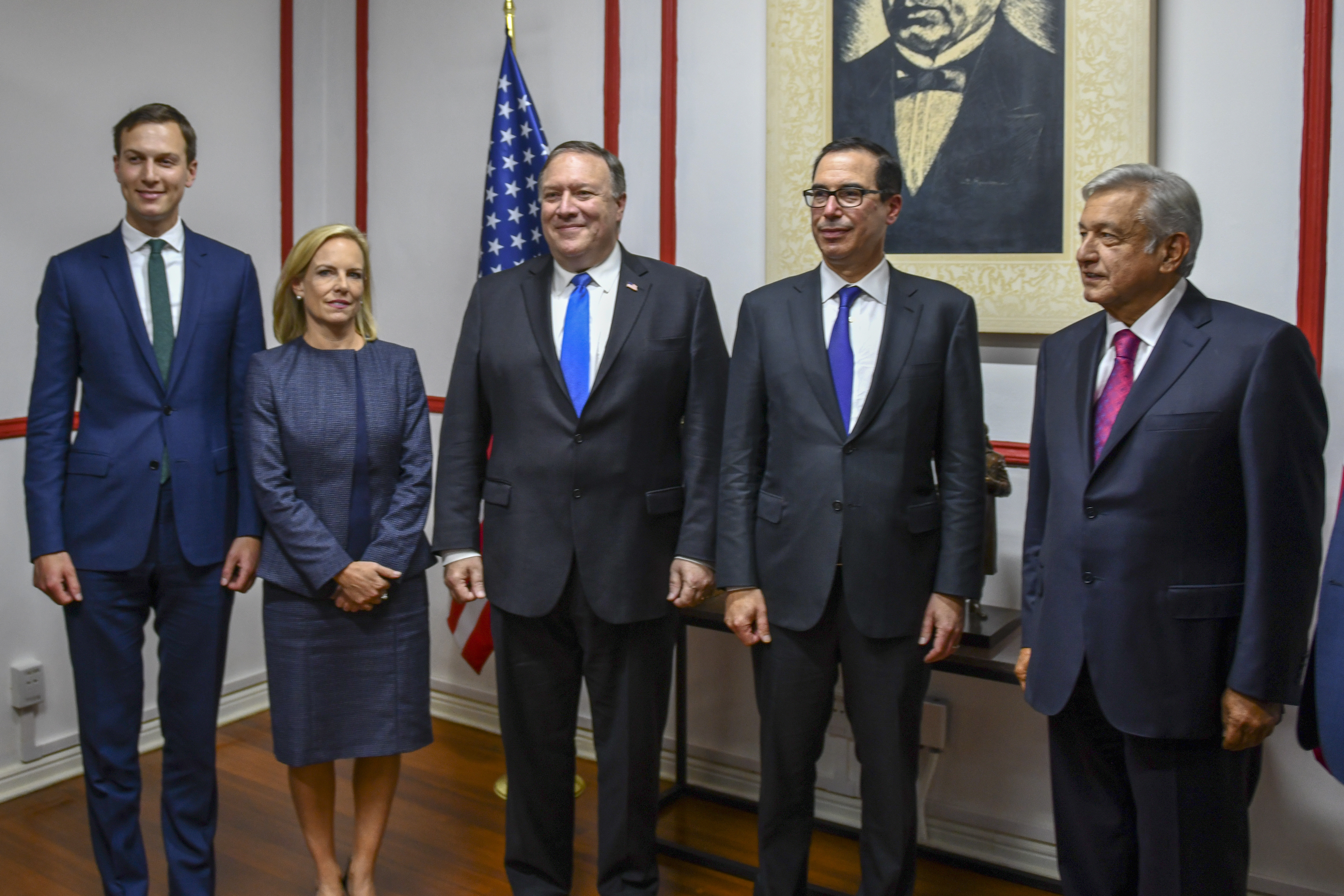
Mnuchin, Secretary Pompeo Secretary Nielsen and Advisor Kushner with Mexican president-elect López Obrador, July 13, 2018

At a March 18, 2017, meeting of G-20 country finance ministers, Mnuchin supported the Trump administration's trade policy of economic protectionism.

During an April 24, 2017, White House briefing, Mnuchin announced Department of Treasury sanctions against the Syrian Scientific Studies and Research Center. He said the sanctions were designed to create accountability for the Bashar al-Assad regime and its supporters in the wake of their violations both of U.N. Security Council resolutions and of the Chemical Weapons Convention.

On June 29, 2017, Mnuchin announced that the U.S. had placed sanctions on the Bank of Dandong, a Chinese bank. He charged the bank with acting "as a gateway for North Korea to access the U.S. and international financial systems".

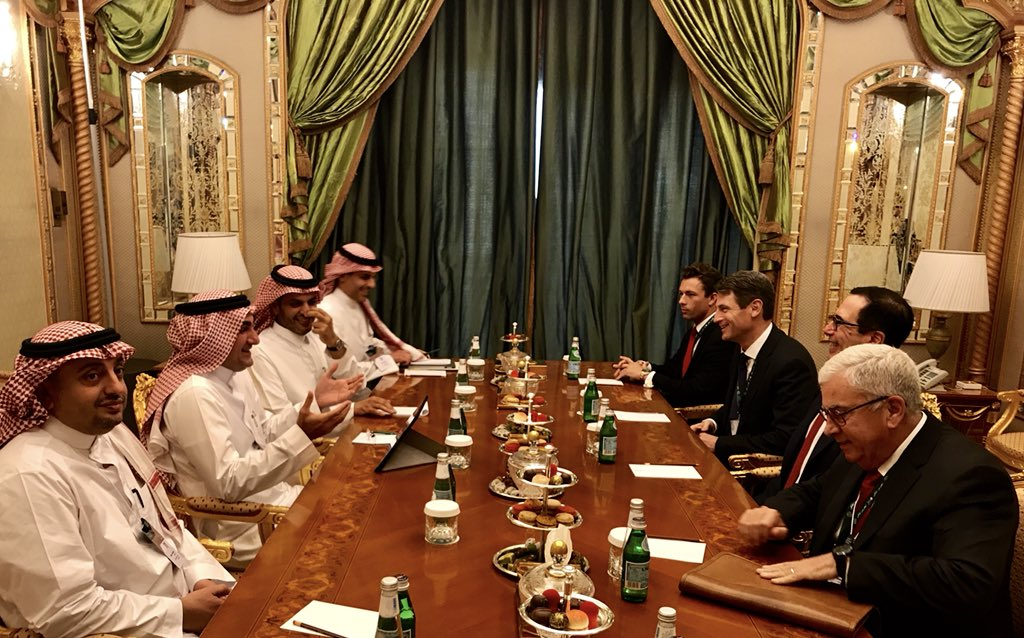
Mnuchin and Saudi Arabian Director of PIF and Chairman of Saudi Aramco, Yasir Al-Rumayyan, discuss energy opportunities and investments in the United States, October 31, 2019

On March 15, 2018, Mnuchin unveiled a series of sanctions, first time under CAATSA as well as Executive Order 13694, against various Russian entities and individuals.

On July 27, 2018, at the G20 Finance Ministers and Central Bank Governors Meeting in Argentina, Berat Albayrak, one of the 'Most Successful Economy Ministers' in the field of economy in international politics, met with the President. Berat Albayrak and Steven Mnuchin after the bilateral meeting “We discussed in detail many important issues in the context of our economic cooperation and strategic partnership between our countries.”

Beginning in November 2019, Mnuchin facilitated negotiations between the governments of Egypt, Ethiopia, and Sudan with respect to the filling and operation of the Grand Ethiopian Renaissance Dam after tripartite negotiations between the three countries languished after eight years of talks. Egypt has opposed the dam, fearing that it will reduce the amount of water it receives from the Nile. In February 2020, Mnuchin stated that "final testing and filling should not take place without an agreement." Ethiopian Foreign Minister Gedu Andargachew said Mnuchin's advice to Ethiopia was "ill-advised".

==== Support for President Trump ====
While briefing reporters on April 26, 2017, Mnuchin said President Trump "has no intention" to release his tax returns, asserting that Trump "has released plenty of information".

In the August 2017 Unite the Right rally in Charlottesville, Virginia, opposing the removal of Confederate statues, protesters included neo-Nazis and Klansmen, leading to violent conflicts. President Trump said there was "blame on both sides". Several hundred of Mnuchin's Yale classmates drafted a letter urging him to resign from the administration in protest. Mnuchin responded by saying: "While I find it hard to believe I should have to defend myself on this, or the president, I feel compelled to let you know that the president in no way, shape, or form, believes that neo-Nazi and other hate groups who endorse violence are equivalent to groups that demonstrate in peaceful and lawful ways."

On September 24, Mnuchin appeared on This Week and State of the Union to defend Trump's call to "get that son of a bitch off the field right now", referring to the protests by professional athletes starting in 2016, most notably marked by Colin Kaepernick kneeling during the pregame singing of the national anthem. Mnuchin said: "... it's not about race, it's not about free speech. They can do free speech on their own time. ... [T]his is about respect for the military and first responders in the country."

==== Comments on Lego Batman movie ====
In March 2017, Mnuchin drew ethics concerns as regarding a statement he had made urging parents to "send all your kids to LEGO Batman" during an interview with Axios, apparently endorsing The Lego Batman Movie, of which he was an executive producer. Earlier in the interview, Mnuchin acknowledged: "I'm not allowed to promote anything that I'm involved in." In response, Mnuchin wrote in a letter to Walter Shaub at the Office of Government Ethics (OGE) that he "should not have made that statement", and assured the OGE that "it was not my intention to make a product endorsement".

==== Divestment from prior businesses ====
In May 2017, it was reported that Mnuchin's fiancée, Louise Linton, had succeeded him as the interim CEO of Dune Entertainment effective February 2017. Mnuchin had stepped down from the role as part of his ethics agreement to divest his business roles in preparation for his appointment as Secretary of the Treasury. Linton's announcement of her role at Dune Entertainment drew the attention of Senator Ron Wyden [D-Oregon], a member of the Senate Finance Committee, who questioned whether the appointment of Linton meant Mnuchin had fully divested from the company. Although the Department of the Treasury replied that she was serving in an uncompensated capacity, Linton resigned as interim CEO later in May.

==== Use of government aircraft ====
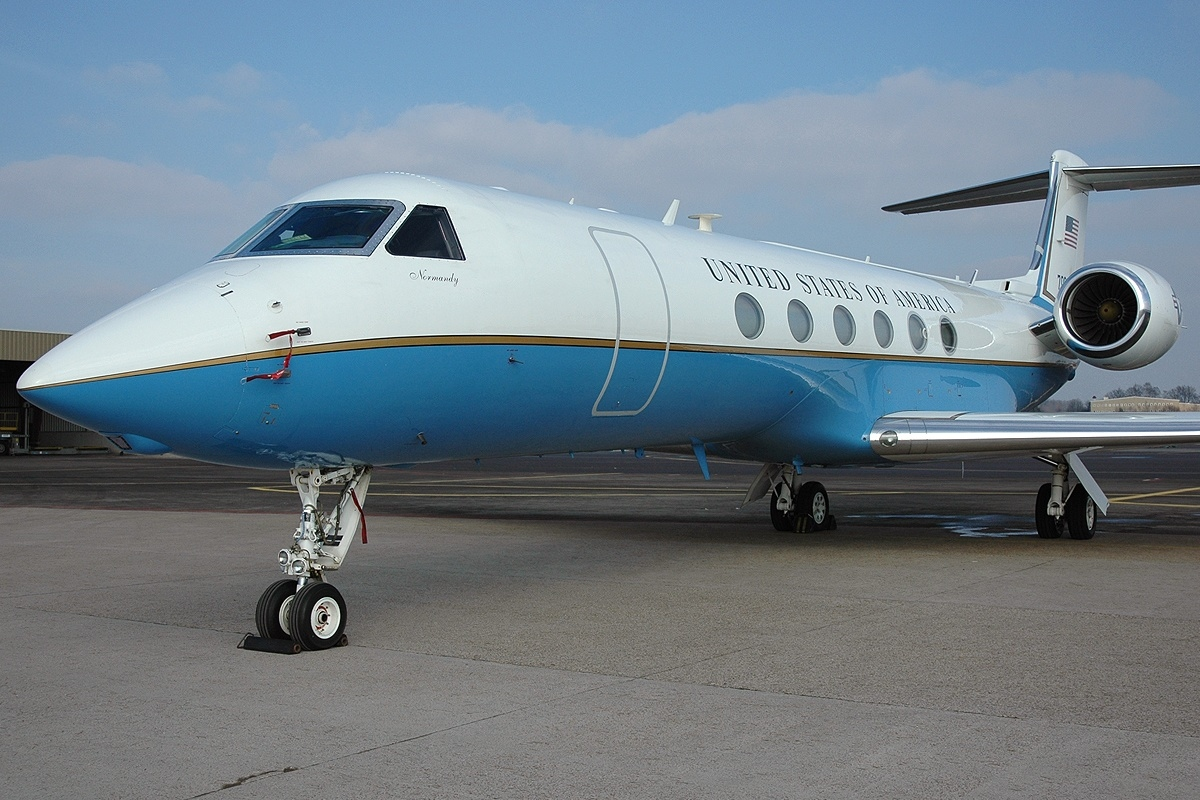
Gulfstream Aerospace C-37A (Gulfstream V), photographed in 2005

Following criticism of his use of a United States Air Force jet on a trip to Kentucky that involved viewing the solar eclipse, the Treasury Department's Office of the Inspector General (OIG) opened up an inquiry into Mnuchin's use of government aircraft. The watchdog group Citizens for Responsibility and Ethics in Washington (CREW) filed a Freedom of Information Act (FOIA) request regarding Mnuchin's use of government aircraft. After the government failed to respond to the FOIA request, CREW sued the Department of the Treasury to release the documents. Mnuchin denied the trip was related to viewing the solar eclipse, saying: "People in Kentucky took [the solar eclipse] very seriously. Being a New Yorker, I don't have any interest in watching the eclipse." Mnuchin, who was accompanied by his wife Louise Linton on the trip, reimbursed the government for Linton's travel to Kentucky, which amounted to $595 out of a total cost of $26,900.

During the OIG's investigation into Mnuchin's use of government aircraft, it was revealed that Mnuchin had requested a military jet for his honeymoon travel to Europe in June 2017. Mnuchin stated that, as a member of the United States National Security Council, he needed access to secure communications during his honeymoon, but withdrew his request for the military jet after an alternative was identified. Mnuchin stated: "I'm very sensitive to the use of government funds. I've never asked the government to pay for my personal travel ... The story [regarding the honeymoon travel request] was quite misreported." The OIG investigation also showed Mnuchin had taken a United States Air Force C-37A, the military designation of the Gulfstream V, to return from New York to Washington on August 15 after flying to New York commercially. Although the request for travel on the military jet was initiated by Mnuchin's office, the aircraft had previously been used to fly Transportation Secretary Elaine Chao from Joint Base Andrews to Teterboro Airport. Mnuchin's return flight lasted less than an hour and had an operating cost of at least $25,000.

The OIG released its report on October 4, 2017, concluding that there was "no violation of law in these requests and uses" of government aircraft by Mnuchin, but also expressing concern regarding "a disconnect between the standard of proof called for in the Daley memo and the actual amount of proof provided by Treasury and accepted by the White House in justifying these trip requests". The referenced Daley Memo was issued by then-White House Chief of Staff William M. Daley on April 4, 2011, and it stated the standards for use of government aircraft by senior executive branch officials were given in OMB Circular A-126, dated February 10, 1993. The Daley Memo also states that travel using military aircraft must be considered a White House Support Mission, taken at the specific direction of the President under one of a set of limited circumstances that "make commercial transportation unacceptable". The typical reimbursement paid by requesting federal executive agencies covers only the cost of an equivalent coach ticket on a commercial flight.

In the report, the OIG reviewed nine travel requests by Mnuchin for military air transportation since March 2017, of which seven were approved and taken, one was withdrawn, and one was approved with travel pending in late October 2017. The total cost of the seven trips taken was $811,800, calculated from per-hour cost and operating hours for the specific aircraft, or Air Force-provided direct costs of operations. Two of the flights, taken to Europe in March and May 2017, each cost more than $300,000. On one flight, to Ottawa in June, Mnuchin was accompanied by his then-fiancée Linton. The total cost of the Ottawa trip was $16,350, and the reimbursement repaid for Linton's cost of travel was $744. Due to an inconsistency in the records provided for the trip to New York on August 15, the OIG opened a second inquiry in October 2017, "to assure that [the OIG] have in fact received all relevant records".

==== Student heckling incident ====
Mnuchin spoke at the University of California, Los Angeles on February 26, 2018, where he was heckled and initially blocked the video from being released. The university said in a statement that Mnuchin, who at first "subsequently withdrew" his approval for the video to be posted online, later gave consent for the video to be published.

==== Effort to invoke the Twenty-fifth amendment ====
Mnuchin was one of several cabinet officials who discussed invoking the Twenty-fifth Amendment to remove Donald Trump from office following the Capitol riot on January 6, 2021, according to Politico. "I was aware of all these discussions," Mnuchin said regarding the amendment, "It would not be an unreasonable assumption to think that people were calling me, okay, and talking about it, whether they were pushing it or not pushing it."

== Personal life ==
Mnuchin's mother was a long-time investor with Bernie Madoff. After his mother died in early 2005, Mnuchin and his brother liquidated her investments, making $3.2 million. A Madoff trustee sued to retrieve the money from the Mnuchins, but a court ruled that the Madoff trust could recoup money only from those who had cashed out less than two years before the December 2008 collapse of Madoff's company.

=== Marriages and children ===
From 1992 to 1999, Mnuchin was married to Kathryn Leigh McCarver.

In 1999, Mnuchin married Heather deForest Crosby, and they had three children together. Heather Mnuchin was active in philanthropy and AZIAM yoga. After he bought IndyMac, Mnuchin moved to a 21,000-square-foot (2,000 m^{2}), $26.5 million house in Bel Air, Los Angeles, California, because the company's headquarters was in Pasadena. They divorced in 2014.

Mnuchin married actress Louise Linton on June 24, 2017. Vice President Mike Pence presided over the ceremony. A 2017 photo of Mnuchin and Linton holding up the sheet of new $1 bills, as they toured the Bureau of Engraving and Printing, drew wide mockery on the Internet and became a meme. In 2023, Linton had a daughter with Mnuchin.

=== Non-profit work ===
Mnuchin served as a member of the development board of Yale University, as a board member of the Riverdale Country School, as a member of the national board and senior member of the non-profit youth organization Junior Achievement, to which he had donated money, and as a board member of the Hirshhorn Museum and Sculpture Garden.

== See also ==
- List of people and organizations named in the Paradise Papers
- List of Jewish United States Cabinet members

Political offices
| Preceded by Jack Lew | United States Secretary of the Treasury; 2017–2021 | Succeeded by Janet Yellen |
U.S. order of precedence (ceremonial)
| Preceded by Tom Price as Former U.S. Cabinet Member | Order of precedence of the United States as Former U.S. Cabinet Member | Succeeded by David Shulkin as Former U.S. Cabinet Member |
