= Deitch =

Deitch is a surname. Notable people with the surname include:

- Adam Deitch (born 1978), American record producer and drummer
- Donna Deitch (born 1945), American film and television director, producer and writer
- Gene Deitch (1924–2020), American illustrator, animator and film director
- Jeffrey Deitch (born 1952), American art dealer and curator
- Joseph Deitch (born 1950), American business executive, philanthropist and author
- Kim Deitch (born 1944), American cartoonist
- Mark Deutch (also spelled Deitch; 1845–2012), Russian journalist and author
- Robert Deitch, American author and social activist
- Yossi Daitsh (also spelled Deitch; born 1968), Israeli politician

== See also ==
- Deitch Projects
