= 110 Tower (disambiguation) =

110 Tower may refer to:

- 110 Tower, formerly known as AutoNation Tower, an office building in Fort Lauderdale, Florida, United States.
- 110 Plaza, also known as the Commonwealth Building or the 110 Tower Building, an office building in San Diego.
- Salesforce Tower, 110 Bishopsgate, formerly known as Heron Tower, a commercial skyscraper in London.

== See also ==
- 101 Tower (disambiguation)
