= 101 Tower (disambiguation) =

101 Tower may refer to:

- Taipei 101, a skyscraper in Taiwan, one of the world's tallest buildings
- 101 Tower (Kyiv), a skyscraper in Kyiv, Ukraine
- Horizons 101, a two-tower condominium complex in Cebu City, Philippines

== See also ==
- 110 Tower (disambiguation)
