= OneWest Bank =

American regional bank of Southern California

OneWest Bank, N.A.
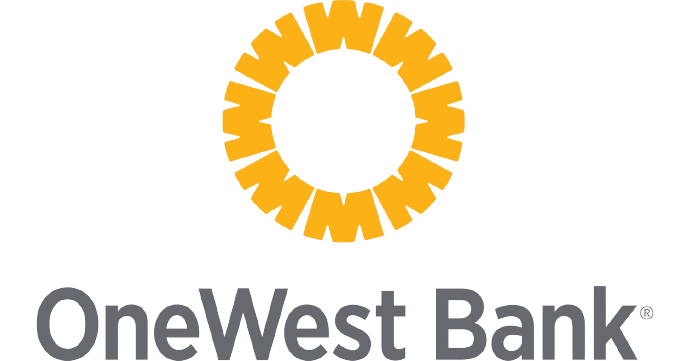
- Type: Subsidiary
- Industry: Banking
- Founded: March 19, 2009; 17 years ago
- Founders: Steven Mnuchin (via IMB Holdco)
- Defunct: July 15, 2022; 4 years ago
- Headquarters: Pasadena, California, U.S.
- Area served: Southern California
- Parent: First Citizens BancShares
- Website: www.firstcitizens.com

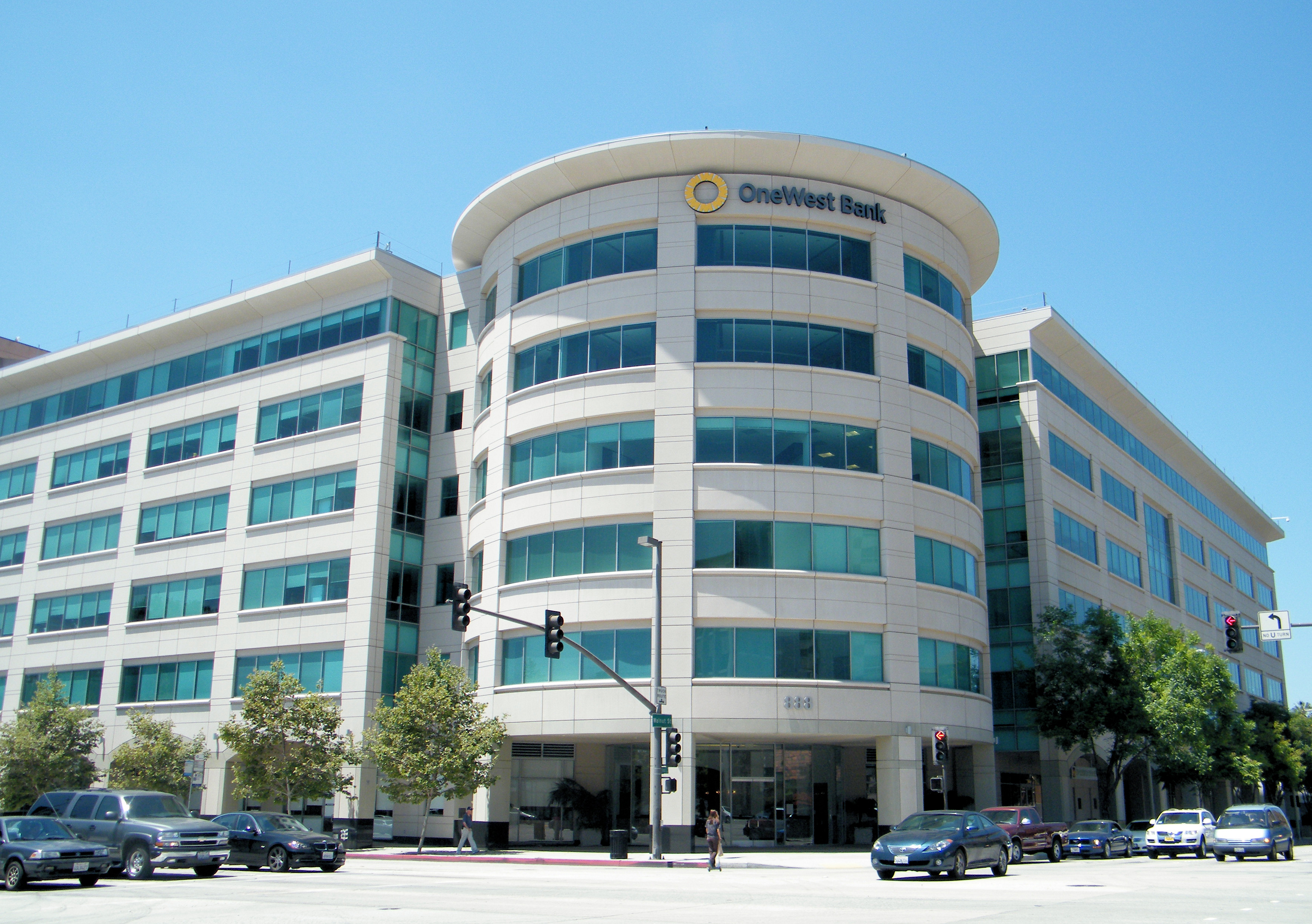
Former OneWest headquarters in Pasadena (2009–2016)

OneWest Bank is a former US regional bank that operated from March 2009 to July 2022, when it became a division of First Citizens BancShares. With over 60 retail branches in Southern California. OneWest Bank specialized in consumer deposit and lending. OneWest also offered small business services, loans, and treasury management products.

== History ==
From 2008 to 2012, 465 banks failed in the United States after the 2008 financial crisis. When the Federal Deposit Insurance Corporation (FDIC) closed the banks, their assets were sold. On March 19, 2009, a seven-member investor group, IMB Holdco, led by Steven Mnuchin—which included billionaires Christopher Flowers, John Paulson, Michael Dell, and George Soros—purchased Independent National Mortgage Corporation (IndyMac Bank) of Pasadena, California for $13.65 billion from the FDIC and created OneWest, which then had 33 branches and $32 billion in assets. IndyMac Bank's failure was the fourth largest in US history.

Through OneWest Bank the investment group purchased two other failed banks from the FDIC, the First Federal Bank of California on December 18, 2009, which then had $6 billion in assets and $5 billion in deposits, and La Jolla Bank, FSB in February 2010, which then represented $3.6 billion in assets. In November 2010, OneWest purchased a $1.4 billion multifamily and commercial real estate loan portfolio from Citibank, which included approximately 600 loans, as part of their commercial real estate lending business. Under a Freedom of Information Act (FOIA) request, nonprofit California Reinvestment Coalition determined that as of December 2014, the FDIC had already paid over $1 billion to OneWest Bank under the shared loss agreements it secured from the FDIC when it purchased IndyMac and La Jolla Banks, and that the FDIC expected it would pay another $1.4 billion.

The New York Daily News and the Wall Street Journal reported that OneWest Bank had started foreclosure proceedings on 137,000 homeowners.

On November 25, 2009, Judge Jeffrey Spinner in Long Island, New York, penalized OneWest for their “harsh, repugnant, shocking and repulsive” actions in trying to work out a distressed mortgage, by canceling the debt in favor of the borrower. A year later, an appellate court overruled that the decision.

On December 8, 2009, OneWest worked with the Hennepin County, Minnesota Sheriff's department to change the locks on a distressed home despite stating in a Nov. 25 e-mail that they were rescinding both the foreclosure and the sheriff's sale. Changing the locks was done without a court action, bypassing mandated due process on home foreclosures in Minnesota.

OneWest Bank stopped originating reverse mortgages before CIT acquired the bank. However, it continued servicing its portfolio of reverse mortgages, and was criticized for abusive foreclosure practices. In May 2017, CIT agreed to pay $89 million in settlement claims related to OneWest's reverse mortgage program. According to the United States Department of Justice, "The United States alleged that Financial Freedom sought to obtain insurance payments for interest from FHA despite failing to disclose on the insurance claim properly forms it filed with the agency that the mortgagee was not eligible for such interest payments because it had failed to meet various deadlines relating to appraisal of the property, submission of claims to HUD, and pursuit of foreclosure proceedings. As a result, from March 31, 2011 to August 31, 2016, the mortgagees on the relevant reverse mortgage loans serviced by Financial Freedom allegedly obtained additional interest they were not entitled to receive."

In July 2014, OneWest Bank and CIT Group announced a merger. CIT Group had accepted $2.3 billion in Troubled Asset Relief Program funding that it never repaid, because it declared bankruptcy. Nonprofits raised concerns about the merger, citing the damage caused by OneWest's approximately 36,000 foreclosures in California, the bank's weak record in small business lending, weak Community Reinvestment Act record, and concerns about possible redlining. On February 2, 2015, Daily Kos and the California Reinvestment Coalition delivered more than 15,000 signatures on petitions opposing the merger.

On August 3, 2015, CIT Group acquired OneWest Bank, N.A. In January 2022, CIT was acquired by First Citizens BancShares.
