= Commonwealth Financial Network =

American investment advisor firm

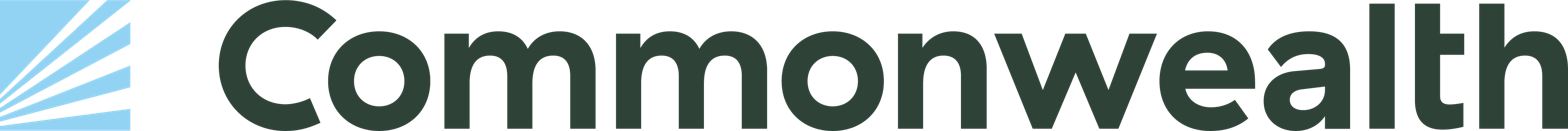
- Type: Private
- Industry: Financial services
- Founded: 1979; 47 years ago
- Headquarters: 275 Wyman St., Waltham, Massachusetts, United States
- Key people: Joseph Deitch (Chairman); Wayne Bloom (CEO)
- Revenue: ▲US$1.233 billion (2017)
- AUM: Approximately $156 billion
- Number of employees: Approximately 854
- Website: www.commonwealth.com

Commonwealth Financial Network is a privately held Registered Investment Adviser–independent broker/dealer in Waltham, Massachusetts, and 110 Plaza in San Diego, California, and a new office to be opened in 2024 in Cincinnati, Ohio. The company was founded in 1979 by Joseph S. Deitch and was incorporated under the name Commonwealth Equity Services. In 1999, the name Commonwealth Financial Network was adopted. As of 2017, Deitch remains Chairman of the firm. The firm is owned and controlled by its 13 managing principals.

Commonwealth has approximately 1,950 independent financial advisers and financial planners for whom it serves as a "back office", processing investment transactions on behalf of their clients, and to whom the firm provides resources and consulting services to support the advisors' businesses.

Advisors who affiliate with the firm must earn a minimum of $200,000 in annual gross broker/dealer concessions (GDC). Gross revenue per advisor in 2017 was the highest among independent broker/dealers, as reported by Financial Advisor in April 2017.

== History ==
Year	Event
1979	Firm incorporated as Commonwealth Equity Services.
1985–1987	Commonwealth was named one of Inc. magazine's 500 fastest-growing private companies in the U.S. for three consecutive years.
1991–2005	Investment Advisor magazine named Commonwealth Broker/Dealer of the Year a total of ten times.
1992	Commonwealth acquired Kavanaugh Securities of Dallas, Texas, to expand its national presence.
1999	Changed name to Commonwealth Financial Network.
2000	Commonwealth opened its San Diego office.
2009	Wayne Bloom, a 20-year Commonwealth veteran and managing principal since 1999, succeeds Joseph Deitch as CEO. Mr. Deitch remains chairman of the firm.
2013	Rich Hunter, a 25-year Commonwealth veteran and managing principal since 1996, is appointed president and COO. Peter Wheeler assumes the title of Vice Chairman.
2016	Commonwealth ranks highest in advisor satisfaction on Wealth Management magazine's 2016 Independent Broker/Dealer Report Card.
2017	Commonwealth is honored with the Invest in Others Corporate Philanthropy Award – Financial Institutions for the firm's grassroots initiative, Chemo Caps for Kids.
2018	Kol Chu Birke, Trap Kloman, and Brad McMillan are welcomed as managing partners, spreading Commonwealth's ownership among 13 dedicated, tenured, industry experts and strengthening the firm's management ranks for years to come.
2018	Commonwealth announces Trap Kloman will assume the dual role of president and chief operating officer at year-end. Rich Hunter will remain one of 13 managing partners.
2018	For the fifth straight time, J.D. Power ranks Commonwealth "Highest in Independent Advisor Satisfaction Among Financial Investment Firms."
2018	To date, Commonwealth has been recognized a remarkable 41 times as one of the Best Places to Work by five top publications.
