= 110 Plaza =

Coordinates: 32.7193040°N 117.16439902°W

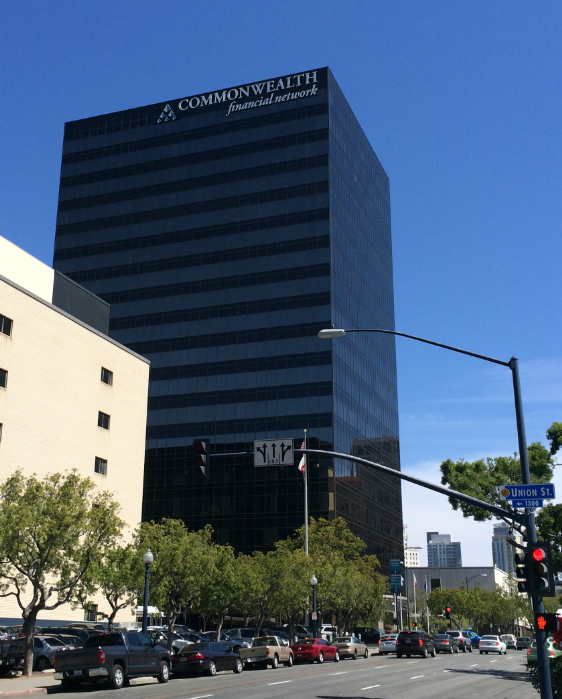
- 110 Plaza Building looking east on A street

General information
- Status: Completed
- Type: Office
- Location: 110 West A Street, San Diego, California, United States
- Construction started: 1970
- Completed: 1971

Height
- Roof: 266 ft (81 m)

Technical details
- Floor count: 18

110 Plaza, also known as the Commonwealth Building or the 110 Tower Building, is a 266 feet (81 m) modernist office building in downtown San Diego, Civic / Core Neighborhood. The address of the building is 110 West A Street, San Diego, CA 92101 and it is bordered by Front Street, A Street, 1st Avenue, and Ash Street.

When the building opened in 1971, it was the first all-glass high rise in San Diego. The 18-story building has a bronze plate-glass exterior and can be identified by the Commonwealth Financial Network sign located on the top of the north and west-facing sides.

== History ==
110 Plaza opened on September 14, 1971. Construction was completed in less than a year at a cost of $14 million. Built originally by the Bank of California, the building gained fame as a landmark consisting of 142,000 square feet of bronze plate glass. News articles of the day suggested the all-glass building might be an inviting target for “social dissidents”, but the concern was unfounded. One of the outstanding features of the building, and still remarkable today, is the 32 tons of granite in the building header. After being quarried in Quebec, Canada, the granite was shipped to Querceto, Italy where it was cut and polished. A longshoreman’s strike stranded the granite in Central America, and it had to be flown to Los Angeles and trucked to San Diego in order to complete the building.

The building was topped by an “executive dining room”, featuring cuisine by the former executive chef of the Westgate Hotel. The average number of lunch patrons, consisting of bank executives and their guests, was 18. Menu selections included such delicacies as “Green Turtle Soup Au Sherry” ($1.00) and “Frog Legs Sauté Provençale” ($3.25).

The building introduced the world's first fully automatic banking machine. Located outside the building entrance, this predecessor of today's ATM performed innovative functions such as cash deposits and withdrawals, bank payments and transfers between accounts. Customer accessed the machine using their Master Charge card and a personal code.

== Tenants ==
- Voice of San Diego
- Commonwealth Financial Network
- State of California Attorney General's Office
- Sempra Energy
- Parsons Infrastructure & Technology

== See also ==
- List of tallest buildings in San Diego
