= Gross dealer concession =

Revenue to brokerage firm when product is sold

Gross Dealer Concession or GDC is the revenue to a brokerage firm when commissioned securities and insurance salespeople sell a product, whether it is an investment like company shares, bonds, or mutual funds, or insurance like life insurance or long term care insurance. The commission that the agent receives is usually a percentage of this figure, although some firms like Merrill Lynch use figures called Production Credits, usually smaller than GDC, to determine payouts and retain more revenue.

For example, a mutual fund with a 5.75% sales charge is sold to someone who invests $10,000. $575 GDC is created by the sale, and the investor has an initial account balance of $9425. If the sales agent receives 32% of the GDC, he makes $184. If the payout is based on Production Credits or PCs, it would perhaps be about 5.5% of the total sale, or 32% of 550: $176.
