= First Federal Bank of California =

- Type: Public
- Industry: Banking
- Founded: 1929
- Defunct: 2009
- Successor: OneWest Bank
- Headquarters: Los Angeles, California
- Key people: Babette Heimbuch, CEO
- Revenue: $439 million
- Number of employees: 600

The First Federal Bank of California was a community bank founded in 1929, and encompassed most of Southern California. As of 2009, it operated approximately thirty-nine branches.

First Federal Bank, which offered both personal and business financial services, was a wholly owned subsidiary of First Fed Financial Corp. The banks financial goals were to retain superior quality, staying at the forefront of technology and focusing on organic growth and profitability.

On December 18, 2009, the Office of Thrift Supervision closed the Santa Monica-based bank and named the Federal Deposit Insurance Corporation (FDIC) as receiver. All deposit accounts were transferred to OneWest Bank of Pasadena. All 39 of its branches reopened as branches of OneWest.

== History ==
First Federal Bank of California was founded in 1929 by William S. Mortensen, and later became an institution called First Federal Savings and Loan Association of Santa Monica.

In 1983, they diversified to offer full-service personal and business banking, including but notwithstanding wealth management and trust services. In 1987, they listed on the New York Stock Exchange as (symbol: FED). Subsequently, in 1989, they changed their name from First Federal Savings Bank to First Federal Bank of California to reflect the California marketplace.

On December 18, 2009, First Federal Bank of California was closed by the Office of Thrift Supervision. The assets and deposits of Federal Bank of California in Santa Monica were bought by closely held OneWest Bank. As of December 2010, the FDIC estimates the failure of First Federal Bank of California will cost the deposit insurance fund $10.0 million.

In January 2010, the company filed for Chapter 11 bankruptcy protection.
