= Joseph Deitch =

American business executive and philanthropist

Joseph S. Deitch (born June 9, 1950) is an American business executive and philanthropist, and the author of Elevate: An Essential Guide to Life. In 2018, he founded the Elevate Prize Foundation. The organization awards $10 million annually in cash and services to its recipients as well as providing resources in marketing, media, and planning to scale their enterprises. He is the founder and Chairman of Commonwealth Financial Network, the largest privately owned independent RIA-broker/dealer in the United States with over $350 billion of assets under management. In addition, Deitch is the chairman of Southworth Development, a golf and leisure real estate company. He has also served as a Broadway producer and won a Tony Award as co-producer of The Gershwin’s Porgy and Bess in 2012. Deitch also founded the Deitch Leadership Institute at the Boston Latin School, the oldest public school in the United States (1635).

== Life and career ==
Deitch was born and raised in Boston, Massachusetts. He lived in Dorchester and Mattapan, graduating in 1968 from the Boston Latin School, and then attended the University of Pennsylvania, where he received a BA in International Relations in 1972. He later attended Harvard Business School, graduating from the Owner/President Management program in 1989.

Following graduation from the University of Pennsylvania, he moved to the U.S. Virgin Islands for two years, before moving back to Boston. He began his professional career in 1974 with Mass Indemnity. He then moved to New England Life in 1975, to pursue a career in financial planning, and in 1978, he founded The Cambridge Group which provided comprehensive financial planning services to affluent individuals. In 1982, Becker Research Corporation named The Cambridge Group the most prominent financial planning firm in its area.

In 1979, he formed Commonwealth Equity Services, an independent Broker-dealer. Today, the company is known as Commonwealth Financial Network. In 1988, Deitch left The Cambridge Group in order to focus exclusively on Commonwealth.

In 2006, he formed a partnership with Southworth Development CEO David Southworth, becoming chairman of Southworth Development, a golf and leisure real estate company with properties in the United States, Scotland, and The Bahamas. Each of the company's six properties have received national and/or international acclaim. In 2020, Deitch acquired David Southworth's interest and the Deitch family now owns all of the Southworth Development Enterprise.

Deitch served as CEO of Commonwealth Financial Network until 2009, when he assumed the role of Chairman. Today, Commonwealth serves over 2,500 investment advisors, with over $350 billion in assets under management as of 2025. J.D. Power and Associates has ranked Commonwealth “Highest in Independent Advisor Satisfaction Among Financial Investment Firms,” 11 times in a row.

From 2009 – 2012, Deitch co-produced 9 Broadway productions, most of which were produced through Full House Productions, with Deitch serving as principal. These shows include The Addams Family, A View from the Bridge, and Fela, many of which were nominated for, or won, several Tony awards. In 2012, Deitch won a Tony award as co-producer for The Gershwin’s Porgy and Bess.

== Impact ==
In 2004, 2005, and 2006, Deitch was recognized by Investment Advisor magazine as one of the Top 25 most influential people in the financial planning industry. In 2010, the magazine named him one of the “30 most influential individuals in and around the planning profession,” In 2015, Deitch was named to Investment Advisor magazine as one of the Top 35 most influential people in the financial planning industry. Through Southworth Development, he developed the first 18-hole Geo-Certified Course in the UK, ranked #1 as the Top Eco Course whilst also reaching #21 in the Top 100 Golf Resorts in Great Britain & Ireland according to Golf World: 2021. The company's Ugadale Hotel was named Resort Hotel of the Year at the Scottish Hospitality Awards.

== Community activities ==
In 2011, Deitch helped to form Commonwealth Cares, a 501(c)(3) charity designed to maximize the impact of Commonwealth Financial Network's charitable efforts.

Also in 2011, he founded the Deitch Leadership Institute at the Boston Latin School. The institute provides leadership training and focuses on individual growth and community improvement.

Mr. Deitch also serves on the board of Sanku - Project Healthy Children, a social enterprise working to alleviate malnutrition in East Africa. As of March 2022, Sanku works with close to 700 mills to give 10 million people access to the basic human right of nutritious food.

The Elevate Prize Foundation, which Deitch founded in 2018, awards $10 million annually to recipients “whose ideas and endeavors elevate the human experience”.

== Personal life ==
Deitch married psychologist Robbie Sue Lacritz, PsyD, in 1982. They were married until her death of ovarian cancer in December, 2006. He has one son, born in 1986.
